= Suzuki Ertiga =

Mini MPV

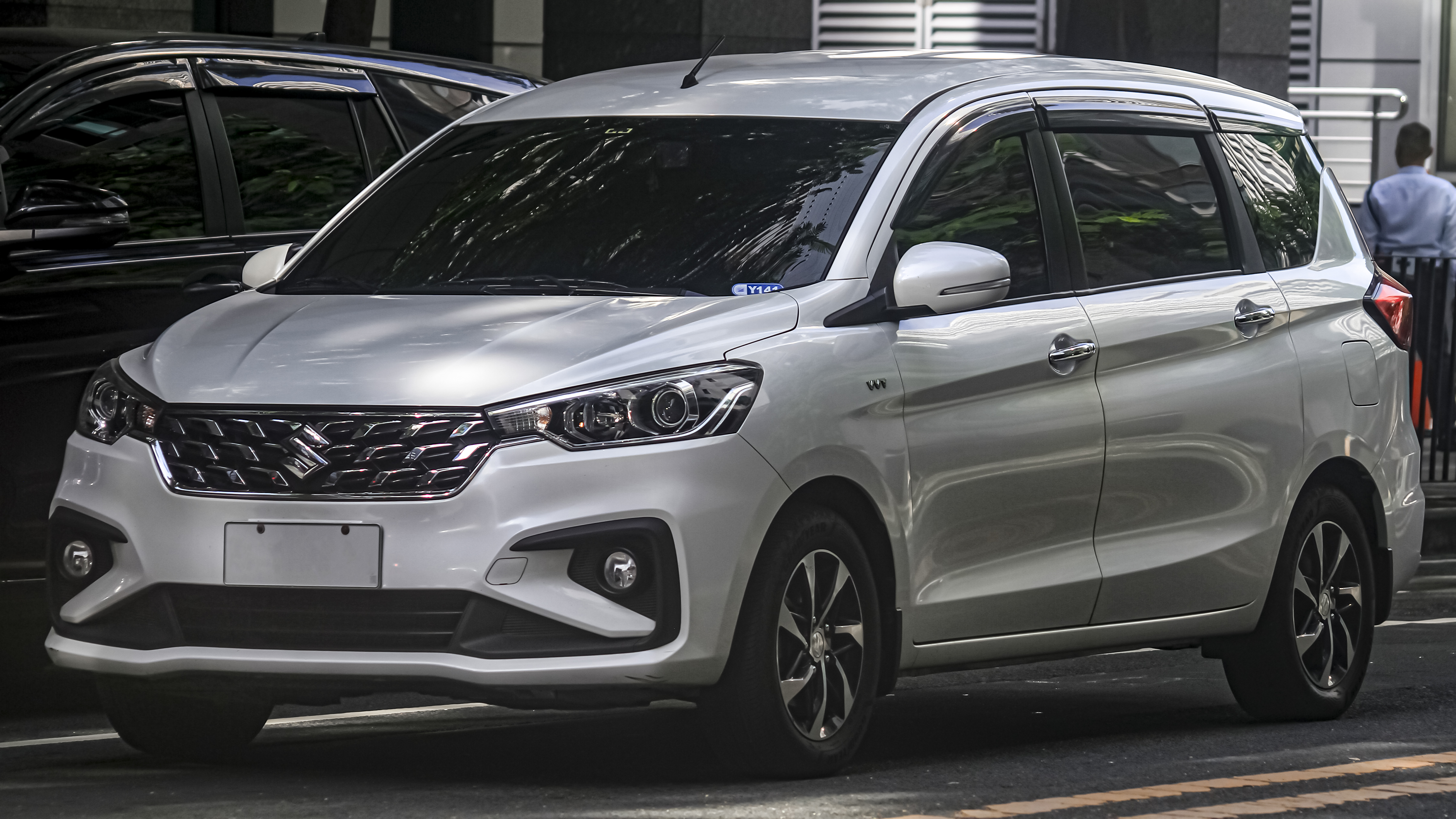
- Suzuki Ertiga GLX (Philippines)

Overview
- Manufacturer: Suzuki
- Production: January 2012 – present

Body and chassis
- Class: Mini MPV (2012–2018); Compact MPV (2018–present)
- Body style: 5-door wagon
- Layout: Front-engine, front-wheel-drive

The Suzuki Ertiga is a series of multi-purpose vehicles (MPV) manufactured by the Japanese carmaker Suzuki since 2012, designed primarily for emerging markets. The first generation was heavily based on the second-generation Swift while the second generation introduced in 2018 is made larger and based on the HEARTECT platform. A crossover-styled version was introduced in 2019 as a separate model called the Suzuki XL6 in India and Suzuki XL7 for worldwide markets. The largest markets for the Ertiga are India and Indonesia, where the model is mainly manufactured. The vehicle has also been exported to other South Asian and Southeast Asian markets, along with several markets in Africa, Middle East, Pacific Islands, Caribbean and Latin America.

The Ertiga has been rebadged by various carmakers throughout its history. The first-generation model was sold in Indonesia through Mazda dealership network by an OEM agreement as the Mazda VX-1 from 2013 until 2017, and was assembled and sold in Malaysia by Proton as the Proton Ertiga from 2016 until 2019. The second-generation model is also sold by Toyota as the Toyota Rumion since 2021.

The name "Ertiga" is coined from "R-tiga", a pronunciation of "R3" in Indonesian where "tiga" means "three" while "R" stands for "row", referencing its three-row seating capacity.

== First generation (ZE; 2012) ==
First generation
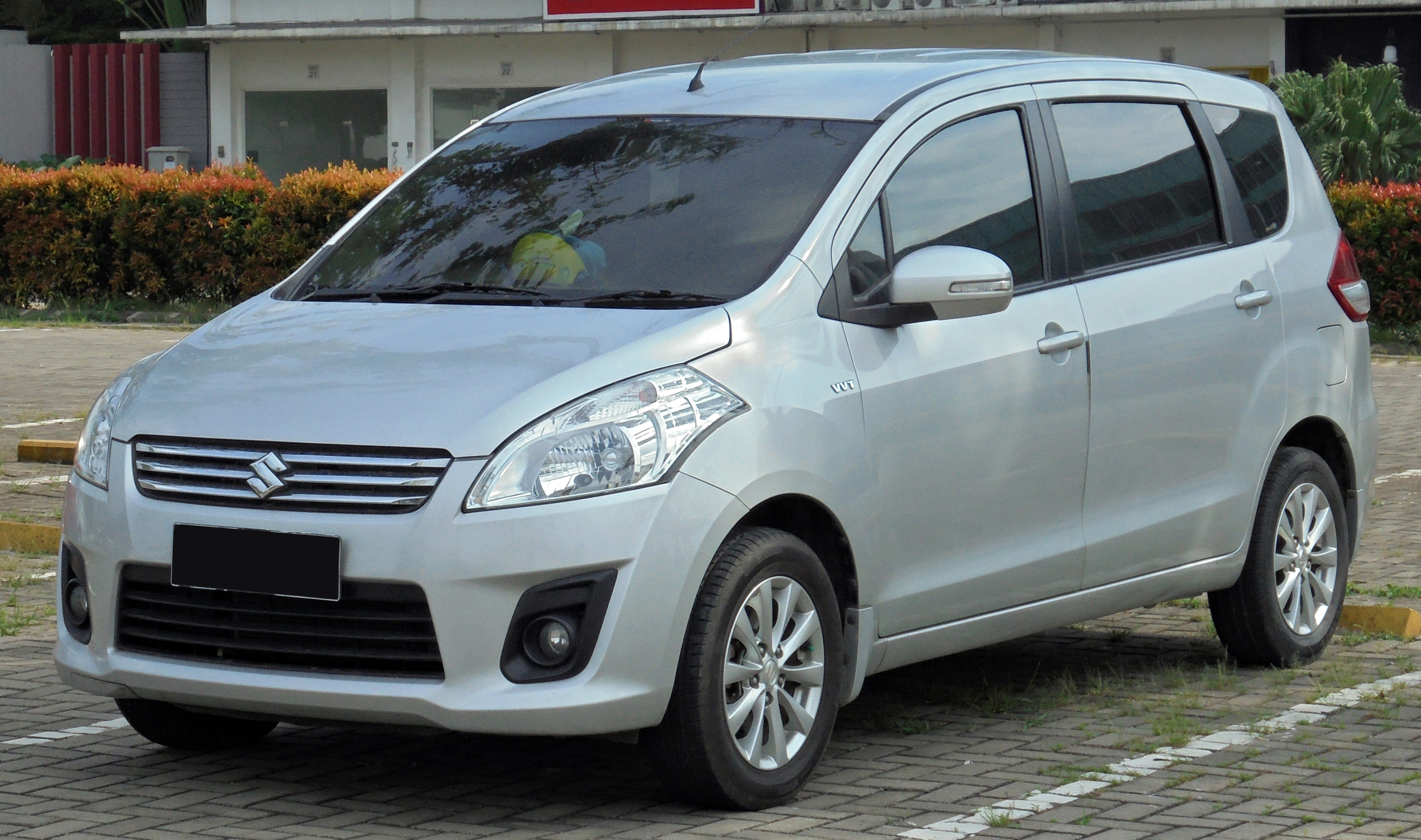
- 2012 Ertiga GX (pre-facelift, Indonesia)

Overview
- Model code: ZE
- Also called: Mazda VX-1 (Indonesia, 2013–2017); Proton Ertiga (Malaysia, 2016–2019)
- Production: January 2012 – September 2018 (Suzuki); November 2016 – August 2019 (Proton)
- Assembly: India: Gurgaon (Maruti Suzuki); Indonesia: Bekasi Regency (Suzuki Indomobil Motor Tambun plant, 2012–2015; Cikarang plant, 2015–2018); Malaysia: Proton City (PTMSB); Myanmar: Thilawa (Suzuki Myanmar)
- Designer: Hisanori Matsushima

Body and chassis
- Related: Suzuki Swift (second generation); Suzuki Dzire (second generation)

Powertrain
- Engine: Petrol: 1373 cc K14B I4; Diesel: 1248 cc D13A turbo-diesel I4 MHEV
- Power output: 70 kW (94 hp; 95 PS) (petrol); 68 kW (91 hp; 92 PS) (diesel)
- Transmission: 5-speed manual; 4-speed automatic

Dimensions
- Wheelbase: 2,740 mm (107.9 in)
- Length: 4,265 mm (167.9 in)
- Width: 1,695 mm (66.7 in)
- Height: 1,685 mm (66.3 in)
- Curb weight: 1,155–1,190 kg (2,546–2,624 lb)

The Ertiga was previewed by the R-III (R3) concept car showcased by Maruti Suzuki at the 2010 Auto Expo. The production version of the car was unveiled at the 11th Auto Expo in New Delhi on 6 January 2012. It was launched in India on 12 April 2012, and in Indonesia on 22 April 2012. It became available in South Africa on 9 June 2014 and in the Philippines on 17 July 2014. Its development was led by chief engineer Toshikatsu Hibi. Maruti Suzuki proclaims it to be the first LUV (Life Utility Vehicle).

The first generation Ertiga is built on the Swift subcompact car platform. It was rebadged in Indonesia as the Mazda VX-1 from May 2013 until March 2017, and also assembled and sold in Malaysia as the Proton Ertiga, from November 2016 until August 2019. In its lifespan, the VX-1 only sold 1,640 units.

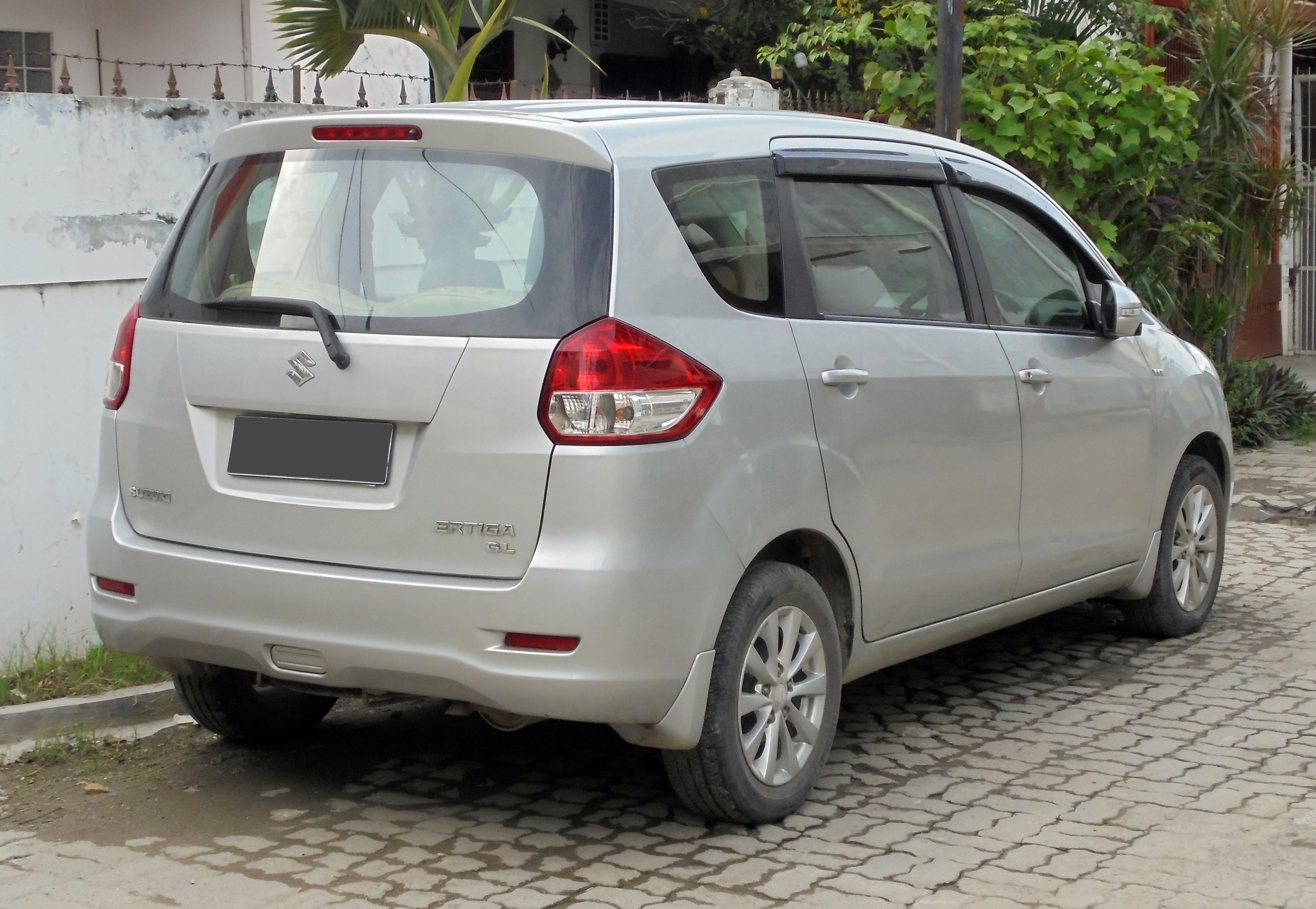
Rear view

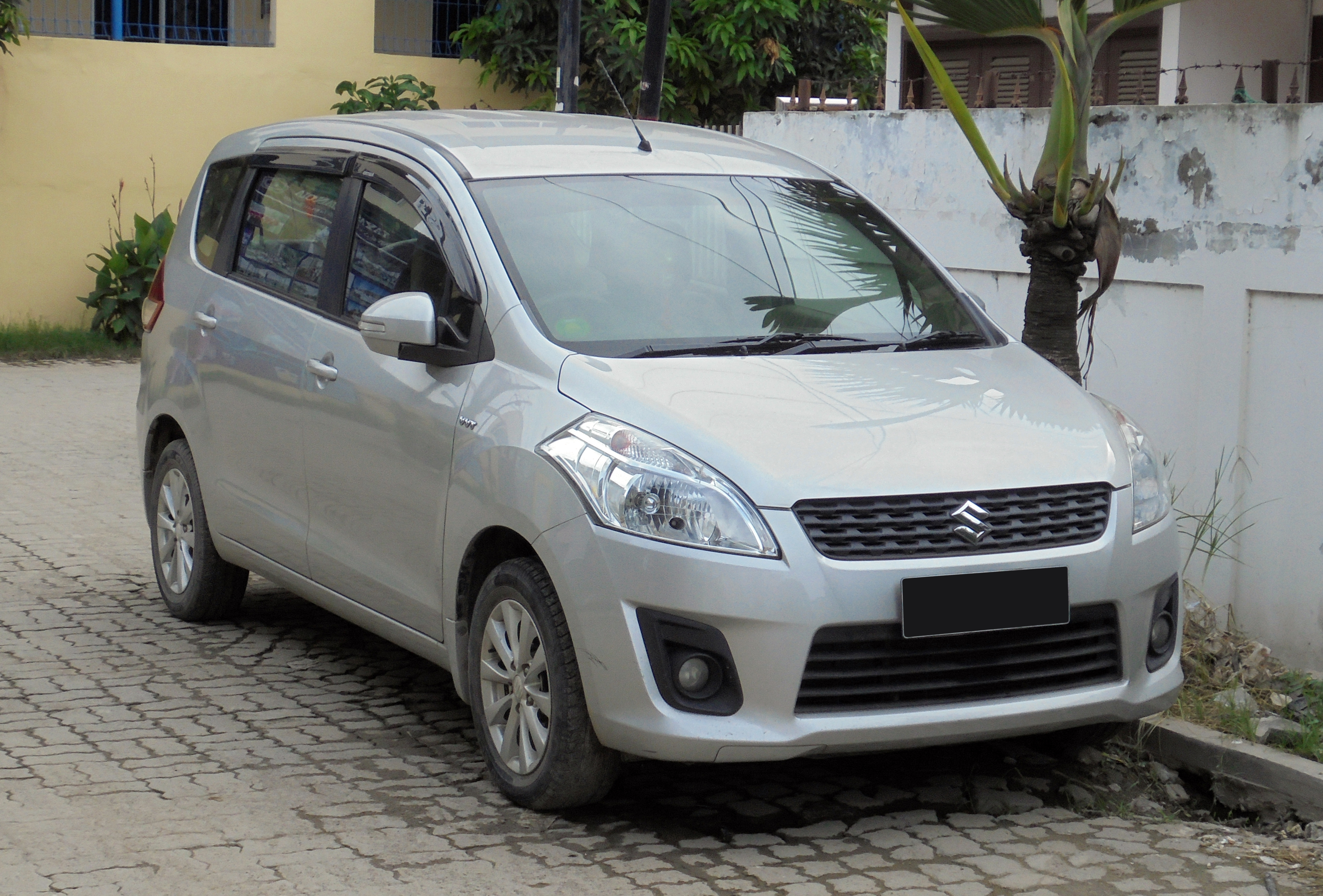
2014 Ertiga GL (pre-facelift, Indonesia)

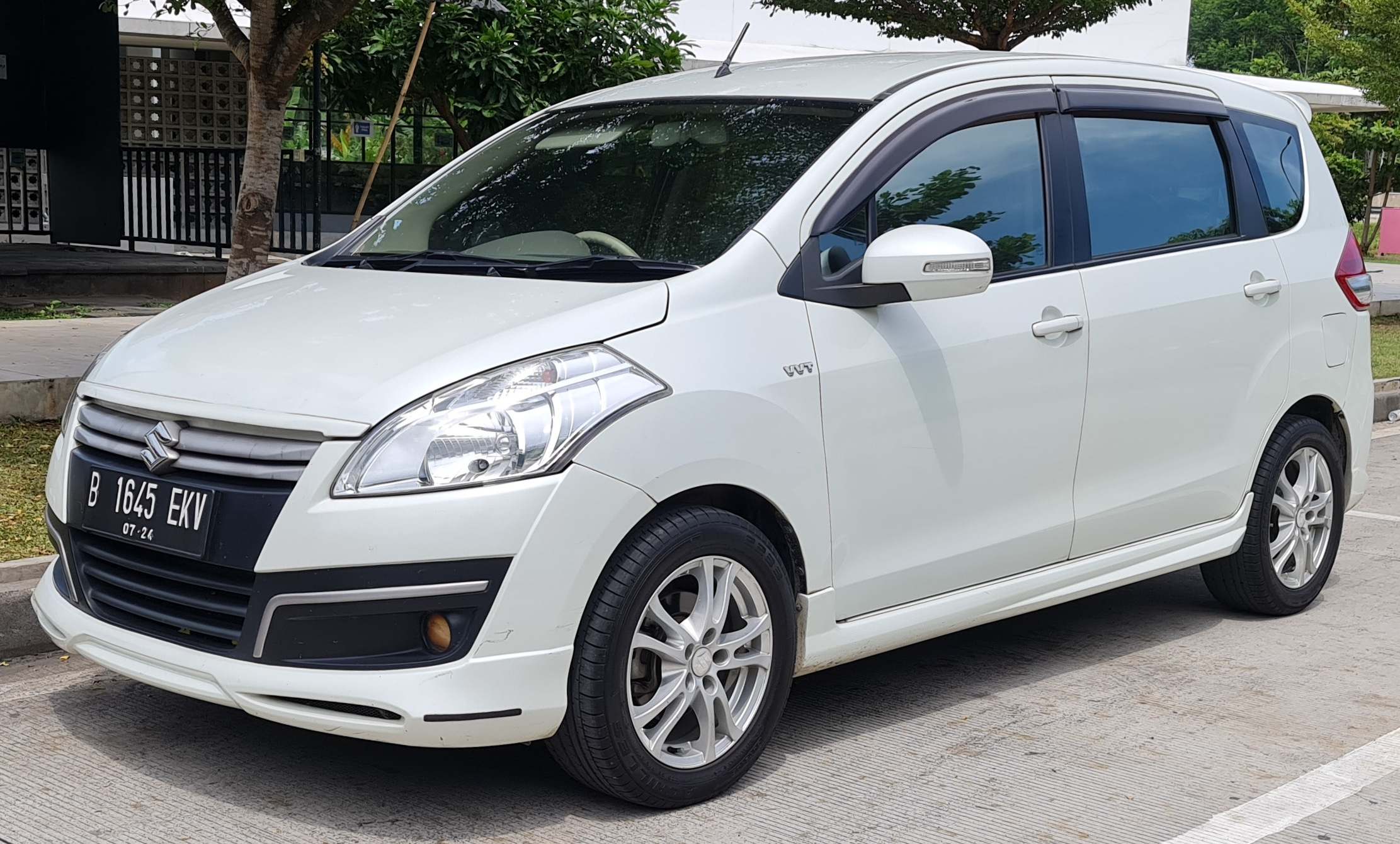
2014 Ertiga GL Sporty (pre-facelift, Indonesia)

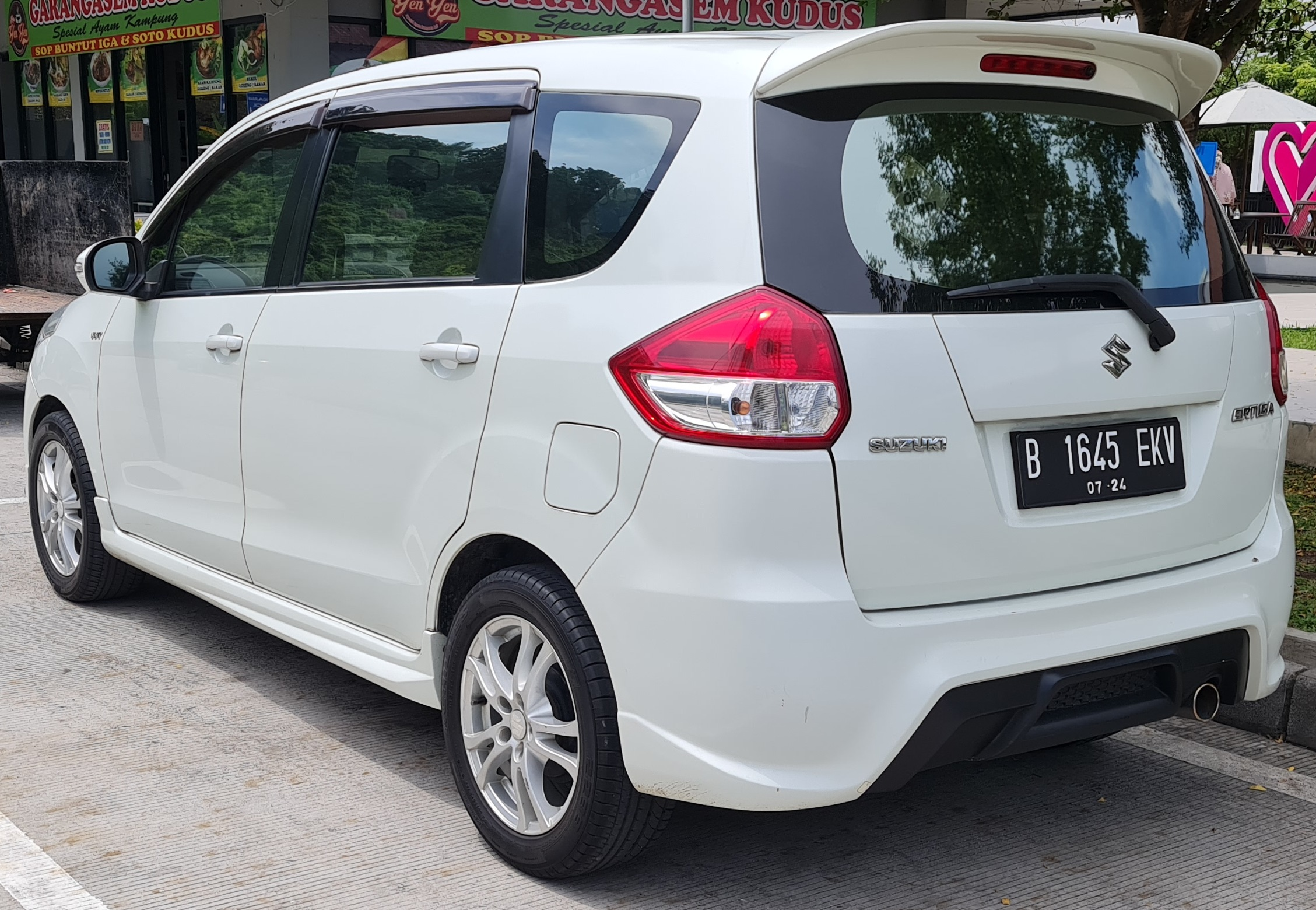
2014 Ertiga GL Sporty (pre-facelift, Indonesia)

=== Markets ===
==== India ====
According to Maruti Suzuki, the Indian Ertiga was designed specifically for Indian consumers, unlike the other Maruti models which were designed for the global market. Maruti has marketed it as a "Life Utility Vehicle". 11,000 of these vehicles were ordered in India within five days.

In India, the Ertiga is available in both the alternatives of diesel and petrol variants. Though both of these engines were also seen doing duties earlier in various models, they are tweaked and retuned specifically for the car to provide fitting performance figures for its customers. The diesel variant is available in VDi, ZDi and ZDi+ 1.5 trim levels, while the petrol variant is available in LXi, VXi ZXi and ZXi+ trim levels.

In June 2013, Maruti Suzuki added its Ertiga models with compressed natural gas (CNG). The Ertiga LXi and VXi have original factory converter kit and are provided with i-GPI (intelligent Gas Port Injection) which Maruti Suzuki claimed will achieve 22.8 km/L (64 mpg_{‑imp}; 54 mpg_{‑US}) premium-equivalent.

==== Indonesia ====
The Indonesian market Ertiga is available in GA, GL and GX trim levels. Earlier models are only available with 5-speed manual transmission. On 29 January 2013, the GL and GX trim levels received chrome front grille and double blower air conditioner. The 4-speed automatic transmission is available for GL and GX trim levels from 17 May 2013.

At the 20th Indonesia International Motor Show in September 2012, three new concepts in the Ertiga's form are introduced, the Sporty, Luxury and Crossover version, which are actually Ertigas heavily modified into concept cars. The normal version, in this case the GX trim, also appeared. The Elegant version of the GX trim is available from August 2013. The Sporty was launched on 19 February 2014, which is based on the GL trim with a different front fascia and sporty body kit.

The Ertiga sold 109,461 units in two years, with selling record over Toyota Avanza in one year.

==== Philippines ====
In the Philippines, the Ertiga is offered in three trim levels: GA (with manual transmission only), GL (with either manual or automatic transmission) and GLX (with automatic transmission only).

==== South Africa ====
The Ertiga is the brand's first MPV-type vehicle in South Africa. However the company claims the Ertiga as a Life Utility Vehicle and also claims it is aimed at being practical, while retaining the fun-to-drive characteristics on the popular Swift.

The Ertiga is the second made-in-India product in Suzuki South Africa's portfolio, the first one being the older Alto (A-Star). The South African market Ertiga is only available with a 1.4-litre petrol engine paired with either 5-speed manual or 4-speed automatic transmission.

=== Facelift ===
On 20 August 2015, the facelifted Ertiga was launched at the 23rd Gaikindo Indonesia International Auto Show. Changes consist of a wider grille, redesigned bumpers for all trim levels and a new trunk garnish exclusive to the GL and GX trim levels. The facelifted Ertiga was launched in India on 16 October 2015. Along with the diesel variants of the facelifted Ertiga comes with mild hybrid technology by Suzuki called as SHVS or Smart Hybrid Vehicle by Suzuki.

A short-lived trim was added, called the ZDi. It was launched in February 2017. Powered with a D13A diesel hybrid engine. There is no difference with the petrol-engined Ertiga, except for the ZDi and DDiS emblems. It was imported from India and only manual transmission option is available.

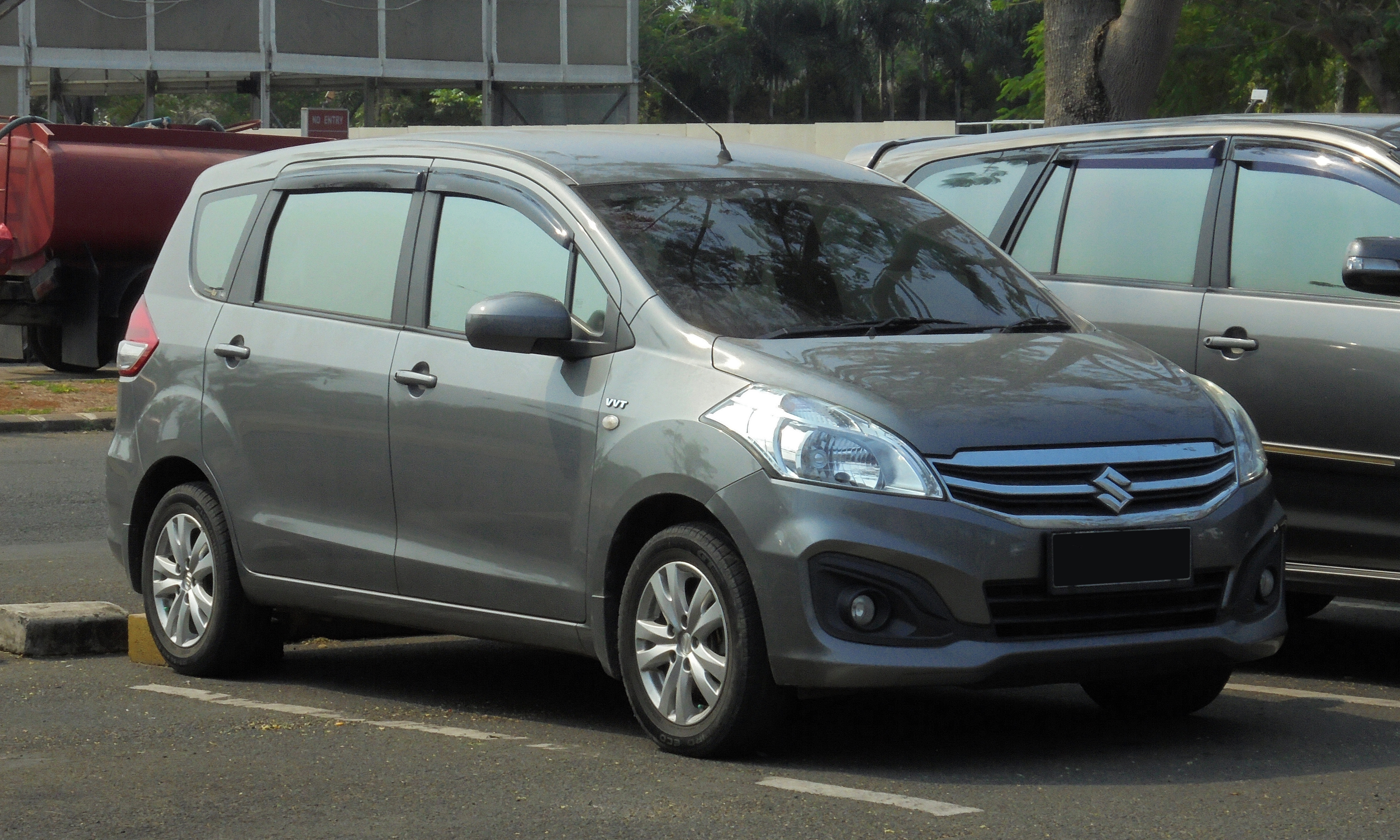
2016 Ertiga GL (facelift, Indonesia)

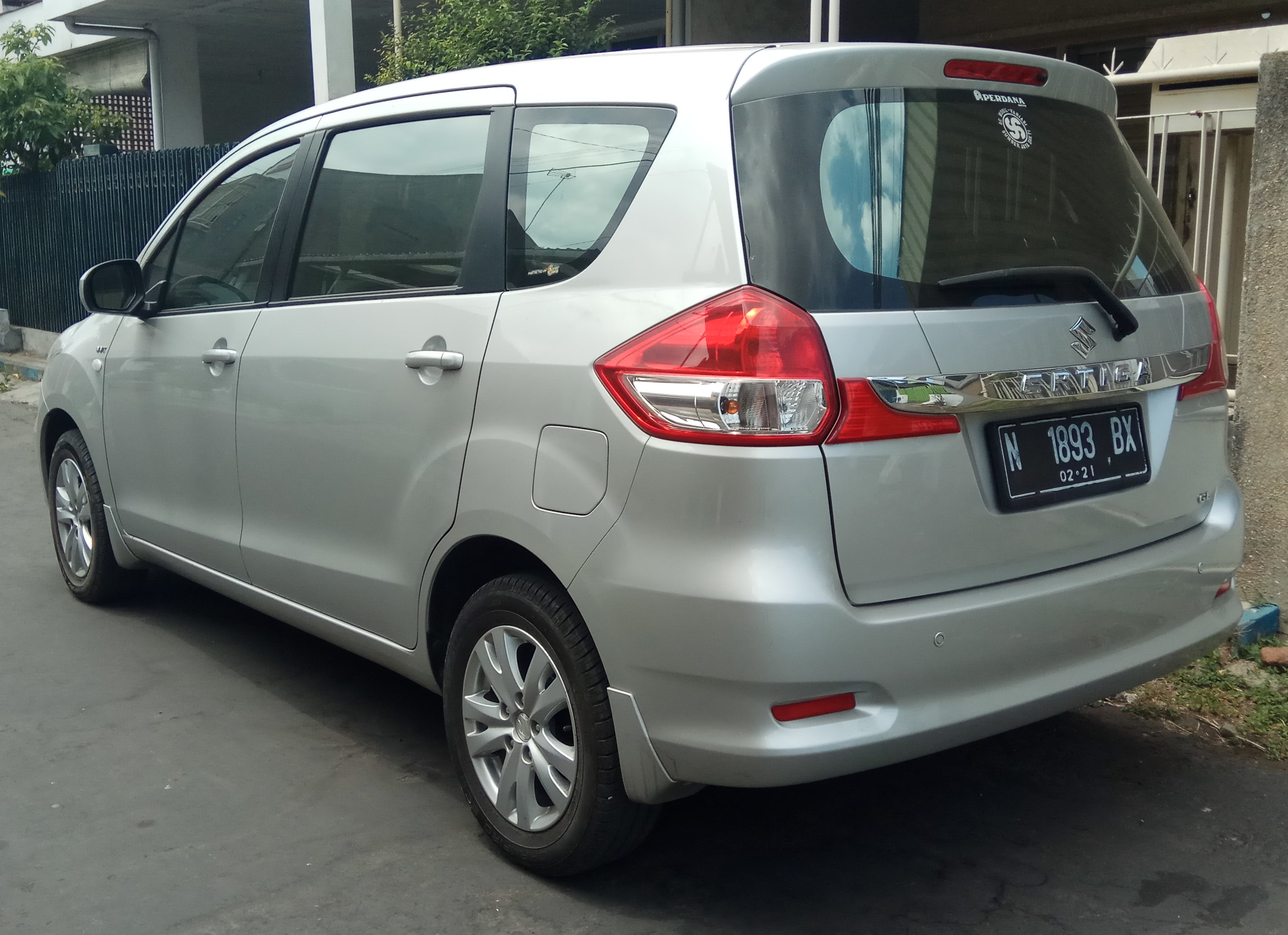
2016 Ertiga GL (facelift, Indonesia)

==== Ertiga Dreza ====
On 8 January 2016, Suzuki launched the flagship variant of the Ertiga, called Dreza. It gets a different front fascia from regular variants, different wheel design and specific colour option. The interior gets a different seat upholstery, wooden panel on the dashboard and a 9-inch Android touchscreen head unit, in High Definition (HD) 1280 x 720 pixels resolution which no other competitors offer at that time (touchscreen enabled head unit display panel usually only has 1024 x 600 pixels resolution or less).

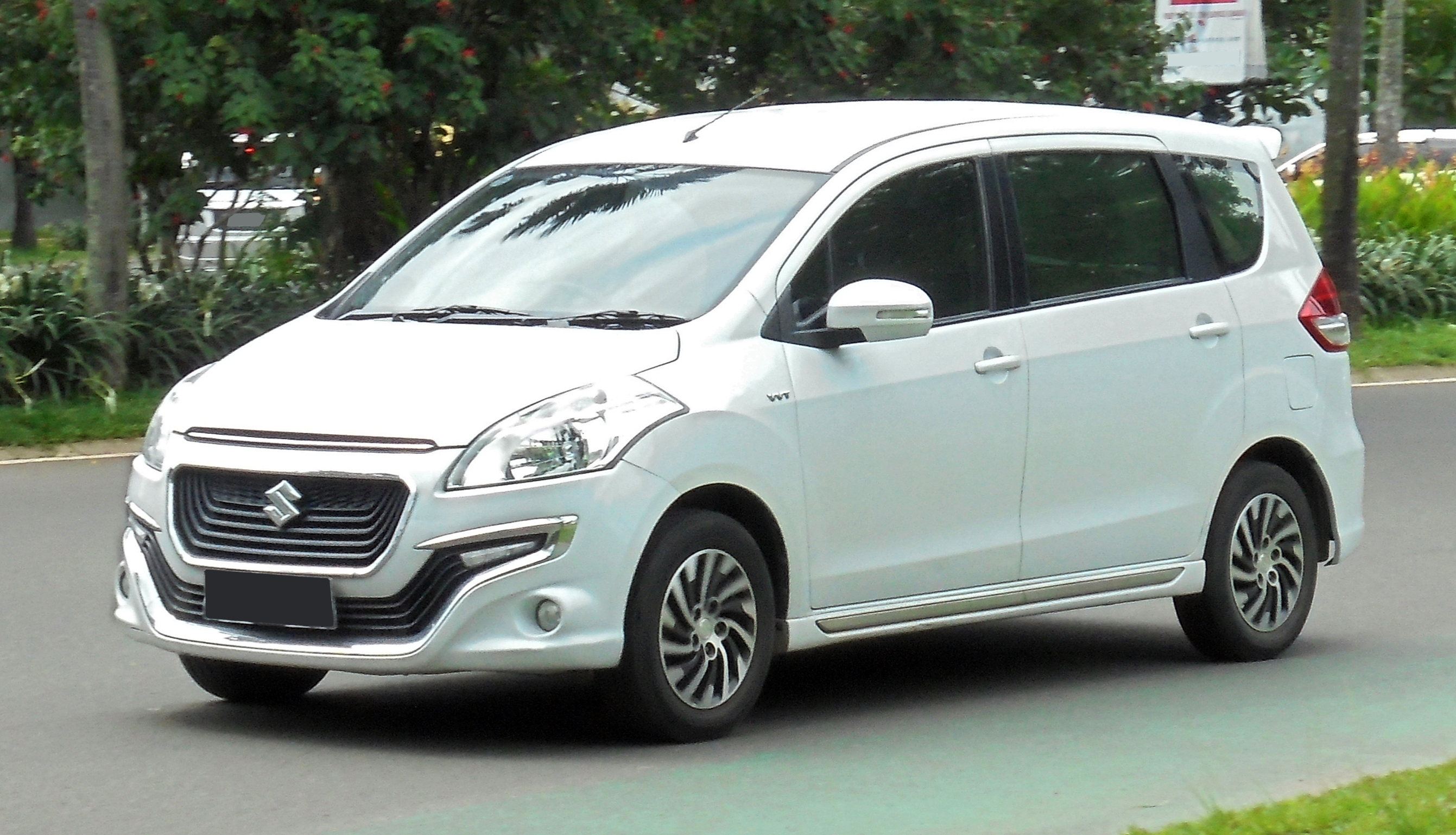
2016 Ertiga Dreza GS (Indonesia)

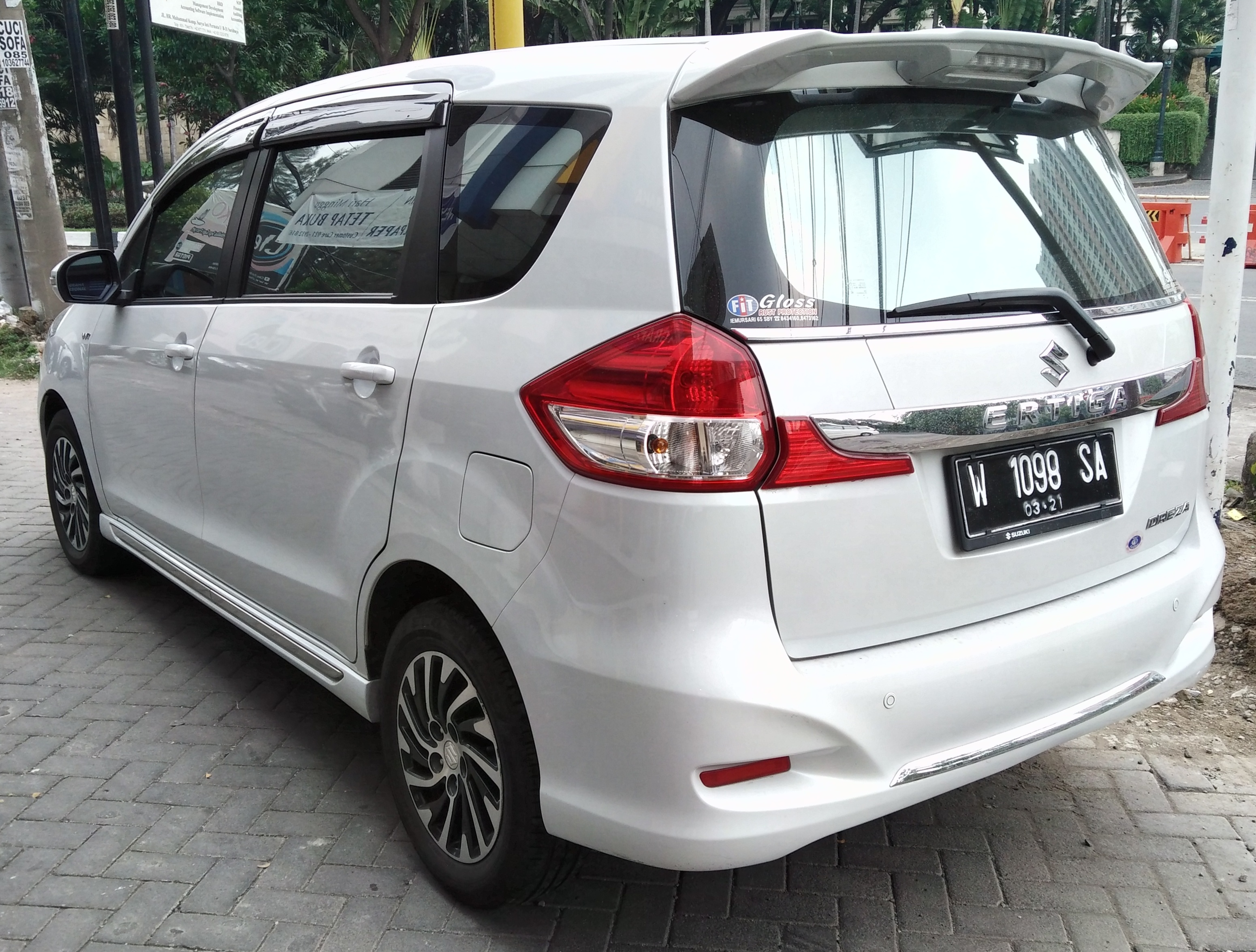
2016 Ertiga Dreza GS (Indonesia)

=== Proton Ertiga ===
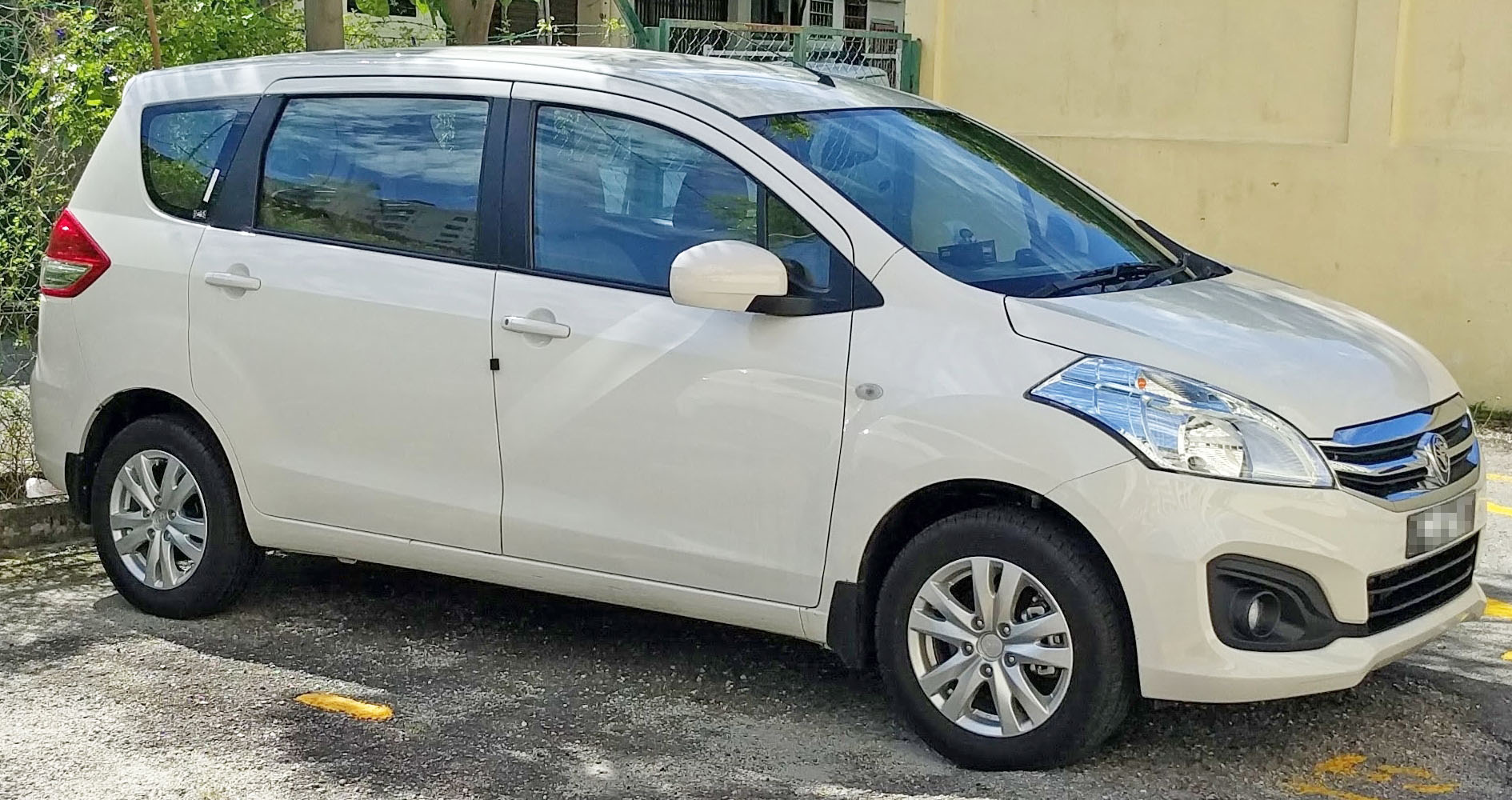
2017 Proton Ertiga (Malaysia)

The Proton Ertiga is a rebadged Ertiga for the Malaysian market by Proton. It was launched on 24 November 2016, at the press conference at the Setia City Convention Centre, Setia Alam, Selangor. It is Proton's fourth model to be launched in a six-month span. It is Malaysia's first mini MPV that qualifies for Malaysia's EEV emissions standard. It can sit up to seven people, but because the middle row middle seat only features a lap belt, it is classified as a six-seater with a 2-2-2 configuration. It uses the same 1.4-litre petrol engine as the Suzuki Ertiga.

The Ertiga was updated in August 2018. It became known as the Ertiga Xtra. The Executive Plus AT variant has been replaced with Premium AT. Changes included a darker upholstery for the seats and a 7-inch touchscreen head unit.

As with the launch of the second generation Suzuki-branded Ertiga, the future production of the Proton-branded Ertiga becomes unpredictable. In September 2019, the Proton Ertiga was discontinued.

=== Mazda VX-1 ===
The Mazda VX-1 was launched on 11 March 2013. Available in two grades: V and R grades. This is a badged engineered version of the Ertiga with additional accessories in exterior. Both grades only available in 5-speed manual option. Both grades received the automatic option in September 2014.

A facelift version was released on 1 March 2016. There are no changes in terms of technical aspects, either exterior, engine or transmission.

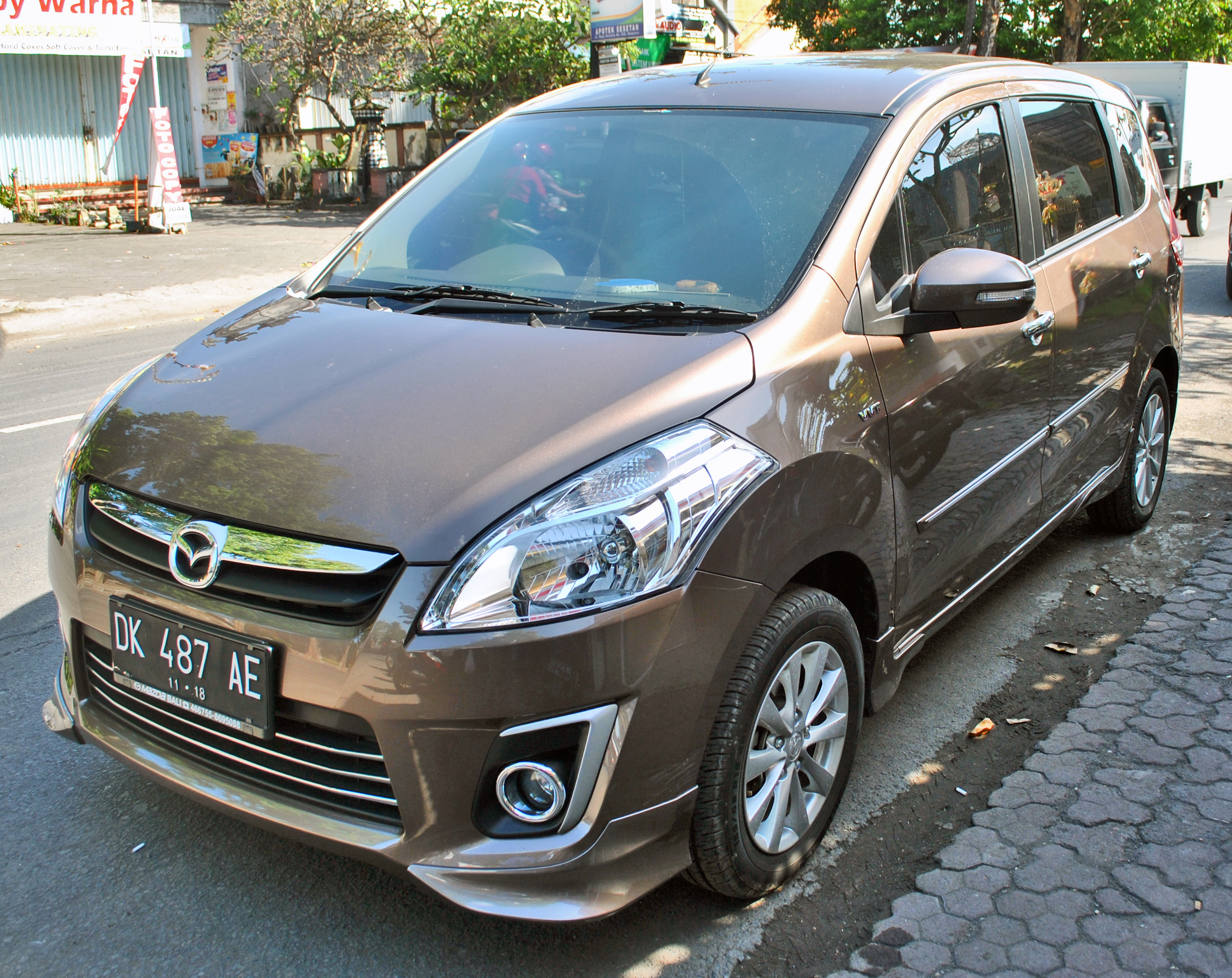
2013 Mazda VX-1 R (ZG81S; pre-facelift, Indonesia)

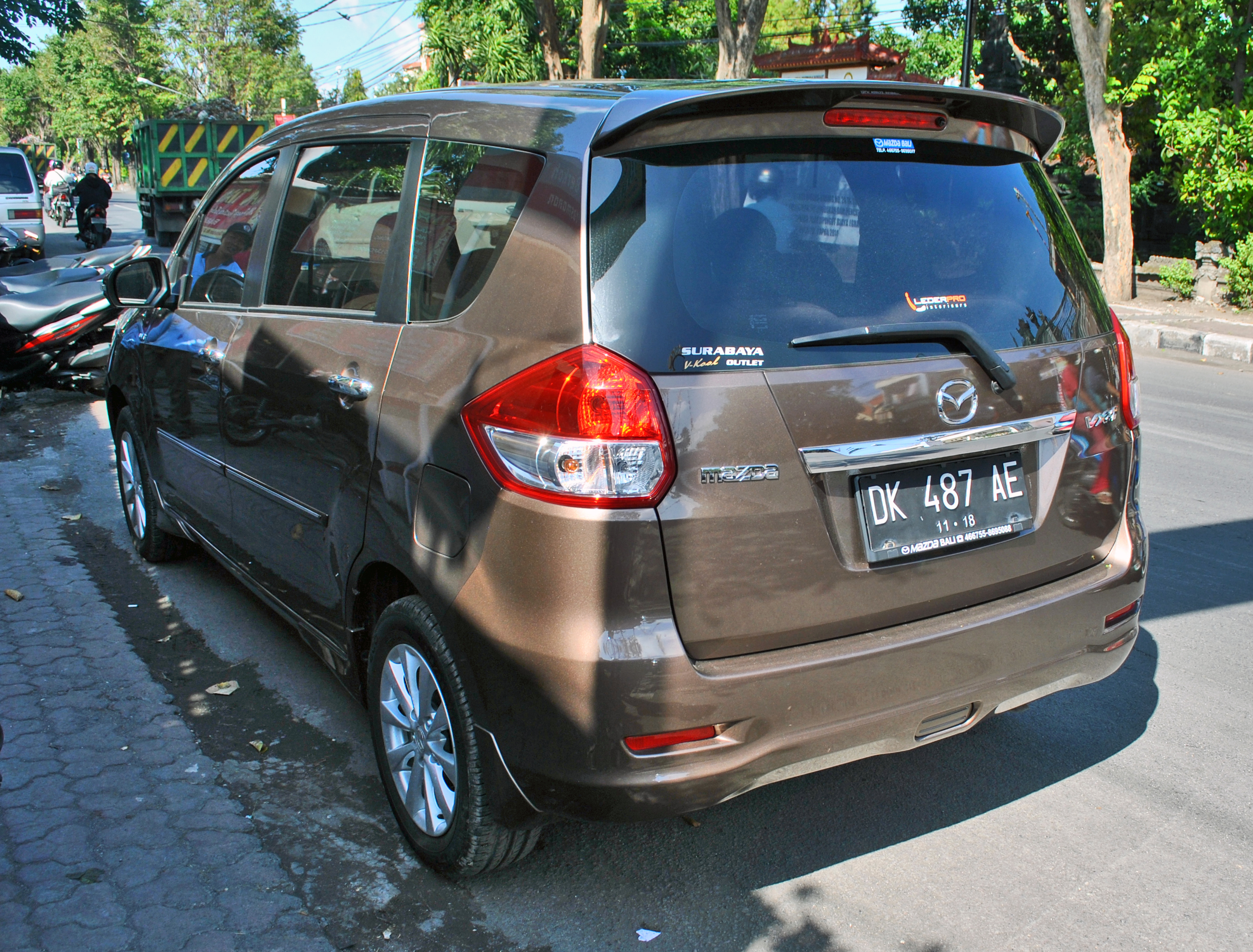
2013 Mazda VX-1 R (ZG81S; pre-facelift, Indonesia)

=== Safety ===
ASEAN NCAP test results Suzuki Eritga (2016)
| Test | Points | Stars |
|---|---|---|
| Adult occupant: | 12.39 | 4 /5 stars |
| Child occupant: | 33% | 2 /5 stars |
| Safety assist: | NA | |

ASEAN NCAP test results Proton Eritga (2016)
| Test | Points | Stars |
|---|---|---|
| Adult occupant: | 12.39 | 4 /5 stars |
| Child occupant: | 33% | 2 /5 stars |
| Safety assist: | NA | |

== Second generation (NC; 2018) ==
Second generation
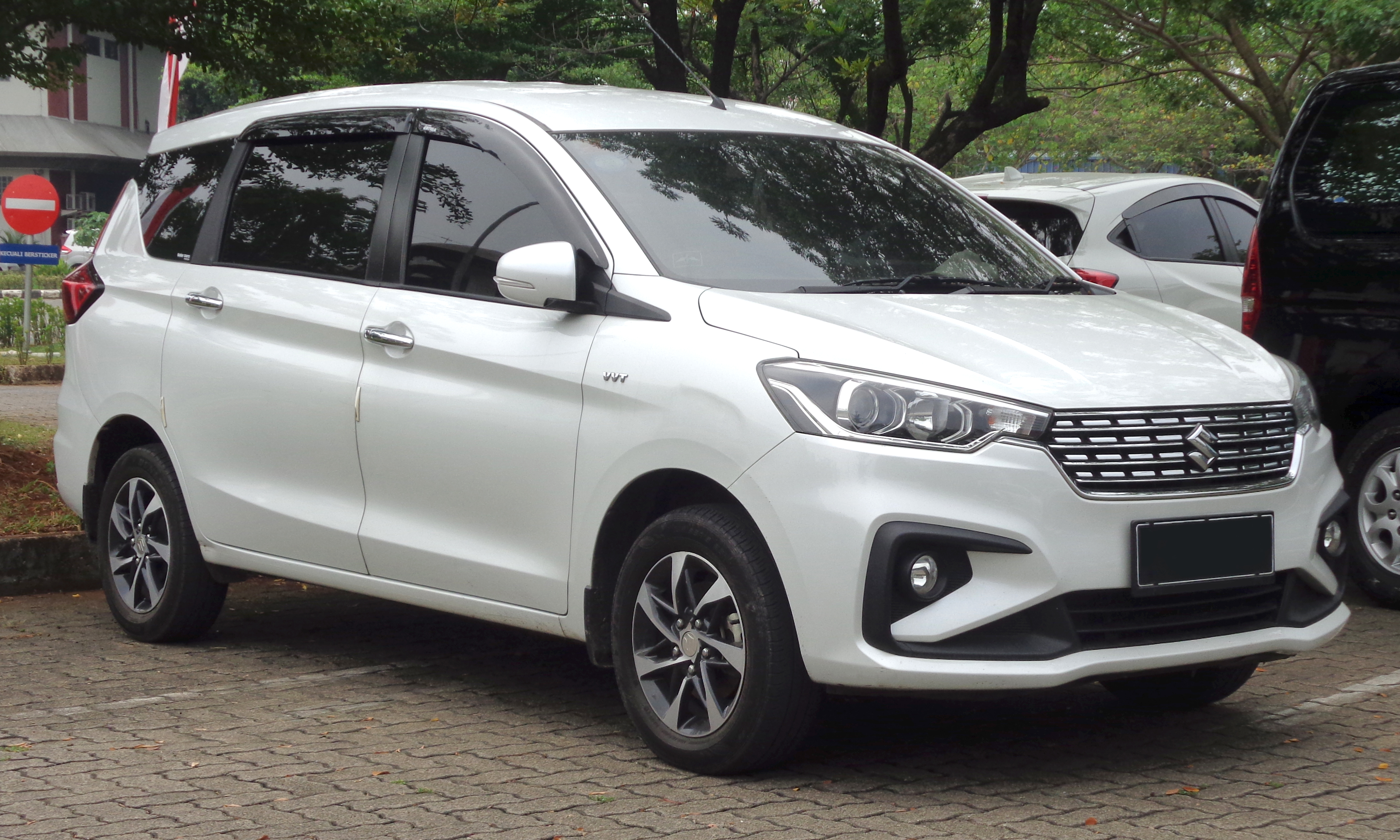
- Suzuki Ertiga GX (pre-facelift, Indonesia)

Overview
- Model code: NC
- Also called: Toyota Rumion (2021–present); Maruti Suzuki Tour M (India; fleet only)
- Production: April 2018 – present
- Assembly: India: Gurgaon (Maruti Suzuki); Indonesia: Bekasi (Suzuki Indomobil Motor Cikarang plant); Myanmar: Thilawa (Suzuki Myanmar)
- Designer: Hiroyuki Tokuda and Koichiro Fukushima (exterior); Isamu Ogawa and Tatsuo Kobayashi (interior)

Body and chassis
- Platform: Heartect
- Related: Suzuki Swift (third generation); Suzuki Dzire (third generation)

Powertrain
- Engine: Petrol: 1462 cc K15B I4; 1462 cc K15B I4 MHEV; 1462 cc K15C Dualjet I4 MHEV; Diesel: 1248 cc D13A turbo-diesel I4 MHEV; 1498 cc E15A turbo-diesel I4; Petrol/CNG: 1462 cc K15B I4; 1462 cc K15C Dualjet I4
- Electric motor: Integrated Starter Generator (ISG)
- Transmission: 5-speed manual; 6-speed manual; 4-speed automatic; 6-speed automatic
- Hybrid drivetrain: 12-volt mild hybrid (MHEV) Smart Hybrid Vehicle by Suzuki (SHVS)
- Battery: 6-10 Ah lithium-ion

Dimensions
- Wheelbase: 2,740 mm (107.9 in)
- Length: 4,395 mm (173.0 in); 4,435 mm (174.6 in) (2025 improvement); 4,470 mm (176.0 in) (Suzuki Sport)
- Width: 1,735 mm (68.3 in)
- Height: 1,690 mm (66.5 in)
- Curb weight: 1,135–1,225 kg (2,502–2,701 lb) (petrol); 1,220–1,245 kg (2,690–2,745 lb) (diesel); 1,235–1,275 kg (2,723–2,811 lb) (CNG)

Chronology
- Predecessor: Toyota Avanza (South Africa, Rumion)

The second-generation Ertiga was unveiled at the 26th Indonesia International Motor Show in Jakarta on 19 April 2018. It is built on the HEARTECT platform, with the development led by chief engineer Satoshi Kasahara. This generation is 130 mm longer, 40 mm wider and 5 mm taller than the outgoing model. The engine is also changed to bigger 1.5-litre unit for both petrol and diesel variants.

The Indian-built Ertiga is exported to South Asia, Africa and the Middle East, whereas the Indonesian-built version is exported to the Southeast Asia, Pacific Islands, Mexico, Caribbean and Latin America. It is also continued to be assembled in Myanmar for the local market.

The facelifted model appeared in April 2022. The exterior and interior received minor refreshments. Depending on the market, the engine, transmission, safety and convenience features are also improved.

In July 2025, the Ertiga was updated with six airbags as standard. This new model can be identified by a new rear quarter panel with a thicker D-pillar (40 mm longer) to accommodate the safety improvement and an additional rear upper spoiler as standard. For the interior, the AC vents were relocated behind the console box for the second row and beside the arm rests for the third row. The changes were only applied to the Indian-produced Ertiga, including for exports to Middle East and Africa.

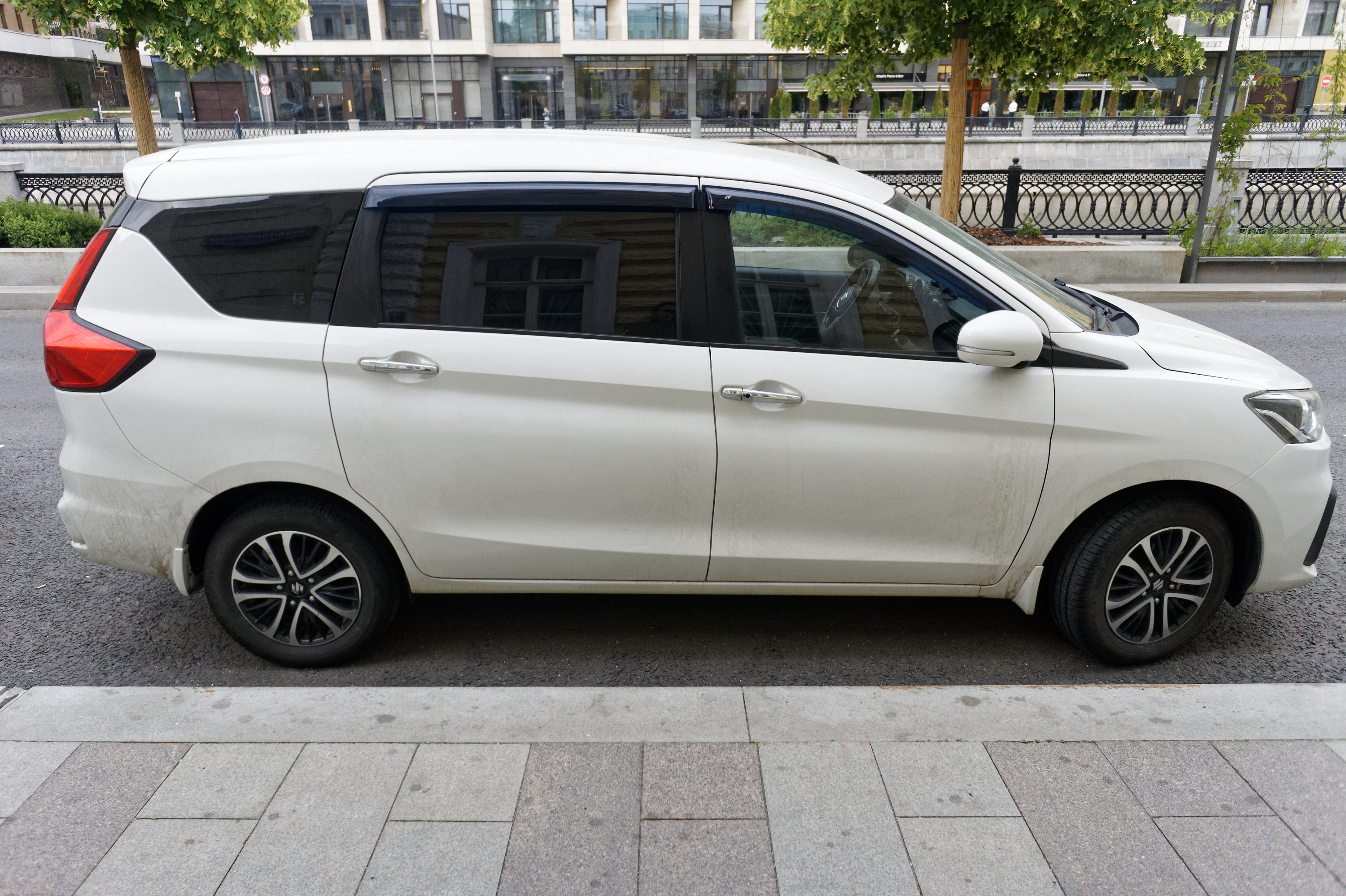
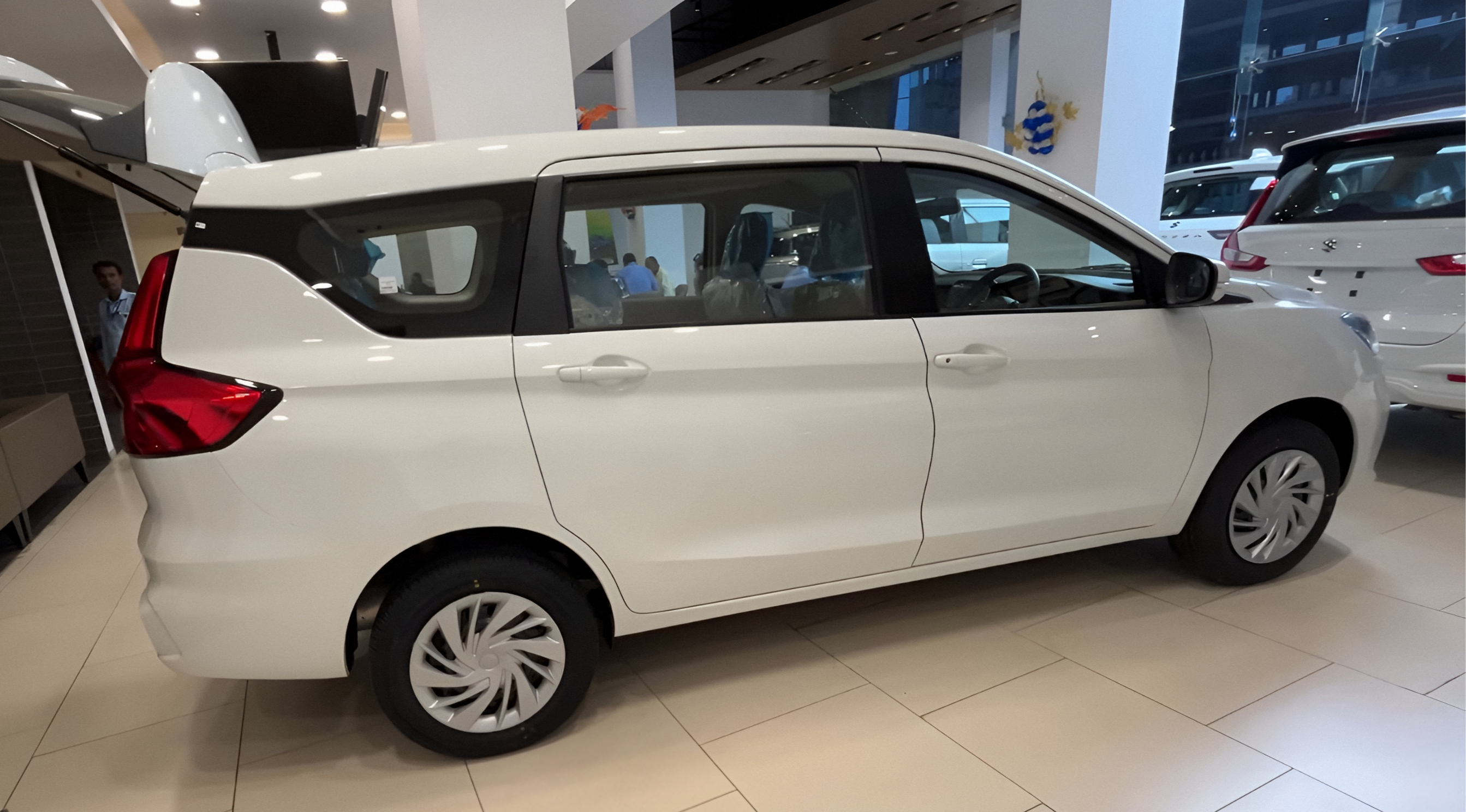
The original 2018 model (left) and the 2025 updated model with a longer body (right).

=== Markets ===
==== India ====
The second generation Ertiga was launched in India on 21 November 2018, it is locally assembled by Maruti Suzuki and sold exclusively at Maruti Suzuki Arena dealerships. For India, the second generation Ertiga is available in eight trim levels with each engine version has four trim levels: LXi, VXi, ZXi and ZXi+ for the K15B 1.5-litre petrol engine, and LDi, VDi, ZDi and ZDi+ for the D15A 1.3-litre turbocharged diesel engine. For transmission, all variants comes as standard with a 5-speed manual, however the VXi and ZXi trim levels have the option of a 4-speed automatic. Both the petrol and the diesel engines comes equipped with mild hybrid technology by Suzuki called as Smart Hybrid Vehicle by Suzuki.

In March 2019, the base LDi and LXi trim levels were both discontinued.

In April 2019, the E15A 1.5-litre turbocharged diesel engine paired to a 6-speed manual was made available for the VDi, ZDi and ZDi+ trim levels. However, it was discontinued in March 2020 due to Bharat Stage 6 implementation.

In August 2019, the D15A 1.3-litre turbocharged diesel engine was discontinued. The Tour M trim was added, based on VXi trim, aimed for commercial fleet buyers such as taxis.

In April 2022, the Ertiga for the Indian market received a minor facelift; trim levels remained the same. For engines, the facelifted Ertiga received the new K15C Dualjet 1.5-litre MHEV petrol engine and a new compressed natural gas (CNG) engine. The model surpassed 10 lakh total sales figure in February 2024, and was the top selling car in October 2024 for the second month running with numbers of 18,785 units.

==== Indonesia ====
The second generation Ertiga went on sale in Indonesia on 8 May 2018, with three trim levels available at launch the same as the first generation Ertiga: GA (with manual only), GL (with manual/automatic) and GX (with manual/automatic). The GX trim had the option of an ESP safety feature. All variants are powered by a K15B 1.5-litre petrol engine.

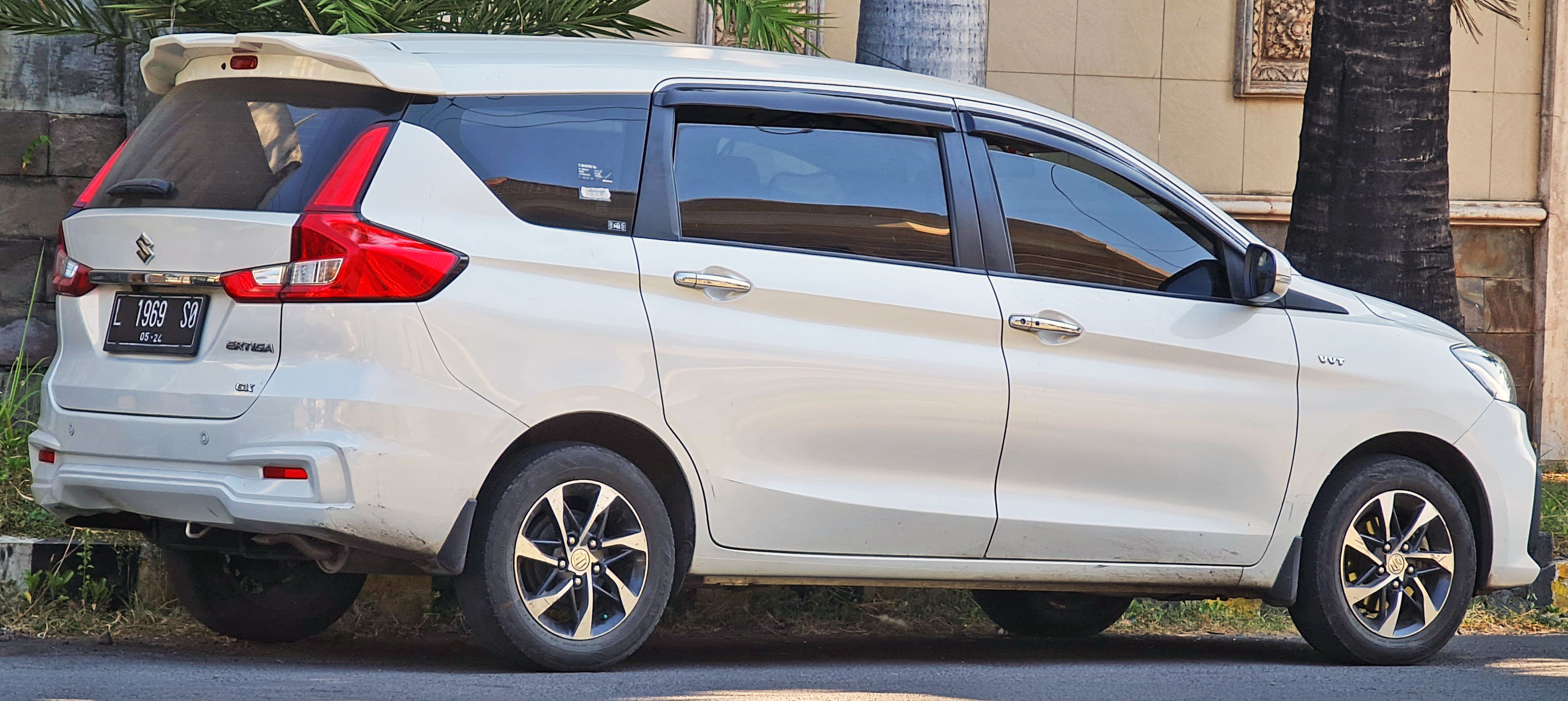
2019 Ertiga GX with two-tone black polished alloy wheels (Indonesia)

In February 2019, the Ertiga range received a number of improvements. The GL trim received front fog lights. Both the GL and GX trim levels received new foldable grip handles for the first and second row along with additional hand grips for the third row. The GX trim received new dual-tone alloy wheel designs, a rear defogger, automatic climate control in digital format and a 6.8-inch touchscreen infotainment system from JVC with flatter bezels.

In March 2019, a new Suzuki Sport (SS) trim was added after being displayed as a concept at the 26th Gaikindo Indonesia International Auto Show in August 2018. The Suzuki Sport (SS) trim based on the GX trim adds on a front mesh grille, LED daytime running lights in fog-light housing, a sportier bodykit, a backup camera, a black interior with wood trim pieces and comes as standard with ESP.

In January 2020, the Ertiga line-up received a number of improvements. The GA trim received only new foldable handgrips for first and second rows along with additional hand grips in the third row. GL trim received digital format controls for the air conditioner. The GX trim received a black interior with wood trim pieces and a larger 8-inch touchscreen infotainment system. The GL, GX and SS trim levels received an armrest for the second row seats. The Pearl Glorious Brown colour was replaced by Brave Khaki colour for the GL and GX trim levels.

In November 2021, a limited edition Suzuki Sport Finest Form (FF) variant was unveiled and limited to 125 units. The car is based on Suzuki Sport (SS) trim with new cosmetic upgrades such as dual tone white and black colour, red accents on the exterior, new black grille, seats with red accents and additional smart rear view E-Mirror from the XL7 Alpha.

The facelifted Ertiga debuted in Indonesia on 10 June 2022, with the same trim levels from the pre-facelift model. The K15B 1.5-litre MHEV petrol is available for the first time in Indonesia for the GX and SS trim levels, while the GA and GL trim levels still powered by the K15B 1.5-litre petrol engine.

At the 31st Indonesia International Motor Show in February 2024, the Suzuki Sport trim was replaced by a new Cruise trim, which was introduced with new body kit. The lithium-ion battery capacity for the mild hybrid model was also enlarged to 10 Ah.

==== Mexico ====
The second generation Ertiga was released in Mexico on 10 November 2018, with two trim levels: GLS (with manual/automatic) and GLX (with automatic only); it is powered by a K15B 1.5-litre petrol engine.

The facelifted Ertiga launched in Mexico on 14 November 2022, with the same trim levels from the pre-facelift model. All variants are powered by a K15B 1.5-litre MHEV petrol engine marketed as the Ertiga Boostergreen in Mexico.

==== Philippines ====
The second generation Ertiga was launched in the Philippines on 23 January 2019, with three trim levels available at launch: GA (with manual only), GL (with manual/automatic) and GLX (with automatic only); it is powered by a K15B 1.5-litre petrol engine.

In March 2020, the Ertiga line-up was updated in Philippines. The GA trim received new designs for the steel wheels. The GL trim receives a second-row armrest. The GLX trim receives dual-tone 15-inch alloy wheels and automatic climate control.

The facelifted Ertiga debuted in the Philippines on 16 January 2023 with the same trim levels as the pre-facelift. All variants are powered by a K15B 1.5-litre petrol MHEV engine. In September 2026, the GLX Hybrid Sport variant was introduced equipped with Suzuki Sport exterior accessories.

==== South Africa ====
The second generation Ertiga was launched in South Africa on 8 March 2019, with two trim levels available at launch: GA (with manual only) and GL (With manual/automatic); it is powered by a K15B 1.5-litre petrol engine.

In September 2019, the flagship GLX trim was added, it is available with either a 5-speed manual or 4-speed automatic.

The facelifted Ertiga launched in South Africa on 18 July 2022. For the facelift model, the GLX trim was discontinued and the GL trim received a few exterior design changes and additional interior features.

==== Thailand ====
The second generation Ertiga was launched in Thailand on 6 February 2019, with two trim available: GL and GX; it is powered by a K15B 1.5-litre petrol engine paired only to a 4-speed automatic.

The facelifted Ertiga debuted in Thailand on 30 November 2022, with the same trim levels from the pre-facelift model. All variants are powered by a K15B 1.5-litre petrol MHEV engine.

==== Vietnam ====
The second generation Ertiga was launched in Vietnam on 29 June 2019, with two trim levels available at launch: GL (with manual) and GLX (with automatic); it is powered by a K15B 1.5-litre petrol engine.

In February 2020, the Ertiga line-up was updated in Vietnam. The GL trim received a second-row armrest and a 6.2-inch touchscreen infotainment system with a reversing camera. The GLX trim received 15-inch dual-tone alloy wheels, 10-inch touchscreen infotainment system and automatic climate control.

The facelifted Ertiga launched in Vietnam in September 2022, with three variants: Hybrid M/T, Hybrid A/T and Hybrid Sport Limited A/T. All variants are powered by a K15B 1.5-litre petrol MHEV engine.

=== Safety ===
==== Global NCAP ====
The Ertiga for India received 3 stars for adult occupants and 3 stars for toddlers from Global NCAP 1.0 in 2019 (similar to Latin NCAP 2013).

Global NCAP 1.0 test results (India) Maruti Suzuki Ertiga – 2 Airbags (2019, similar to Latin NCAP 2013)
| Test | Score | Stars |
|---|---|---|
| Adult occupant protection | 9.25/17.00 | 3 /5 stars |
| Child occupant protection | 25.16/49.00 | 3 /5 stars |

The African version of the Ertiga received 1 star for adults and 2 stars for toddlers from Global NCAP 2.0 in 2024 (similar to Latin NCAP 2016).

Global NCAP 2.0 test results (South Africa) Maruti Suzuki Ertiga – 2 Airbags (2024, similar to Latin NCAP 2016)
| Test | Score | Stars |
|---|---|---|
| Adult occupant protection | 23.63/34.00 | 1 /5 stars |
| Child occupant protection | 19.40/49.00 | 2 /5 stars |

==== ASEAN NCAP ====
The ASEAN version of the Ertiga received 4 stars from ASEAN NCAP in 2019:

ASEAN NCAP test results Suzuki Ertiga (2019)
| Test | Points |
|---|---|
| Overall: | 4 /5 stars |
| Adult occupant: | 35.66 |
| Child occupant: | 18.85 |
| Safety assist: | 10.90 |

=== Gallery ===
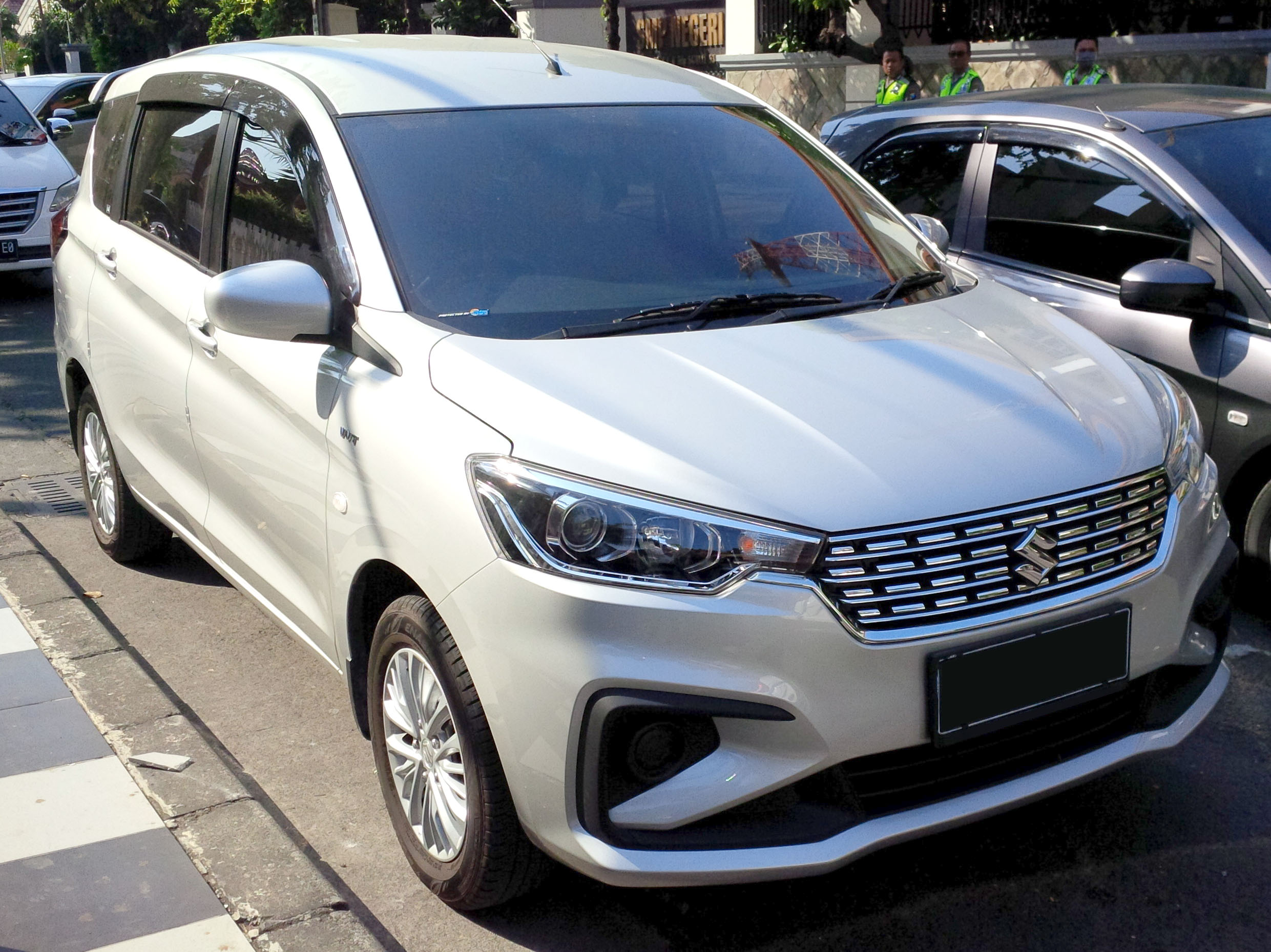
Ertiga GL (pre-facelift, Indonesia)

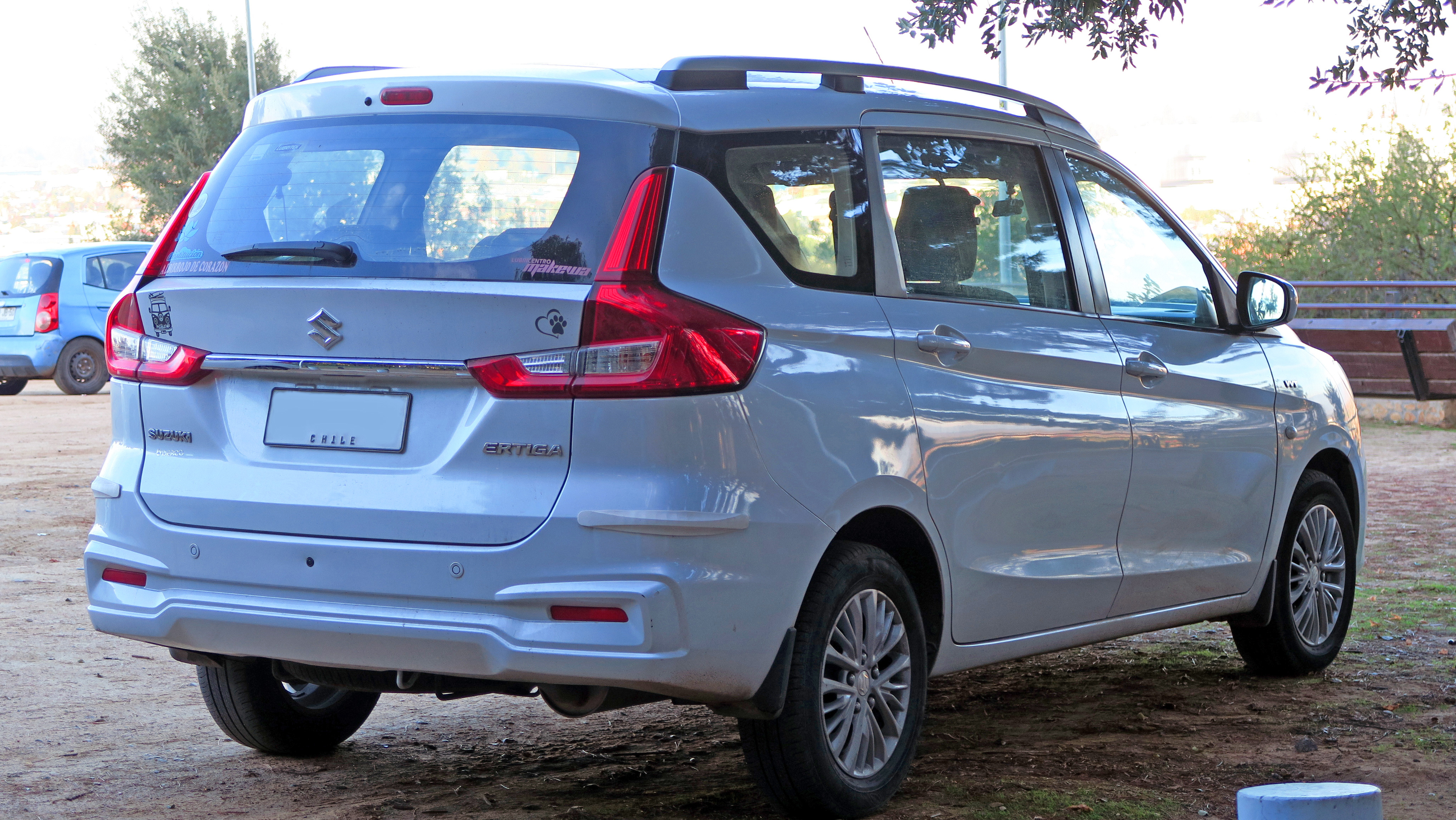
Ertiga GL (pre-facelift, Chile)

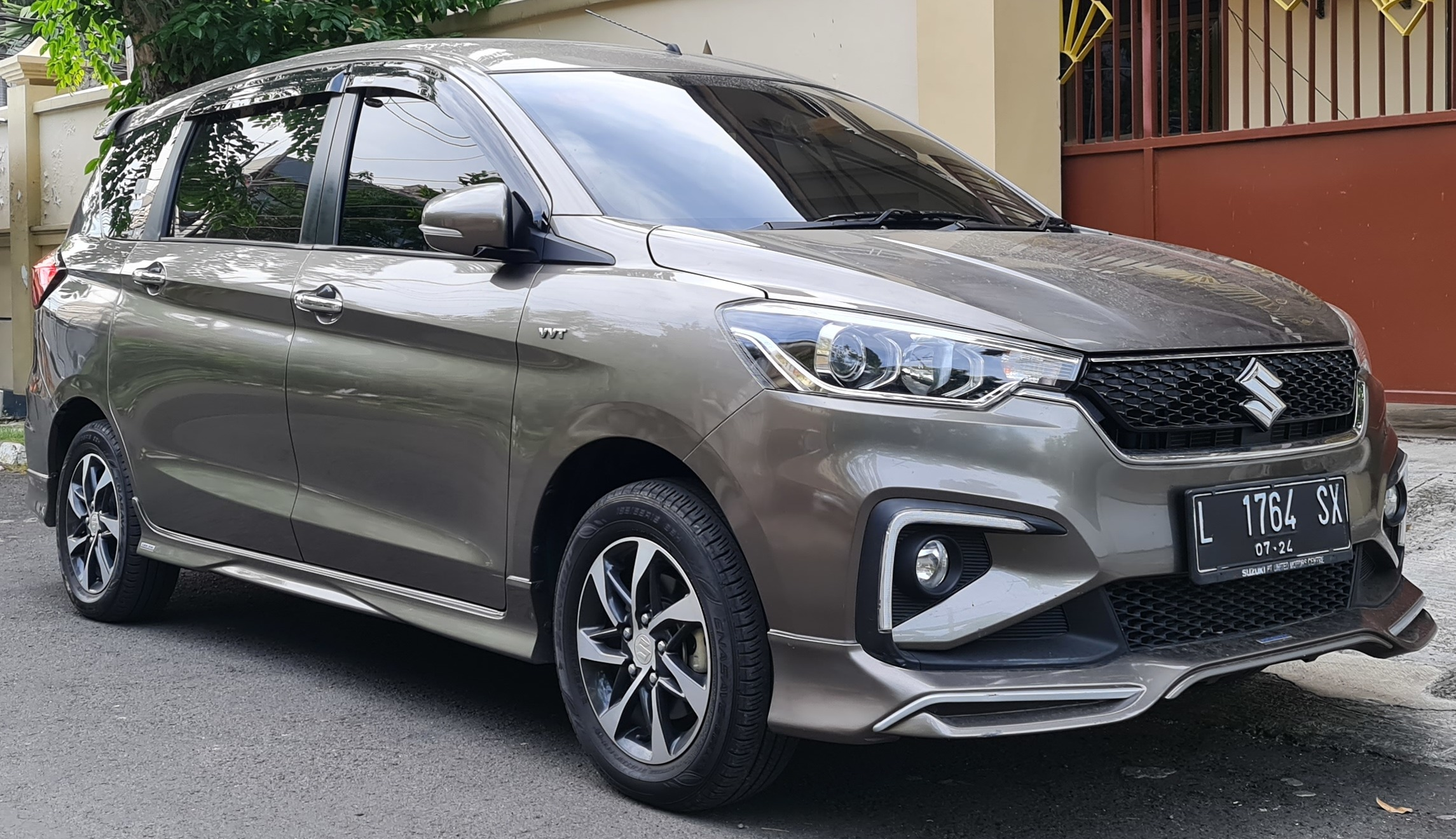
Ertiga Suzuki Sport (pre-facelift, Indonesia)

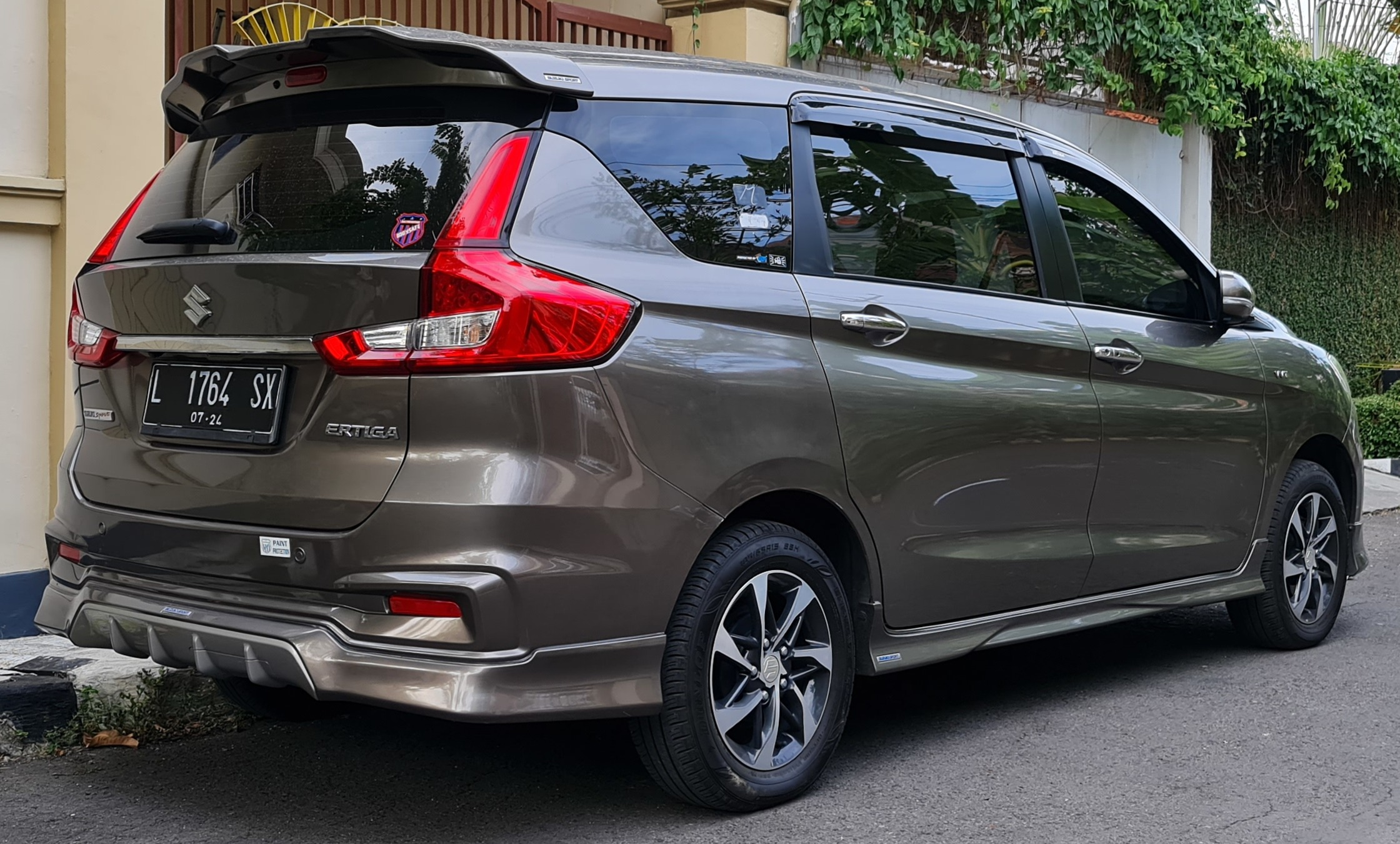
Ertiga Suzuki Sport (pre-facelift, Indonesia)

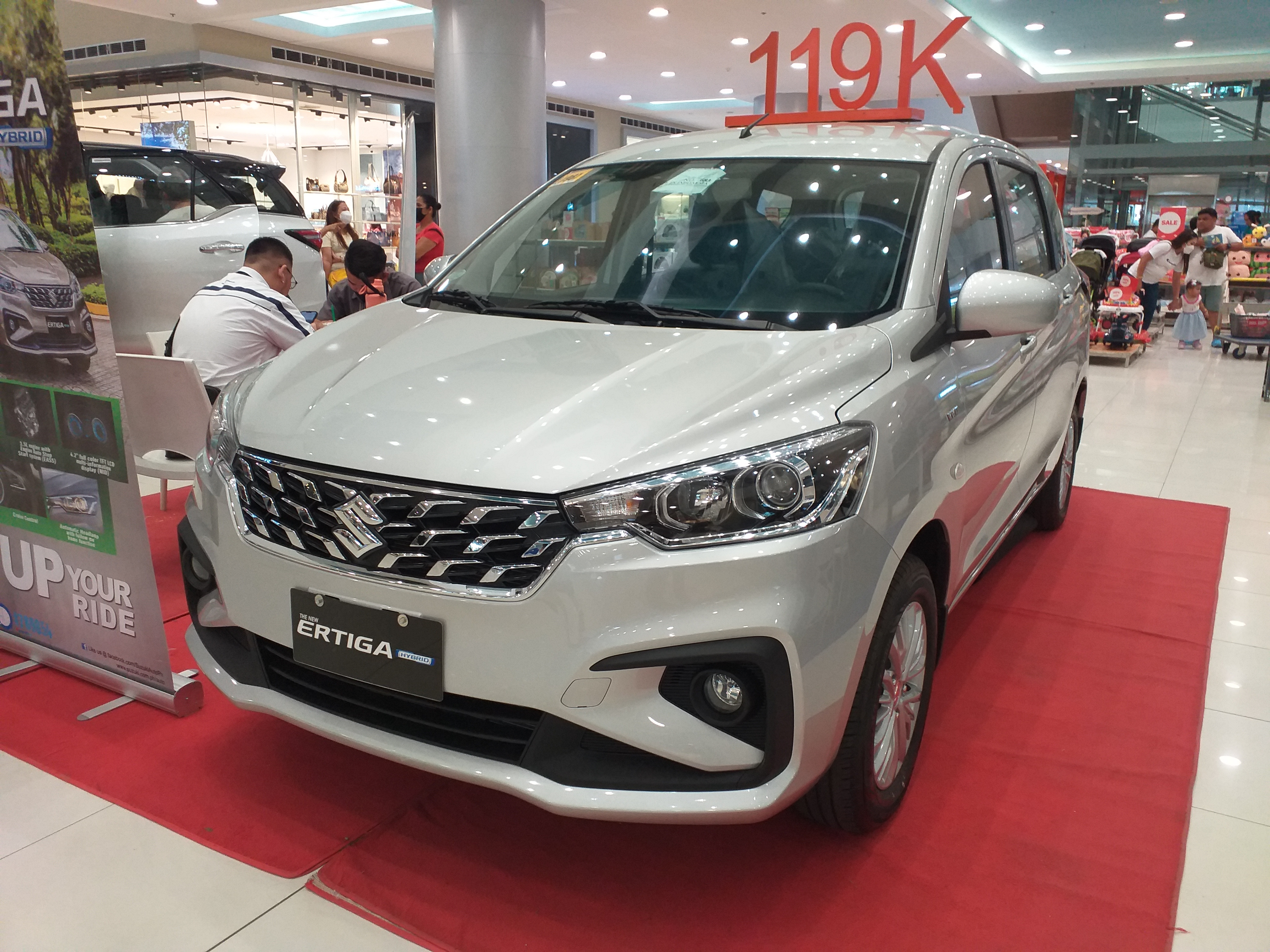
Ertiga GL Hybrid (facelift, Philippines)

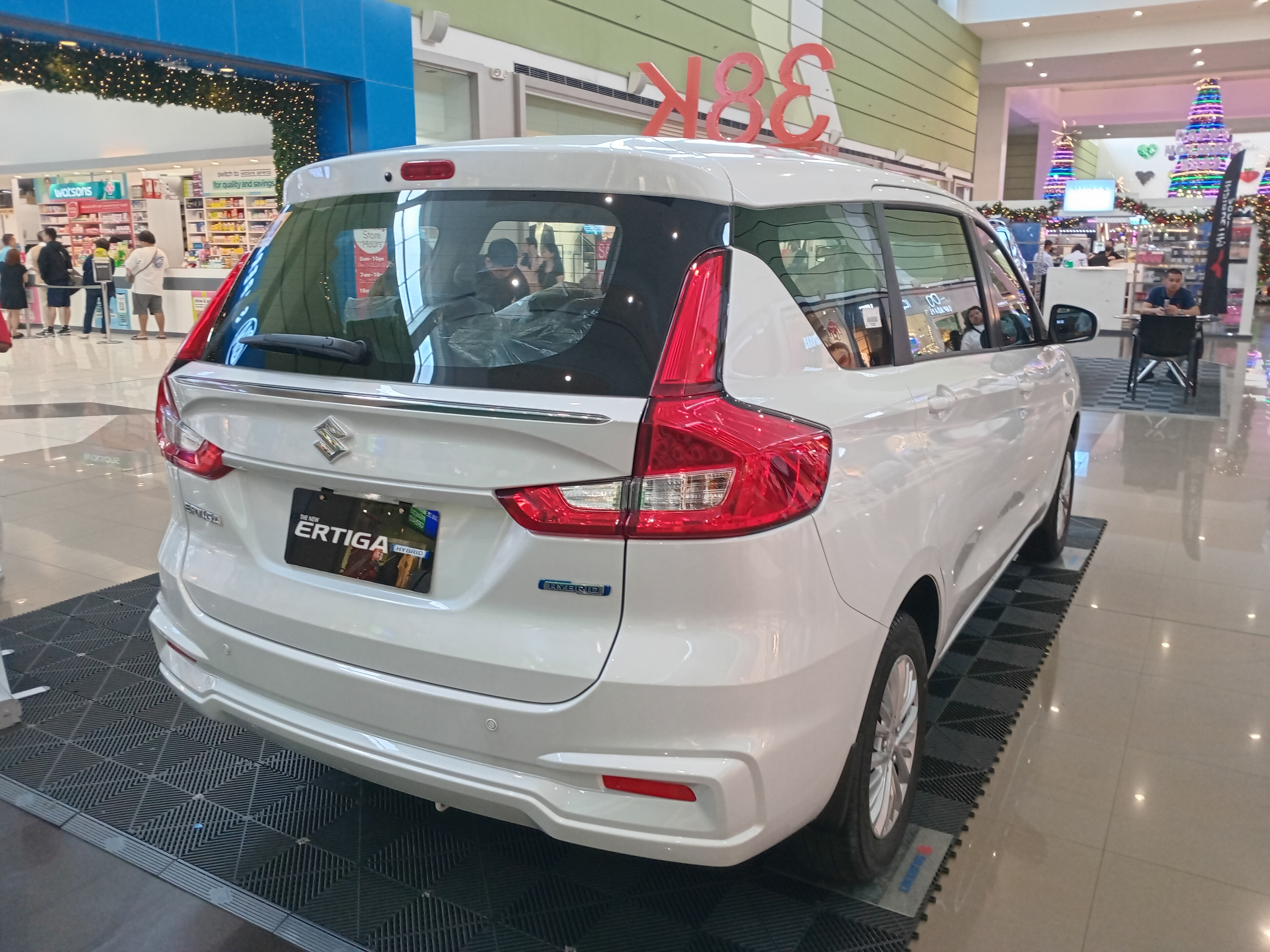
Ertiga GL Hybrid (facelift, Philippines)

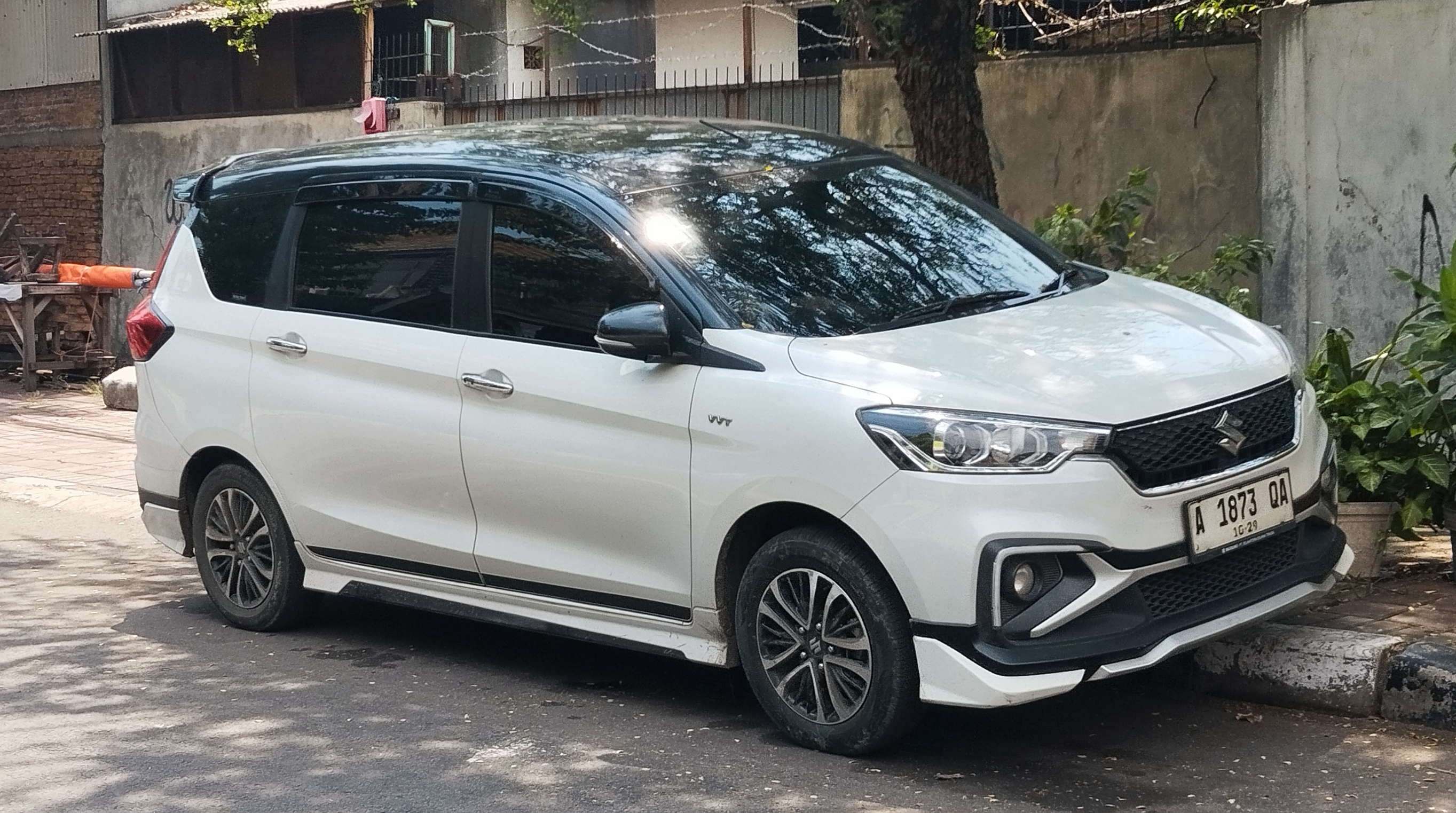
Ertiga Cruise Hybrid (facelift, Indonesia)

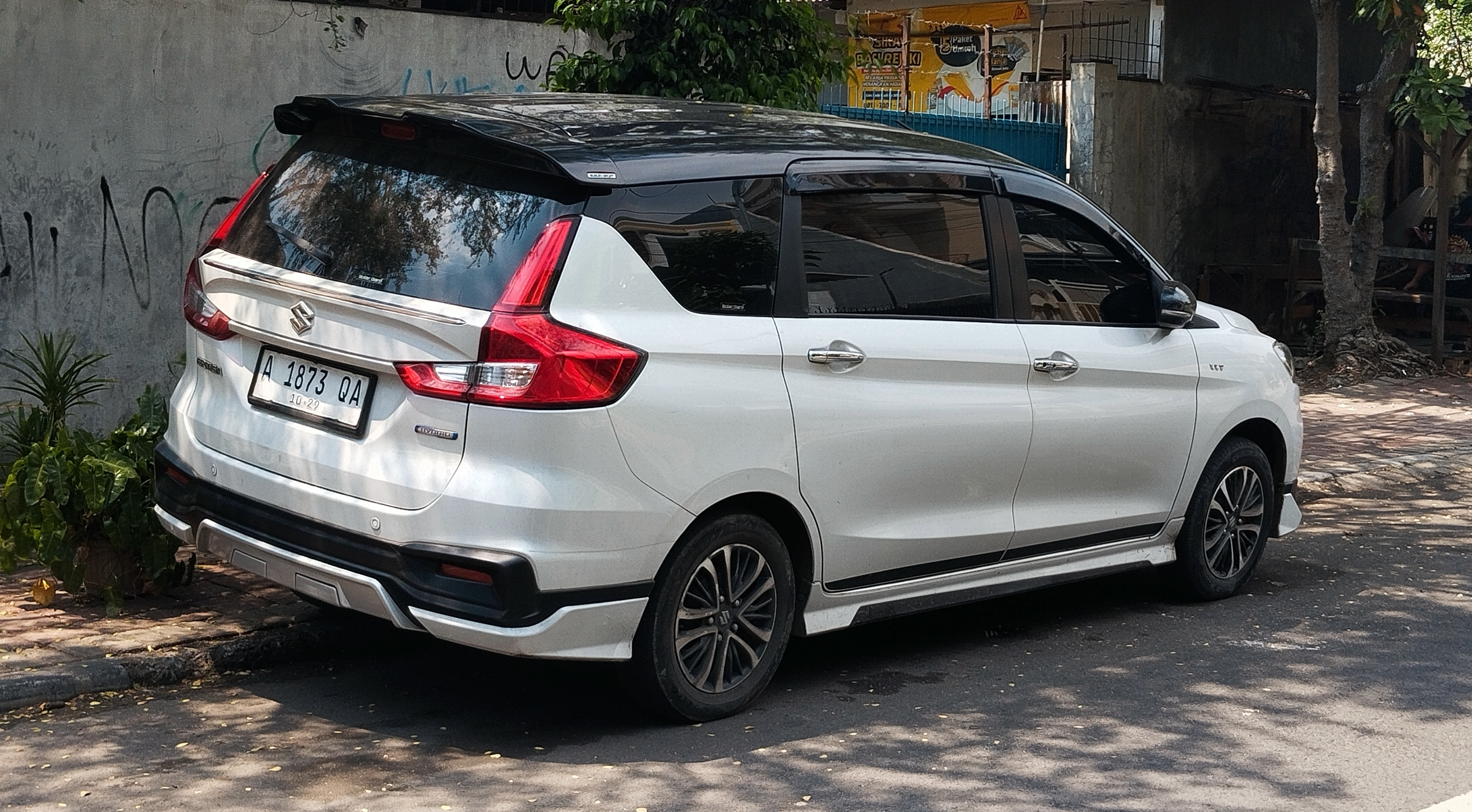
Ertiga Cruise Hybrid (facelift, Indonesia)

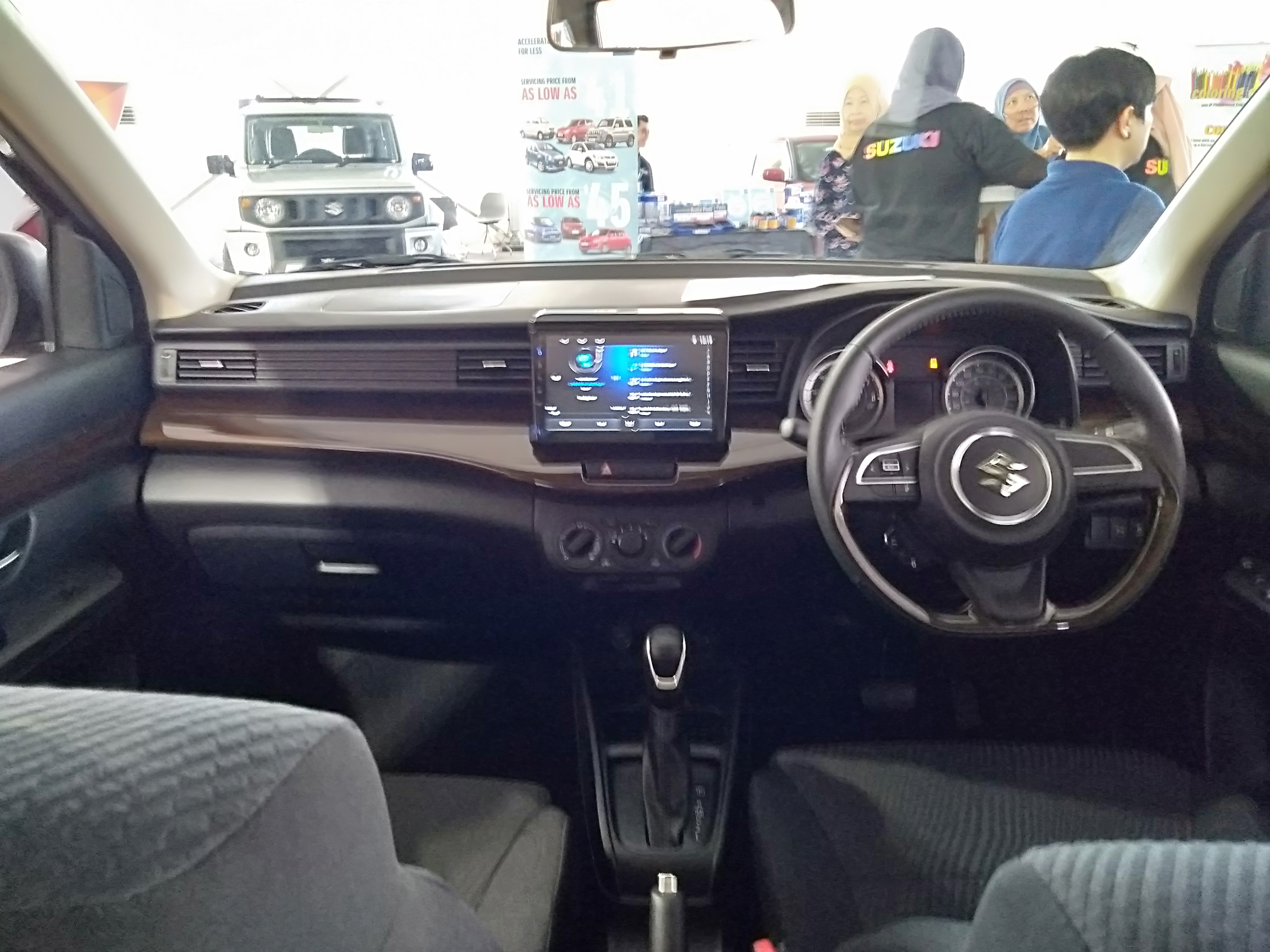
Interior (Brunei, pre-facelift)

=== Toyota Rumion ===
The Indian-built second-generation Ertiga is rebadged and marketed by Toyota as the Toyota Rumion, which is offered as an entry-level MPV model in various African countries. The "Rumion" nameplate was previously used for the Japanese market Corolla Rumion hatchback. It debuted in October 2021 in South Africa, which the model is offered in S, SX and TX trim levels. It was also introduced in Egypt in January 2022.

The facelifted Rumion with a differentiated front fascia from the Ertiga was launched on 7 July 2023. This model has also been sold in India since 10 August 2023 and went on to reach 10,295 units sold by September 2024.

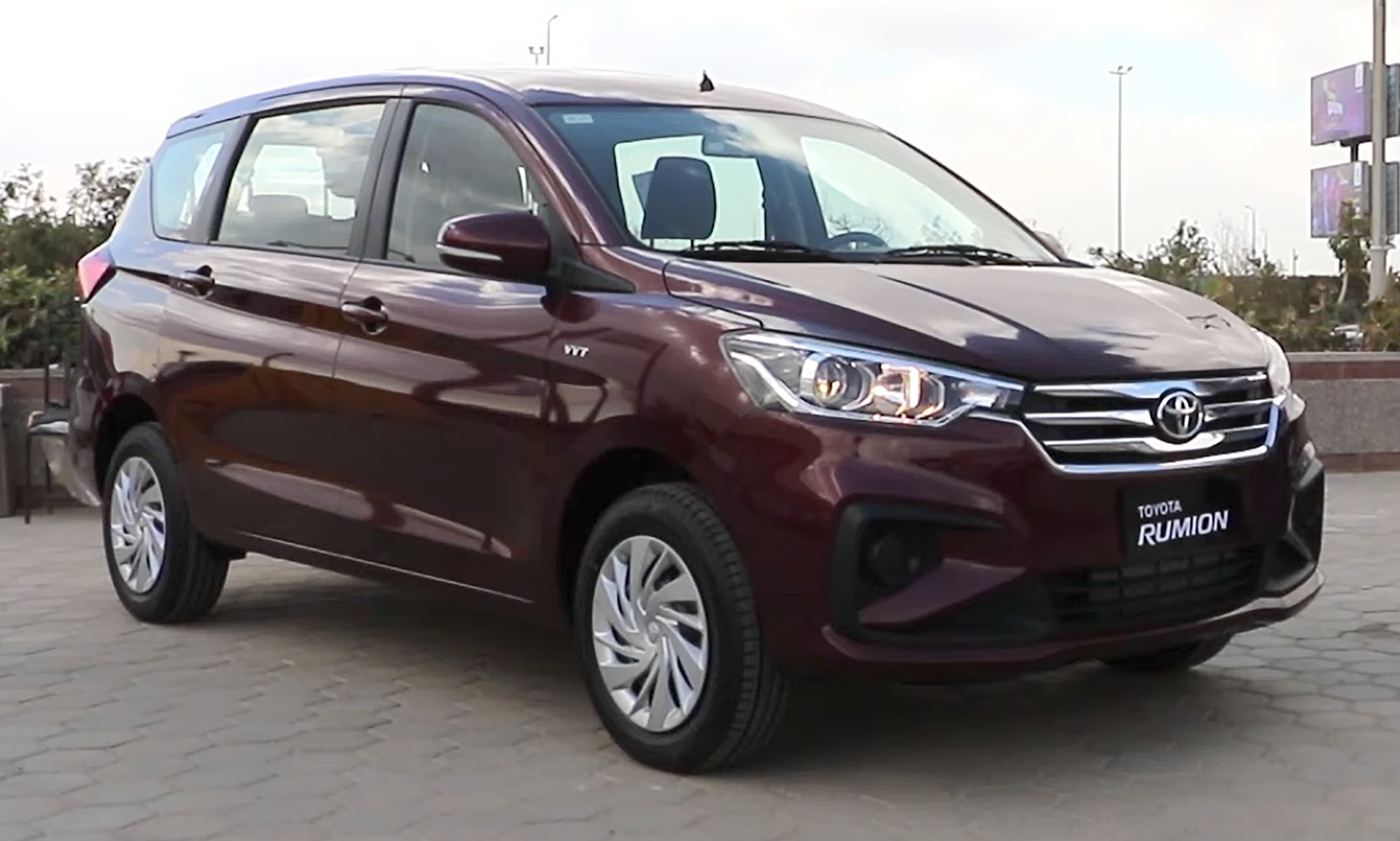
Toyota Rumion (pre-facelift, Egypt)

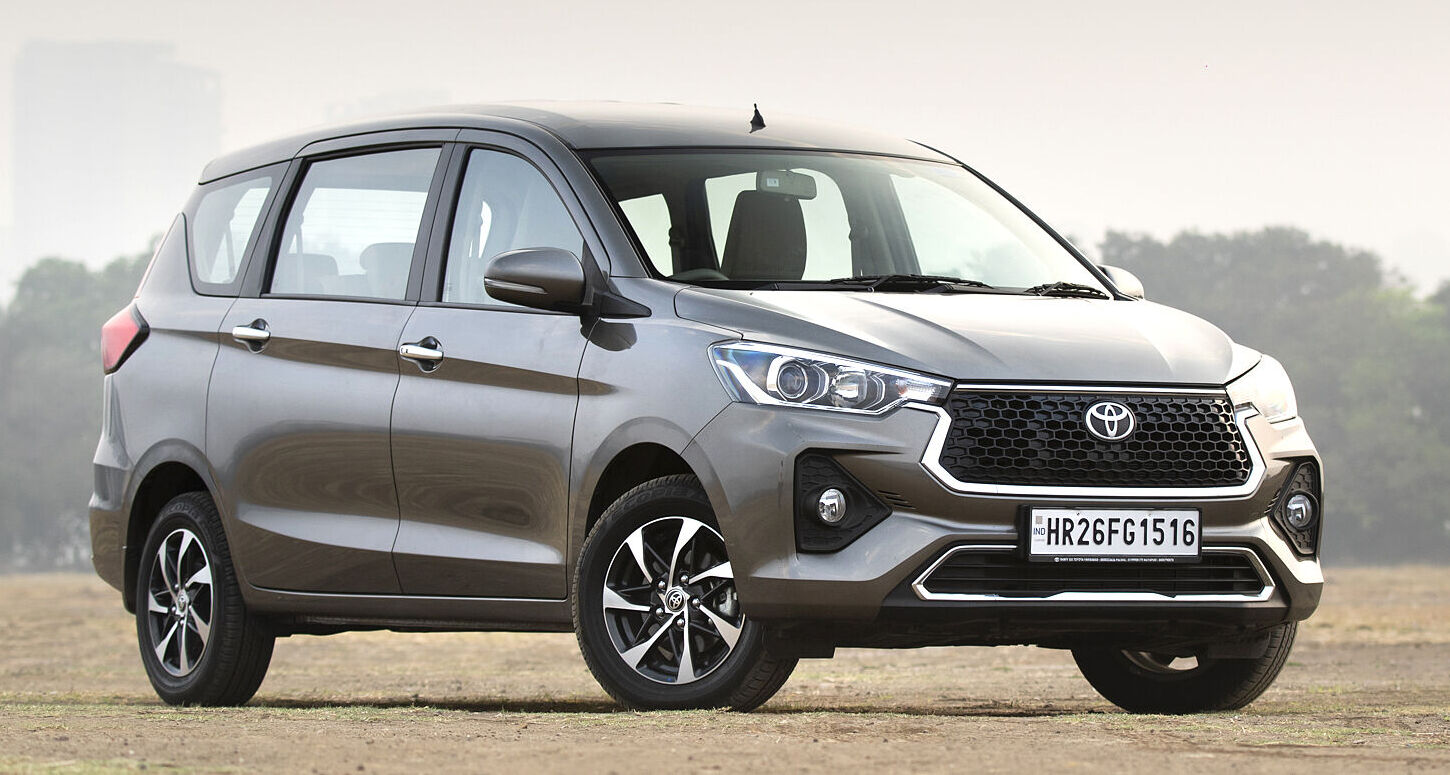
Toyota Rumion (facelift, India)

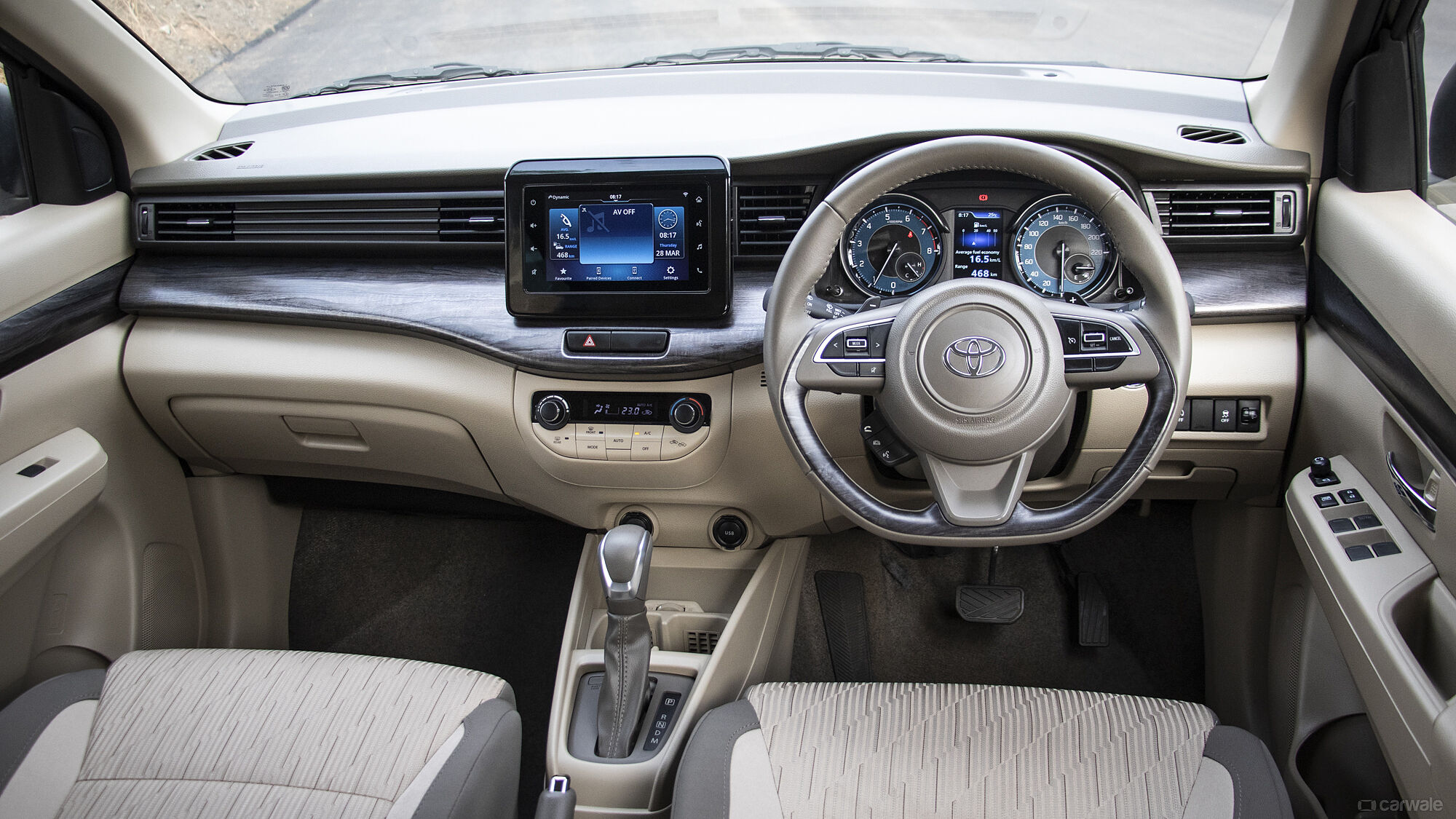
Interior

=== XL6/XL7 ===
Suzuki XL6/XL7
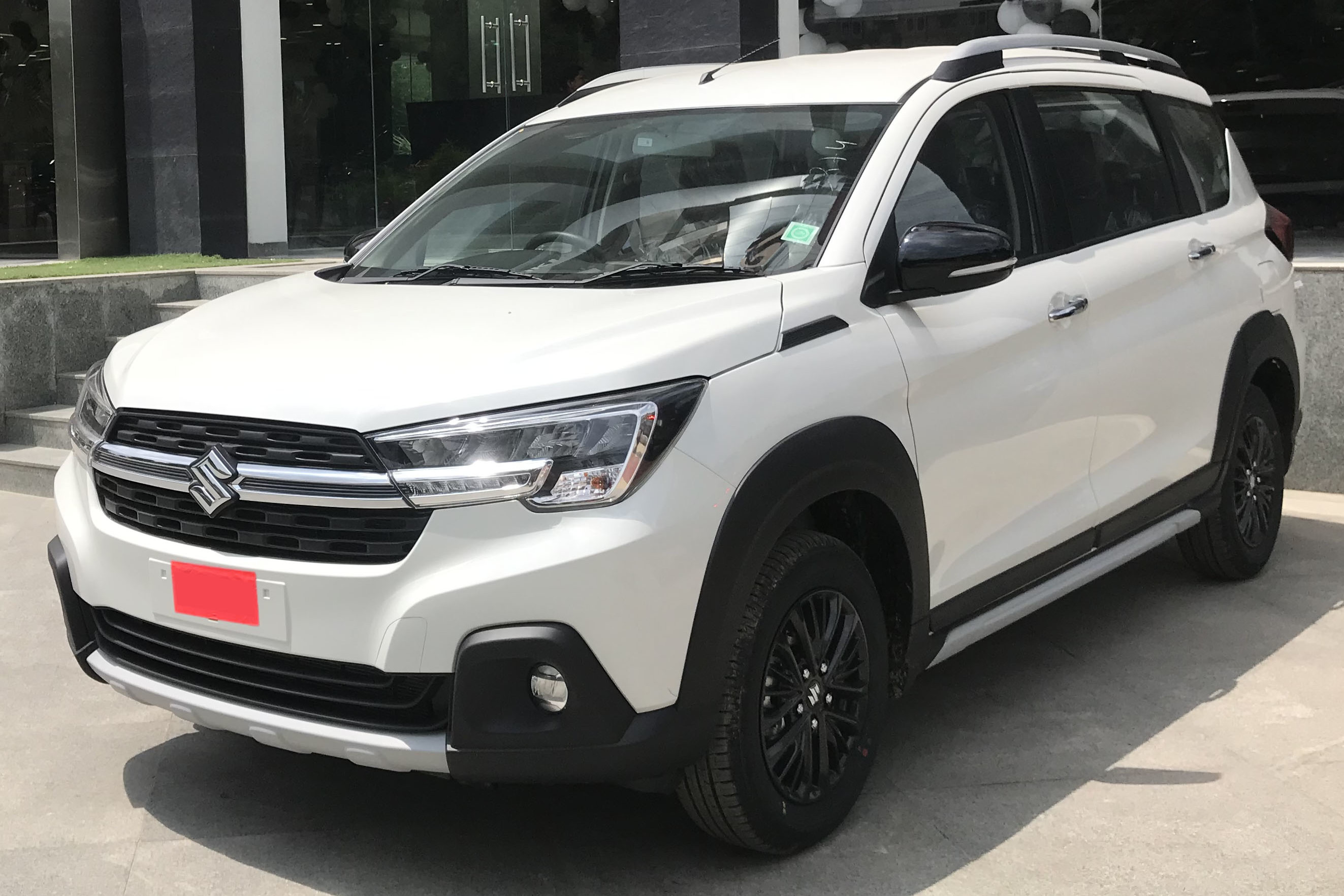
- Maruti Suzuki XL6 (India, pre-facelift)

Overview
- Model code: NC
- Also called: Suzuki Ertiga XL7 (Mexico)
- Production: August 2019 – present (XL6); January 2020 – present (XL7)
- Assembly: India: Gurgaon (Maruti Suzuki, XL6); Indonesia: Bekasi (Suzuki Indomobil Motor Cikarang plant, XL7)
- Designer: Cristiano Zanot and Izumi Beppu (exterior); Isamu Ogawa and Tatsuo Kobayashi (interior)

Body and chassis
- Platform: Heartect

Powertrain
- Engine: Petrol: 1462 cc K15B I4; MHEV: 1462 cc K15B I4 SHVS; 1462 cc K15C I4 SHVS; CNG; 1462 cc K15C I4
- Electric motor: Integrated Starter Generator (ISG)
- Power output: 76–77 kW (102–103 hp; 103–105 PS)
- Transmission: 5-speed manual; 4-speed automatic; 6-speed automatic
- Hybrid drivetrain: 12-volt mild hybrid (MHEV) Smart Hybrid Vehicle by Suzuki (SHVS)
- Battery: 6-Ah lithium-ion

Dimensions
- Wheelbase: 2,740 mm (107.9 in)
- Length: 4,445 mm (175.0 in); 4,485 mm (176.6 in) (2025 improvement)
- Width: 1,775 mm (69.9 in)
- Height: 1,755 mm (69.1 in)
- Curb weight: 1,180–1,295 kg (2,601–2,855 lb)

The Suzuki XL6 in India, Nepal, Bangladesh, Bhutan and Africa, Suzuki XL7 elsewhere and the Suzuki Ertiga XL7 in Mexico, is a crossover-inspired derivative of the second-generation Ertiga. Its development was led by chief engineer Masayuki Ishiwata. According to Suzuki, the XL6/XL7 has over 200 component differences from the regular Ertiga. Apart from the changes on the exterior, the other components were the engine control module, body control module, redesigned fuel tank shape for better centre of gravity and retuned suspensions. XL6 and XL7 stands for "Xtra Large 6-seater/7-seater".

The vehicle underwent its initial facelift in April 2022 to refresh its design, followed by a second, more comprehensive update introduced in July 2026.

==== Markets ====
===== India =====
The XL6 debuted in India on 21 August 2019 and sold at Maruti's Nexa showrooms. Referring to its name XL6 is a 6-seater with second row captain seats, unlike the international XL7 that comes as a 7-seater. The XL6 available with three trim levels: Zeta, Alpha and Alpha+; it is powered by a 1.5-litre MHEV petrol engine paired to either a 5-speed manual or a 6-speed automatic.

In April 2022, the XL6 was given a minor facelift for the Indian market. trim levels remain the same. For engines, the XL6 is switched to the latest K15C Dualjet 1.5-litre MHEV petrol engine.

===== Indonesia =====
The XL7 was launched in Indonesia on 15 February 2020, it is available in three trim levels: Zeta, Beta and Alpha, with either a 5-speed manual or a 4-speed automatic.

The facelifted XL7 was launched on 15 June 2023, with the same trim levels from the pre-facelift model. A K15B 1.5-litre petrol MHEV engine (marketed as "'Smart Hybrid"') became standard on the Beta and Alpha trim levels, while the Zeta trim still uses the K15B 1.5-litre petrol engine, all trim levels have the option between a manual or an automatic transmission. In September 2025, the Alpha Kuro variant was added to the line-up as the flagship variant, features black exterior accents.

The second facelift was unveiled in Indonesia on 1 July 2026, with the same trim levels from the 2023 facelift model. The changes focus on a redesigned front fascia. The Alpha trim received a black accent exterior which is a reference to the Alpha Kuro trim, which was discontinued before the introduction of the second facelift model. There are no changes in terms of technical aspects, either engine or transmission.

===== Mexico =====
The XL7 was launched in Mexico on 8 October 2020 as the Ertiga XL7, comes in a sole GLX trim, paired only with a 4-speed automatic. The Ertiga XL7 for the Mexican market is imported from Indonesia.

===== Philippines =====
The XL7 was launched in the Philippines on 16 March 2020 alongside the S-Presso on a virtual online event. For the Philippines, the XL7 comes in a sole GLX trim paired with to a 4-speed automatic.

The facelifted XL7 was launched in the Philippines on 18 March 2024. Like the pre-facelift model, it is offered in the same GLX trim and the K15B 1.5-litre petrol MHEV engine became standard. In September 2025, the Black Edition variant was added to the line-up, features a two-tone exterior colour theme and black exterior accents.

===== South Africa =====
The XL6 was launched in South Africa on 23 August 2023, with two trim levels available: GL and GLX; it is powered by a K15B 1.5-litre petrol engine paired to either a 5-speed manual or a 4-speed automatic.

===== Thailand =====
The XL7 was launched in Thailand on 15 July 2020, in the sole GLX trim, paired only with a 4-speed automatic.

The facelifted XL7 was launched in Thailand on 26 March 2024. It is offered in the sole unnamed variant and powered by the K15B 1.5-litre petrol MHEV engine. In February 2026, the Black Edition variant was introduced, features black exterior accents.

===== Vietnam =====
The XL7 was launched in Vietnam on 25 April 2020, with deliveries began later in May 2020. For Vietnam, the XL7 is offered solely in an unnamed trim paired only to a 4-speed automatic.

The facelifted XL7 was launched in Vietnam on 20 August 2024. It is offered in the sole unnamed variant from the pre-facelift model and powered by the K15B 1.5-litre petrol MHEV engine.

==== Gallery ====
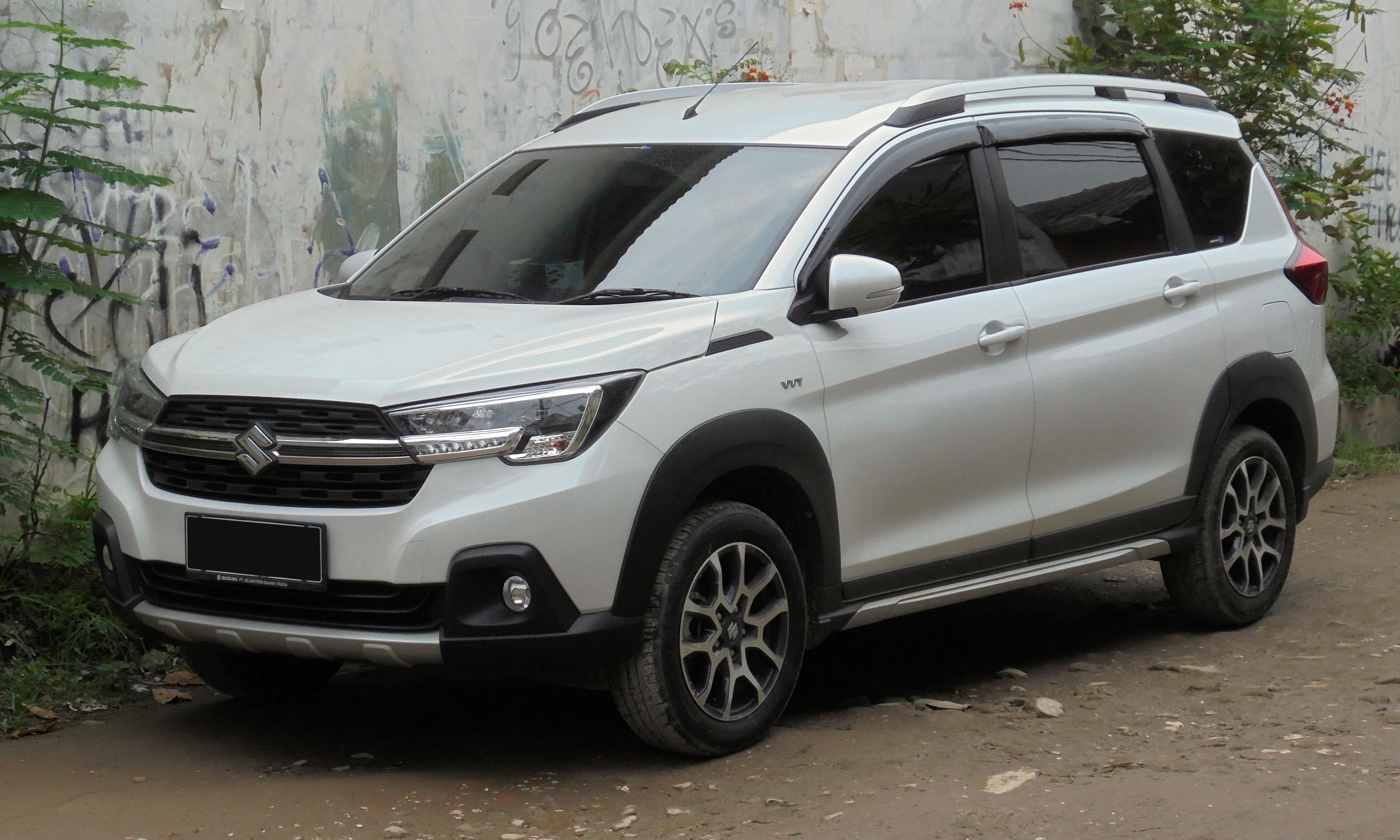
2020 XL7 Zeta (Indonesia, pre-facelift)

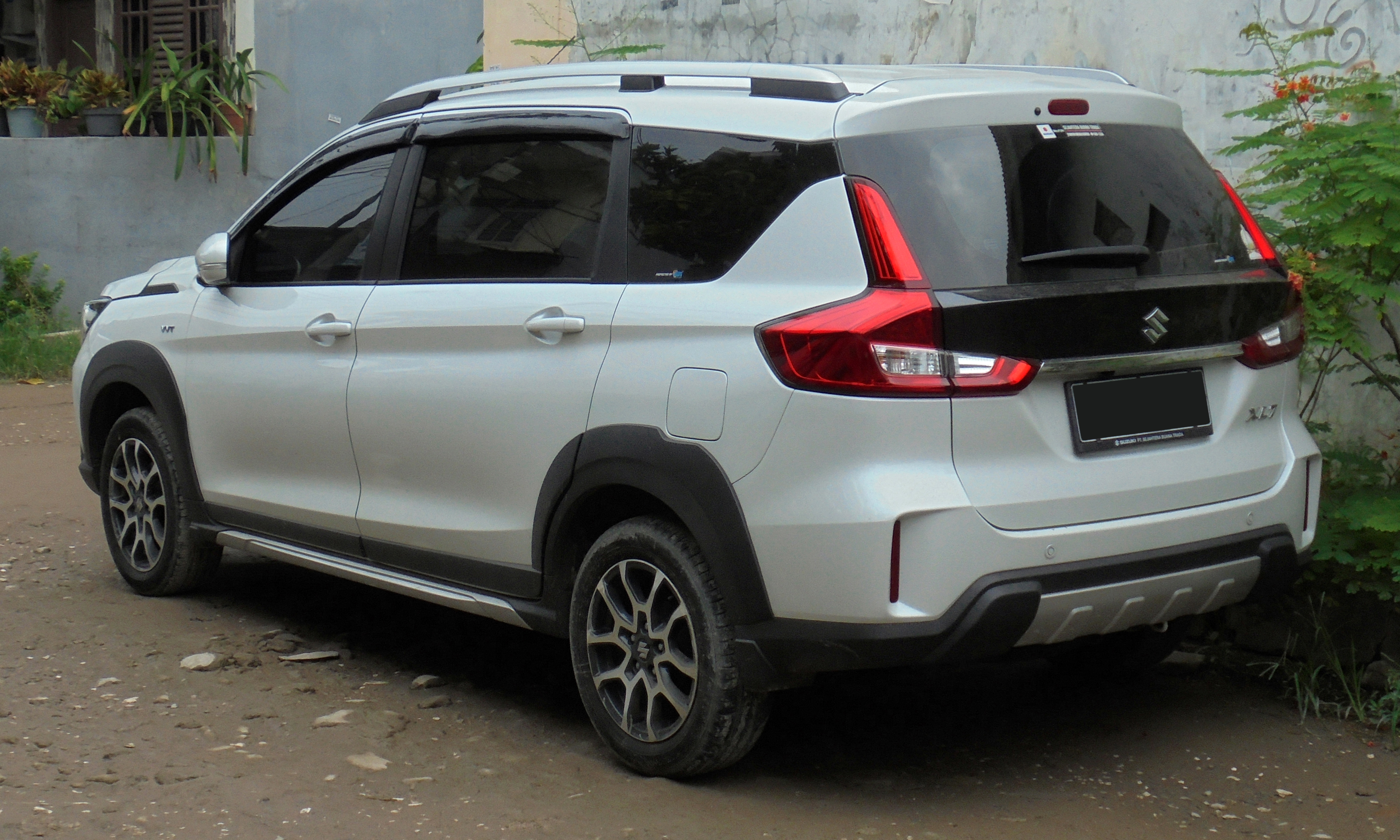
2020 XL7 Zeta (Indonesia, pre-facelift)

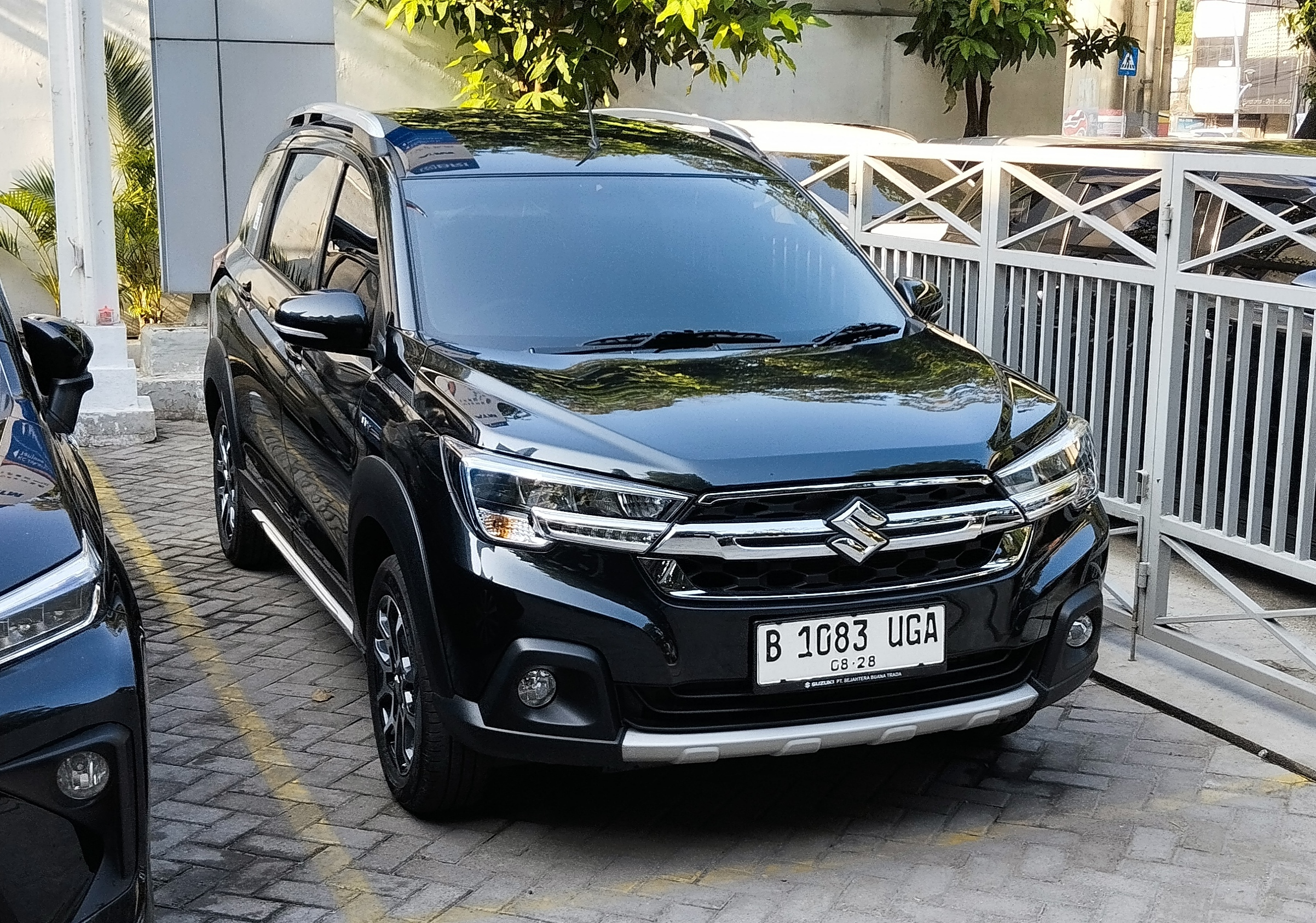
2023 XL7 Zeta (Indonesia, first facelift), adopting the facelifted XL6 styling.

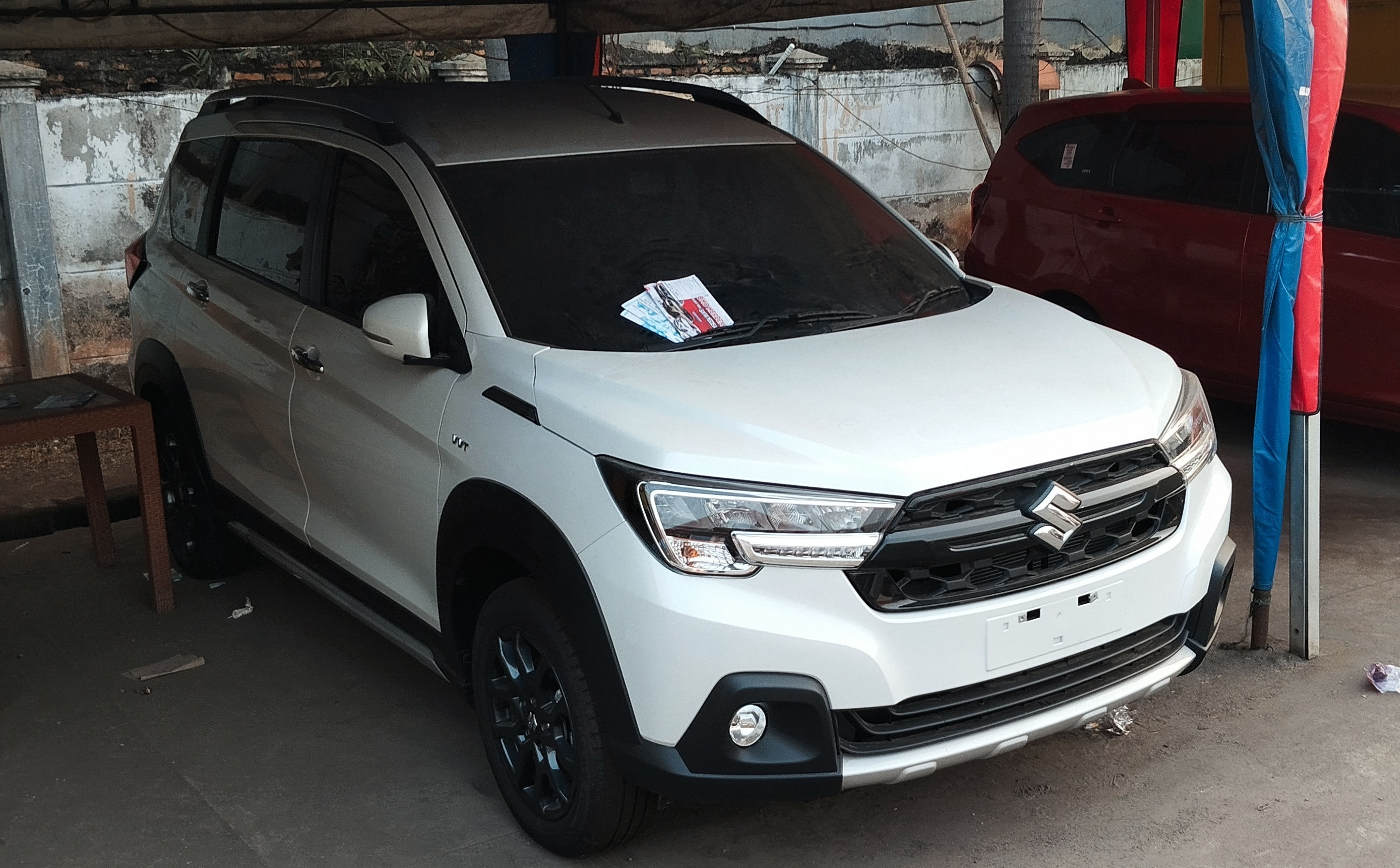
2023 XL7 Beta Hybrid (Indonesia, first facelift)

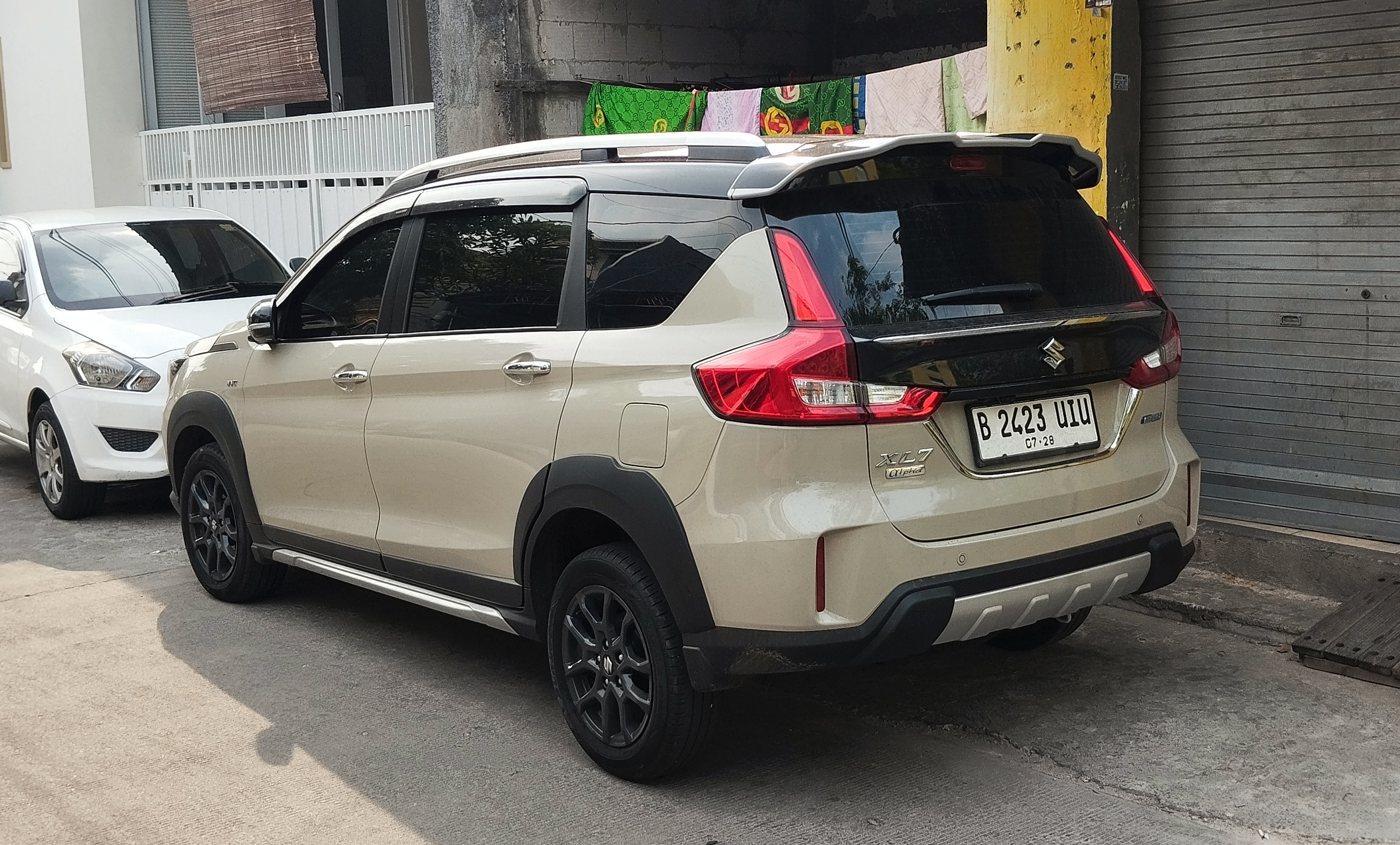
2023 XL7 Alpha Hybrid (Indonesia, first facelift)

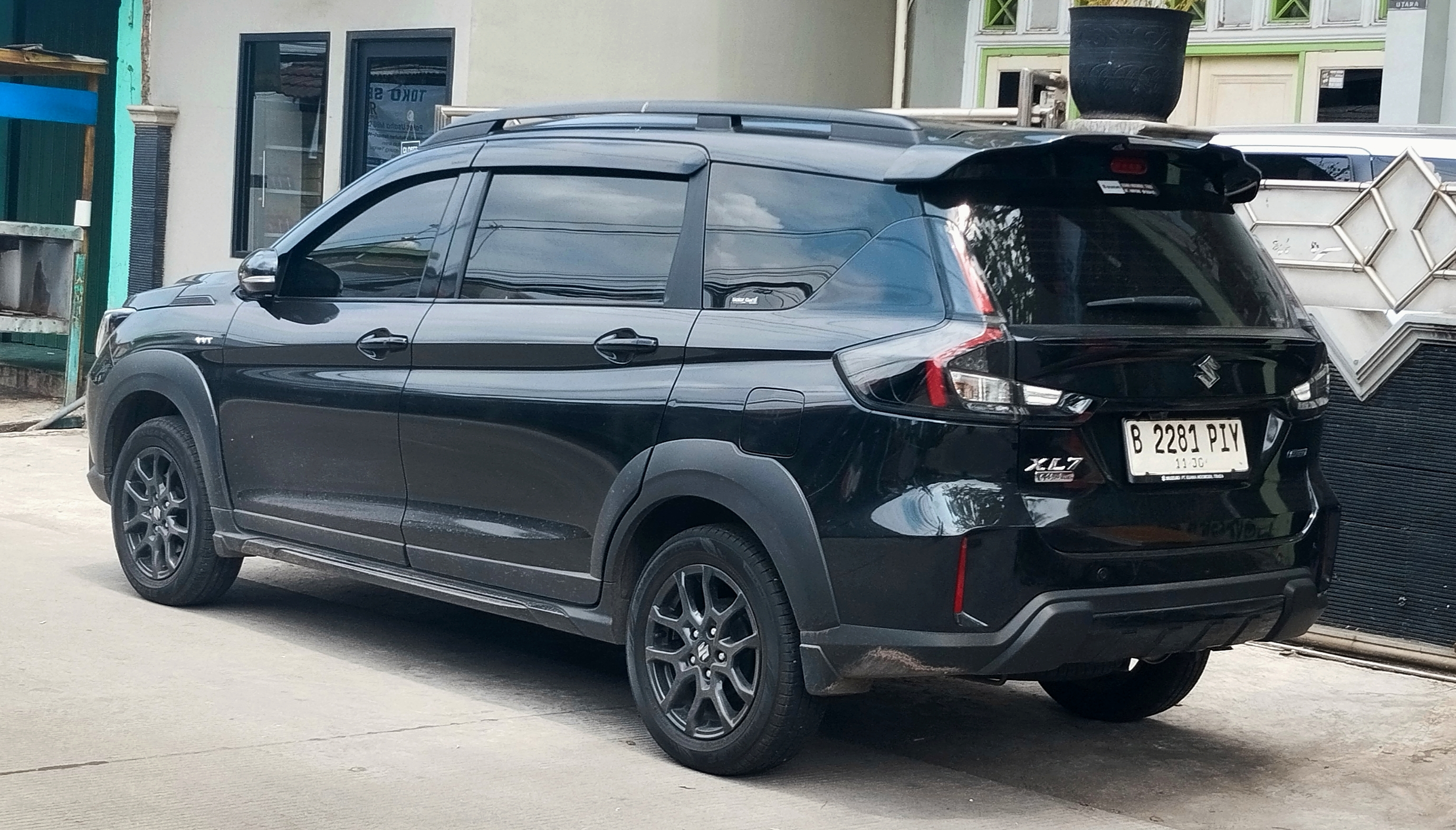
2025 XL7 Alpha Kuro Hybrid (Indonesia)

2026 XL7 Alpha Hybrid (Indonesia, second facelift)

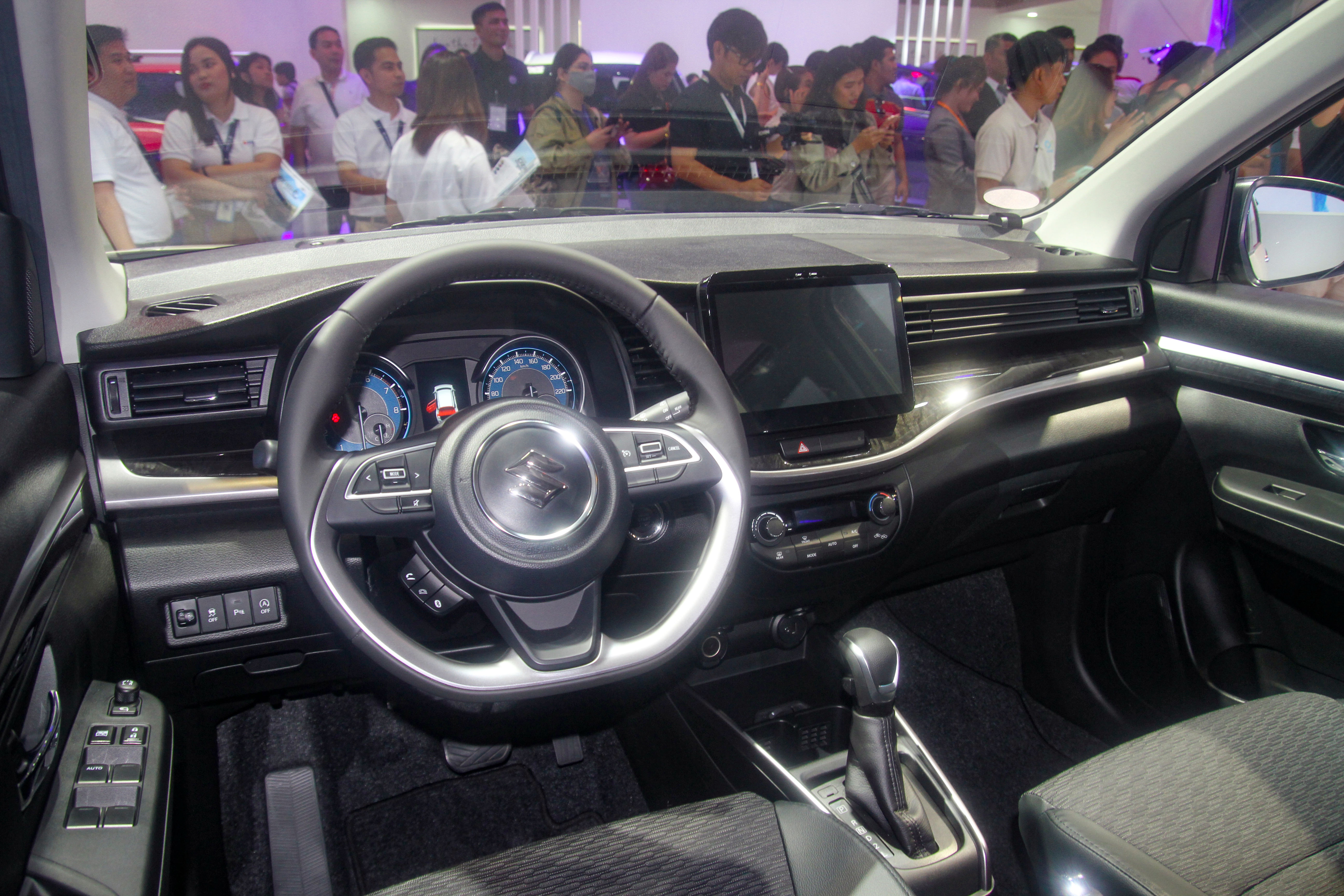
Interior

== Powertrains ==
Petrol engines
| Chassis code | Model | Engine | Transmission | Power | Torque |
|---|---|---|---|---|---|
| ZE81S (ZG81S for Mazda VX-1) | 1.4 | 1,373 cc K14B DOHC 16-valve EFI straight-four with VVT | 5-speed manual 4-speed automatic | 70 kW (94 hp; 95 PS) at 6,000 rpm | 130 N⋅m (96 lb⋅ft; 13 kg⋅m) at 4,000 rpm |
| NC22S | 1.5 | 1,462 cc K15B DOHC 16-valve EFI straight-four with VVT | 5-speed manual 4-speed automatic | 77 kW (103 hp; 105 PS) at 6,000 rpm | 138 N⋅m (102 lb⋅ft; 14.1 kg⋅m) at 4,400 rpm |
| NC32S | 1.5 | 1,462 cc K15B DOHC 16-valve EFI straight-four with VVT + ISG | 5-speed manual 4-speed automatic | 77 kW (103 hp; 105 PS) at 6,000 rpm + 1.8 kW (2.4 hp; 2.4 PS) at <1,000 rpm | 138 N⋅m (102 lb⋅ft; 14.1 kg⋅m) at 4,400 rpm + 50 N⋅m (37 lb⋅ft; 5.1 kg⋅m) at <1,000 rpm |
| NC72S | 1.5 | 1,462 cc K15C DOHC 16-valve EFI straight-four with Dualjet and Dual VVT + ISG | 5-speed manual 6-speed automatic | 76 kW (102 hp; 103 PS) at 6,000 rpm + 1.8 kW (2.4 hp; 2.4 PS) at <1,000 rpm | 137 N⋅m (101 lb⋅ft; 14.0 kg⋅m) at 4,400 rpm + 50 N⋅m (37 lb⋅ft; 5.1 kg⋅m) at <1,000 rpm |
Diesel engines
| Chassis code | Model | Engine | Transmission | Power | Torque |
| LEB1S | 1.3 | 1,248 cc D13A DDiS DOHC 16-valve straight-four with turbocharger | 5-speed manual | 68 kW (91 hp; 92 PS) at 4,000 rpm | 200 N⋅m (150 lb⋅ft; 20 kg⋅m) at 1,750 rpm |
| ZEK1S; NC42S | 1.3 | 1,248 cc D13A DDiS DOHC 16-valve straight-four with turbocharger + ISG | 5-speed manual | 68 kW (91 hp; 92 PS) at 4,000 rpm + 1.7 kW (2.3 hp; 2.3 PS) at <1,000 rpm | 200 N⋅m (150 lb⋅ft; 20 kg⋅m) at 1,750 rpm + 60 N⋅m (44 lb⋅ft; 6.1 kg⋅m) at <1,000 rpm |
| NC52S | 1.5 | 1,498 cc E15A DDiS DOHC 16-valve straight-four with turbocharger | 6-speed manual | 70 kW (94 hp; 95 PS) at 4,000 rpm | 225 N⋅m (166 lb⋅ft; 22.9 kg⋅m) at 1,500–2,500 rpm |
CNG engines
| Chassis code | Model | Engine | Transmission | Power | Torque |
| LMG1S | 1.4 | 1,373 cc K14B DOHC 16-valve EFI straight-four with VVT | 5-speed manual | 61 kW (82 hp; 83 PS) at 6,000 rpm | 110 N⋅m (81 lb⋅ft; 11 kg⋅m) at 4,000 rpm |
| | 1.5 | 1,462 cc K15B DOHC 16-valve EFI straight-four with VVT | 5-speed manual | 68 kW (91 hp; 92 PS) at 6,000 rpm | 122 N⋅m (90 lb⋅ft; 12.4 kg⋅m) at 4,400 rpm |
| NC62S | 1.5 | 1,462 cc K15C DOHC 16-valve EFI straight-four with Dualjet and Dual VVT | 5-speed manual | 64.6 kW (87 hp; 88 PS) at 5,500 rpm | 121.5 N⋅m (89.6 lb⋅ft; 12.39 kg⋅m) at 4,200 rpm |

== Sales ==
=== Ertiga ===
| Year | India | Indonesia | Mexico | Philippines | South Africa | Thailand | Vietnam |
|---|---|---|---|---|---|---|---|
| 2012 | 57,825 | 34,074 | | | | | |
| 2013 | 62,219 | 63,318 | | | | | |
| 2014 | 61,153 | 47,015 | | | | 1,538 | |
| 2015 | 60,194 | 30,963 | | | | 966 | |
| 2016 | 63,850 | 32,119 | | | | 900 | |
| 2017 | 68,354 | 35,338 | | | | 774 | 450 |
| 2018 | 56,408 | 32,592 | | | | 497 | 27 |
| 2019 | 95,901 | 24,549 | 6,246 | | | 3,599 | 2,297 |
| 2020 | 80,677 | 7,516 | 5,781 | 3,750 | | 3,232 | |
| 2021 | 114,408 | 11,410 | 7,487 | 3,054 | 2,279 | 1,003 | 1,198 |
| 2022 | 133,454 | 11,169 | 7,152 | | 2,815 | 582 | 879 |
| 2023 | 129,968 | 9,238 | 8,162 | | 5,150 | 388 | 1,101 |
| 2024 | 190,091 | 6,591 | 6,108 | | 7,198 | 110 | 1,200 |
| 2025 | | 1,895 | | | | | |

=== XL6/XL7 ===
| Year | India | Indonesia | Philippines | Vietnam | Thailand |
|---|---|---|---|---|---|
| 2019 | 15,240 | | | | |
| 2020 | 23,508 | 9,827 | 903 | 4,433 | 1,098 |
| 2021 | 33,902 | 16,090 | 1,225 | 5,175 | 3,485 |
| 2022 | 38,368 | 15,998 | | 6,526 | 1,925 |
| 2023 | 38,826 | 15,183 | | 2,526 | 769 |
| 2024 | 40,686 | 15,388 | | 3,154 | 404 |
| 2025 | | 13,387 | | | |

=== Proton Ertiga ===
| Year | Malaysia (Note: Figures based on registration (Malaysia)) |
|---|---|
| 2016 | 335 |
| 2017 | 6,091 |
| 2018 | 5,051 |
| 2019 | 272 |
| 2020 | 0 |
