= Maruti 800 =

Maruti Suzuki 800
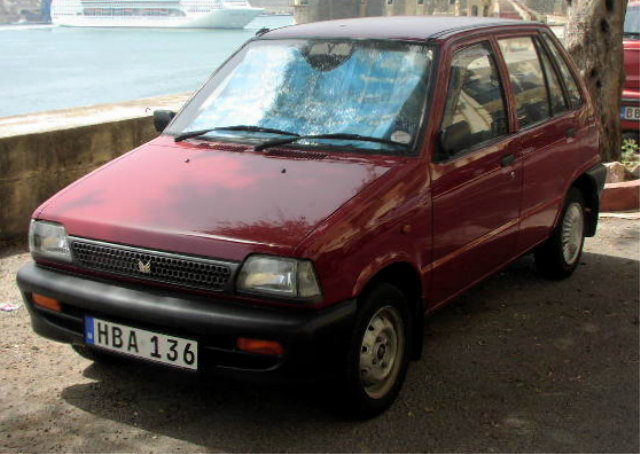
- Maruti Suzuki 800, the model after the 2003 upgrade

Overview
- Manufacturer: Maruti Suzuki
- Also called: Suzuki Alto; Suzuki Fronte; Suzuki Mehran (Pakistan); Suzuki Maruti (Export); Suzuki Alto Spirit (Europe)
- Production: 1983–2014
- Assembly: India: Haryana, Gurgaon

Body and chassis
- Class: City car
- Body style: 5-door hatchback
- Layout: Front-engine, front-wheel-drive
- Related: Suzuki Fronte

Powertrain
- Engine: Gasoline: 796 cc F8B I3 (1983-2014); 796 cc F8D I3 (2000-2003)
- Transmission: 4-Speed Manual; 3-Speed Automatic; 5-Speed Manual

Dimensions
- Wheelbase: 2,175 mm (85.6 in)
- Length: 3,335 mm (131.3 in)
- Width: 1,440 mm (56.7 in)
- Height: 1,405 mm (55.3 in)
- Curb weight: 620–655 kg (1,367–1,444 lb)

Chronology
- Successor: Maruti Suzuki Alto 800

The Maruti Suzuki 800 is a city car that was manufactured by Maruti Suzuki in India from 1983 to 2014. The first generation (SS80) was based on the 1979 Suzuki Alto and had an 800 cc F8B engine, hence the moniker. The second generation (SB308) was based on the 1984 Suzuki Alto, which utilised the same F8B engine. Widely regarded as the most influential automobile in India, about 2.87 million 800s were produced during its course, of which 2.66 million were sold in India itself.

Produced for 31 years, the Maruti Suzuki 800 remains the second longest production car in India, second only to the Hindustan Ambassador.

== Origins ==
Sanjay Gandhi tried his hand at the car business unsuccessfully before his death in 1980. His mother, Indira Gandhi, wanted to fulfill Sanjay's dream of an indigenous people's car and formed Maruti Udyog Ltd a year later. A joint venture agreement was signed with Suzuki on 2 October 1982.

== History ==
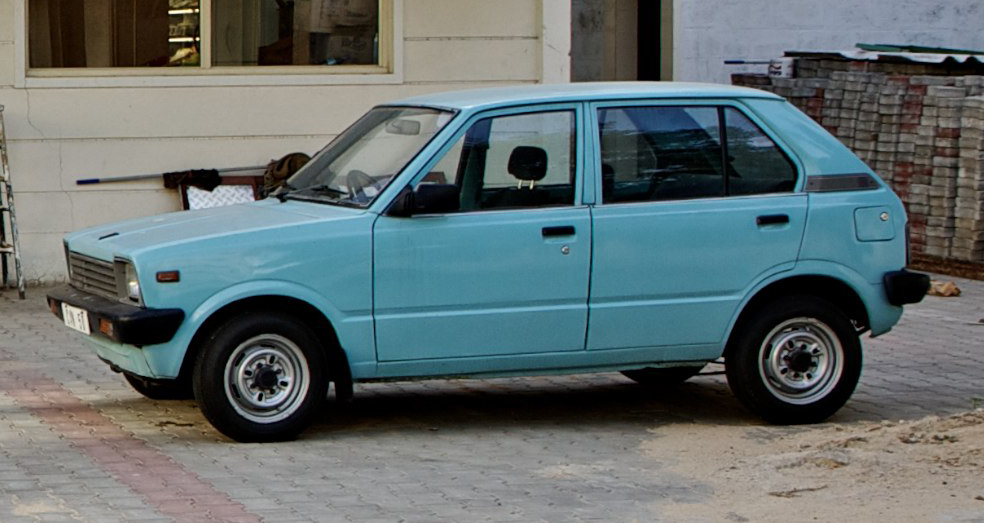
First generation Maruti Suzuki 800 DX

In the 1980s and early 1990s, the name "Maruti" was synonymous with the Maruti Suzuki 800. It remained the best-selling car in India until 2004, when the Maruti Suzuki Alto took the title. It was also exported to a number of countries in South Asia including Nepal, Bangladesh and Sri Lanka and was also available in Morocco and selected European markets, often sold as the Suzuki Maruti. In an elaborate ceremony held in New Delhi on 14 December 1983, then Prime Minister Indira Gandhi handed over the keys of the very first car to Harpal Singh (S/O Haridas Singh), who won the ownership rights through a lucky draw. The original 800 was based on the Suzuki Alto SS80, but a modernized aerodynamic version using the body of the second-generation Alto (SB308) was presented in late 1986. The introduction of this car revolutionized the automotive industry in India. From its inception, it was considered as the first affordable people's car, the first modern era front wheel drive and high speed small contemporary vehicle, and the only reasonably modern car available in India, the incumbent mainstay Hindustan Ambassador and Premier Padmini being based on long-obsolete 1950s designs. The delivery was against bookings done directly with Maruti Udyog Limited (A Govt. of India undertaking). The prospective owner would then have to wait for almost three years after booking till delivery. Such extended waiting times gave rise to some people indulging into black marketing and earning premiums as much as 40%. Cars produced during the early years were essentially Suzuki OEM components imported from Japan and merely assembled by Maruti Udyog Limited at the Gurgaon plant.

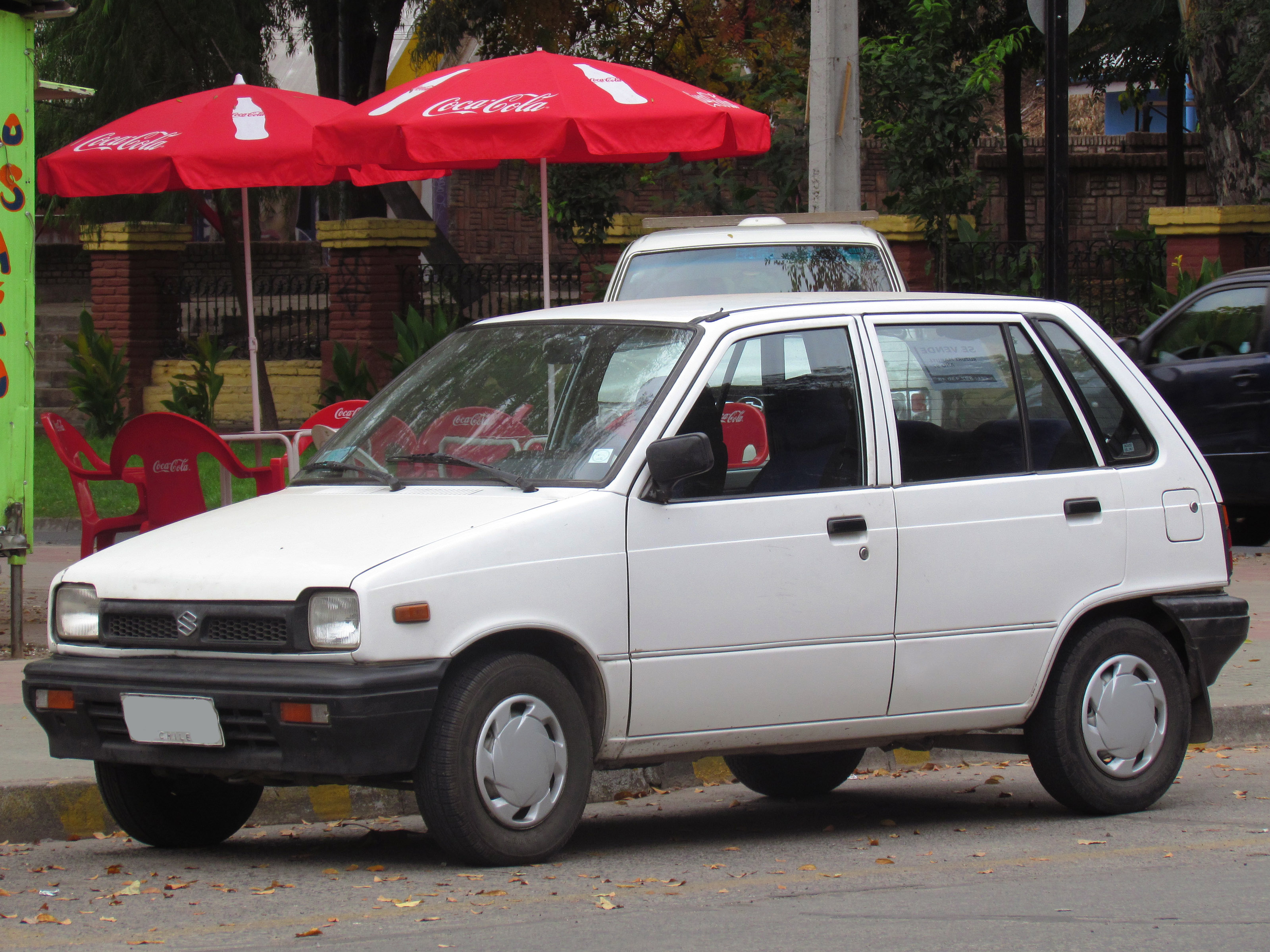
A left hand drive second gen Maruti Suzuki 800 with the 1995-1997 grille.

Exports to neighboring countries commenced in 1987, and were followed by a shipment of 500 cars to Hungary, with the first car arriving on 24 October 1987. Soon, exports to Czechoslovakia and Yugoslavia followed, two other markets with less restrictive homologation requirements than Western Europe. After successes there, and in spite of Suzuki's objections, Maruti Suzuki tackled more competitive markets and entered France in 1989, the Netherlands in 1990, followed by England, Malta, and Italy. In markets where Japanese cars had a quota, the 800 was sold as a Maruti, with all mention of Suzuki carefully removed – even the user manuals were revised, so as not to fall afoul of the quota requirements. The 800 continued to be sold in Italy and other Western European markets until 2004, when it no longer met emissions and safety requirements. The Maruti Suzuki had never been equipped with seat belts until exports began, meaning that such parts originally had to be imported from Japan to be fitted to export market cars, as with everything relating to building left-hand-drive cars. The Maruti also got its first catalytic converter to meet European requirements. The cleaner 35 PS (26 kW) version first arrived in August 1992 and was originally reserved for Europe.

Suzuki in Japan wanted to end production of the 800 and replace it with the Maruti Suzuki Zen. In 1993 Suzuki royalties for the 800 would end, meaning Maruti Suzuki had no incentive to keep making the car. In the end, a compromise was reached where Suzuki would continue to get a small royalty and they agreed to make small improvements to keep the 800 relevant in the market. The first major update was in 1997 with new headlamps, front and rear bumpers, a new dashboard and the steering wheel from the Zen. In 2000, the engine got fuel injection with 4 valves per cylinder. This gave more power (46HP/35kW) and also meant it met new Euro II emissions standards.

== Phase-out ==
Maruti Suzuki had begun a phase-out of the 800 beginning in April 2010, as they did not have plans to upgrade it to Euro IV or BS IV emission norms, instead choosing to replace it with the second generation Alto 800 in India. Starting in April 2010, Maruti halted sales of the car in 13 major cities: the four metros of Chennai, Delhi, Kolkata, Mumbai and 9 other cities including Kanpur, Bengaluru, Hyderabad, Pune, Ahmedabad, Agra and Surat, where the law made it mandatory for the vehicles sold to be Euro IV compliant.

Another reason cited was the relatively outdated model's declining sales. Maruti Suzuki 800 sales were down by 3.7% in April 2010, when compared with April 2009. Total sales of Maruti Suzuki 800 was 33028 for the period April 2009 to March 2010. The Indian Automobile industry is the seventh largest in the world, with an annual production of over 4 million vehicles and exports of about 600,000. In 2009, India emerged as Asia's fourth largest exporter of automobiles, behind Japan, South Korea and Thailand.

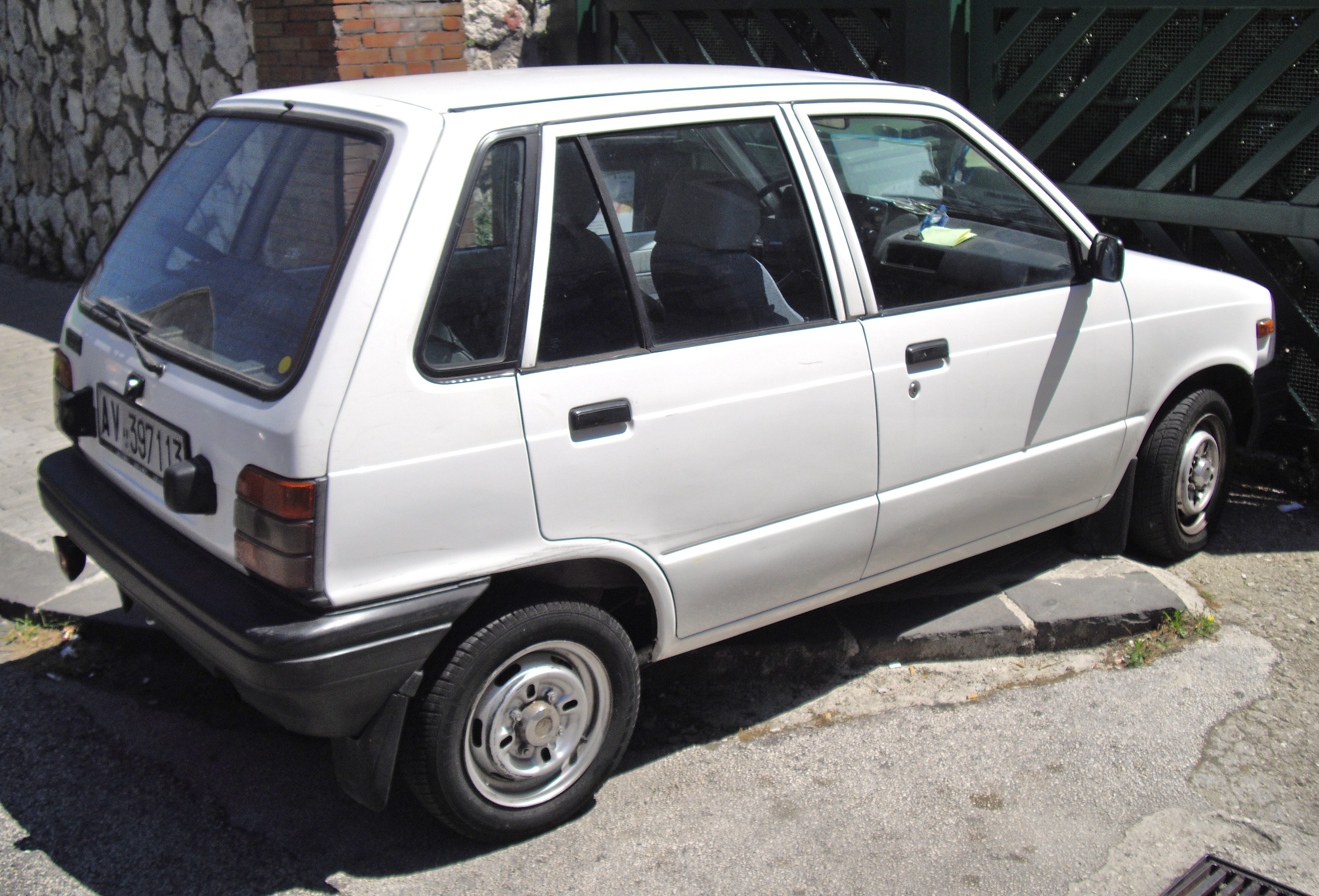
Rear view of an export spec Maruti Suzuki 800 in Italy with a rear wiper and rear foglamp.

The last Maruti Suzuki 800 rolled off the production line on 18 January 2014.

== Changes ==
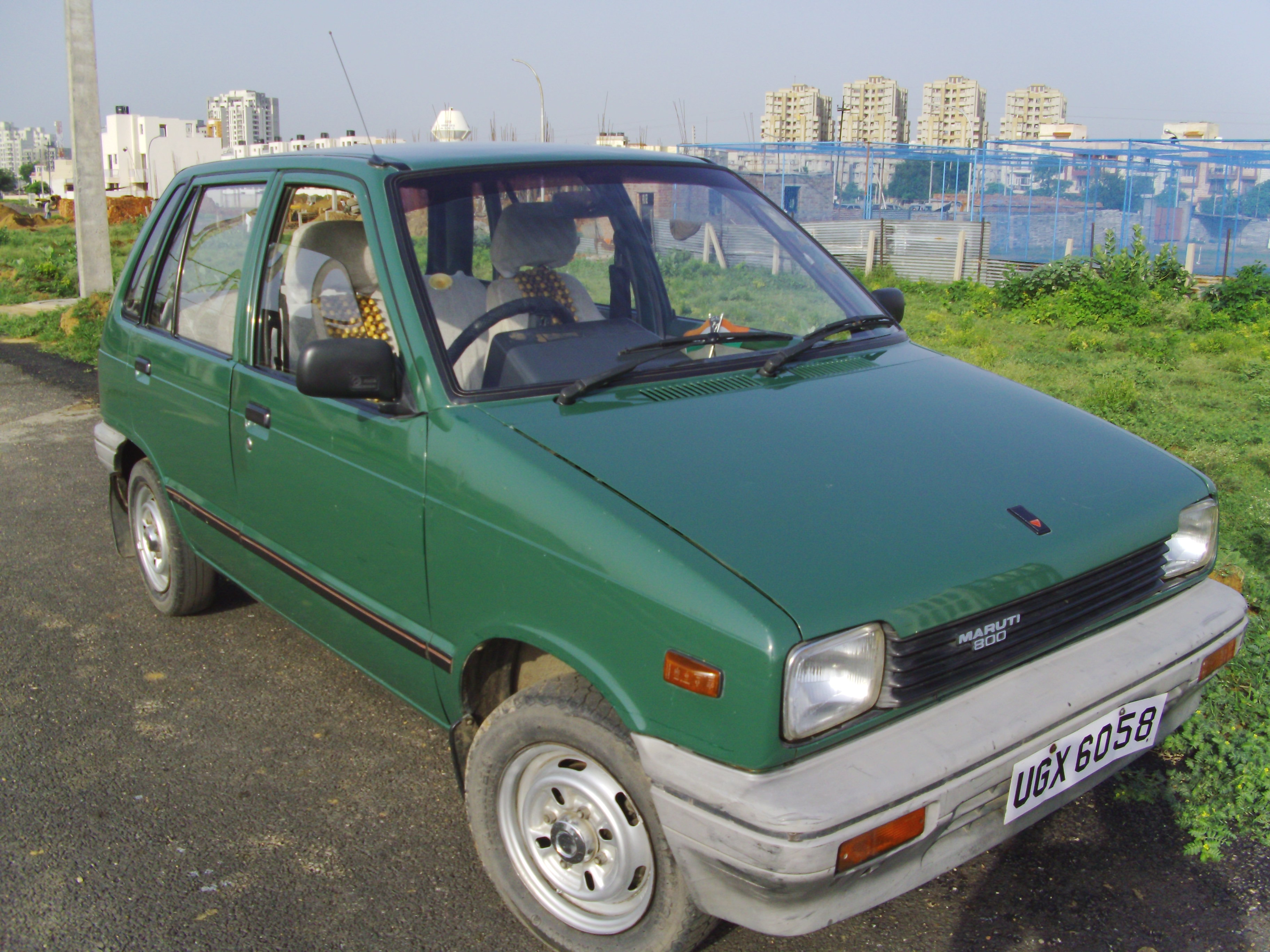
First Facelift (second gen) – A Feb 1987 model of Maruti Suzuki 800 (bottle green) in India

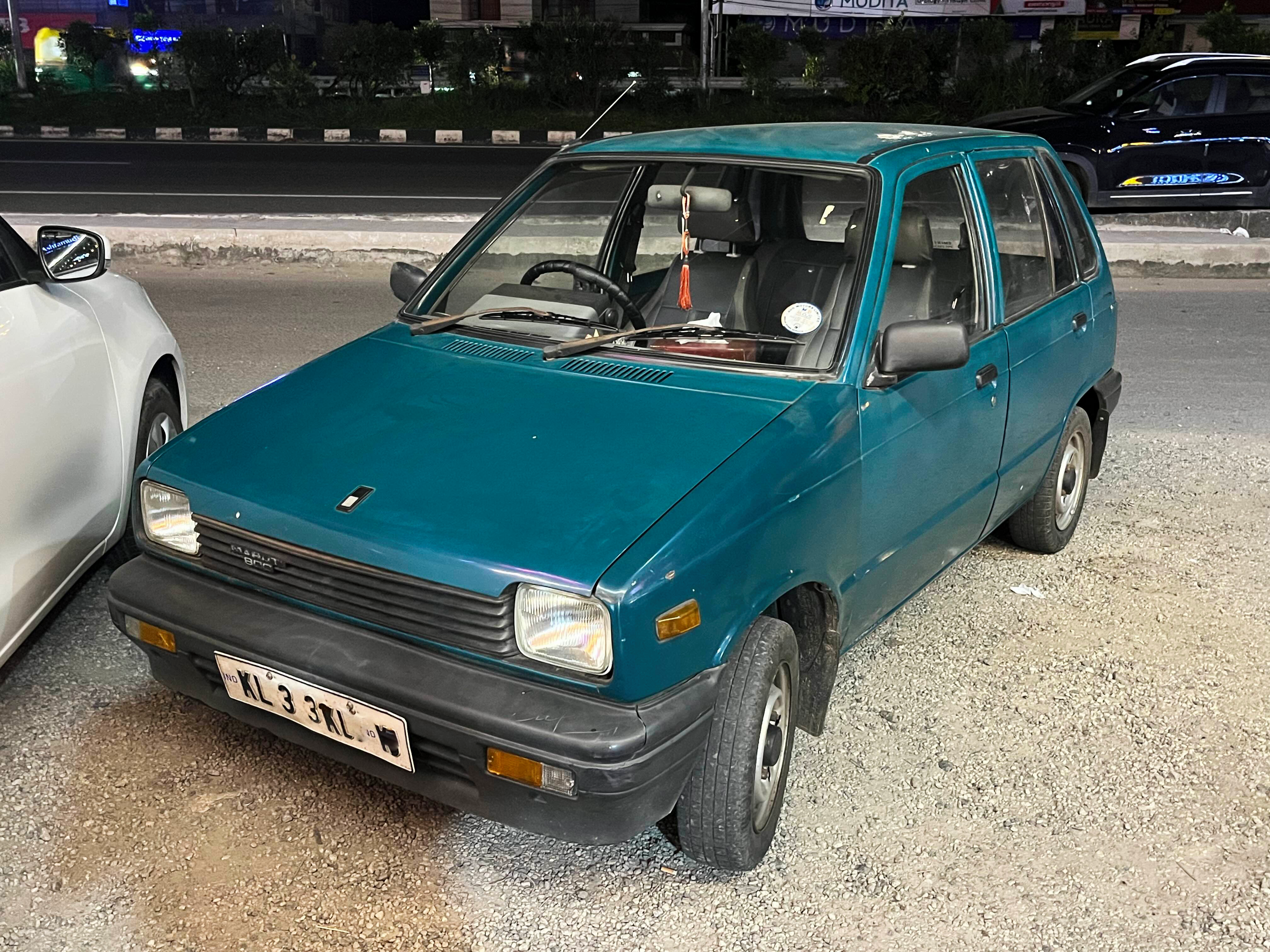
First facelift (second gen) - A 1994 Maruti 800 in Meadow Green, the final year for the horizontal slat grille.

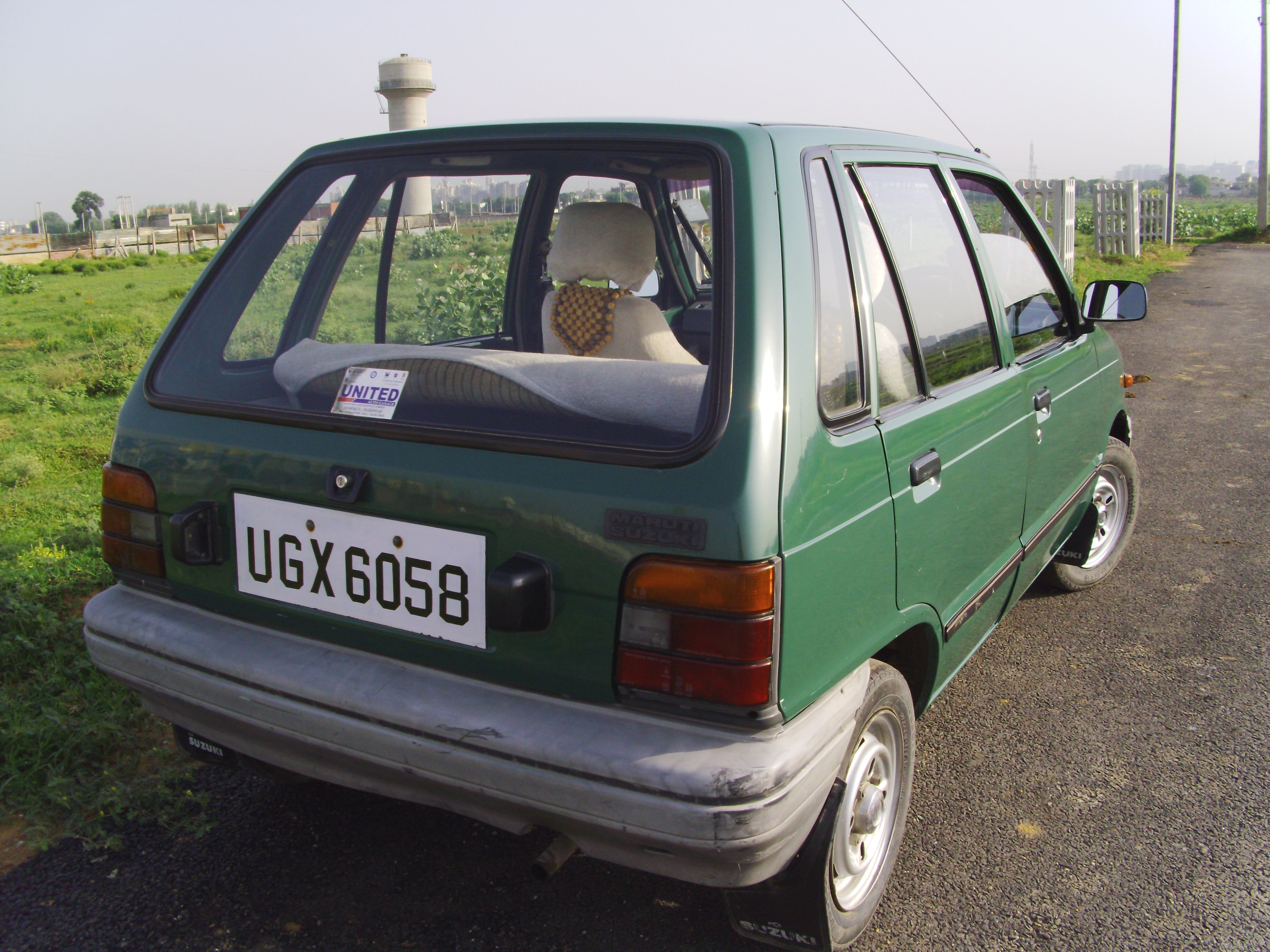
Side/rear view of Maruti Suzuki 800 SB308 (second gen) in India

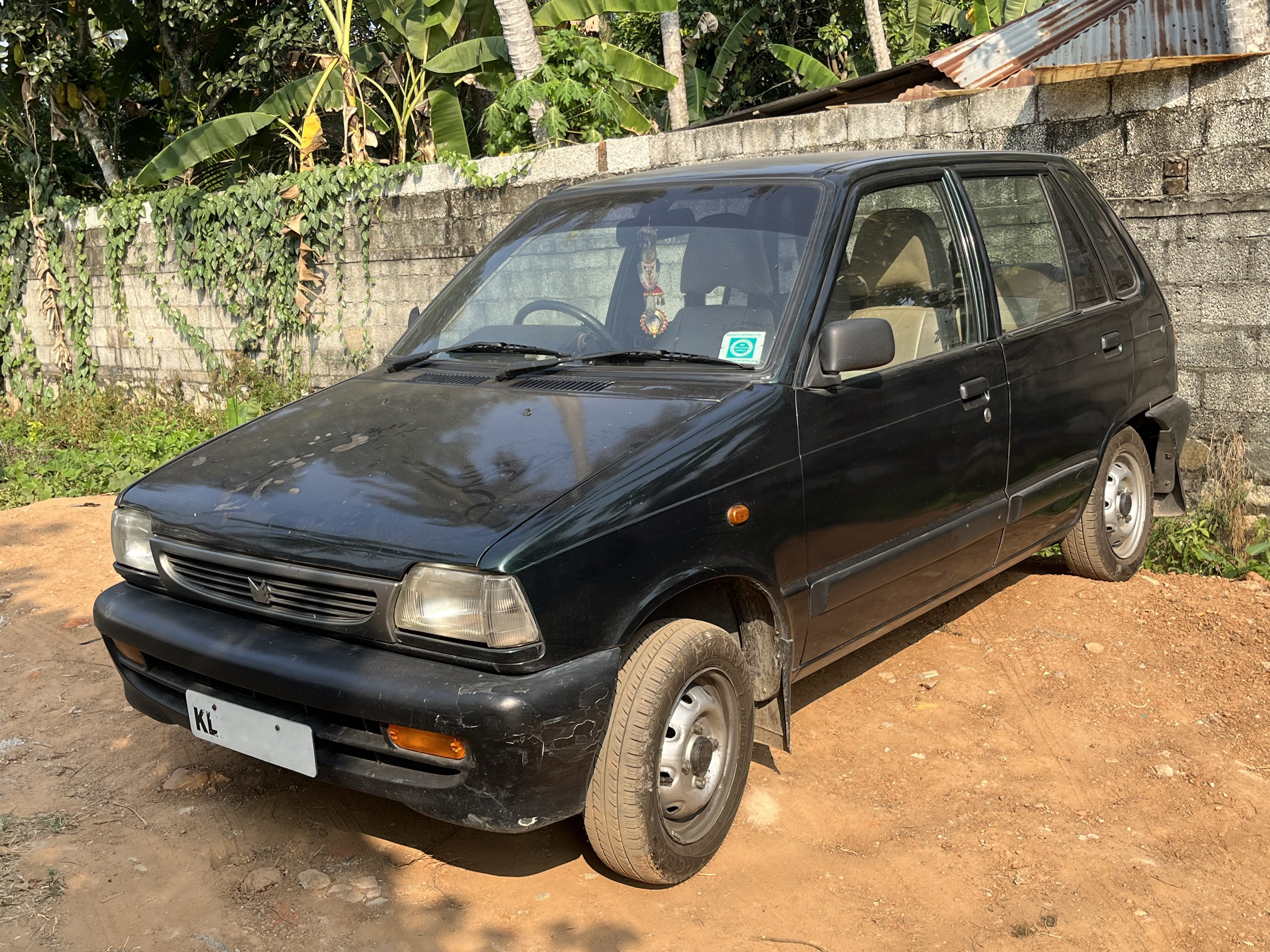
A 2000 Maruti 800 5 Speed in Metallic Exotique Green

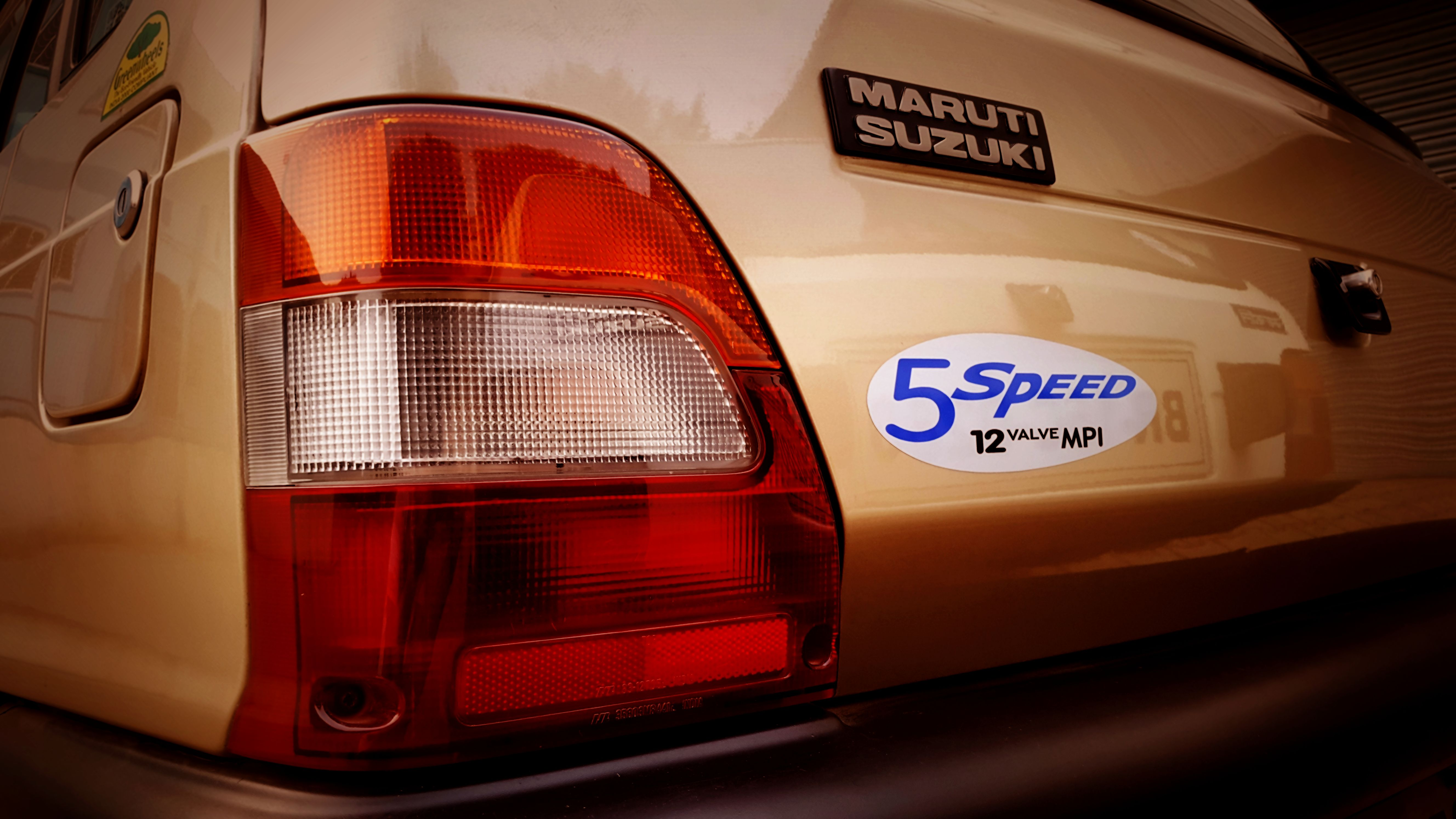
5 Speed 12 Valve MPI Decal

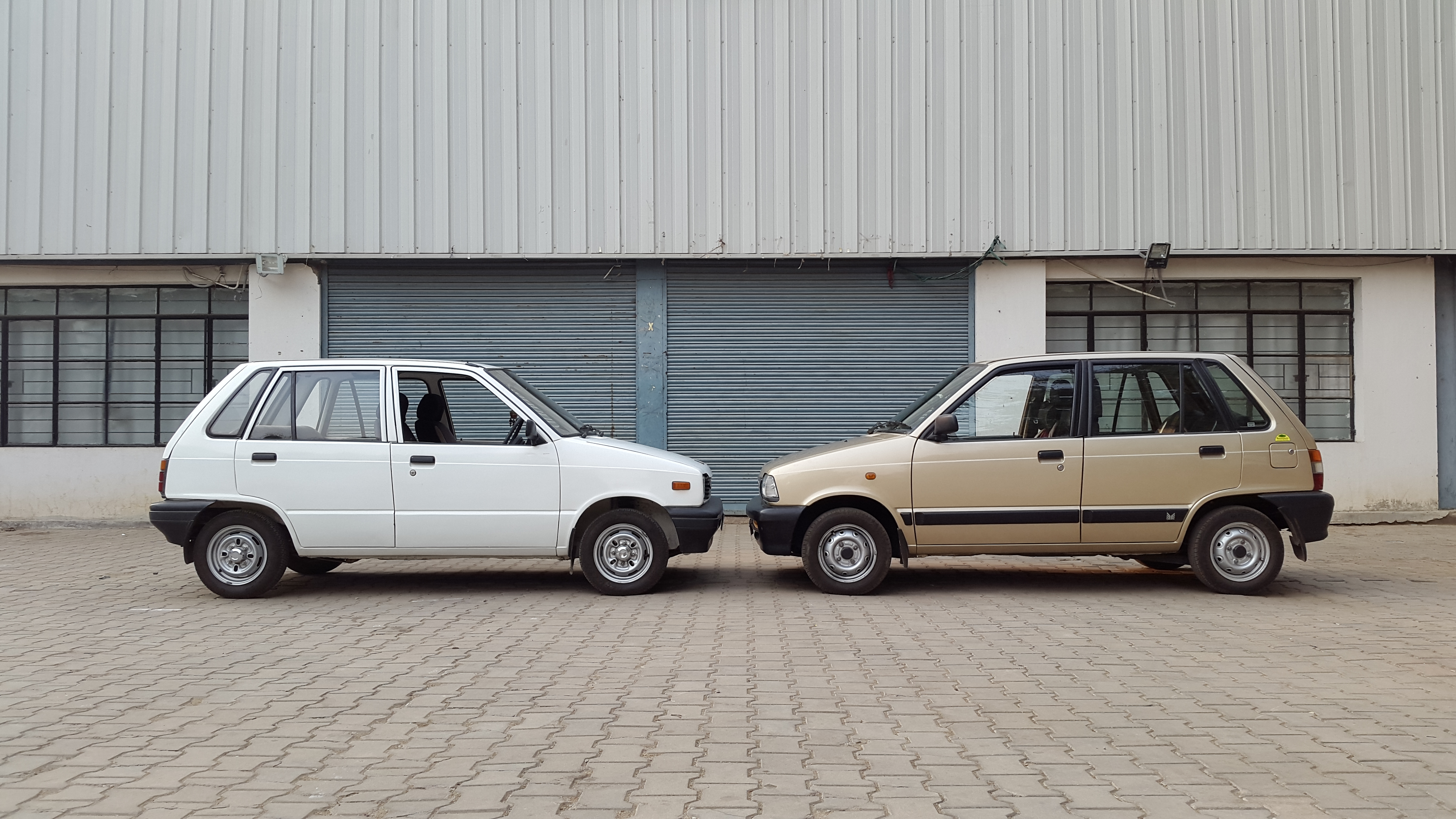
Milky White Type 1 vs California Gold Type 2

After a full model change in 1986, the 800 underwent some minor facelifts but overall it still remained similar as it was on introduction. The car produces approximately 37 brake horsepower (28 kW; 38 PS) and runs on 12-inch wheels. Kerb weight is 650 kilograms (1,433 lb) and it can seat five passengers including the driver. Maruti Suzuki had earlier launched a version with a twelve-valve version of the engine producing 45 bhp (34 kW; 46 PS) and coupled with a five-speed manual transmission (currently found in the Suzuki Alto), but discontinued it after a couple of years. The second generation Maruti Suzuki 800 that was produced from 1986 to 2014 underwent some changes in its appearance. The original grille that was introduced in 1986 was a horizontal slat grille with 'Maruti 800' monogram at the right hand corner. This grille was replaced by a mesh grille with the Maruti Logo on the centre in October 1994. Also, the bonnet opener that was placed on the bonnet was replaced by an ejection button inside of the car. The hubcaps were also changed from the shiny silver ones to plastic ones. Several new colours were also introduced, such as Maruti Green, St Germaine Red, Pearl White, and Neptune Blue.

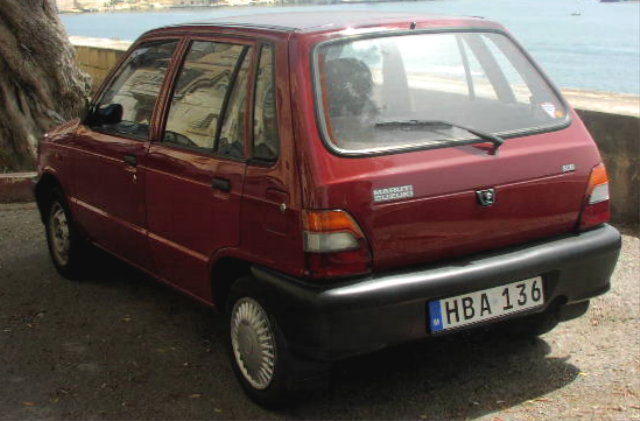
Maruti Suzuki 800 in Europe. Rear view of facelifted 800, with a reshaped trunk lid and taillights, and license plate moved down into the bumper

A Euro III emission-compliant version of the car was released in 2005 to meet Indian emissions regulations. An LPG version of the vehicle was also released in 2008. As of September 2009, the company has yet to reach a decision regarding the manufacture of a Euro IV-compliant version of the vehicle because it would increase the retail price. However even stricter emissions regulations which came into effect by April 2010, would mandate Euro IV compliance in major Indian cities including Delhi, Mumbai, Hyderabad and Bangalore and 2015–2016 for the remainder of the country. By 2005, Maruti Suzuki had planned to phase out the 800 around 2010, but it was still on sale in October 2011. Its main competitor is the less expensive Tata Nano (123,000 compared to 184,641 rupees) which has an 8 percent smaller exterior size and a noisier engine with less torque. In 2011, Maruti Suzuki declared it would relaunch the 800 with a new version compliant with Euro IV emission norms to tap into the small car market and compete with the Tata Nano. However, Maruti Suzuki later decided to phase out the model instead as it was not deemed feasible.

== Technical specifications ==
=== Dimensions and weights ===
- Front track width: 1215 mm (47.835 in)
- Rear track width: 1200 mm (47.244 in)
- Ground clearance: 160 mm (6.3 in)
- Gross vehicle weight: 1,000 kg (2,205 lb)

=== Capacities ===
- Seating capacity: 5 passengers
- Fuel tank capacity: 28 L (7.4 US gal)
- Engine oil: ~1.5L including oil filter
- Transmission oil: ~2.1L
- Coolant: 2L
- Windscreen Washer Fluid: 1.75L

=== Engine ===
The 800 is equipped with a 796 cc (49 cu in) Inline 3-cylinder 4-stroke petrol engine from the Suzuki F family. It features 2 valves per cylinder with a single overhead cam, and 8.7:1 compression ratio. The original engine option was the carbureted F8B engine, which later was offered in MPFI form. In 2000 an updated 4 valve per cylinder F8D MPFI was introduced concurrently with the 800 to comply with BSES and was able to achieve up to the BSIII standard. In late 2003, Maruti reverted back to the original F8B 2 valve per cylinder, keeping MPFI. An LPG version of the F8B was later offered as the "Maruti 800 Duo"; it complied with BSIII standards and continued to be offered until the Maruti 800 was discontinued.

	Power	Torque	Valves	Year of production
F8B Carb	39.5 horsepower (29.5 kW) @5500rpm	58 N⋅m (43 lb⋅ft) —	6	1983-2003
F8B MPFI	37 horsepower (28 kW) @5500rpm	59 N⋅m (44 lb⋅ft) @2500rpm	6	2000-2014
F8B MPFI LPG	35.5 horsepower (26.5 kW) @5000rpm	57 N⋅m (42 lb⋅ft) @2500rpm	6	2008-2014
F8D MPFI	47 horsepower (35 kW) @6200rpm	62 N⋅m (46 lb⋅ft) @3000rpm	12	2000-2003

==== Transmission ====
The original F8B engine was offered with a 4-speed manual, and later an optional 3-speed automatic. The updated F8D engine was offered exclusively with a 5-speed manual transmission borrowed from the Maruti 1000/Esteem. All models are front wheel drive.

==== Performance ====
Engine	Transmission	Top Speed	0-100 km/h
F8B Carb/MPFI	4-Speed Manual	144+ km/h (89+ mph)	12 sec
F8B Carb	3-Speed Automatic	137+ km/h (85+ mph)	20 sec
F8D MPFI	5-Speed Manual	150+ km/h (93+ mph)	14.5 sec

==== Fuel economy ====
- Mileage highway: 20 km/L (5.0 L/100 km; 47 mpg_{‑US})
- Mileage city: 16.2 km/L (6.2 L/100 km; 38 mpg_{‑US})
- Mileage overall: 20.9 km/L (4.8 L/100 km; 49 mpg_{‑US})

=== Suspension ===
- Front suspension: MacPherson strut with coil spring
- Rear suspension: Rigid Axle with Coil/Leaf spring and Gas-filled Shock Absorbers

=== Steering ===
- Steering type: Rack and pinion (Without Power Steering)
- Minimum turning radius: 4.42 m (14.5 ft)

=== Brakes ===
- Front brakes: Solid Disc
- Rear brakes: Leading Trailing Drum
- Brake mechanism: Hydraulic, power brakes in 5 speed and mpfi 4 speed

=== Wheels and tyres ===
- Tyres (radial optional): 145/70(R) 12

== See also ==
- Maruti Suzuki Alto
- Maruti Suzuki Zen
