= Suzuki S-Presso =

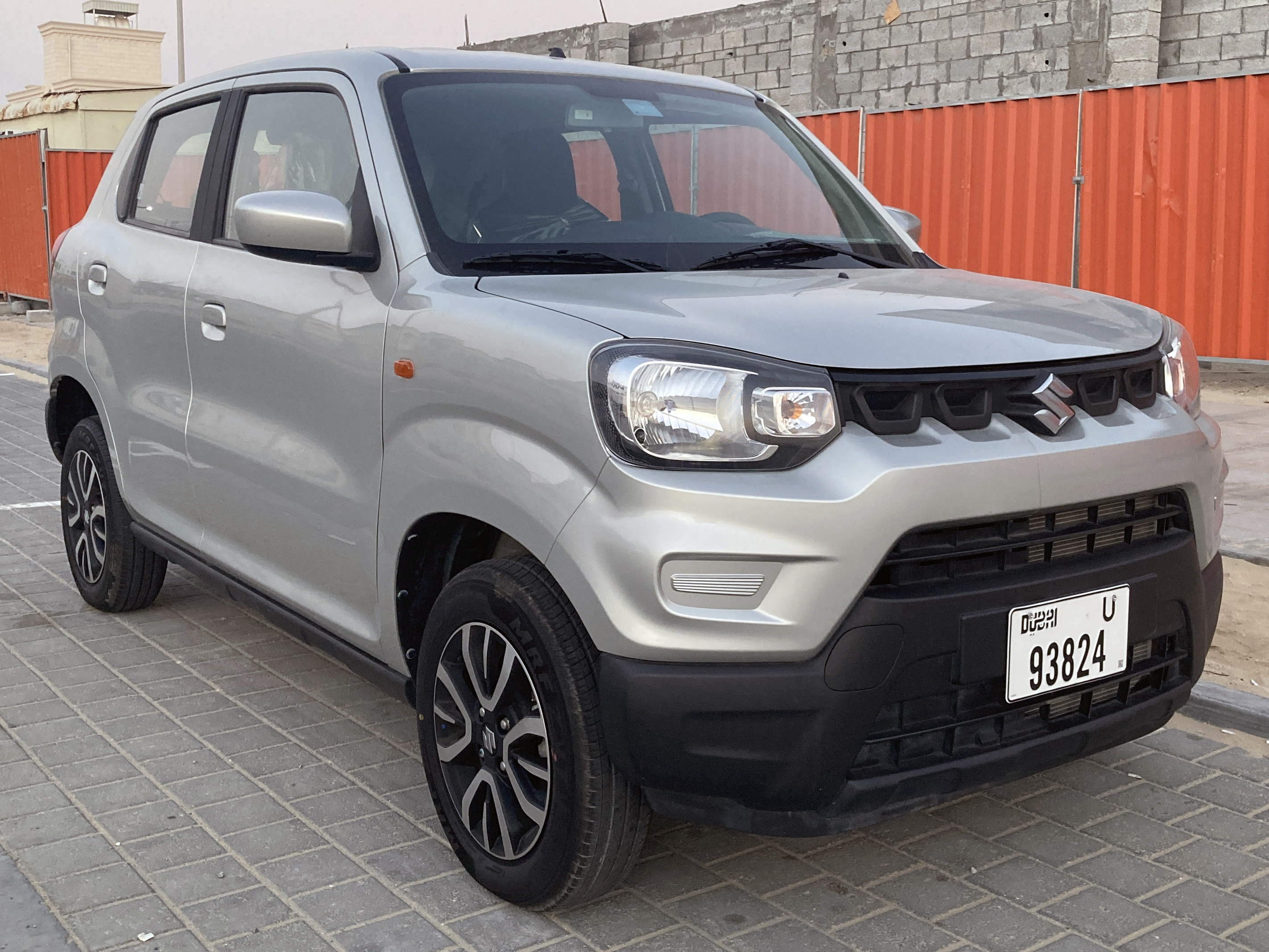
- Suzuki S-Presso (UAE)

Overview
- Manufacturer: Suzuki
- Model code: FL
- Production: September 2019 – present
- Assembly: India: Manesar, Haryana (Maruti Suzuki)

Body and chassis
- Class: City car
- Body style: 5-door hatchback
- Layout: Front-engine, front-wheel-drive
- Platform: HEARTECT
- Related: Maruti Suzuki Alto

Powertrain
- Engine: Petrol/CNG: 998 cc K10B I3; 998 cc K10C Dualjet I3
- Transmission: 5-speed manual; 5-speed AGS AMT

Dimensions
- Wheelbase: 2,380 mm (93.7 in)
- Length: 3,565 mm (140.4 in)
- Width: 1,520 mm (59.8 in)
- Height: 1,549–1,564 mm (61.0–61.6 in)
- Kerb weight: 726–775 kg (1,601–1,709 lb) (petrol); 831–854 kg (1,832–1,883 lb) (CNG)

Chronology
- Predecessor: Suzuki Karimun Wagon R (indirect, Indonesia)

The Suzuki S-Presso is a city car produced by Maruti Suzuki, Suzuki's subsidiary in India since 2019. It slots above the Alto and below the Wagon R in the Indian market. The car is marketed as a "micro SUV" or a "mini crossover" by its rugged styling and high ground clearance of 180 mm (7.1 in). The S-Presso is built on the HEARTECT platform, which is derived from Suzuki's kei cars, and uses 40% high tensile steel. It is exported to several emerging markets in Africa, South Asia, Southeast Asia, Latin America, and the Middle East.

== Markets ==
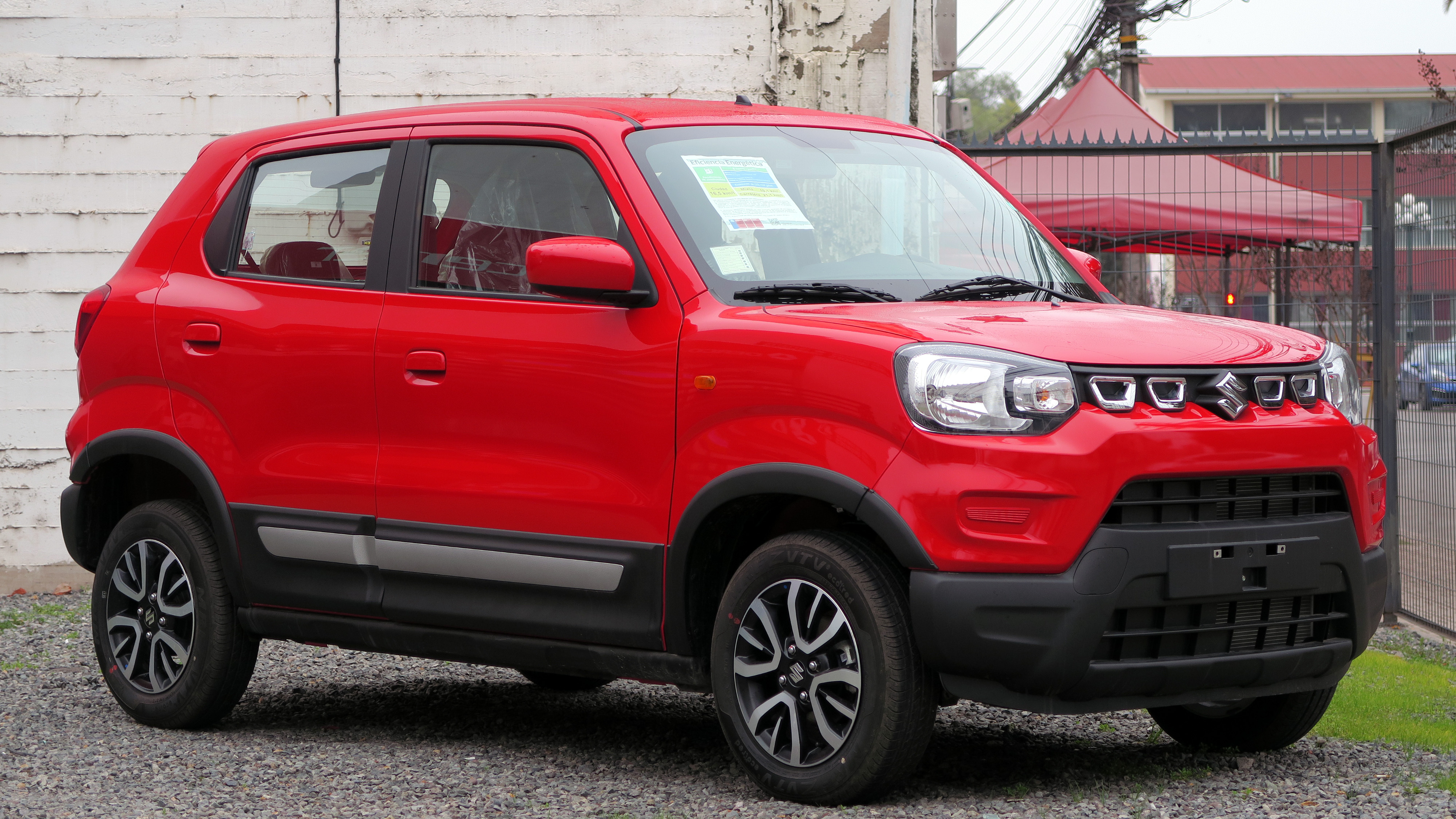
Suzuki S-Presso GLX Adventure (Chile)

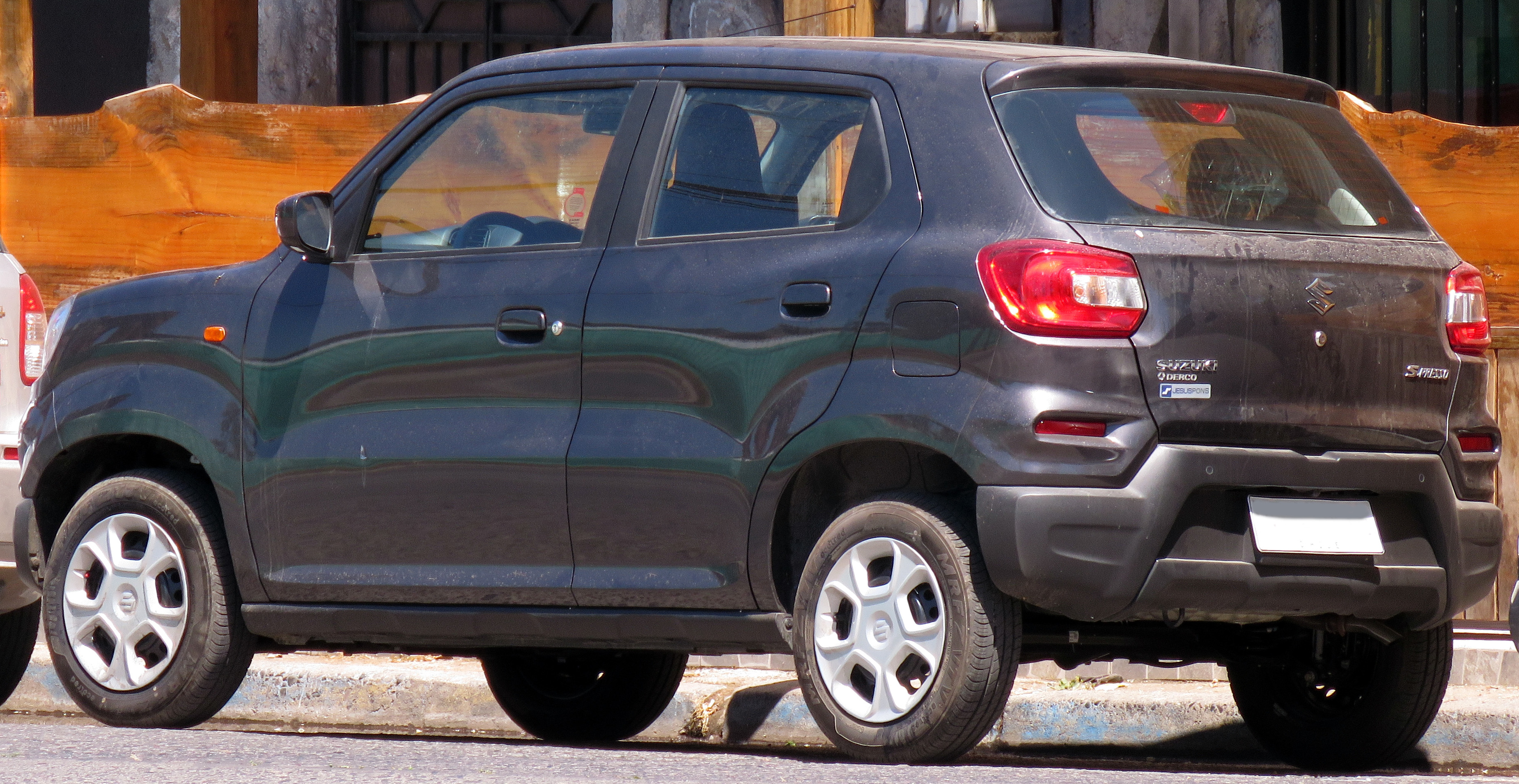
Suzuki S-Presso GLX (Chile)

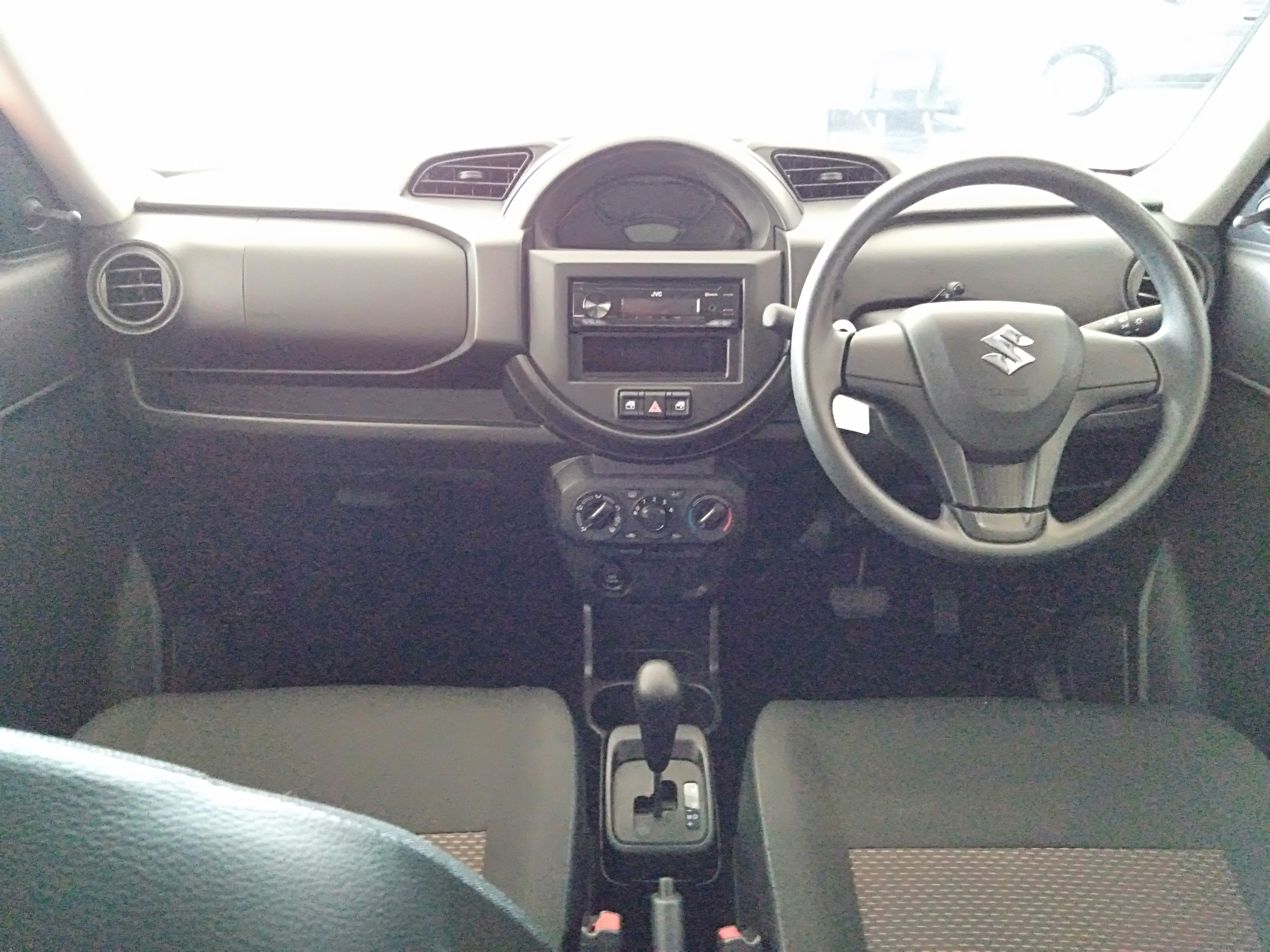
2021 Interior

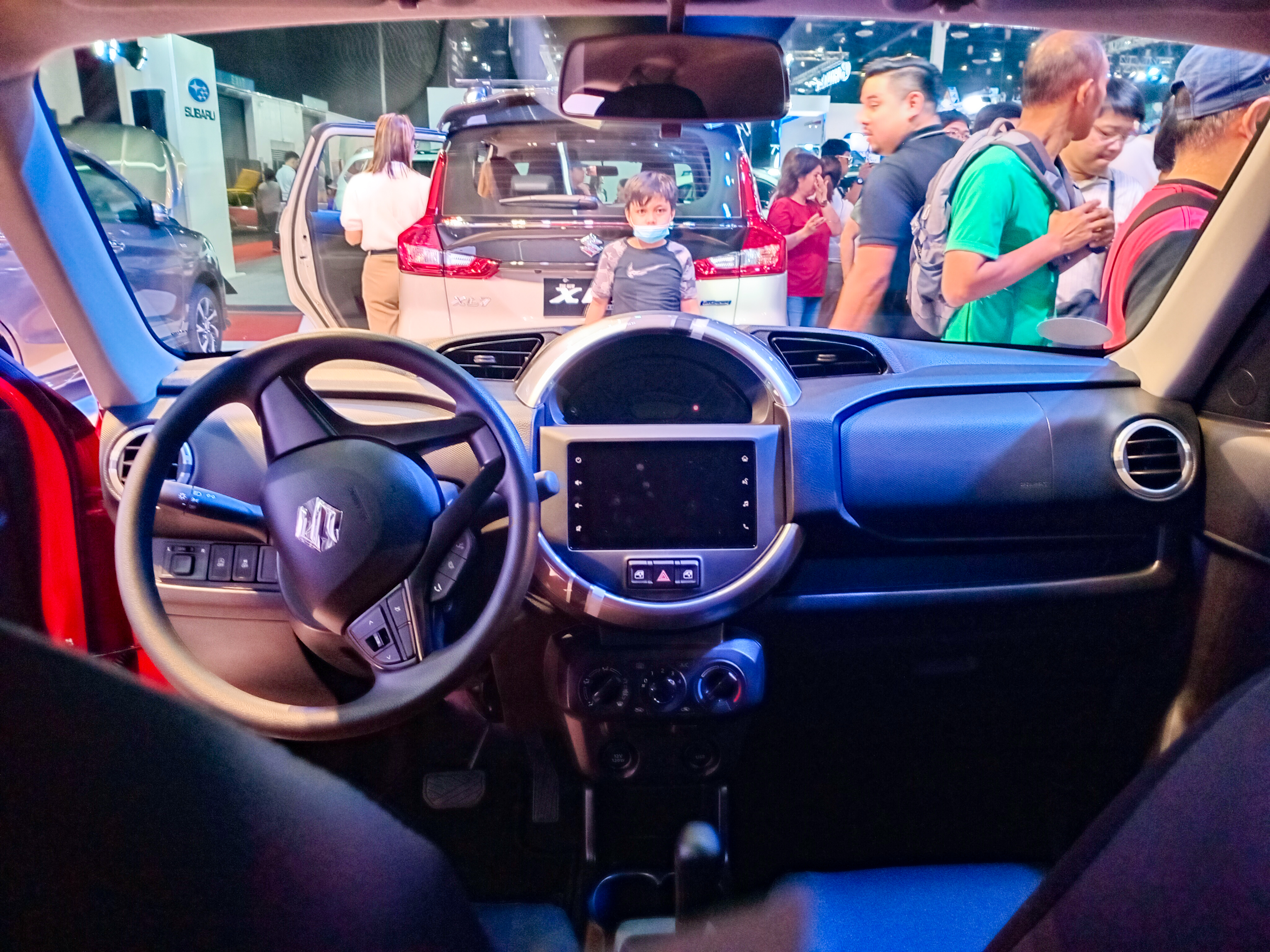
2024 Interior

=== Asia ===
==== India ====
The Maruti S-Presso concept car called "Future S concept" was unveiled at the Auto Expo 2018 in February 2018, with the production model being announced on 30 September 2019. It rivals the Renault Kwid and Datsun redi-Go in India. Four grade levels are available; Standard, LXi, VXi and VXi+.

CNG variant was announced in June 2020 which was only available for the LXi and VXi grades. AGS automated manual transmission is not available as a transmission option.

In July 2022, the updated S-Presso was introduced with new dual VVT with dual injector "K10C Dualjet" engine which is 14–17% more efficient (depending on the transmission option) than the older engine, ESP with hill-hold assist for AGS models, electrically adjustable side mirror for Vxi+ and Vxi+(O) grades and additional cabin air filter for cleaner air in the cabin. Dual airbags and front seat belts with pretensioner and force limiter also became standard across the range. The CNG variants were also discontinued, but relaunched in October 2022 with new K10C Dualjet engine.

==== Indonesia ====
The S-Presso was launched together with the second generation Baleno in Indonesia at the 29th Gaikindo Indonesia International Auto Show on 11 August 2022. The car is positioned as the indirect successor of Karimun Wagon R. It is only available as a sole unnamed grade based on the pre-updated Indian market VXI+ grade, however it has additional side body mouldings accessories and dual tone alloy wheels. Unlike the Wagon R, the S-Presso does not regulated under the Indonesian government's Low Cost Green Car (LCGC) program.

The 2023 model year was launched in February at the 30th Indonesia International Motor Show with improvements, such as a new dual-injector K10C Dualjet engine, start-stop system, ESP with hill-hold assist for AGS model, electric adjustable mirror, ISOFIX, 7-inch LCD infotainment system, steering wheel with audio control, wireless smartphone linkage, thicker window seals and adjustable head rests for the second row.

==== Philippines ====
In the Philippines, the S-Presso was unveiled on 14 March 2020 together with the XL7. Initially available in a single trim with 5-speed manual transmission, the features for this market is based on the combination of Indian market VXi and VXi+ trims.

A special edition was introduced in July 2022, based on the regular S-Presso with additional exterior and interior accessories.

In May 2023, the AGS variant was added to the lineup along with other feature upgrades, including Engine Auto Start-Stop (EASS), electronic stability program (ESP), and hill-hold control (HHC) for AGS variant only.

==== Brunei ====
The S-Presso was launched in Brunei in March 2020. It is offered only in GL variant mated to an AGS automated manual transmission.

It received an update in May 2023 with new 1.0-liter K10C Dualjet petrol engine, vehicle stability control, auto start-stop idling system, hill control assist, ISOFIX, steering wheel audio switches, and new dual-tone 14-inch alloy wheels.

=== Africa ===
==== South Africa ====
The S-Presso was launched in South Africa on 19 March 2020, in two grades: GL, GL+ and S-Edition; it is available with either a 5-speed manual or an AGS automated manual.

In December 2022, the S-Presso line-up was updated and all variants receive the new K10C Dualjet engine, stability control, hill start assist for the AGS variant, auto engine start/stop, electric mirrors, and a multi-functional steering wheel. The GL+ grade brings a 7-inch touchscreen infotainment system and 14-inch alloy wheels. The S-Edition grade brings a reversing camera, 9-inch touchscreen infotainment system and a new exterior styling kit.

==== Nigeria ====
As the follow-up of the reintroduction of Suzuki brand in Nigeria in 2019, Suzuki's distributor in Africa, CFAO Motors (fr) unveiled the S-Presso along with other Suzuki cars on 4 June 2021.

==== Tunisia ====
The Suzuki S-Presso was announced for the Tunisian market in June 2020 and became available in October the same year. This car is marketed as the cheapest micro SUV in the market.

=== Latin America ===
==== Chile ====
The S-Presso was launched in Chile on 19 March 2020, in two grades: GLX and Adventure (followed later in April 2021); only available with a 5-speed manual.

In May 2023, the S-Presso line-up was updated in terms of features, a new engine and the option of an AGS automated manual. Most importantly was the inclusion of ESP which was a mandatory features in vehicles sold in Chile since October 2022.

==== Colombia ====
The S-Presso was launched in Colombia on 4 March 2020. It is offered in two grades: GA and GL; only available with a 5-speed manual. The S-Pressos discontinued in dealerships in January 2025, and priority was given to the Suzuki Swift.

==== Peru ====
The S-Presso was launched in Peru on 11 June 2020. It is offered in two grades: GA and GL; only available with a 5-speed manual.

== Powertrain ==
Petrol
Engine	Transmission	Power	Torque
K10B; 998cc I3 VVT	5-speed manual or automated manual "AGS"	68 PS (50 kW; 67 hp) at 6000 rpm	90 N⋅m (66 lb⋅ft; 9.2 kg⋅m) at 3500 rpm
K10C Dualjet; 998cc I3; Dual VVT	5-speed manual or automated manual "AGS"	67 PS (49 kW; 66 hp) at 6000 rpm	89 N⋅m (66 lb⋅ft; 9.1 kg⋅m) at 3500 rpm
CNG
Engine	Transmission	Power	Torque
K10B; 998cc I3 VVT	5-speed manual	59 PS (43 kW; 58 hp) at 5500 rpm	78 N⋅m (58 lb⋅ft; 8.0 kg⋅m) at 3500 rpm
K10C Dualjet; 998cc I3; Dual VVT	5-speed manual	65 PS (48 kW; 64 hp) at 5500 rpm (petrol mode); 57 PS (42 kW; 56 hp) at 5300 rpm (CNG mode)	89 N⋅m (66 lb⋅ft; 9.1 kg⋅m) at 3500 rpm (petrol mode); 82 N⋅m (60 lb⋅ft; 8.4 kg⋅m) at 3400 rpm (CNG mode)

== Safety ==
As of July 2022, the Suzuki S-Presso sold in Southeast Asia and Latin America has not been independently crash-tested by ASEAN NCAP and Latin NCAP respectively. Starting from August 2024, ESP was available on all trim levels.

=== Global NCAP ===
==== South Africa ====
An S-Presso unit made in India but tested by Global NCAP 1.0 for South Africa was awarded 3 stars for adult occupants and 2 stars for child occupants in H1 2022 (similar to Latin NCAP 2013). This version was equipped with two airbags and seatbelt pretensioners as standard. In comparison to the earlier test, neck protection for the front passenger was rated the maximum possible level of 'good,' indicating a low risk of serious injury. Dummy readings of chest compression for the driver showed a moderate risk of serious injury, and the passenger compartment became unstable, resulting in chest protection being rated as 'weak,' just above the threshold to avoid being capped at one star. Suzuki declined to select child seats for the test; however, even with the restraints chosen by Global NCAP, there was excessive head excursion for the three-year-old and significant chest deceleration for both dummies.

The updated S-Presso for Africa includes ISOFIX anchorages and optional ESC.

Global NCAP 1.0 test results (South Africa) Suzuki S-Presso – 2 Airbags (H1 2022, similar to Latin NCAP 2013)
Test	Score	Stars
Adult occupant protection	8.96/17.00	3 /5 stars
Child occupant protection	15.00/49.00	2 /5 stars

==== India ====
The Maruti Suzuki S-Presso sold in India was tested by Global NCAP 1.0 in 2020 with a driver's airbag, ABS and double front seatbelt reminders, and received a zero star rating for adult protection and two stars (out of a maximum five) for child occupant protection. The front passenger's neck showed unacceptably high risk of serious injury during the frontal offset crash resulting in the loss of all points for the test. High chest compression and an unstable passenger compartment resulted in chest protection being rated poor, which would have limited the result to one star nevertheless. The footwell ruptured during the test. The test car had only a static two-point lap belt in the rear centre seat and did not offer ISOFIX anchorages. Legislative requirements in January 2022 required all Indian cars including the S-Presso to be fitted with two frontal airbags.

Global NCAP 1.0 test results (India) Maruti Suzuki S-Presso – Driver Airbag (2020, similar to Latin NCAP 2013)
Test	Score	Stars
Adult occupant protection	0.00/17.00	0 /5 stars
Child occupant protection	13.84/49.00	2 /5 stars

The S-Presso sold in India is equipped a driver frontal airbag and ABS brakes. A front passenger airbag, seatbelt pretensioners and ISOFIX child seat anchorages were optional, the first two being made standard in early 2022. Updated versions of the S-Presso offer ESC on variants with an AGS option. The S-Presso does not offer side airbags or tyre-pressure monitoring.

In H2 2022 the S-Presso for India was again crash tested by Global NCAP under its new protocol (similar to Latin NCAP 2016) which now includes side-impact crash tests, but it was rated 1 star for adult occupants and 0 for toddlers.

Global NCAP 2.0 test results (India) Maruti Suzuki S-Presso (H2 2022, similar to Latin NCAP 2016)
Test	Score	Stars
Adult occupant protection	20.03/34.00	1 /5 stars
Child occupant protection	3.52/49.00	0 /5 stars

== Sales ==
Calendar year	India	Philippines	South Africa	Indonesia	Chile	Colombia
2019	35,254					
2020	67,690	1,930	3,601			407
2021	65,748	3,429	6,343			1,243
2022	65,276		4,953	2,298		1,552
2023	31,368		5,009	3,617	2,475	289
2024				2,895	1,516	
2025				1,572		
