= Maruti Suzuki Alto =

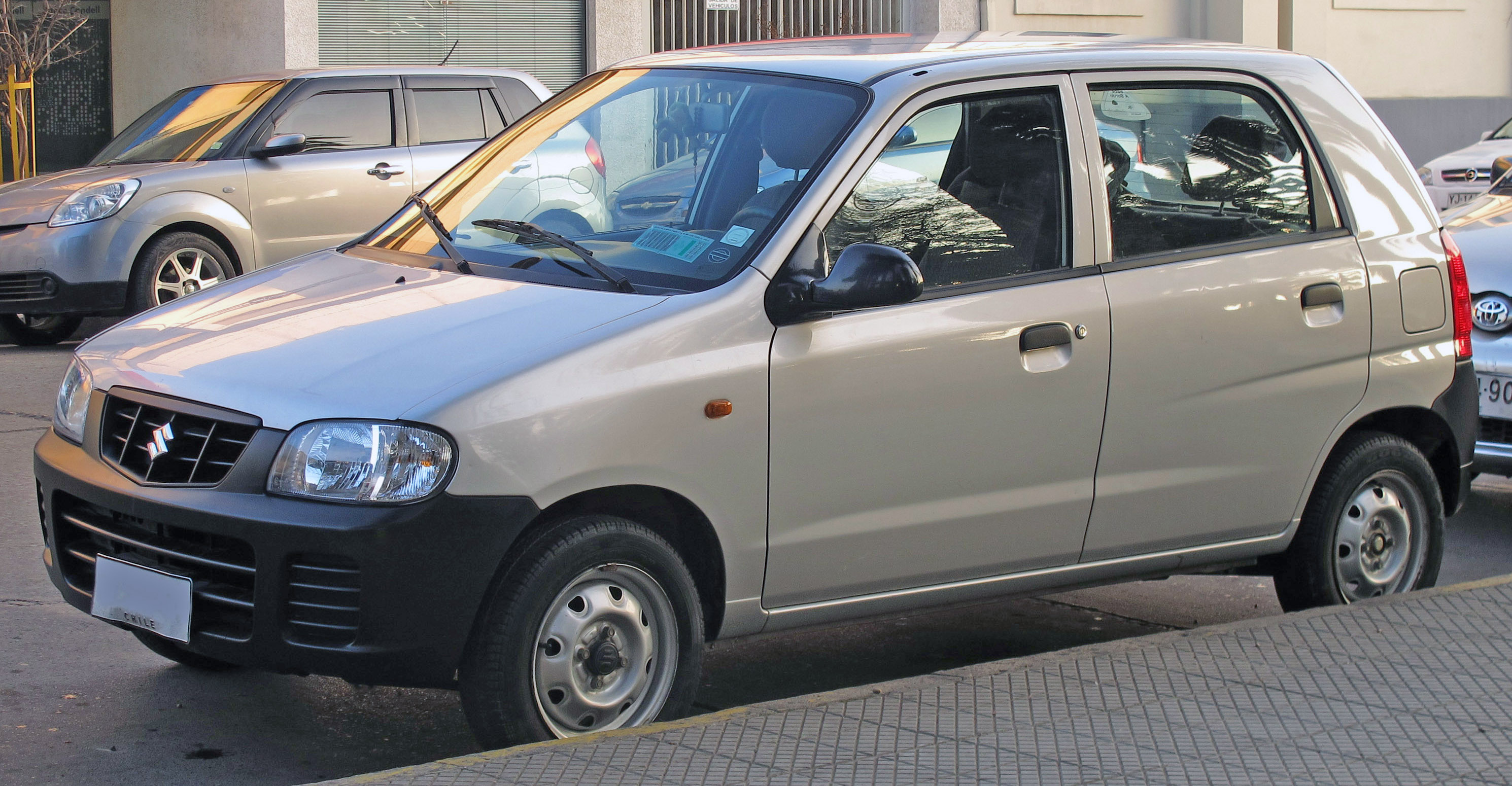
- Suzuki Alto (Chile)

Overview
- Manufacturer: Maruti Suzuki
- Also called: Suzuki Alto
- Production: 2000–present (Alto K10); 2000-2021 (Alto 800)

Body and chassis
- Class: City car (A)
- Body style: 5-door hatchback
- Layout: Front-engine, front-wheel-drive

Chronology
- Predecessor: Maruti Suzuki 800

The Maruti Suzuki Alto is a city car manufactured and marketed by Suzuki through its subsidiary Maruti Suzuki primarily for the Indian market since 2000. The first-generation model was essentially the Indian version of the fifth-generation Suzuki Alto kei car (with larger engine options). The second generation was made as a standalone model, which was built on the same platform as the first generation. The third-generation model is built on the same underpinnings as the S-Presso.

Since 2006, the Alto has been India's best-selling car and crossed the 1 million production figure in February 2008 becoming the third Maruti model to cross the million mark in India after the Maruti 800 and Maruti Omni and fourth overall after the Hyundai Santro. As of 2024, the Alto is the only car in India to have sold over 5 million units.

== First generation (RF; 2000) ==
First generation (RF)
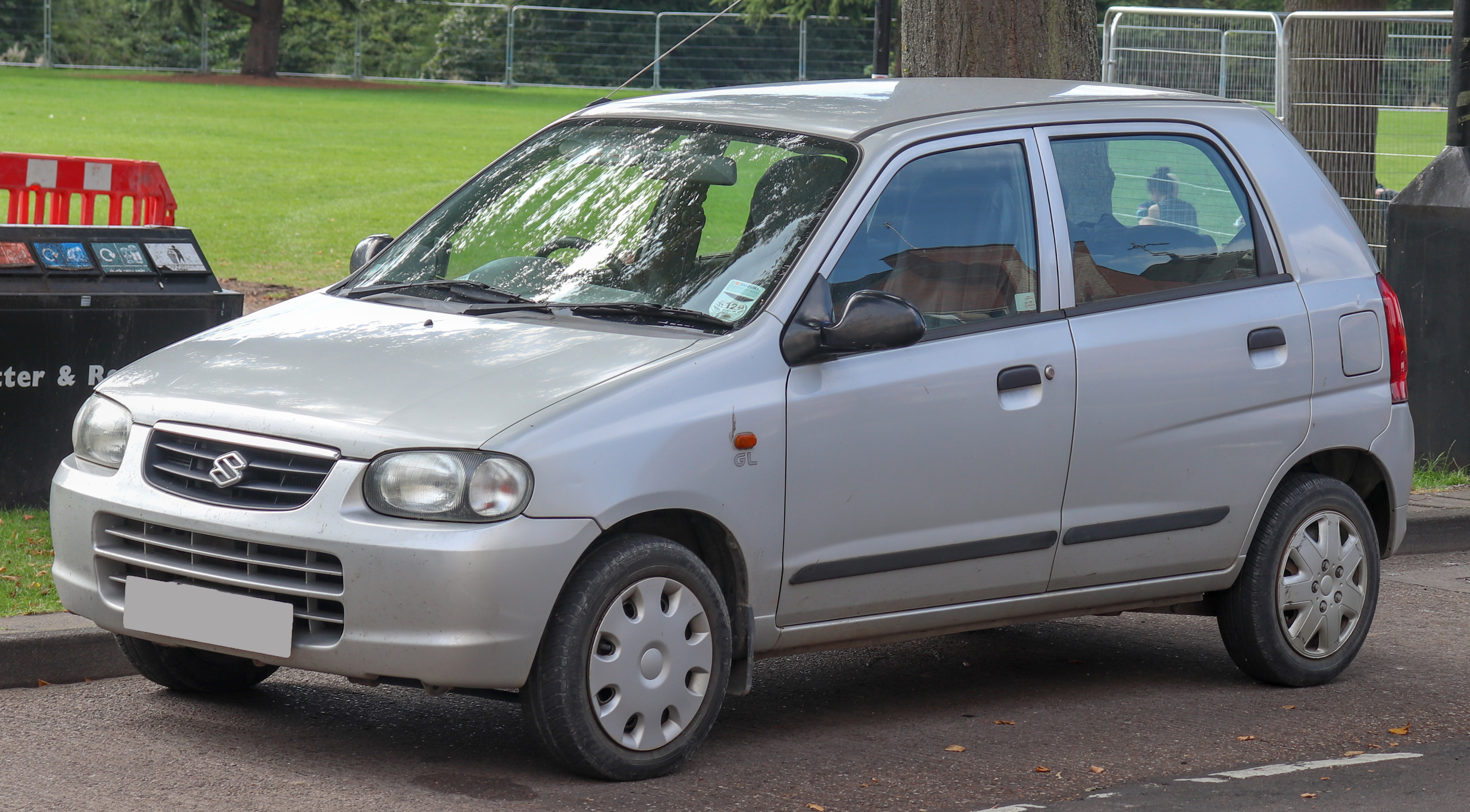
- 2004 Suzuki Alto GL 1.1 (UK; pre-facelift)

Overview
- Production: 2000–2014
- Assembly: India: Manesar (Maruti Suzuki)

Body and chassis
- Related: Suzuki Alto (HA12)

Powertrain
- Engine: Petrol: 796 cc F8D I3; 998 cc K10B I3; 1061 cc F10D I4
- Transmission: 5-speed manual; 3-speed automatic

Dimensions
- Wheelbase: 2,360 mm (92.9 in)
- Length: 3,495 mm (137.6 in); 3,620 mm (142.5 in) (K10)
- Width: 1,475 mm (58.1 in); 1,495 mm (58.9 in) (with body mouldings)
- Height: 1,460 mm (57.5 in)
- Curb weight: 740–820 kg (1,631–1,808 lb)

The first generation was launched to the local Indian market on 27 September 2000 although the Alto nameplate had been successfully used to export the Maruti Suzuki Zen to Europe from India since around 1994, having captured over 40% market share in Belgium and 33% in Netherlands by 1998. The original Alto 800 carries the RF308 chassis code while the three-cylinder K10 is RF310; the four-cylinder export version is RF410.

The Alto was seen as a natural successor to the time-tested and equally popular Maruti 800 (MB 308). It included all the advantages of the 800 model for Indian car buyers, along with additional features such as power steering, power-assisted braking, and a fifth gear, which the 800 lacked. The Alto's popularity has grown steadily in recent years, largely due to its competitive pricing, which has been reduced thanks to lower excise duties. The Alto became the first car in India to sell over 200,000 units in a single financial year, with the last 100,000 units sold within just five months. It also became the only car to sell more than 22,000 units in a single month. Maruti's extensive network of dealerships and Authorized Service Centers (MASS) has significantly contributed to the Alto's substantial success in the Indian entry-level car market.

=== Alto K10 (RF310) ===
Maruti Suzuki India launched a new version of the first generation Alto in the Indian auto market in August 2010, the Alto K10. The new Maruti Alto K10 is equipped with the company's 1.0-litre, K-series DOHC inline-three petrol engine which also powered the Celerio and Wagon R, mated to a five-speed manual transmission. The 998 cc (60.9 cu in) K10B engine delivers 68 PS (50 kW) of maximum power at 6200 rpm with 90 N⋅m (66 lb⋅ft; 9 kg⋅m) of maximum torque at 3200 rpm. The K10 has a redesigned front end, with more sculpted headlights. This spelled the end for the F10-engined model, while the F8-engined Alto was replaced by the all-new Alto 800 in late 2012. The Alto K10 remained in production until 2014.

=== Europe ===
This model, using the fuel injected 1061 cc F10D engine, entered the European market at the March 2002 Geneva Motor Show. Being built in India by Maruti, it was only available with five doors, unlike earlier Maruti Zen-based Altos in Europe. Unlike in India, European model Alto was available with a 3-speed automatic transmission option. The car was discontinued in 2006.

=== Specifications ===
Until the late 2010 introduction of the K10 Alto, it was powered by a three-cylinder 796 cc (48.6 cu in) gasoline engine with four valves per cylinder, MPFI and a 32-bit ECM. All models have a five-speed manual transmission. There also used to be a VX/VXi model (RF410) with a four-cylinder 1061-cc engine with 63 PS (46 kW) and 85 N⋅m (9 kg⋅m; 63 lb⋅ft) torque, launched in April 2001. This has now been discontinued, although it was sold for longer in certain European countries. The VX model also featured a tachometer not found in lesser Altos.

Alto 800 (RF308):

- Maximum Power: 47 PS (35 kW) at 6200 rpm
- Torque: 69 N⋅m (51 lbf⋅ft) at 3500 rpm
- Acceleration 0–100 km/h: approximately 20 seconds
- Top Speed: 137 km/h (85 mph)

Alto 1.1 (RF410):

- Maximum Power: 63 PS (46 kW) at 6000 rpm
- Torque: 85 N⋅m (63 lbf⋅ft) at 3200 rpm
- Acceleration 0–100 km/h: approximately 15 seconds
- Top Speed:
  - 155 km/h (96 mph) (manual)
  - 145 km/h (90 mph) (automatic)

Alto K10 (RF310):

- Maximum Power: 68 PS (50 kW) at 6200 rpm
- Torque: 90 N⋅m (66 lbf⋅ft) at 3200 rpm
- Acceleration 0–100 km/h: approximately 13 seconds
- Top Speed: approximately 160 km/h (99 mph)

=== Safety ===
The Indian-made K10 version in its most basic Latin American market configuration with no airbags was crash tested by Latin NCAP 1.0 in 2013. It received 0 stars for the adult occupant and 3 stars for child occupant. The car is not equipped with airbags, front seatbelts with pretensioner, ISOFIX or ABS.

=== Gallery ===
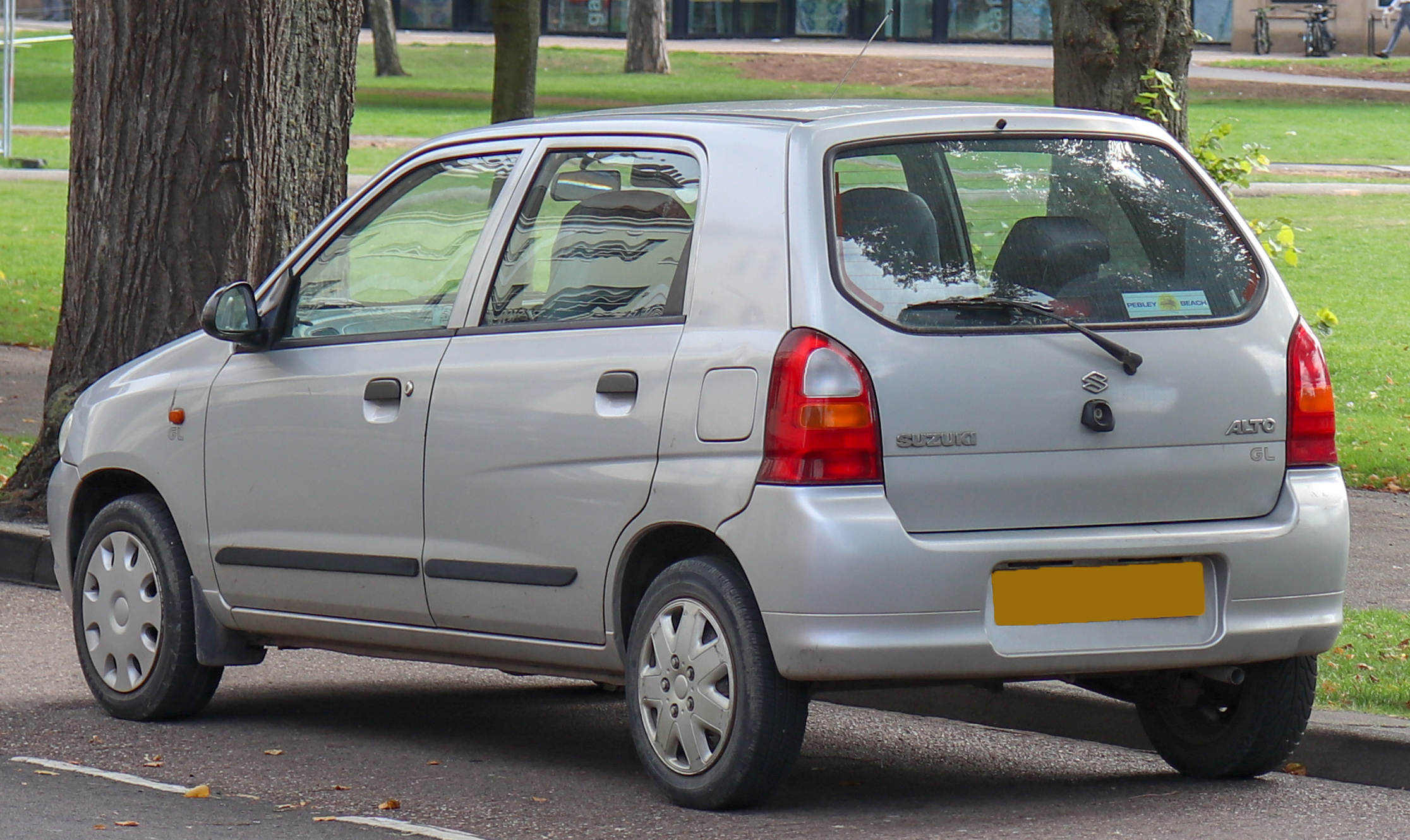
2004 Suzuki Alto GL 1.1 (UK; pre-facelift)

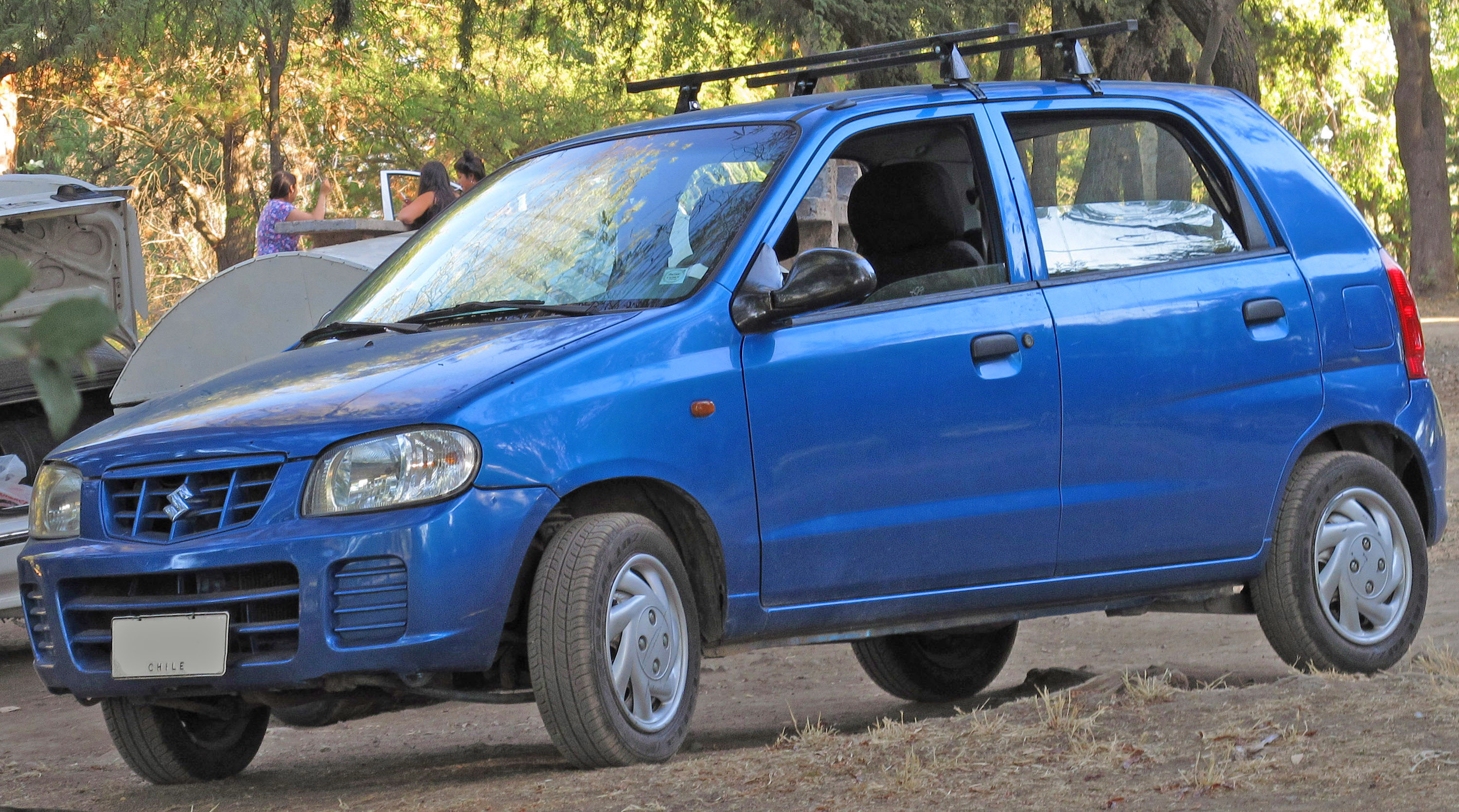
2007 Suzuki Alto GL (Chile; facelift)

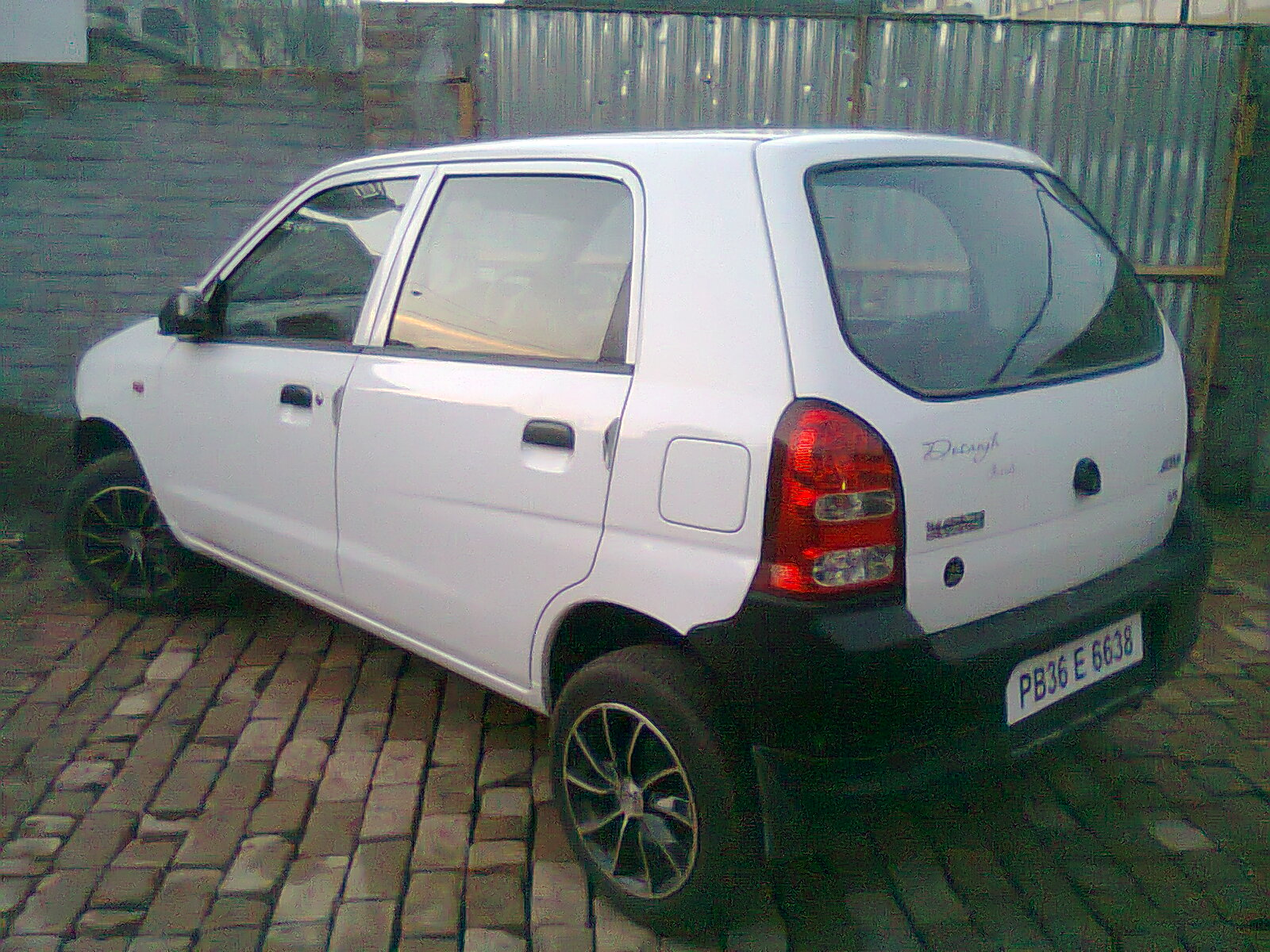
Maruti Suzuki Alto (India; facelift)

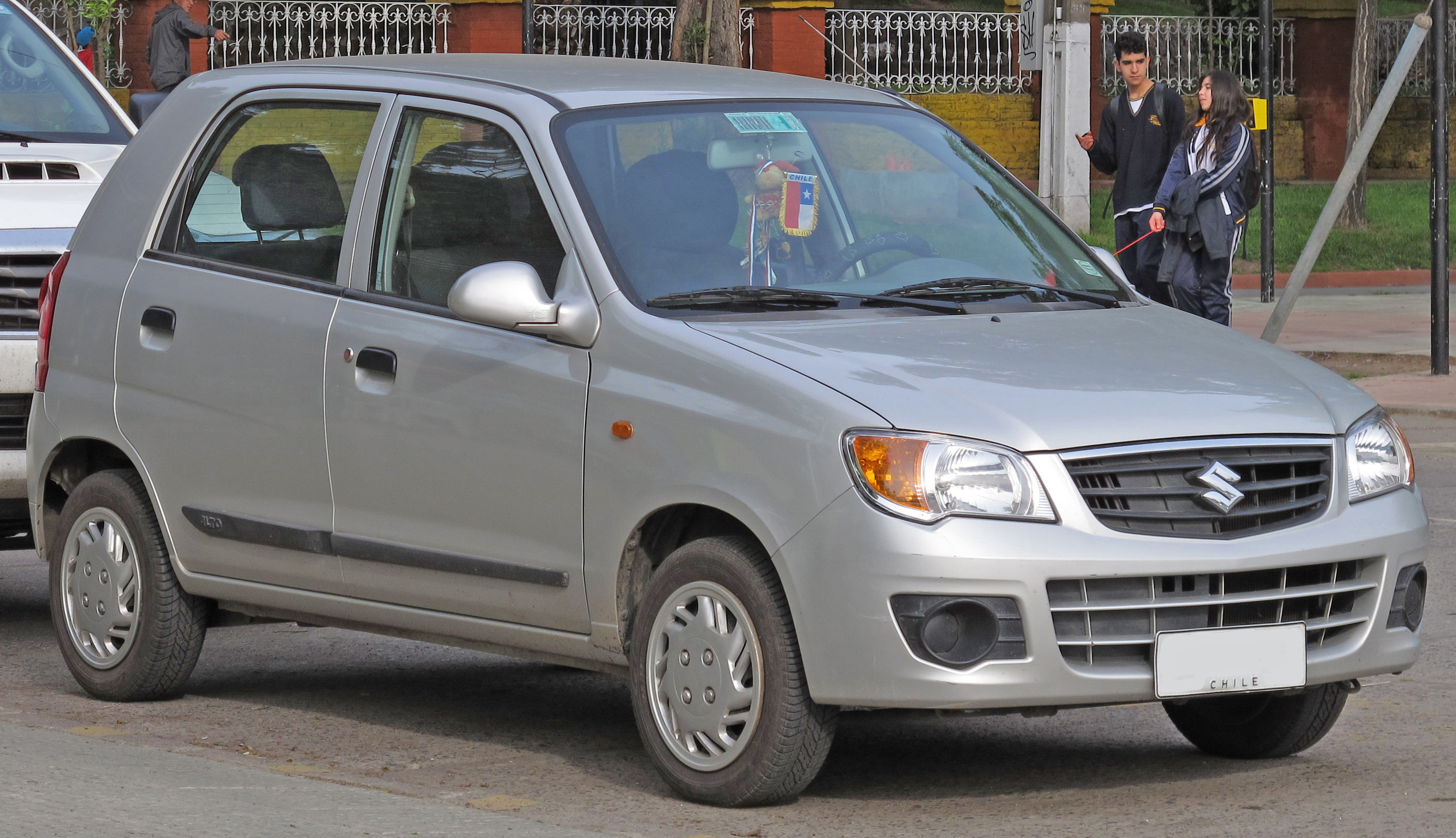
2011 Suzuki Alto K10 DLX (Chile)

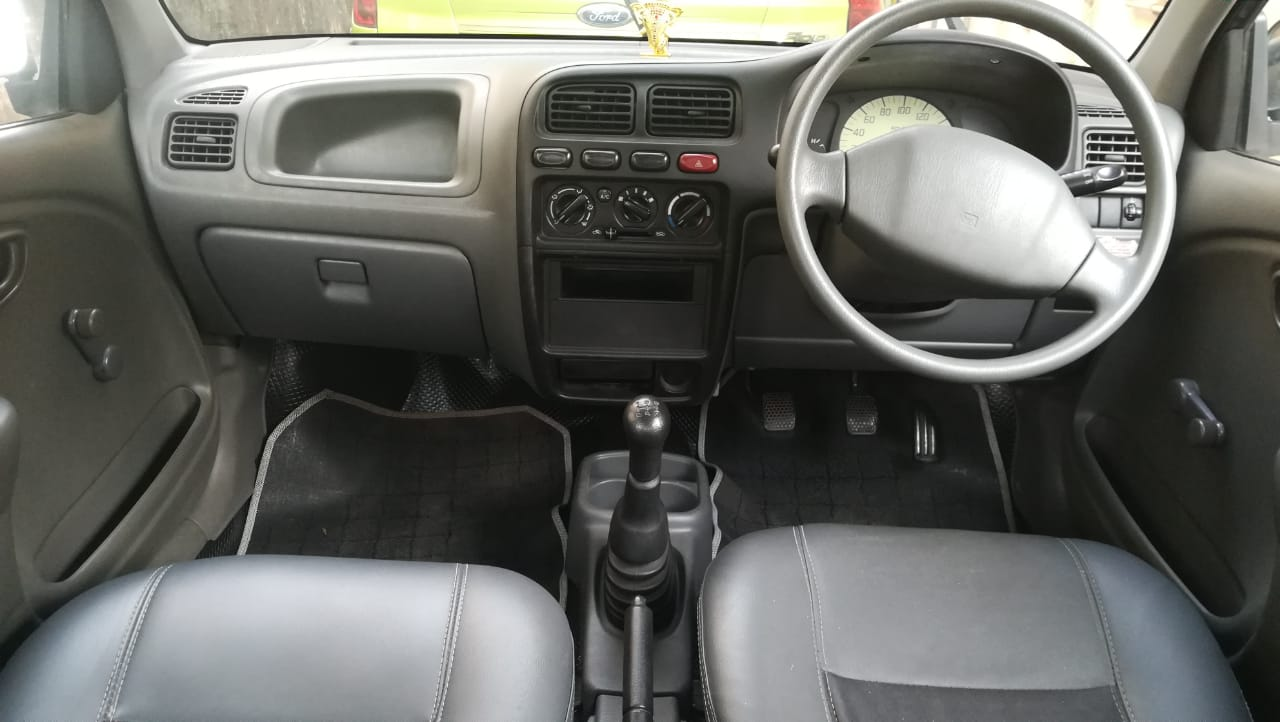
Dashboard of a 2008 Maruti Suzuki Alto

== Second generation (AOD; 2012) ==
Second generation (AOD)
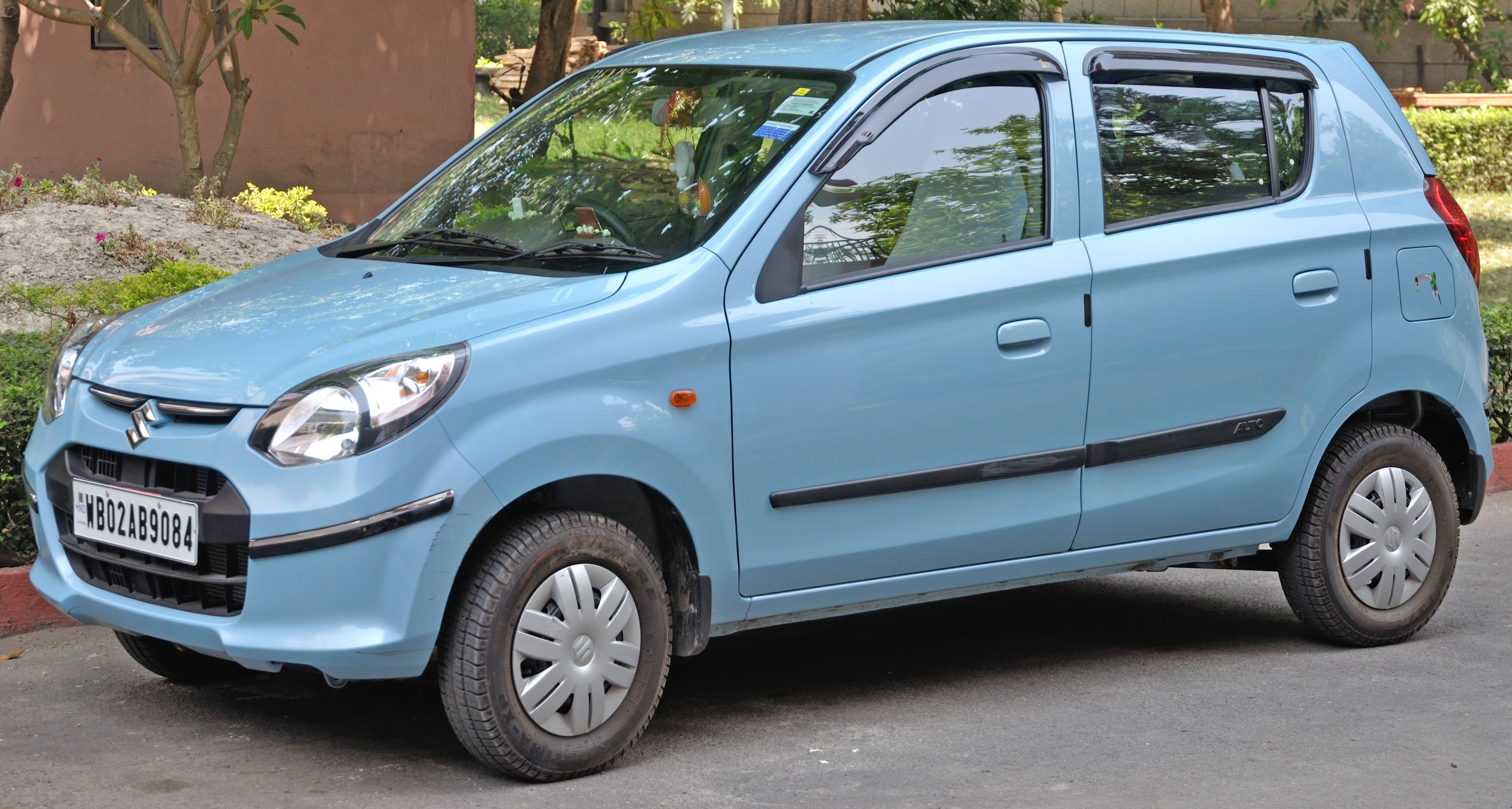
- Maruti Suzuki Alto 800 LXi (India; pre-facelift)

Overview
- Production: 2012–2021 (Alto 800); 2014–2022 (Alto K10)
- Assembly: India: Manesar (Maruti Suzuki); Algeria: Saïda (Groupe Tahkout)

Powertrain
- Engine: Petrol/CNG: 796 cc F8D I3 (AOD308); 998 cc K10B I3 (AOD310)
- Transmission: 5-speed manual; 5-speed AMT "AGS"

Dimensions
- Wheelbase: 2,360 mm (92.9 in)
- Length: 3,395 mm (133.7 in) (pre-facelift 800); 3,430 mm (135.0 in) (first facelift 800); 3,445 mm (135.6 in) (second facelift 800); 3,545 mm (139.6 in) (K10)
- Width: 1,490 mm (58.7 in); 1,515 mm (59.6 in) (with body side mouldings)
- Height: 1,475 mm (58.1 in)
- Curb weight: 695–850 kg (1,532–1,874 lb) (800); 740–867 kg (1,631–1,911 lb) (K10)

A new version of the Alto called the Alto 800 was released in the Indian car market on 16 October 2012. The Alto 800, model code AOD308, is still based on the previous generation's platform (which is still based on the 1998 Alto kei car) but received all-new bodywork and interior. It replaced the first generation Maruti Alto (although the predecessor continued to be produced for a little longer), and while keeping the same 796 cc (48.6 cu in) engine, there have been several modifications. The base price of the Alto, already India's best-selling car, was actually lowered with the new model, as it replaced the venerable Maruti 800. Various methods were found to lower the price, including lowering the weight of each individual component by one gram each, and also by building their own robots for manufacturing the car. It was also sold as the Suzuki Alto 800 in many export markets. In May 2016, a refreshed version of Alto 800 was introduced with notable changes to the exterior, interior, features and specifications. The new Maruti Alto 800 comes with improved fuel efficiency and is now capable of returning a mileage of 24.7 km/L (58.1 mpg US) In April 2019, the car received another refresh. The Alto 800 did not comply with BSVI emissions standards and was thus discontinued in 2021 when BSVI Stage II was enforced.

=== Alto K10 ===
Maruti Suzuki then launched a K10-powered version of the second generation Alto (AOD310) on 3 November 2014. Introduced at a base price of Rs. 3.06 Lakh, the next gen Alto K10 comes with multiple exterior and interiors updates, however mechanically it remains same. The car is a somewhat upgraded version of the Alto 800 with a new front fascia comprising a new chrome fitted front grille, new swept back headlamps, and a redesigned bonnet line. There are also amendments for tail lights, restructuring of bumpers, 13-inch wheels, door mirrors, door moulding and some other minor modifications. Interiors too have been updated, with a new dashboard, three-spoke steering wheel, refined upholstery, black finished music system and a better looking instrument cluster. Other added features inside the car include front power windows, 12 V power socket, internally adjustable door mirrors, headlamp warning buzzer, key off reminder and gearshift indicator.

Powering the 2015 Alto K10 is the same 1.0-litre K10B engine that also powers the Celerio and Wagon R. However, this time it has been tuned to provide better fuel economy, and the new Alto K10 returns an ARAI-certified fuel economy of 24.06 km/L (56.6 mpg US), 15 percent better than the outgoing model. The Alto K10 facelift is available with two different transmission; 5-speed manual and 5-speed Auto Gear Shift (AGS) transmission. The AGS is an automated manual transmission technology, which shifts gear with the help of an ECU mapped actuator on pre-defined engine speeds. It also allows driver to shift gears when required.

The Alto K10 was discontinued in 2022, being temporarily replaced by the S-Presso. The 800 cc variant was later fully discontinued in 2022 due to new emission standards.

=== Safety ===
Global NCAP 1.0 test results (India) Maruti Suzuki Alto – No Airbags (2014, similar to Latin NCAP 2013)
Test	Score	Stars
Adult occupant protection	0.00/17.00	0 /5 stars
Child occupant protection	17.57/49.00	2 /5 stars

In 2014, an Alto 800 with no airbags and no ABS was crash tested by Global NCAP 1.0 (similar to Latin NCAP 2013). The car received 0 stars for adult occupant and 2 stars for child occupant.

=== Gallery ===
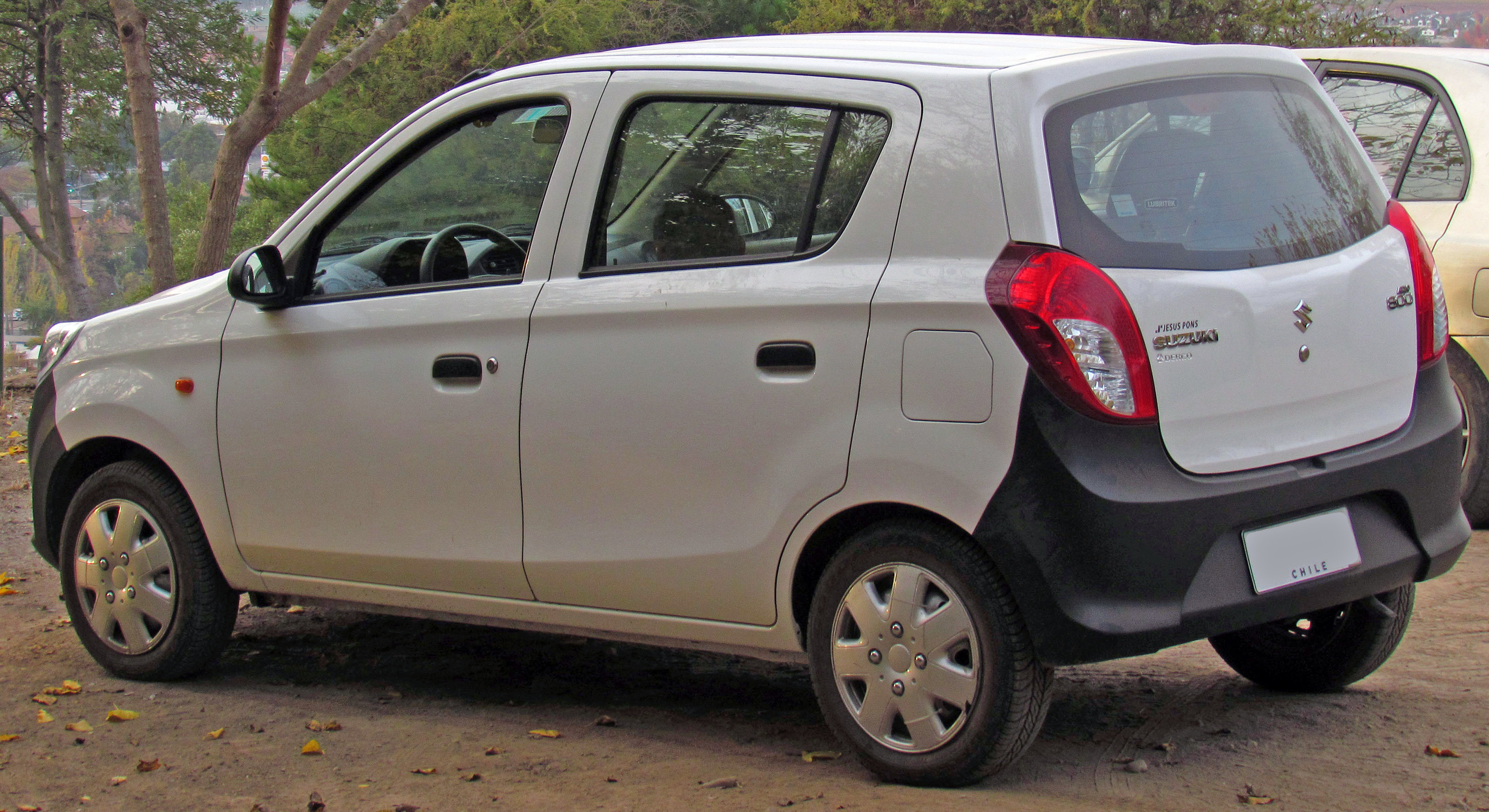
2014 Suzuki Alto 800 GL (Chile; pre-facelift)

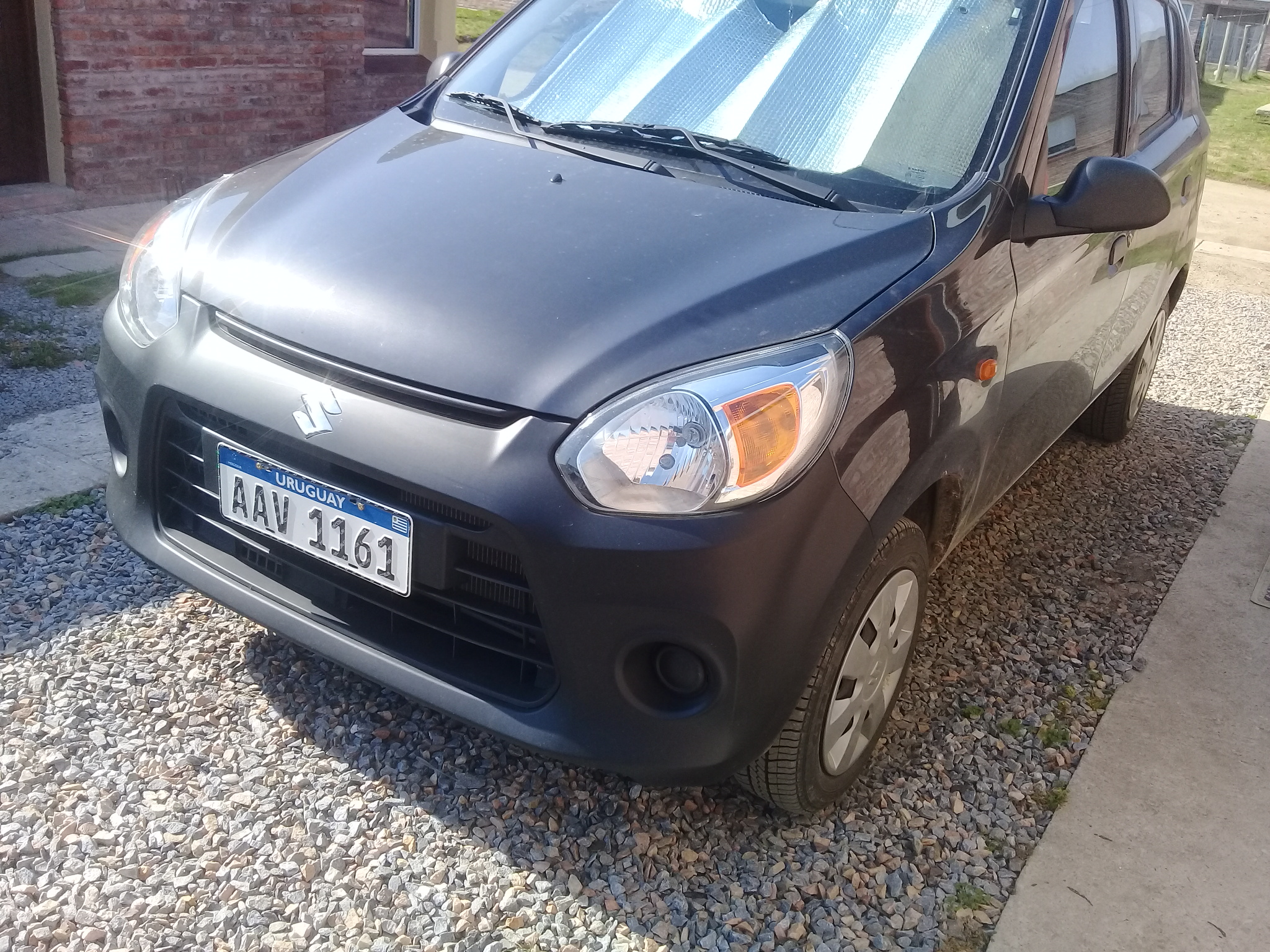
2016 Suzuki Alto 800 (Uruguay; first facelift)

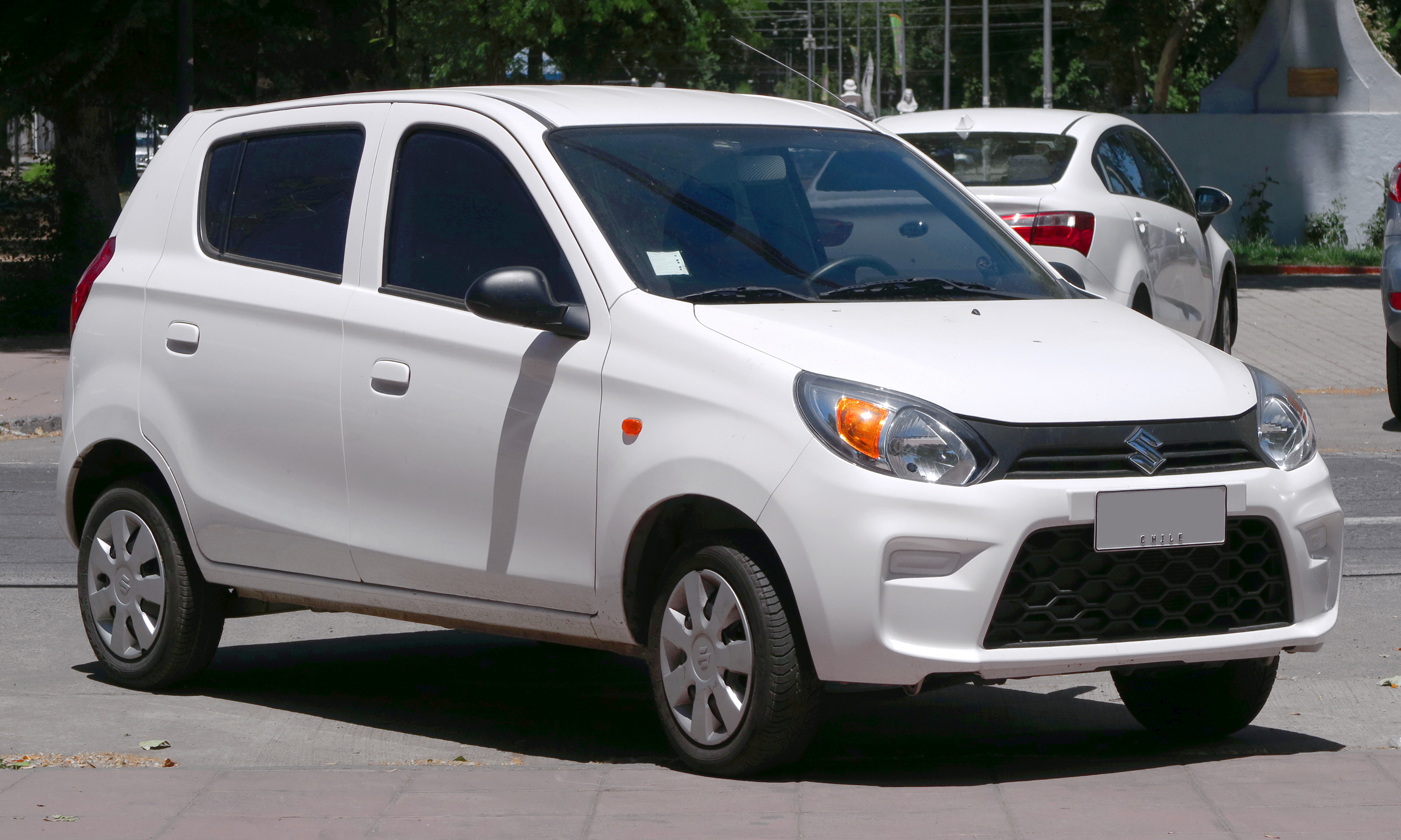
2020 Suzuki Alto 800 (Chile; second facelift)

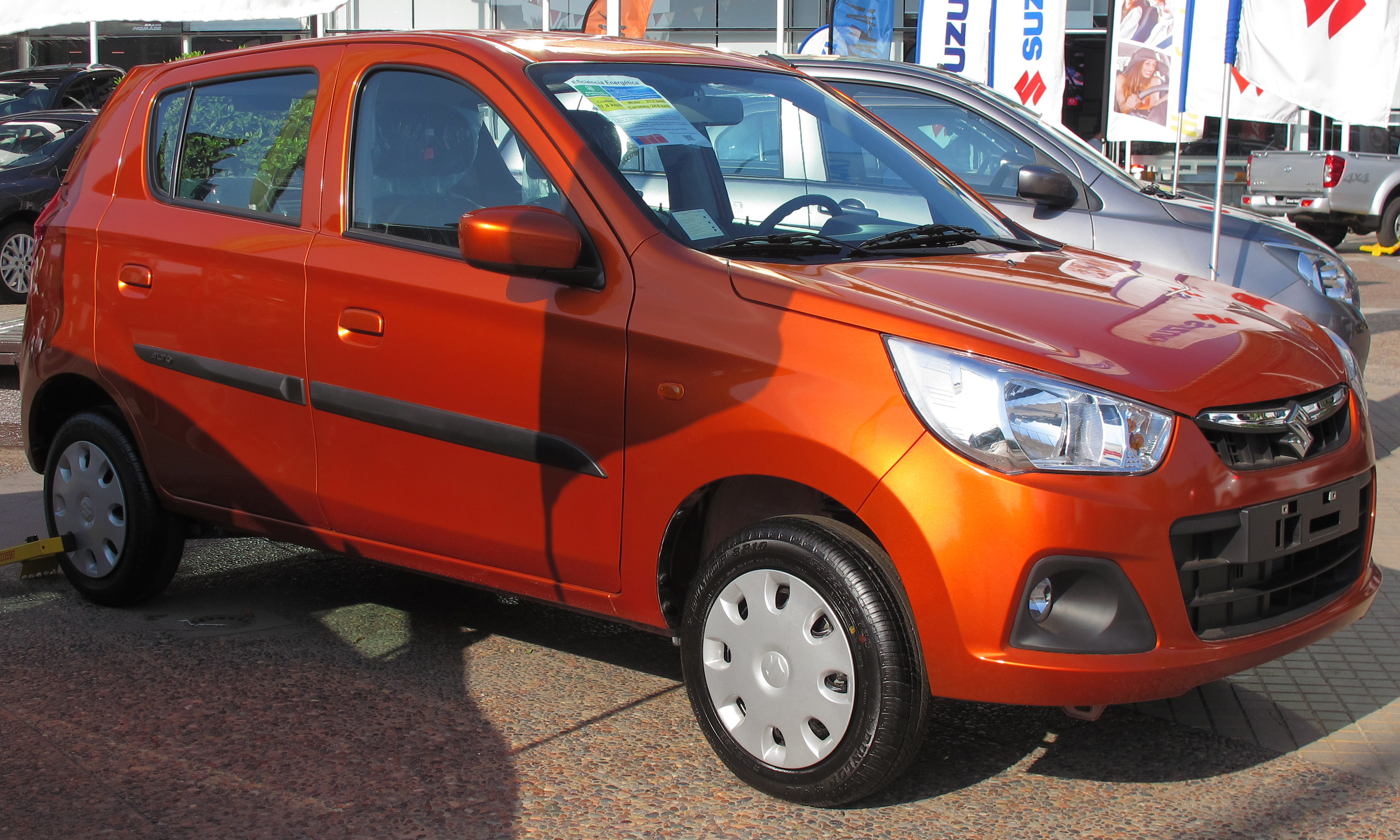
2016 Suzuki Alto K10 GLX (Chile)

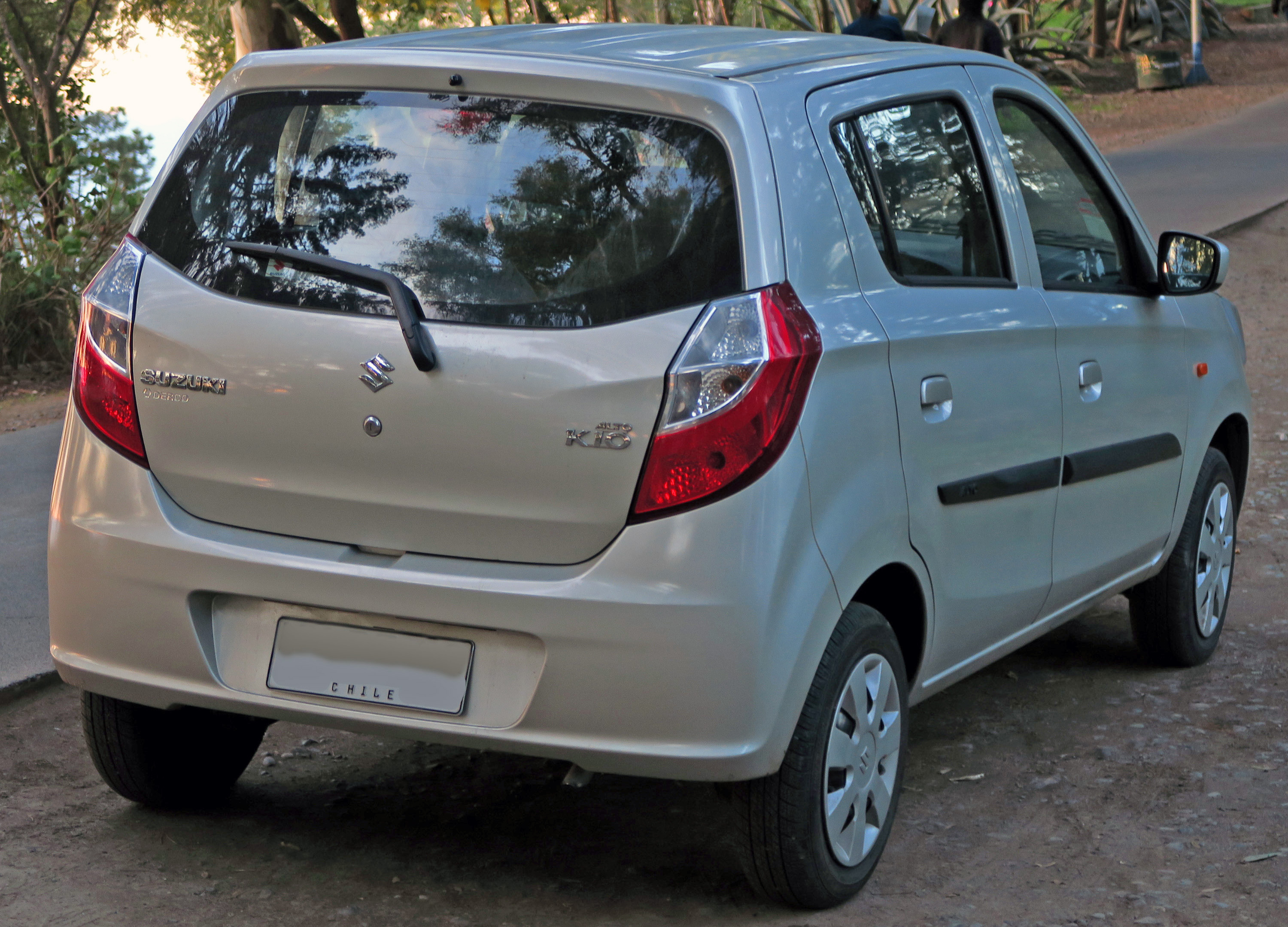
2018 Suzuki Alto K10 GLX (Chile)

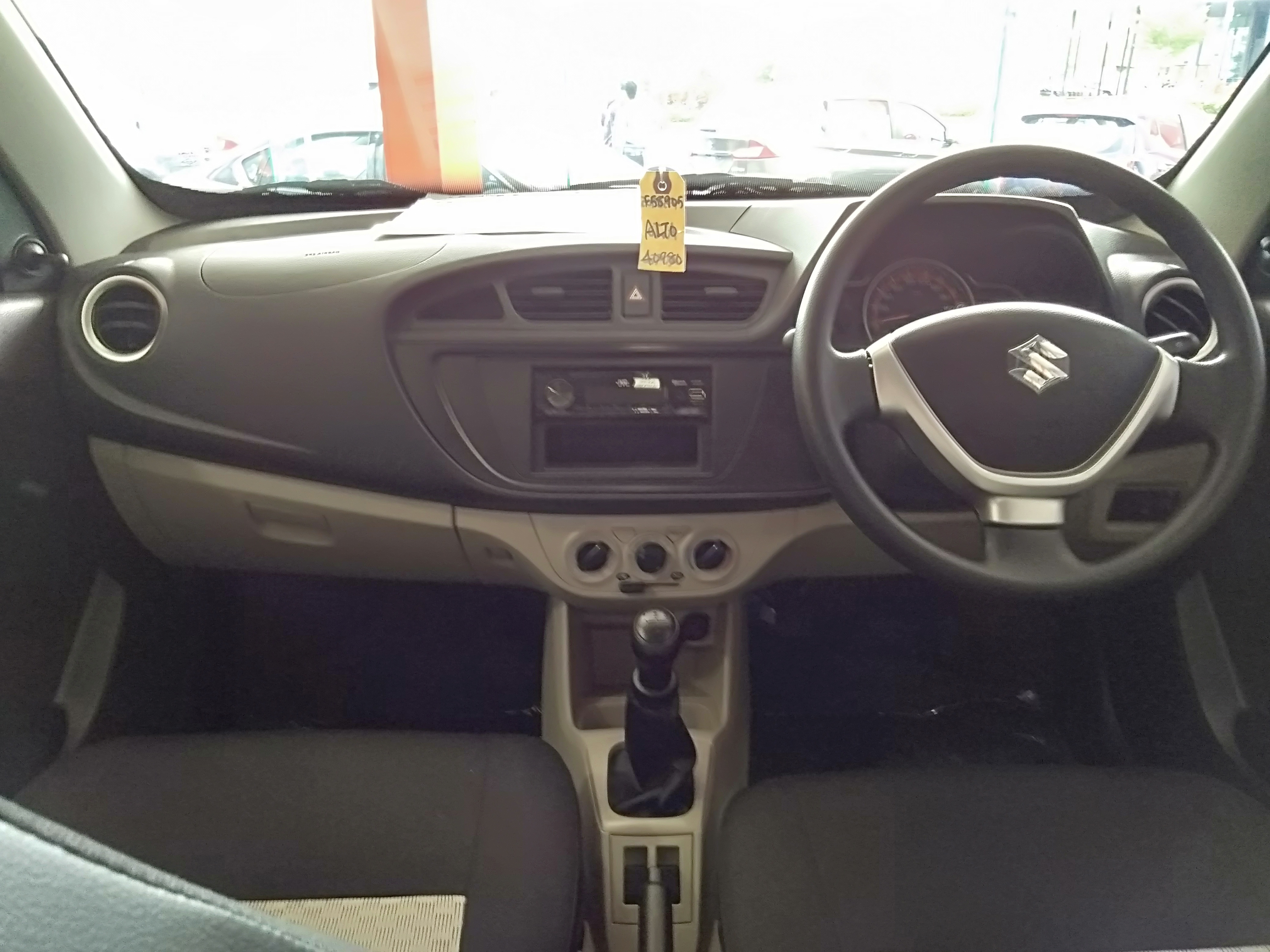
Interior

== Third generation (2022) ==
Third generation
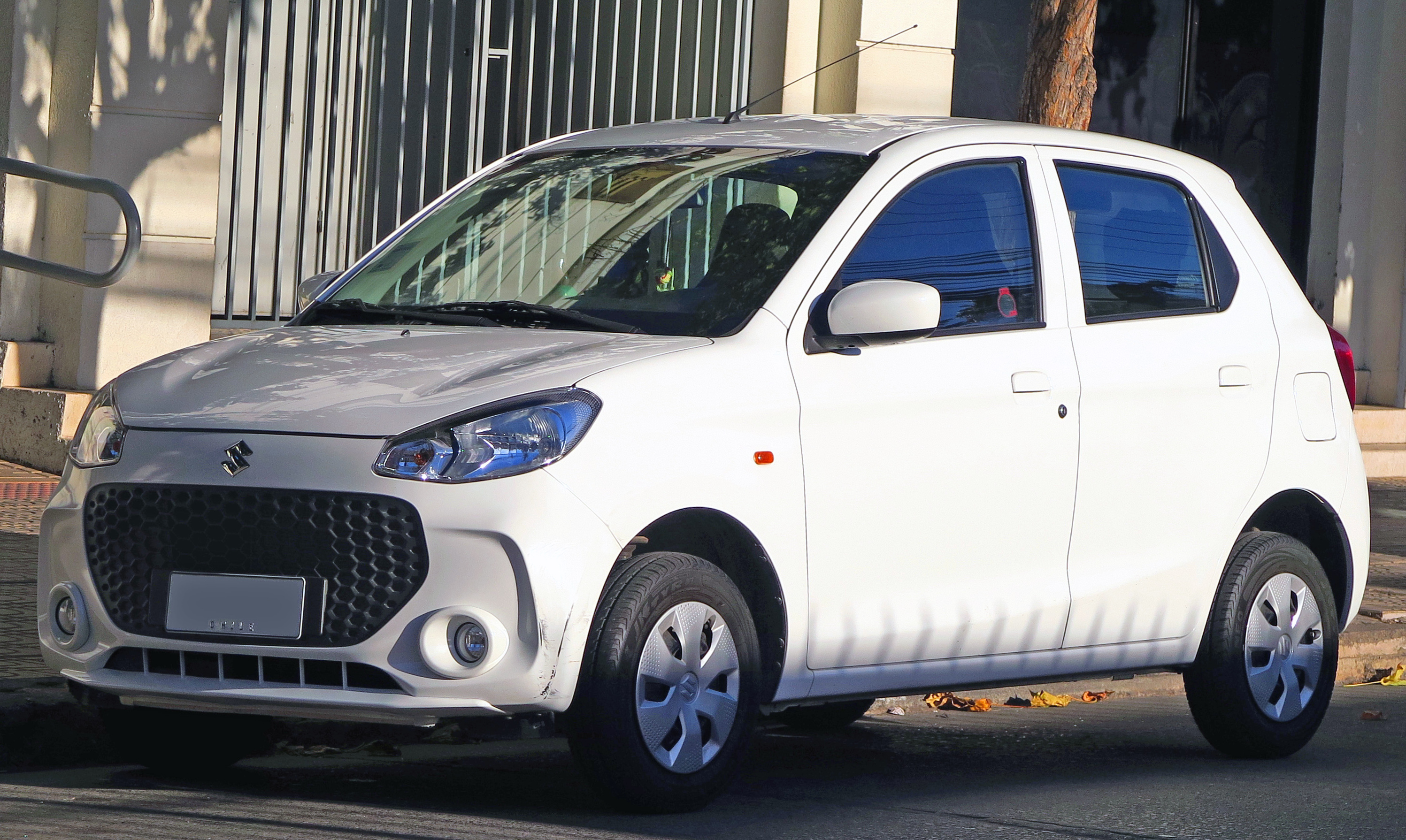
- 2024 Suzuki Alto 1.0 GL (Chile)

Overview
- Also called: Suzuki Tour H1 (LCV)
- Production: 2022–present
- Assembly: India: Manesar (Maruti Suzuki)

Body and chassis
- Platform: HEARTECT
- Related: Suzuki S-Presso

Powertrain
- Engine: Petrol/CNG: 998 cc K10C I3
- Power output: 67 PS (49 kW)
- Transmission: 5-speed manual; 5-speed AGS automanual

Dimensions
- Wheelbase: 2,380 mm (93.7 in)
- Length: 3,530 mm (139.0 in)
- Width: 1,490 mm (58.7 in)
- Height: 1,520 mm (59.8 in)

The Alto K10 was launched in India as a new generation on 18 August 2022 after two years of hiatus. It is built on the HEARTECT platform shared with the S-Presso.

=== Safety ===
Maruti Alto K10 rated 2 star for adults and 0 stars for toddlers in Global NCAP 2.0 (similar to Bharat NCAP, based on Latin NCAP 2016) in 2023. Starting from August 2024, ESP was made standard on all trim levels. On 2nd March 2025 Maruti Suzuki made six airbags standard on all variants.

Global NCAP 2.0 test results (India) 2023 Maruti Suzuki Alto K10 'LXI', RHD (2023, similar to Latin NCAP 2016)
Test	Score	Stars
Adult occupant protection	21.67/34.00	2 /5 stars
Child occupant protection	3.52/49.00	0 /5 stars
