= Suzuki Mehran =

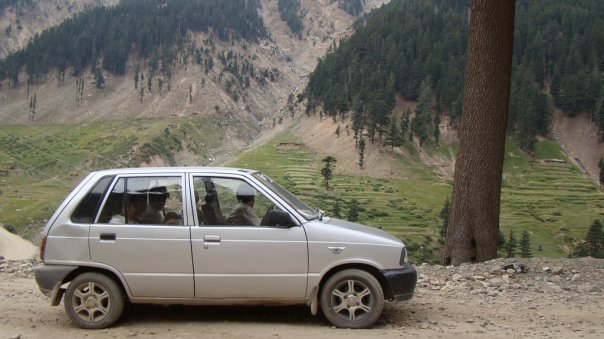
- A Suzuki Mehran (VX) at Lowari Pass, Chitral, KPK

Overview
- Manufacturer: Pak Suzuki Motors
- Also called: Suzuki Fronte; Maruti 800 (India)
- Production: 1988–2019
- Assembly: Pakistan
- Designer: Suzuki

Body and chassis
- Class: City car
- Body style: 5-door hatchback
- Related: Maruti 800 (India)

Powertrain
- Engine: 796 cc F8B I3
- Transmission: 4-speed manual

Dimensions
- Wheelbase: 2,175 mm (85.6 in)
- Length: 3,300 mm (129.9 in)
- Width: 1,405 mm (55.3 in)
- Height: 1,410 mm (55.5 in)
- Kerb weight: 660 KG

Chronology
- Successor: Suzuki Alto (HA36)

The Suzuki Mehran is a rebadged version of the second-generation Suzuki Alto CA/CC71, manufactured by Pak Suzuki Motors. It was introduced as the successor to the classic Suzuki FX, a rebadged First Generation Suzuki Alto (SS80S). Upon its introduction to the Pakistani market in 1989, the Suzuki Mehran had a retail price of PKR.90,000. In November 2016, the Suzuki Mehran sold for around 650,000 Pakistani rupee ($3892).

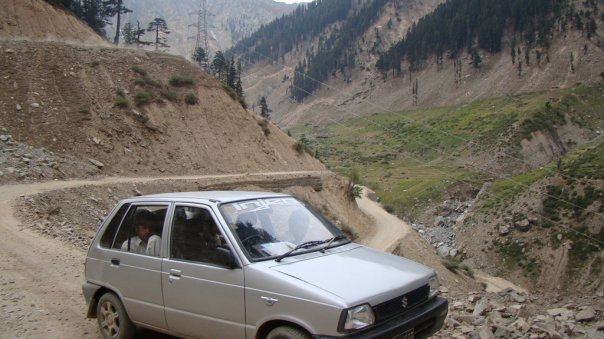
Front

== History ==
In 2013, a Euro-II model was introduced, the only notable difference was the use of an electronic fuel injection system that replaced the already long-outdated carburettor that came installed in models up until 2012. The car was badged with a "euro-II" mark on the rear and sold at a higher price.

In 2015, press reports indicated the car sold for US$6,500-7700, despite lacking essential and basic safety features such as airbags, ABS, rear window defogger, side air conditioner vents, seat belt reminder and even rear seat belts. Front row seat belts first came preinstalled during the mid-2000s. Besides the suspension system that was based on a low-cost, obsolete leaf spring rigid axle, the car had remained almost exactly the same over its 32-year production span, with absolutely no significant changes made to the interior or exterior, other than the gradual reduction in build quality over the years. The vehicle during the last two decades towards its end of production was reminiscent of a bygone era, having an outdated and obsolete look. Towards the end of production, local parts content had increased to 72 percent.

Maintenance on the Mehran was relatively cheaper, this is what allowed it to have a higher resale value than most other vehicles in the market. Despite being obsolete, the car still had a high demand. In September 2018 (the highest selling year for the model), Pak Suzuki accounted for having sold 47,199 units in the country. From June 1999 to 2018, just under 600,000 Mehrans were sold in Pakistan. The lowest number sold was in 2001, with 5,169 units sold. As compared to other locally assembled cars. By February 2019, Pak Suzuki had taken up the prices to their highest extent, with the basic variant "VX" having a retail price of PKR.825,000 with a choice of three colors – White, Silky Silver, and the darker Graphite Grey.

Pak Suzuki finally ended production for the Mehran in March 2019, when it was discontinued in favor of the Eighth generation Alto (HA36S) which was introduced later that year.

== Technical specifications ==
=== Dimensions ===
- Body type: five-door hatchback
- Overall length: 3,300 mm (129.9 in)
- Overall width: 1,405 mm (55.3 in)
- Overall height: 1,410 mm (55.5 in)
- Wheelbase: 2,175 mm (85.6 in)
- Tread front: 1,215 mm (47.8 in)
- Tread rear: 1,200 mm (47.2 in)
- Minimum turning radius: 2.4 m (7.9 ft)

=== Engine ===
- Engine: 796 cc F8B (carburetor, later EFI)
- Type: Carburetor, EFI (Euro II)
- No. of cylinders: three cylinder
- Top speed: 140 km/h
- EFI mileage 18 km/L (Euro II) on highway.
- EFI mileage 13 km/L (Euro II) in city
- Piston displacement: 800 cc
- Bore × stroke: 68.5 mm × 72.0 mm
- Max. output (kW / rpm): 29.4/5,500
- Max. torque (Nm / rpm): 59.0/3,000

=== Chassis ===
- Steering: manual (no power assist)
- Suspension front: MacPherson strut.
- Suspension rear: leaf springs only rear
- Brakes: front disks and rear drums (no ABS nor a Brake Booster)

== See also ==
- Pak Suzuki Motors
- Maruti 800
- Transport in Pakistan
