= Tawon Car =

Indonesian mini car

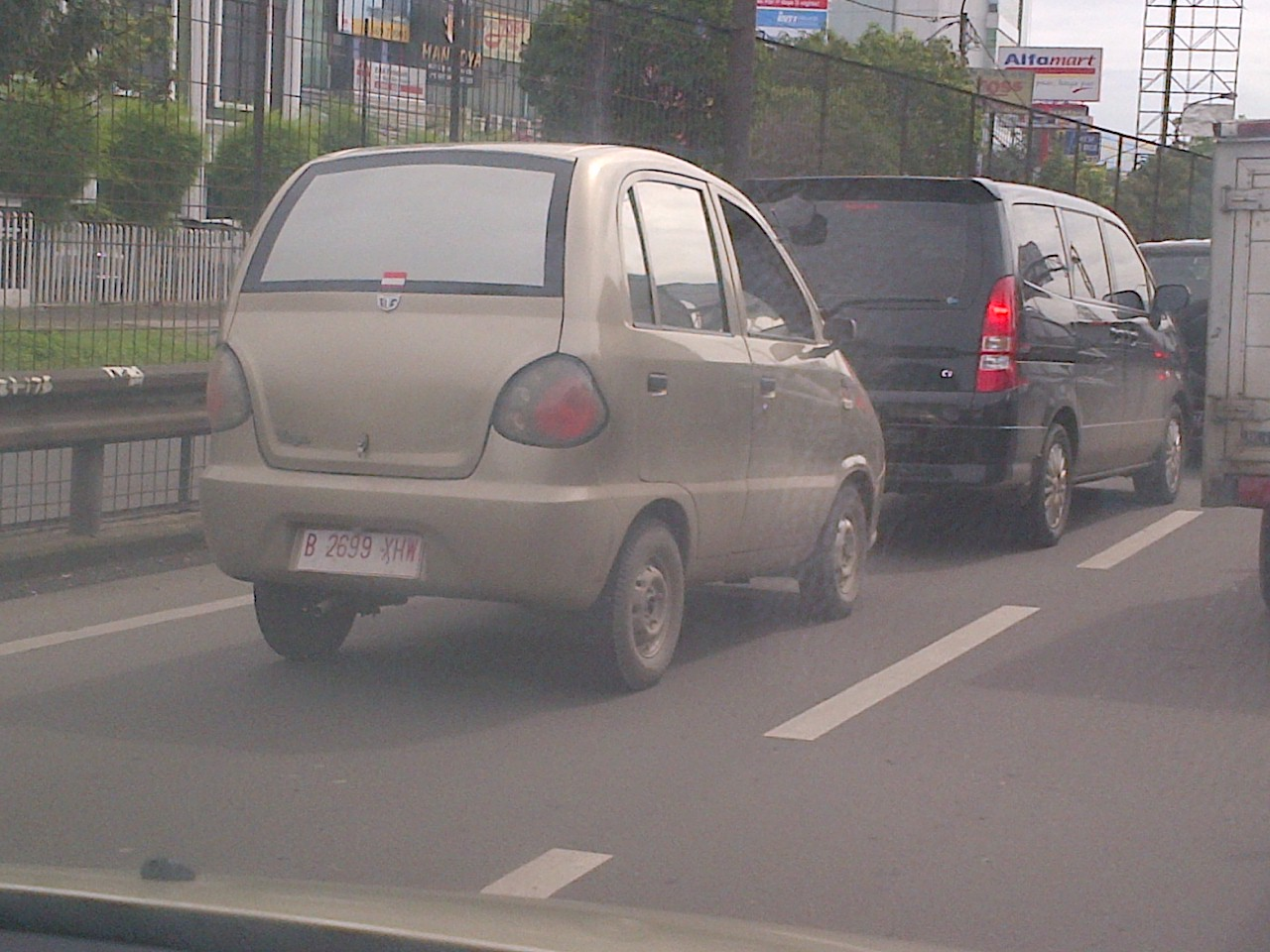

Overview
- Manufacturer: PT Super Gasindo Jaya
- Production: 2010–2017

Body and chassis
- Class: Mini car, Low Cost Green Car

The Tawon Car is a mini car, one of the Indonesian Low Cost Green Car. The naming comes from the philosophy of tawon (wasp), small but can sting like a bee. Wasp also diligently start to work in early morning.

== Uses ==
First generation

Overview
- Assembly: Indonesia

Body and chassis
- Body style: 4-door/>5-door hatchback

Powertrain
- Engine: 664cc L I2 (gasoline);valve gear overhead camshaft
- Transmission: chain transmission

Dimensions
- Wheelbase: 1,800 mm (70.9 in)
- Length: 3,100 mm (122.0 in)
- Width: 1,400 mm (55.1 in)
- Height: 1,720 mm (67.7 in)

Until end of 2010, most of Tawon cars are used as village public transport or taxis without argometer.

== Variants ==
At the end of 2010, the company launched Tawon Pickup with 500cc gasoline engine only. In 2013, all Tawon variants use 664cc 2 cylinders 4 stroke engine with gasoline or CNG. Except Chinese engine, all car components are made in Indonesia.

- Tawon Transformer, a pickup for 2 persons and 500 kilograms of goods
- Tawon AutoGas, a city car for 4 persons
- Metro Tawon, a hybrid wagon for carrying persons and goods
- Tawon Niga Taxi
- Health Care Go Around

== Asianusa ==
PT Super Gasindo Jaya is a member of Asianusa who use Chinese-produced engine, but all other contents is locally made. As of 2017, the only member of Asianusa in active production is PT Fin Komodo Technology, the others (including Tawon manufacturer) already bankrupt.

== See also ==
- Fin Komodo
- AMMDes
