= Fin Komodo Teknologi =

Indonesian automotive company

- Company type: Private (PT)
- Industry: Automotive
- Founded: 2004
- Founder: Ibnu Susilo
- Headquarters: Cimahi, West Java, Indonesia
- Area served: Indonesia
- Key people: Ibnu Susilo (CEO)
- Products: Automobiles
- Website: finkomodo.com

PT Fin Komodo Teknologi (shortened to PT FKT or simply FKT) is an Indonesian automotive manufacturer based in Cimahi, West Java.

== History ==
PT Fin Komodo Teknologi was founded by Mr. Ir. H. Ibnu Susilo in 2004. Previously he worked at IPTN (Industri Pesawat Terbang Nusantara) with several positions and responsibilities. Following positions and responsibilities that have been held by Ibnu Susilo:

- As a Design Integration Configurator for the N-250 aircraft.
- Advanced Technology Advisor, BPIS (Badan Pengelola Industri Strategis - Strategic Industry Management Agency) technology deputy
- Chief Engineer of Maleo national car design
- Head of the Master Dimension Definition Department, is responsible all forms of N-250 aircraft design
- Senior Manager for Business Unit Engineering & Technology - IAe
- Chairman, Innovation Group for Science Center Museum - PP-IPTEK Taman Mini Indonesia Indah

Because Indonesian government stopped stop committing to produce N-250, in 2004 he decided to leave IPTN and finally founded PT Fin Komodo Teknologi. FKT has been doing the design since 2005, but only commercialized in 2009 after going through various the trial phase, as well as the production of several generations. FKT produces Fin Komodo family of cruiser buggy.

FKT conducted market research in 2005, in 2006 began designing, and in 2007 started the production of the first generation. In 2008, FKT tested the first generation. Then they made improvement on the 2nd, 3rd and 4th generation of Fin Komodo cars in 2009, 2010, and 2011 respectively. Currently, FKT has developed the 5th generation.

In 2013, Ibnu Susilo as the chairman of Asianusa protested Government Regulation no. 41/2013 because it is considered deadly to national car project. The regulation makes the price of the Fin Komodo from Rp77 million to Rp123.2 million because it considers the Fin Komodo as a luxury vehicle and imposes a PPnBM (sales tax on luxury goods) of 60%. In addition, the Government also exempts PPnBM for Low Cost Green Car (LCGC), making foreign brand cars cheaper and reducing the national car market.

== Philosophy ==
The company name PT Fin Komodo Teknologi itself has a philosophy, namely:

=== Fin ===
It stands for Formulasi Indonesia (Indonesian Formulation) which means is Fin Komodo from the initial stage of idea, design to after sales using a formulation created by children Indonesia, is not a license or a copy of technology from other companies / countries.

=== Komodo ===
The animal name Komodo (Varanus Komodoensis) was chosen because Komodo dragons are endemic to Indonesia, do not exist in other countries, and equated mentions around the world.

=== Technology ===
Is part of the company's vision, which is in the future It is hoped that Fin Komodo Teknologi can build as well Indonesian technology culture, not just automotive building culture only.

== Awards and recognition ==
FKT's product, Fin Komodo family of vehicles, has received several awards:

1. On July 29, 2010 Markplus in collaboration with Marketeers magazine awarded the Marketeers Award Editor's Choice to several contestants and supporters of the 2010 Indonesia International Motor Show (IIMS) event in Kemayoran Jakarta. One of these appreciations was given by the Marketeers Award (Editors Choice) for PT Fin Komodo Technology, as The New Wave Commercialization Car.
2. The 2011 Indonesian Innovation Appreciation is an appreciation for those who have many services and roles in strengthening the National Innovation System (SIN) at the regional level. One of these appreciations was given to PT FIN Komodo Technology, as a Technopreunership Award (New/Beginner MSMEs).
3. IKA ITS Business Summit (IBS) 2012 is an event that presents national figures, business people, and ITS alumni held annually by the Central Management of the ITS Alumni Association (PP IKA ITS) and the Sepuluh Nopember Institute of Technology Surabaya (ITS Surabaya). At the close of IBS 2012, Ir. H Ibnu Susilo received the Life Time Achievement Awards: The Most Inspirational & Innovative CEO 2012 for designing and producing the FIN Komodo Offroad Utility Vehicle.
4. The Government gives appreciation to industries/companies that have pioneered and succeeded in developing technology in the industrial sector in the form of the Industrial Technology Pioneering Award (RINTEK). PT Fin Komodo Technology was awarded the 1st Champion of Technology Pioneers 2012 which was handed over by the President of the Republic of Indonesia Susilo Bambang Yudhoyono at the State Palace.
5. 2017 is the 10th (ten) award for BPPT to confer the Bacharuddin Jusuf Habibie Technology Award (BJHTA). This award is given to technology actors who are meritorious, achievers, and are dedicated to the Indonesian nation and state in innovation and creativity to produce real works of technology in their respective fields. The award was given to Ir. H. Ibnu Susilo for Fin Komodo as the creator of Locally Made Off-Road Cars.
6. Ten November Award of The Sepuluh Nopember Institute of Technology (ITS) Surabaya gives awards to people who have contributed to ITS. The award was given by the ITS Chancellor, Prof. Ir. Joni Hermana, M.Sc. Ph. D on the 57th Anniversary of ITS at Grha Ten November ITS. One of the awards was given to Ir. H. Ibnu Susilo for showing real work that is useful for the community.
7. The Indonesia Good Design Selection (IGDS) award is the highest award for the best industrial product design given by the government through the Ministry of Industry to industrial product designers and/or industrial companies. At the event g Fin Komodo KD 250 X received the highest award in the Design Product category at the IGDS 2020 event. It received the IGDS 2020 Grand Award certificate for the Design Product category.

== See also ==
- KMWI
- Esemka
- Viar Motor Indonesia
