= Viar Motor Indonesia =

Indonesian automotive company

PT Triangle Motorindo
- Type: Private (PT)
- Traded as: Viar Motor Indonesia
- Industry: Automotive
- Founded: 2000
- Headquarters: Semarang, Central Java, Indonesia
- Area served: Indonesia (mainly), worldwide
- Products: Motorcycles, commercial vehicles, off-road vehicles
- Website: www.viarmotor.com

PT Triangle Motorindo is a private Indonesian automotive manufacturer based in Semarang, Central Java. Its trade name is Viar Motor Indonesia or simply Viar. The main products of Viar are motor trikes, scooter motorcycles, underbone motorcycles, sport bikes, electric motorbikes, motocross, and all-terrain vehicles.

== History ==
PT Triangle Motorindo was founded in February 2000 and started to import Taiwanese motorcycle in CBU (Completely Built-Up) scheme in July 2000. In July 2001, CKD (Completely Knocked-Down) assembly begins. In October 2001, Viar Taiwan Motorcycle project Apollo generation begins, the assembly is carried out by IKD (Incompletely Knocked-Down) scheme using Taiwan engine components and assisted by experts from Taiwan. In June 2003, the phase II integrated plant was officially operational and the Viar Speed generation went into production. The use of local components is increasingly encouraged. Phase III of the integrated plant was completed in July 2007 and continued with the development of production lines, QC, R&B, and Engineering Technology for the future production. In July of the same year, the construction of the integrated factory Phase IV begins with preparations for the construction of a modern and integrated automotive industrial area. The amount of phase IV investment is 20 million USD. In May 2011 the factory at Bukit Semarang Baru officially started operating. The entire production process is carried out in the newest factory. The integrated development of Phase V of warehouse expansion (north part) for spare parts and finished units storage was carried out in June 2013.

Currently, Viar exports motorcycles abroad, such as countries in Africa, the Caribbean, Southeast Asia, Yemen, Nicaragua, El Salvador and Oceania.

== Facilities ==
Viar has 2 production facilities:

- Factory I (Terboyo Industrial Park): The first factory was established in December 2000 in the Terboyo Industrial area, Semarang. Here the production system that started from CBU (Completely Built-Up) increased to CKD (Completely Knocked-Down). Each month, this factory is capable of producing as many as 25,000 units.
- Factory II (Bukit Semarang Baru): Established in mid 2007 and officially operating in 2011, which replaced the previous factory. It is at this factory that this product becomes an automotive company from Indonesia that assembles its own production. This factory has the latest equipment and supplies in the automotive industry in Indonesia and became the first motorcycle factory in Indonesia to produce its own original spare parts.

== Models ==
- Viar Apollo
- Viar Vix R
- Viar Vior 125
- Viar Vortex 250
- Viar Karya/Viar Cargo/Viar Triton
- Viar Karya BIT 100/Viar Mini Cargo/Viar Mini Triton
- Viar Cross X
- Viar Cross X 100 Mini Trail
- Viar Cross X 200 GT
- Viar Razor/Viar Bulldog
- Viar Vintech/Viar Wildcat
- Viar Star NX/Viar Pegasus
- Viar Akasha/Viar Astro
- Viar Uno
- Viar Panama/Viar Milano
- Viar Orion
- Viar Caraka/Viar Urbano
- Viar Q1 Electric Motorcycle

== See also ==
- WIKA Industri Manufaktur
- Esemka
- Fin Komodo Teknologi
- KMWI
