= AMMDes =

Indonesian agricultural vehicle

Alat Mekanis Multiguna Pedesaan
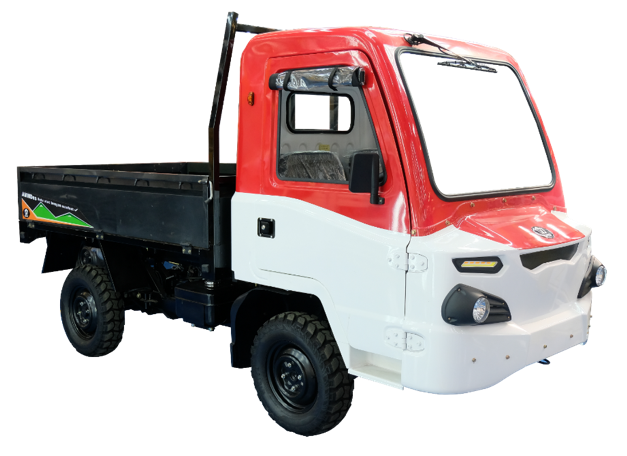
- Basic version of AMMDes with a 3-way cargo bed door

Overview
- Type: Rural car
- Manufacturer: PT Kreasi Mandiri Wintor Indonesia
- Production: 2018–present

Body and chassis
- Body style: 2-door pickup with middle engine
- Chassis: Ladder frame

Powertrain
- Engine: G650 W 1 cylinder 650 cc Diesel engine
- Transmission: Manual 3 forward speed 1 reverse speed

Dimensions
- Wheelbase: 1.9 m
- Length: 3.62 m
- Width: 1.5 m
- Height: 2 m
- Curb weight: 768 kg

AMMDes (short for Alat Mekanis Multiguna Pedesaan—lit. Rural Multipurpose Mechanical Tool) is an agricultural vehicle produced by PT Kreasi Mandiri Wintor Indonesia (KMWI). This vehicle is categorized as rural car. The price of the base model is Rp70 million (US$4900 as of June 2020), not including the equipment it carries. The cheapest equipment price is the irrigation pump (Rp4 million) and the most expensive is the water purifier (Rp40–120 million, depending on the water quality and capacity). The certification carried out by the Ministry of Industry and PT Surveyor Indonesia denotes that the AMMDes has a TKDN (Tingkat Komponen Dalam Negeri — Domestic Component Level) of 40.92%.

== Production ==
The Indonesian Ministry of Industry's Rural Car Program collaborated with PT KMWI to make the AMMDes prototype in 2018, and by 2019 mass production has begun. AMMDes itself was first launched through the 2018 GIIAS (Gaikindo Indonesia International Auto Show) event. In 2019 KMWI had a production capacity of 3,000 units per year. It was planned that the capability will be increased to 12,000 units per year in 2020. After the cancellation of Klaten production plant, AMMDes is currently produced at a rate of 3,000 units per year.

== Features ==
AMMDes is equipped with a power take-off system to transmit power from the car to other machines. The basic version is a pickup car, which can be equipped with a 3-door tub. The rear tire is equipped with an anti-slip system (differential lock system) to facilitate driving through muddy areas. AMMDes carrying capacity is 700kg. The engine is made in India, the 650 cc 1-cylinder G650 W 1 diesel engine with 14hp/3000 rpm power and 35 Nm/1800-2200rpm torque, while the gearbox is made in Taiwan, manual 3 forward speed and 1 reverse speed. The fuel tank capacity is 15 liters. The AMMDes is a rear wheel drive vehicle, the front suspension is a double wishbone suspension while the rear suspension is a trailing arm type. AMMDes has a ground clearance of 180mm (7in) and a turning radius of 4m. The maximum speed is 32 km/h, with a maximum gradeability of 18°.

== See also ==
- Fin Komodo (ATV)
- Kei car
- Panda car
