= Rural car (Indonesia) =

Indonesian vehicle class

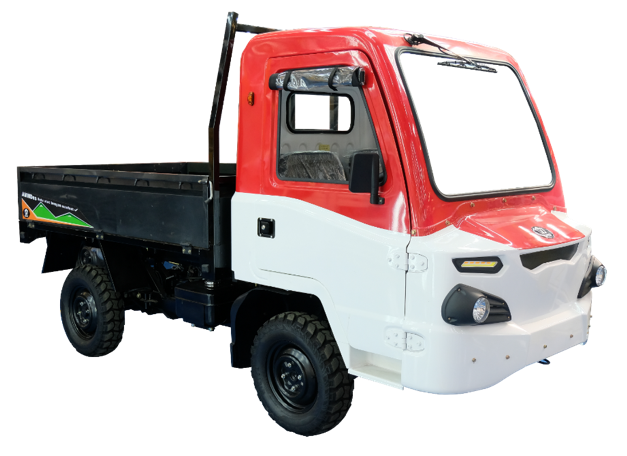
AMMDes made by PT. KMWI (2018–present)

The rural car (Indonesian: mobil pedesaan), also known as the village car (mobil desa), is a group of cars commonly found in Indonesia.

The rural car appeared after the second reshuffle of Joko Widodo's cabinet in July 2016, when Airlangga Hartarto was appointed Minister of Industry and was tasked by the President to develop the Small Medium Enterprises (SMEs) project and rural cars.

The program was initiated by the Ministry of Industry together with the Indonesian Automotive Institute (IOI). The fixed price for a rural car is around Rp 60–Rp 80 million, which is less expensive than similar vehicles in this class. They can only be used on off-road pathways and village roads outside the toll road.

These rural vehicles are designed to facilitate community activities, mainly being a means of transporting agricultural and plantation products.

== Specifications ==
The Ministry of Industry defines rural cars as those that meet the following specifications:

1. The form does not intersect with the vehicle of that era. Assuming dimensions of length × width × height (3.2 m (10 ft) × 1.5 m (4.9 ft) × 1.8 m (5.9 ft) plus trailer).
2. Vehicle configuration can be 4×4 or 4×2.
3. Diesel engine with a capacity of 1,000 cc, can be powered by biofuel (biodiesel).
4. Vehicle speed of 50 km/h (31 mph).
5. The retail price is around Rp 60 million on the road.
6. Vehicles with simple maintenance concepts and systems.
7. The design or shape of the body and cabin has a characteristic or patterned local wisdom.
8. The vehicle platform uses frames that are simple and easily assembled.
9. The body and cabin are easy to disassemble and are made from local materials that must be both lightweight and strong.
10. Minimum ground clearance of 200 mm (7.9 in).
11. In general, this vehicle is easily assembled.
12. The vehicle shape design must be multipurpose (for agriculture, plantations, animal husbandry, irrigation, fisheries, fishermen, etc.).
13. As a means of transporting people and goods.

== See also ==
- Low cost green car
- Kei car
- Panda car
