= Maruti Suzuki Wagon R =

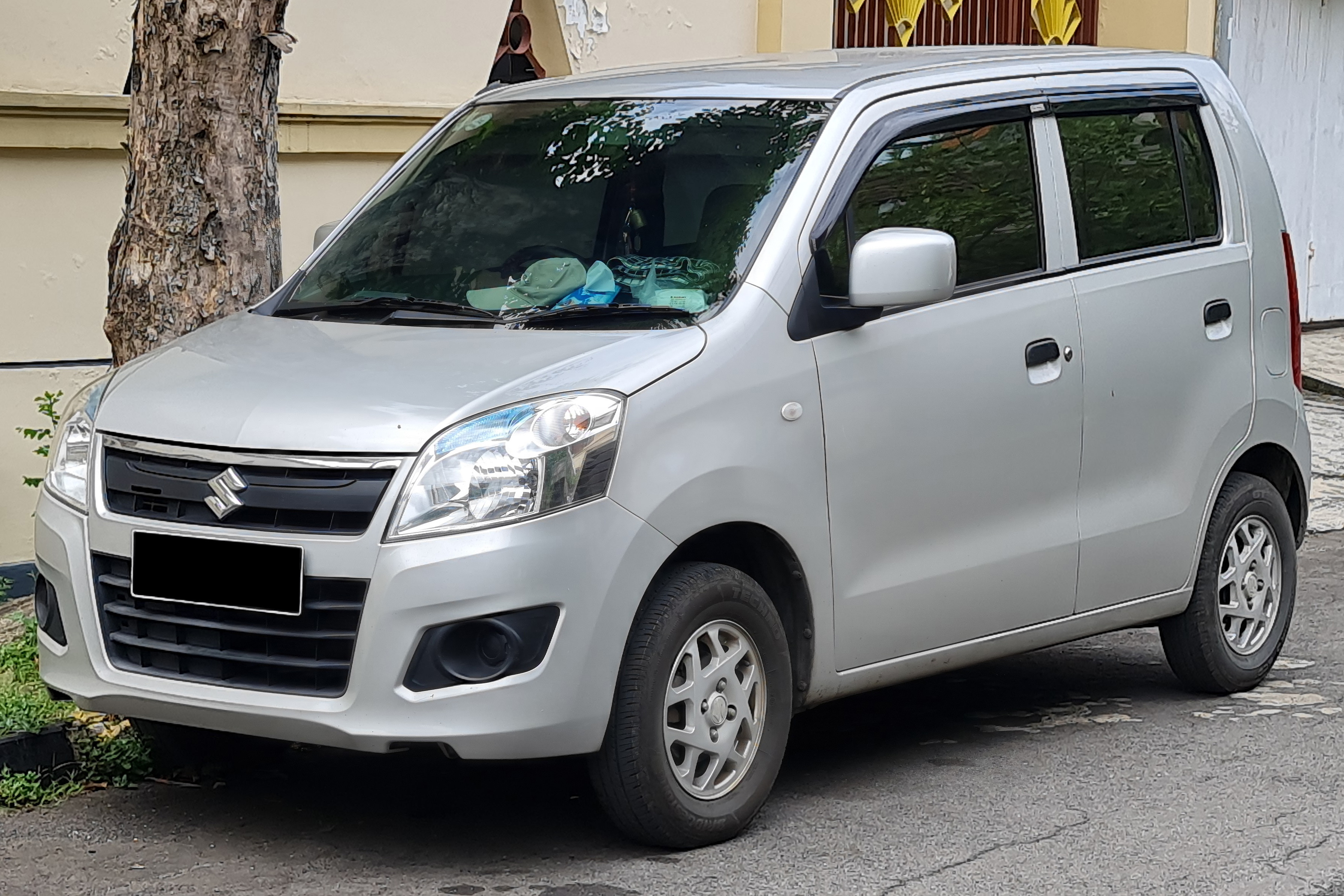
- 2018 Suzuki Karimun Wagon R GL (MP31S, Indonesia)

Overview
- Manufacturer: Suzuki
- Also called: Suzuki Wagon R; Suzuki Karimun Wagon R (Indonesia, 2013–2021)
- Production: 1999–present

Body and chassis
- Class: City car/Mini MPV
- Body style: 5-door hatchback
- Layout: Front-engine, front-wheel-drive

The Maruti Suzuki Wagon R (or WagonR) is a city car/mini MPV manufactured and marketed by Suzuki through its subsidiary Maruti Suzuki primarily for the Indian market since 1999. The Wagon R was launched in India on 18 December 1999, and has since undergone several upgrades. The second-generation Wagon R model and styling was also shared with the Karimun Wagon R for the Indonesian market and the Wagon R for the Pakistani market, despite several differences.

While initially the Maruti-built Wagon R shared its platform from the Japanese market Wagon R kei car, the third generation Maruti-built Wagon R is unrelated with the later versions of the Wagon R sold in Japan. Instead, the car was built from ground up above the HEARTECT platform.

The Wagon R built in India is also exported to several neighbouring countries, including Bangladesh, Bhutan, Nepal and Sri Lanka, dropping the "Maruti" moniker.

As of December 2024, the Wagon R has been sold over 3.2 million units in India.

== First generation (1999) ==
First generation
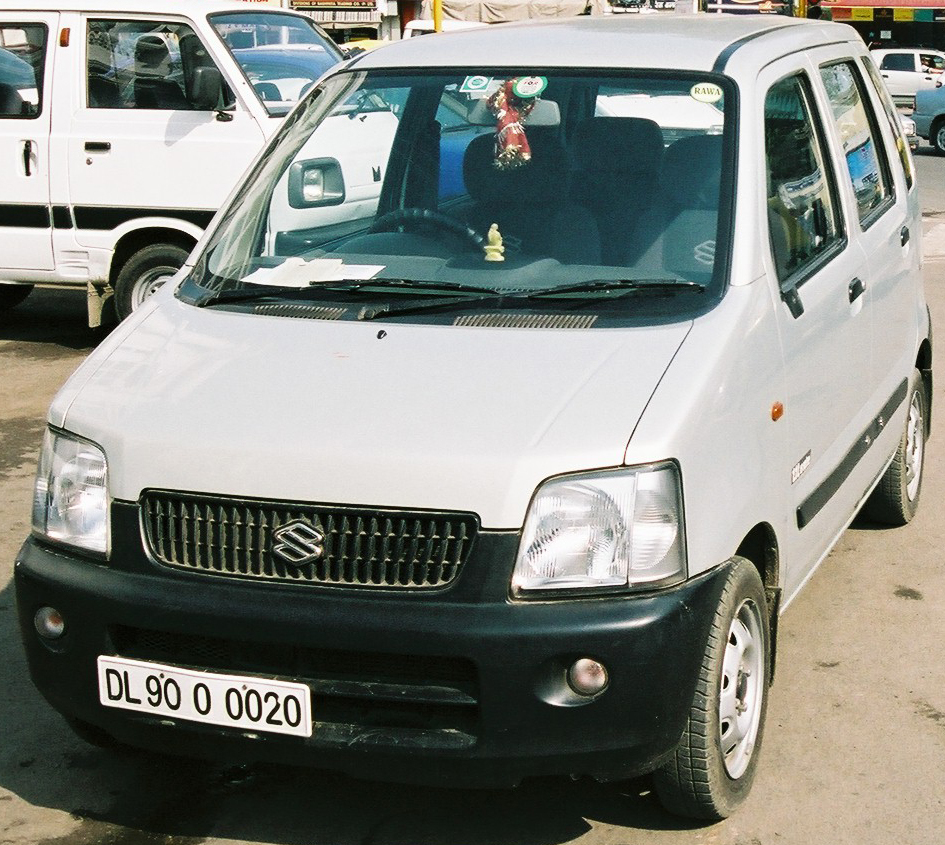
- 2000 Maruti Suzuki Wagon R LX

Overview
- Also called: Suzuki Wagon R
- Production: 1999–2009
- Assembly: India: Gurgaon, Haryana (Maruti Suzuki)

Body and chassis
- Related: Suzuki Wagon R (MC)

Powertrain
- Engine: 1.1 L F10D 16V I4 (petrol)
- Transmission: 5-speed manual; 3-speed automatic

Dimensions
- Wheelbase: 2,360 mm (92.9 in)
- Length: 3,520–3,595 mm (138.6–141.5 in)
- Width: 1,475–1,490 mm (58.1–58.7 in)
- Height: 1,660 mm (65.4 in)
- Curb weight: 755–860 kg (1,664–1,896 lb)

The first generation Wagon R was introduced in India on 18 December 1999. Based on the Wagon R kei car offered in Japan, the Wagon R was an answer to the then newly arrived Hyundai Santro. The Wagon R quickly gained popularity in the country as the car came with much interior space, including the ability to seat even taller passengers with ease. The car also offered features like power windows and power steering, which back in 1999 were considered luxuries in India. The car is powered by Suzuki's 1.1-litre F10D petrol engine producing 64 bhp (48 kW) at 6,200 rpm and 84 N⋅m (62 lb⋅ft) of torque at 3,500 rpm.

A minor facelift of this model was introduced in 2004 which received a chrome line in the grille, body-coloured bumpers and clear-lens tail lamps. Inside, the Wagon R has a beige dashboard with many storage spaces. In 2006, Suzuki launched an LPG version called DUO, which was introduced for the F10D engined variants. This gave owners an option of running on petrol and/or LPG. The car also received aesthetic overhauls with a redesigned grille and tailgate, including accents of chrome.

Around 880,000 units were sold of the first generation Maruti Suzuki Wagon R.

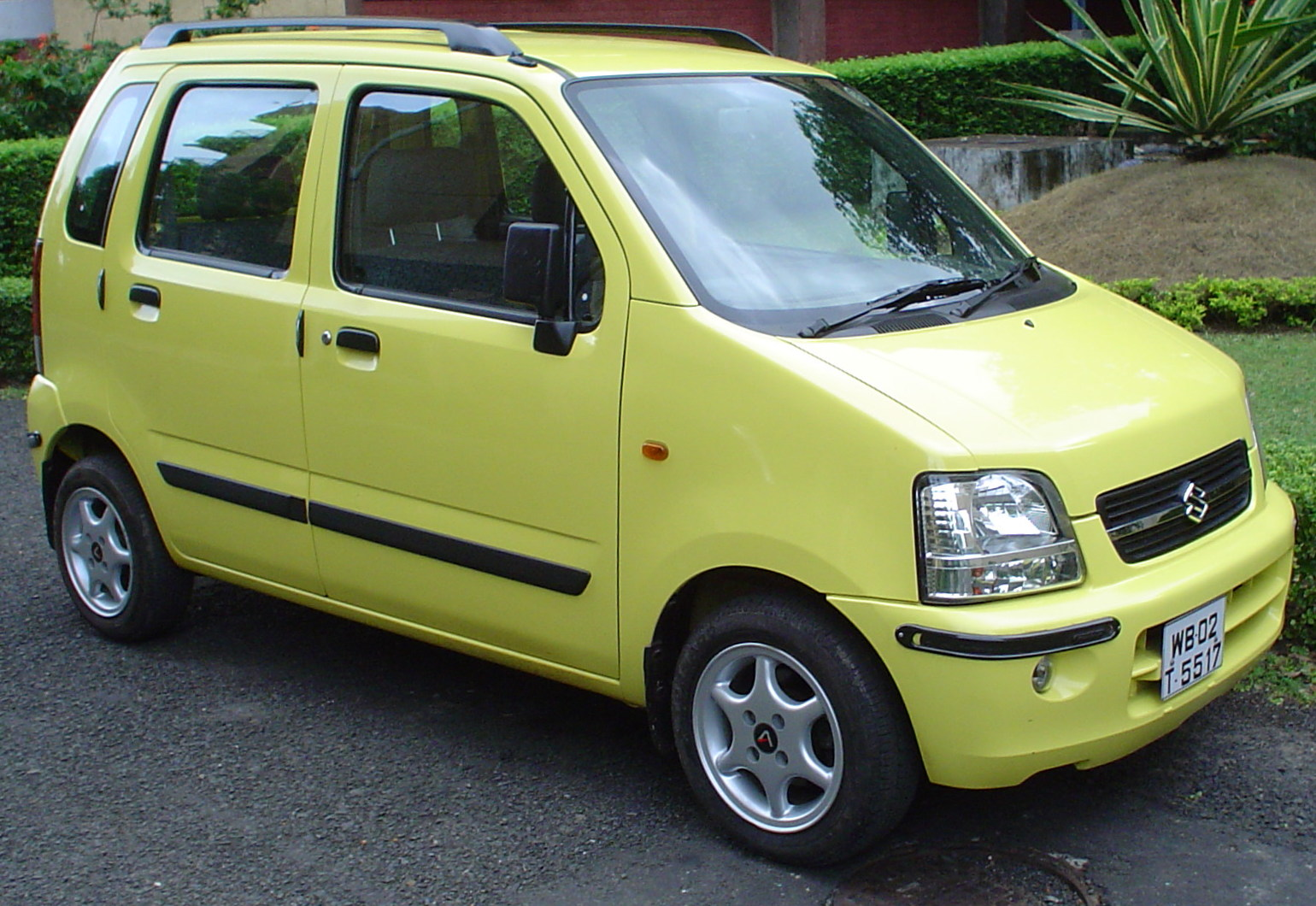
Maruti Suzuki Wagon R VX (first facelift)

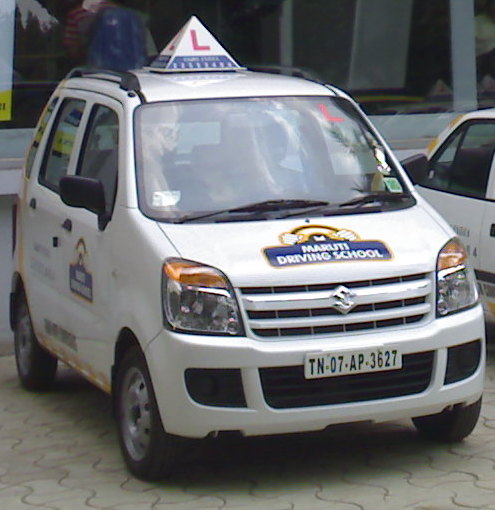
Maruti Suzuki Wagon R LX (second facelift)

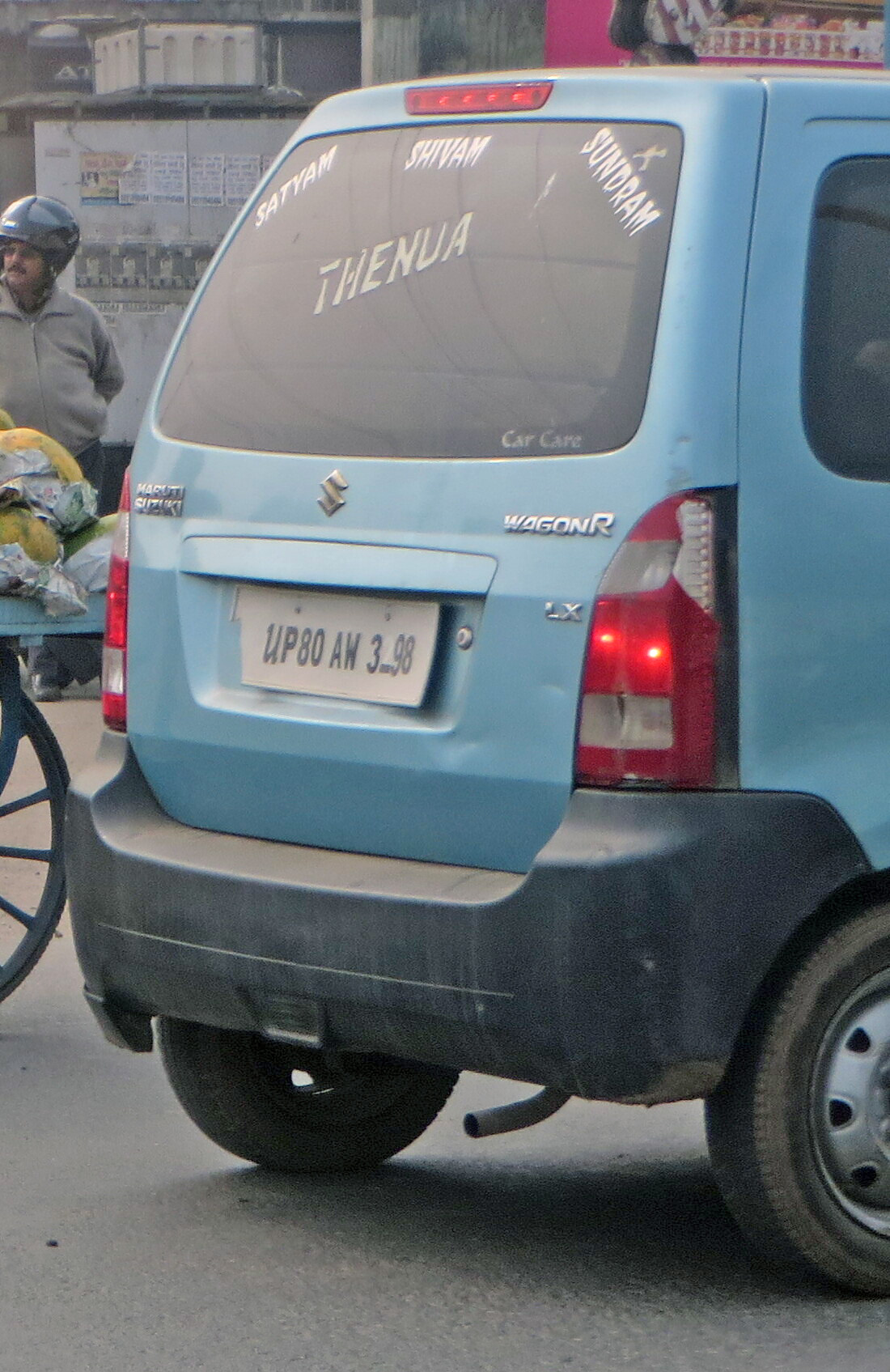
Maruti Suzuki Wagon R LX (second facelift)

== Second generation (MP31S; 2010) ==
Second generation
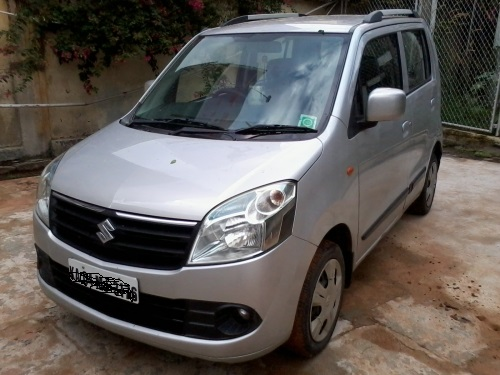
- Maruti Suzuki Wagon R VXi (pre-facelift)

Overview
- Model code: MP31S
- Also called: Suzuki Wagon R; Suzuki Karimun Wagon R (Indonesia)
- Production: 2010–2019 (India); 2013–2021 (Indonesia); 2014–2025 (Pakistan)
- Assembly: India: Gurgaon, Haryana (Maruti Suzuki); Indonesia: Tambun, Bekasi (Suzuki Indomobil Motor) (Karimun Wagon R); Pakistan: Karachi (Pak Suzuki Motors)

Body and chassis
- Related: Suzuki Wagon R (MH23S)

Powertrain
- Engine: 1.0 L K10B 12V I3 (Petrol/CNG)
- Transmission: 5-speed manual; 3-speed automatic (India); 5-speed AMT

Dimensions
- Wheelbase: 2,400 mm (94.5 in)
- Length: 3,600–3,635 mm (141.7–143.1 in)
- Width: 1,475 mm (58.1 in)
- Height: 1,660–1,700 mm (65.4–66.9 in)
- Curb weight: 810–965 kg (1,786–2,127 lb)

Chronology
- Predecessor: Suzuki Karimun Estilo (Indonesia)
- Successor: Suzuki S-Presso (Indonesia)

The second generation Wagon R was introduced on 23 April 2010 in New Delhi, India. Featuring a brand-new platform carried from the fourth generation Japanese Wagon R, the overall length of the second generation Wagon R was increased to 3,595 mm (an increase of 75 mm) with a wheelbase of 2,400 mm. The width and height were mostly unchanged. While safety enhancements have been implemented in the form of ABS, airbags and fog lamps, these are limited only to the top variant. The trim levels available are LX, LXi and VXi.

The Indian model (2010) called Wagon R 1.0, is powered by the more efficient three-cylinder 998 cc K10B engine, which can also be found in the Maruti Suzuki A-Star, Maruti Suzuki Estilo, and the Maruti Suzuki Alto K10. The engine delivers 68 PS (50 kW; 67 hp) at 6,200 rpm, and 90 N⋅m (66 lb⋅ft) at 3 500 rpm. Maruti Suzuki launched a new 5-speed vehicle with the same engine and the same body. This version came only in the top model that is the VXi which had ABS as standard. Also, Maruti launched ABS as an option for all Wagon R and Stingray variants. The Wagon R was priced at 4.14 lakh Indian rupees or INR, while Stingray is priced INR 20,000 more than the Wagon R.

The first facelift for this generation arrived on 14 January 2013. It featured cosmetic changes, including a narrower grille, restyled bumpers with larger vents and a new fog lamp housing. Inside, changes included the dual glove box and an integrated Eagle Wings music system with integrated USB and AUX ports.

In 2014, Maruti Suzuki introduced the Maruti Suzuki Wagon R Stingray. It was essentially a restyled second generation Wagon R and it was introduced alongside the regular version. The Stingray features a bolder, dynamic looking fascia. It featured projector headlamps, a first for the segment. Later on, Maruti Suzuki dropped the Stingray moniker and renamed it as Wagon R VXi+ as the top variant of the range.

In 2015, a 5-speed automated gear shift (AGS, or AMT) was introduced to replace the aging 3-speed automatic transmission.

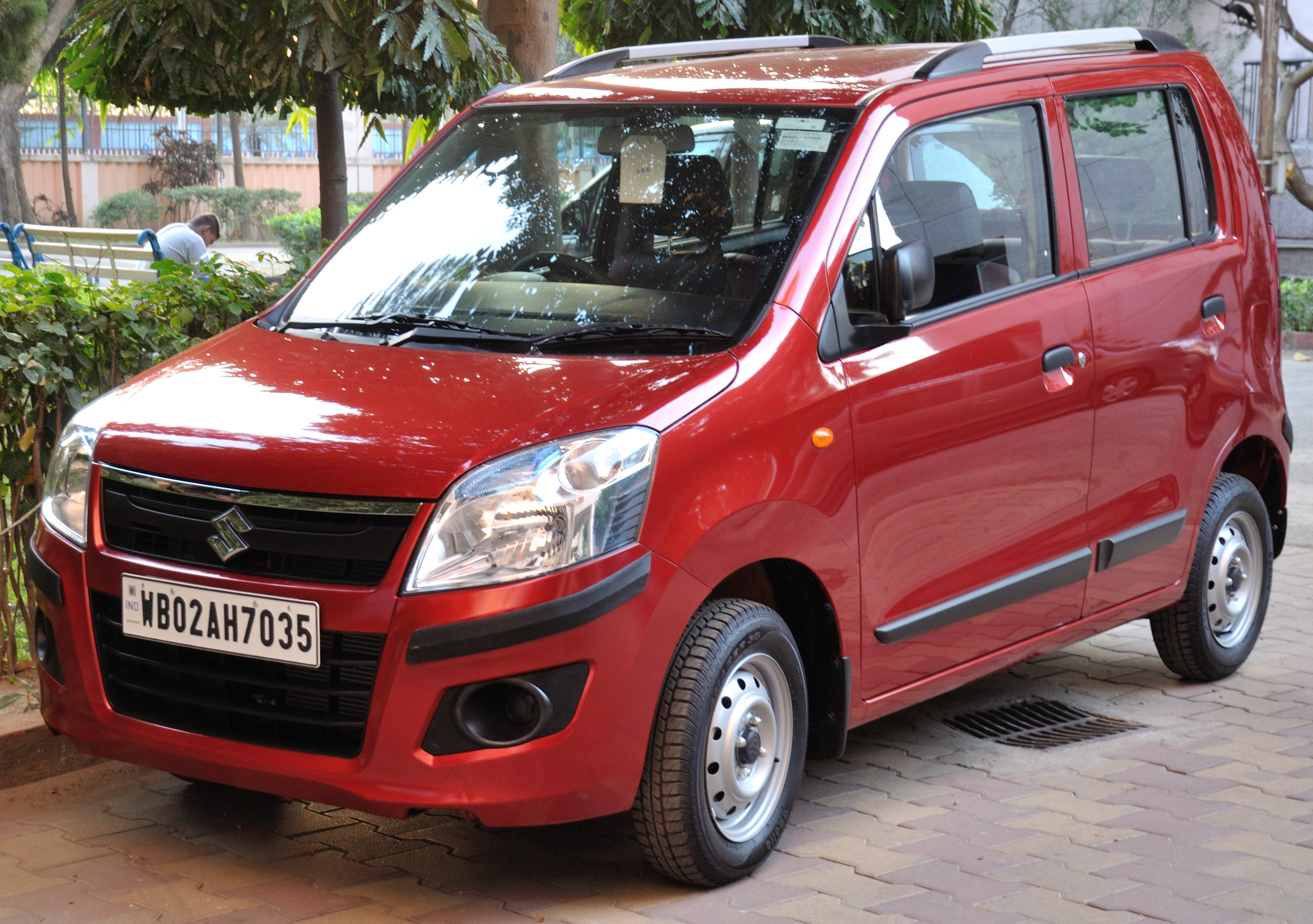
Maruti Suzuki Wagon R LXi (MP31S, facelift)

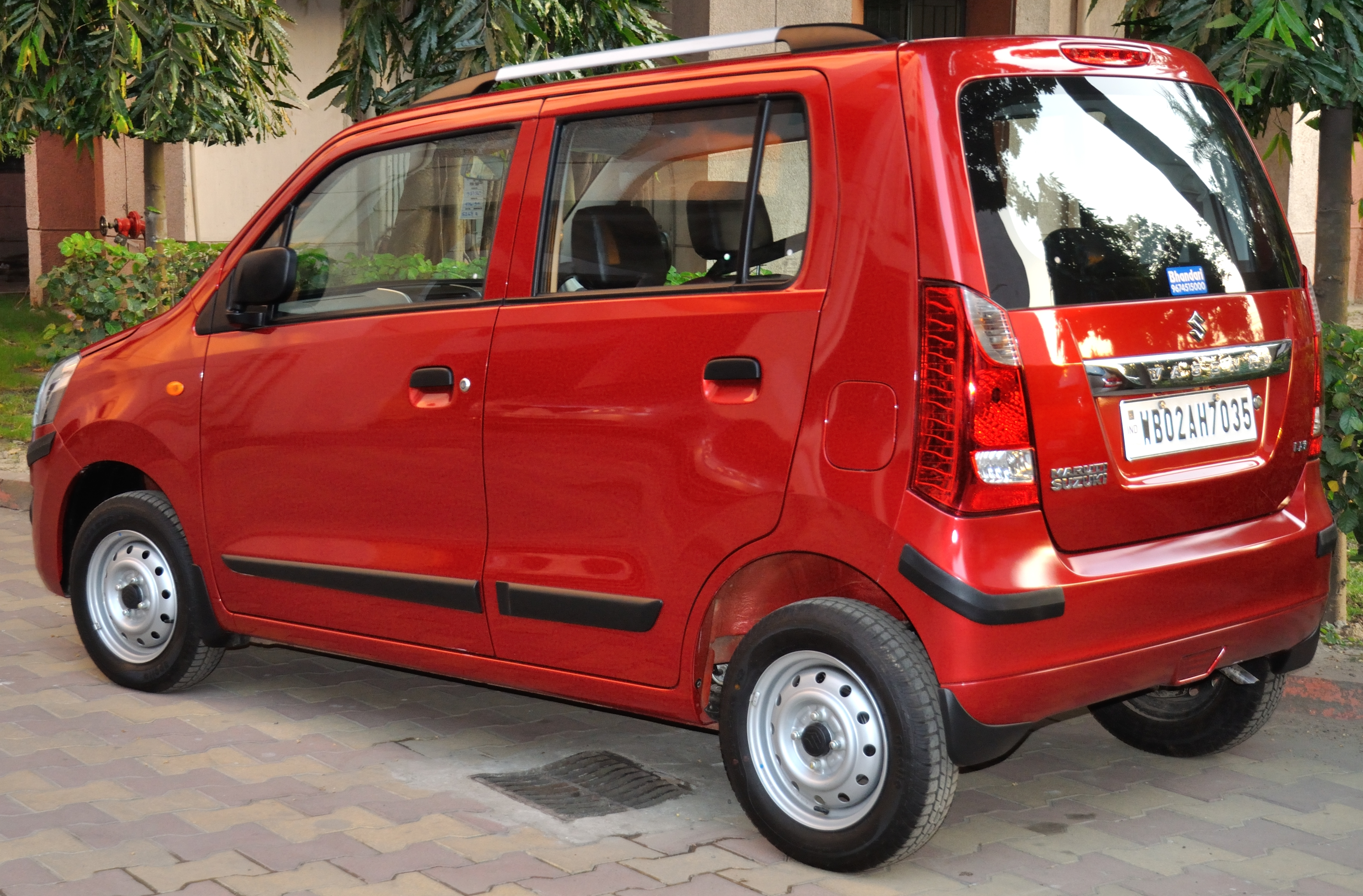
Maruti Suzuki Wagon R LXi (MP31S, facelift)

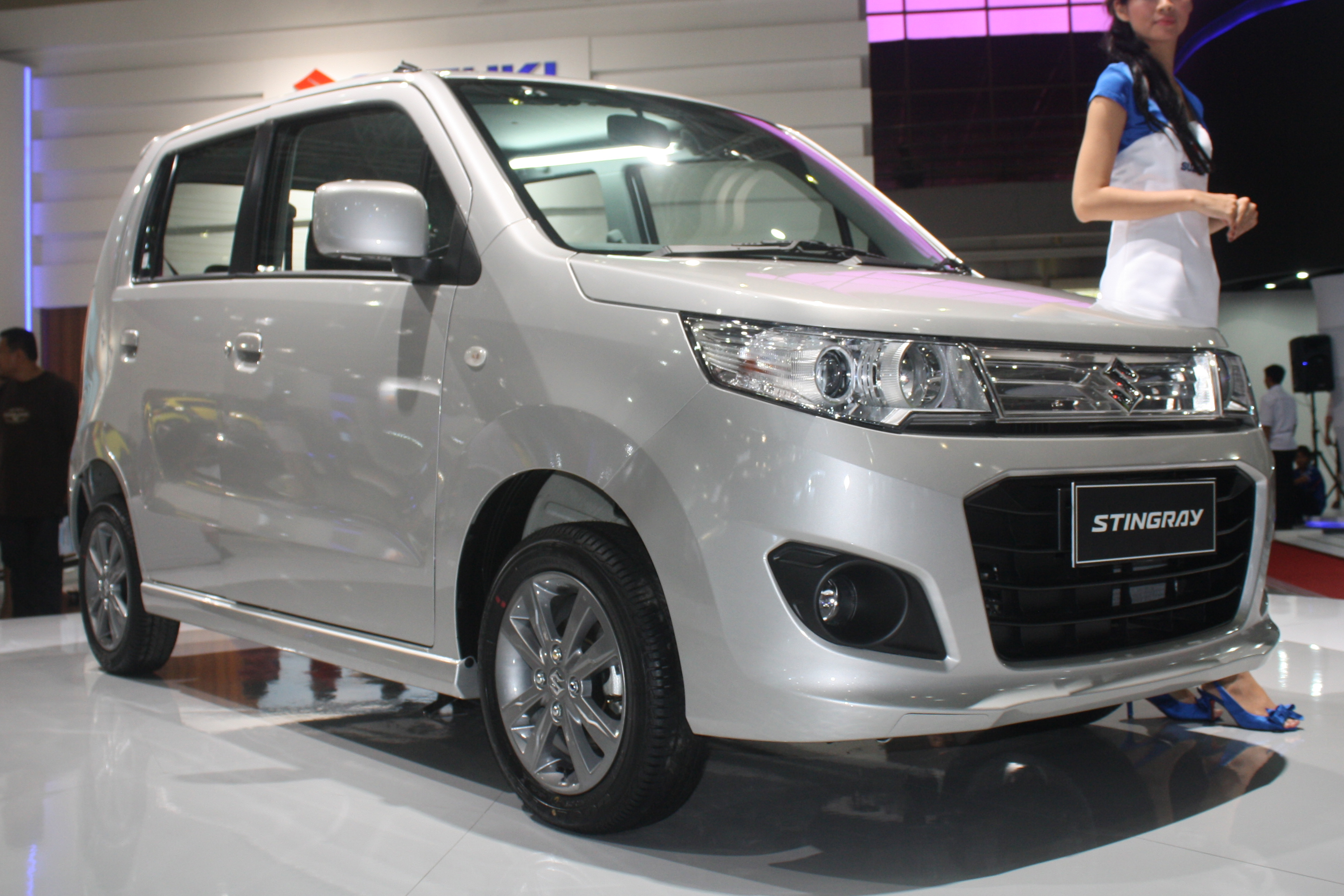
2013 Maruti Suzuki Wagon R Stingray VXi (MP31S)

=== Karimun Wagon R ===
The Karimun Wagon R is a rebadged version of the Indian Wagon R to suit the Indonesian government's Low Cost Green Car (LCGC) policy. It was unveiled in its final production form in September 2013 at the 21st Indonesia International Motor Show. Production begun in September 2013 at the Tambun Plant for domestic market and was available to the market in October 2013. It was initially available in three trim levels: GA, GL and GX. The Dilago trim level (based on GL trim with sporty bodykit and additional accessories, positioned above GX trim) went on sale later in June 2014 and discontinued in late 2015. The "Dilago" name was taken from a native Moluccas word meaning "to be the best".

The sportier version based on the Indian Wagon R Stingray, called the Karimun Wagon R GS, was launched in September 2014. A 5-speed automated gear shift (AGS) variant appeared later in May 2015. The Karimun Wagon R received an update in April 2017 at the 25th Indonesia International Motor Show, and is available in GA, GL and GS trim levels. The car is also available with a by-order blind van variant based on GA and GS trims. A limited edition called 50th Anniversary Edition was launched in October 2020, basically the GS version of the previous 2014 GL Dilago special edition. This model was launched to celebrate 50 years of Suzuki Indomobil's presence in Indonesia.

The Indonesian-made Wagon R is essentially a stripped-down version of the Indian Wagon R. The differences with the Indian Wagon R are the absence of a high-mounted stop lamp, rear fog lamp, rear wiper, rear washer, defoggers, electric mirrors, "Wagon R" lettering on the rear chrome garnish, mirror on the passenger's sun visor, day/night view center mirror, fabric door trims, rear power windows, adjustable head rests, 60:40 split back seat, tilt steering, upper front passenger glove box (on the single airbag variant), front passenger airbag, ABS, driver side cup holder, headlamp levelling adjuster, boot parcel tray, CNG variant, a simpler HVAC system and adjustments, and the presence of a Garuda-inspired emblem to comply with Low Cost Green Car (LCGC) tax incentive regulations.

In May 2017, the Karimun Wagon R received a minor facelift. Features a revised grille, new alloy wheels design, and the Garuda-inspired emblem was replaced with the Suzuki emblem. The GX trim was discontinued.

The Karimun Wagon R was discontinued in Indonesia in late 2021, while knock-down kit exports to Pakistan continued till 2025.

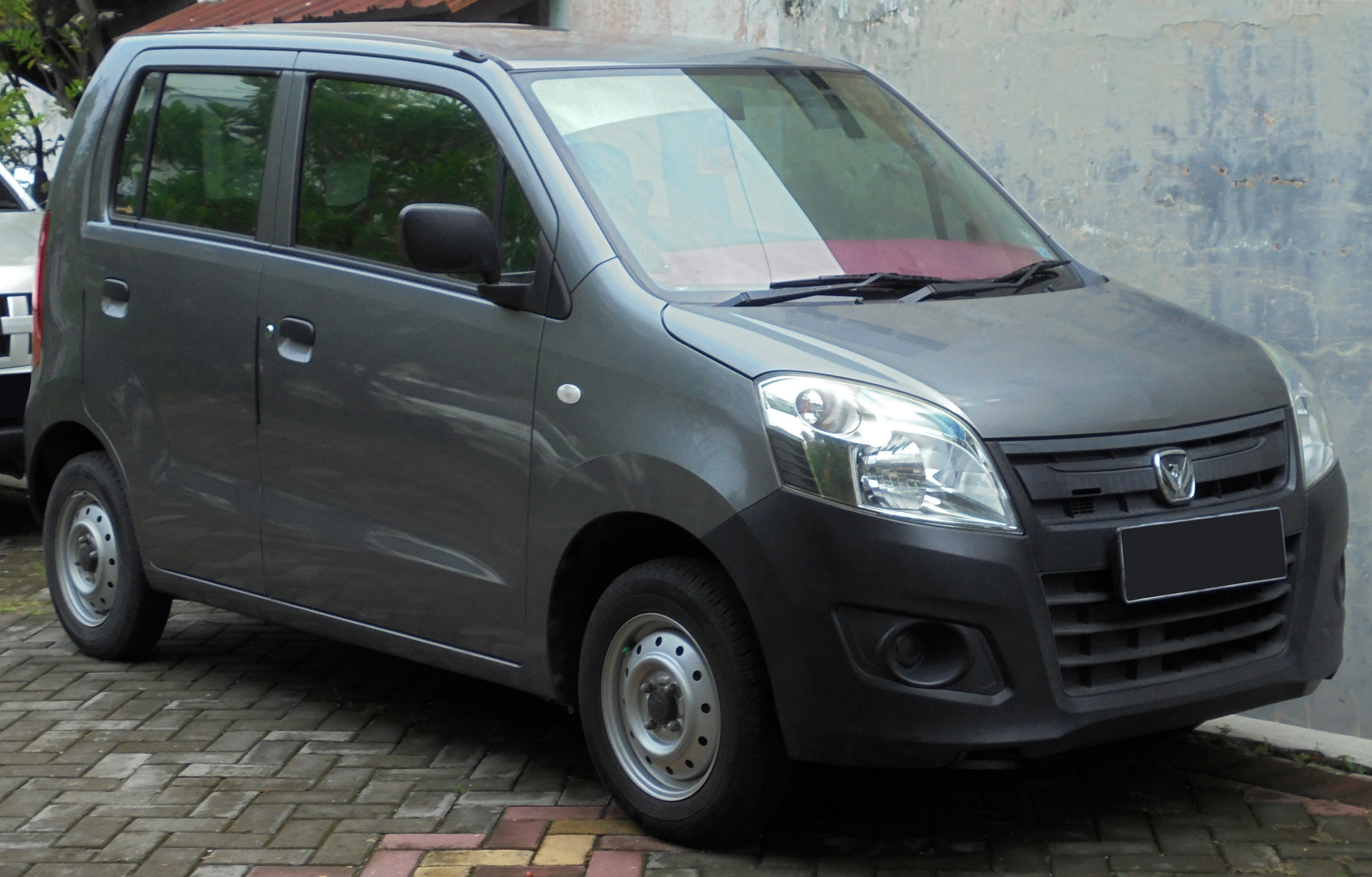
2014 Suzuki Karimun Wagon R GA (MP31S, Indonesia)

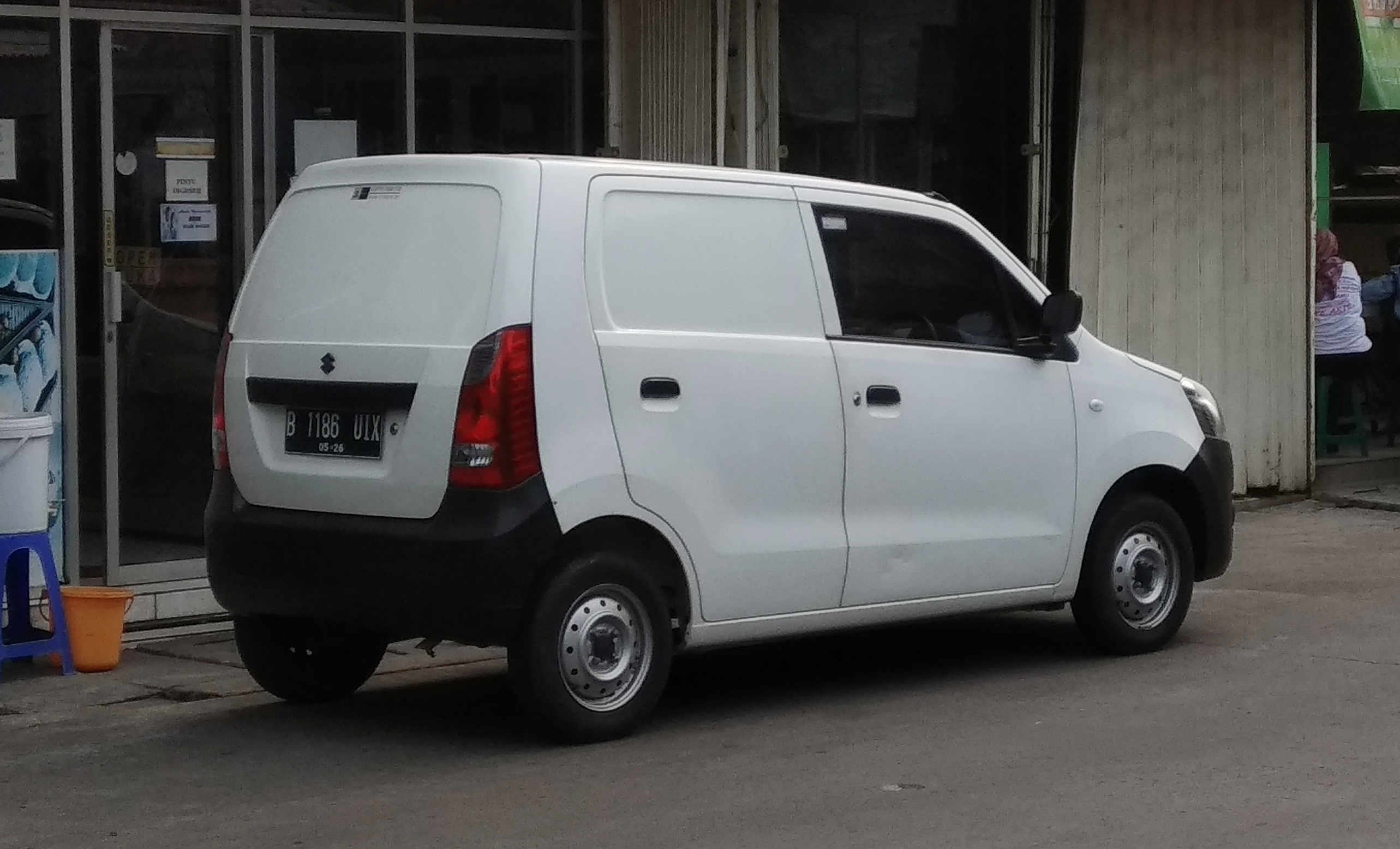
2015 Suzuki Karimun Wagon R GA panel van (MP31S, Indonesia)

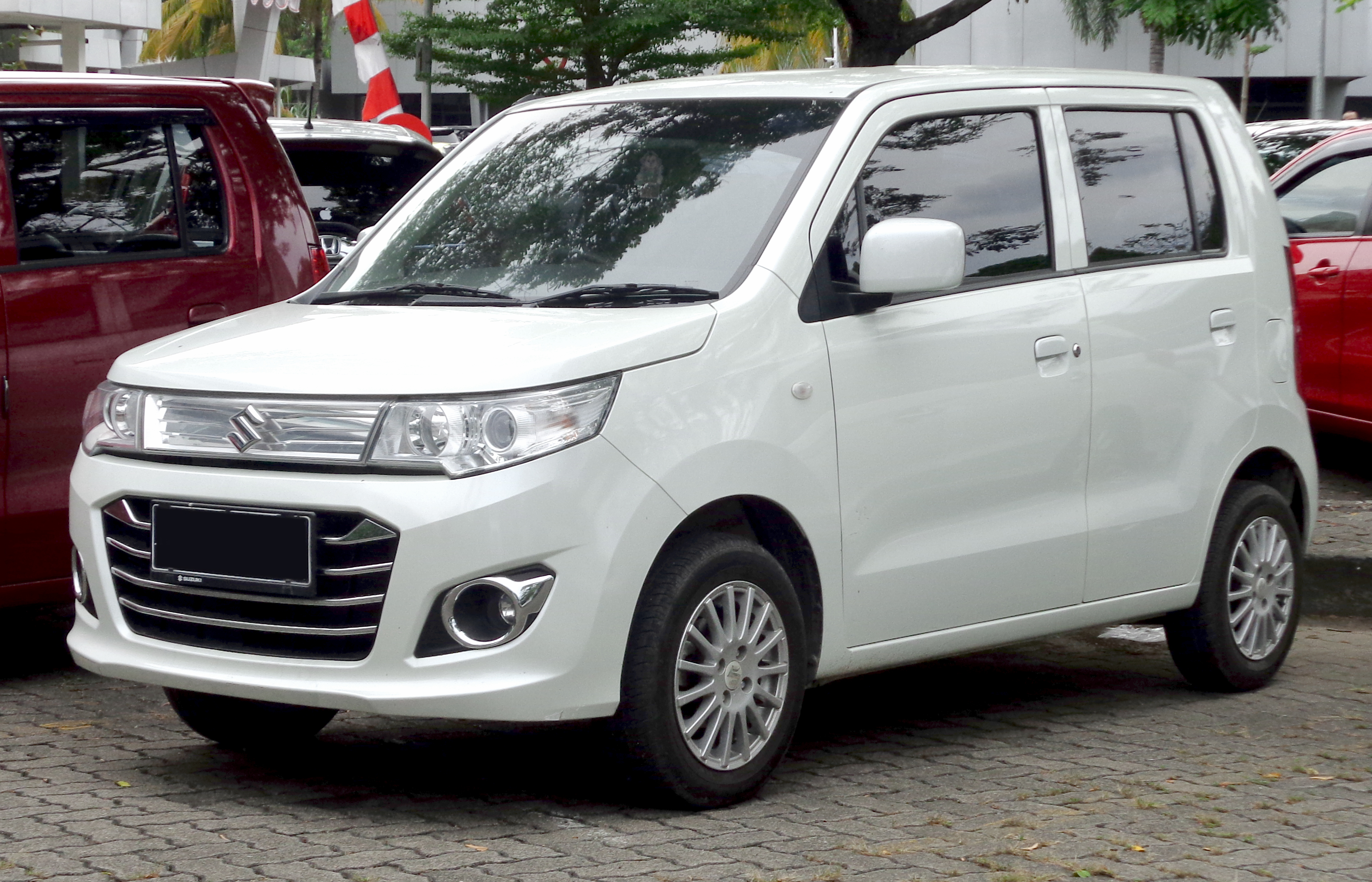
2019 Suzuki Karimun Wagon R GS (MP31S, Indonesia)

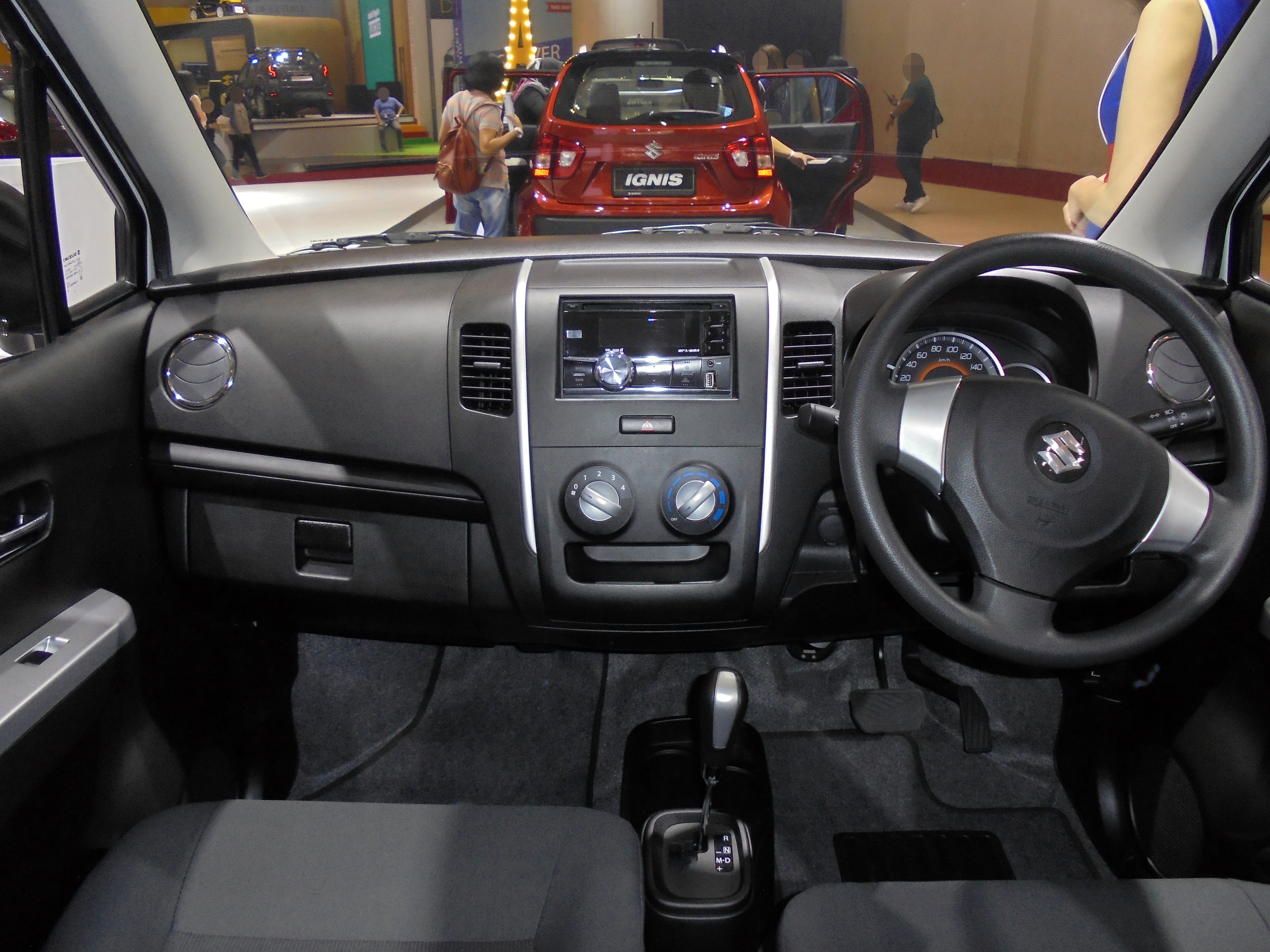
2019 Suzuki Karimun Wagon R GS interior (Indonesia)

=== Pak Suzuki Wagon R ===
The Pak Suzuki Wagon R is a Pakistani version of the Indonesian Suzuki Wagon R, but with more advanced AC system like the Indian version, 2-DIN integrated 9-inch LCD option, defoggers, boot parcel tray and the absence of GS (Stingray) and commercial panel van variants. The Dilago accessories is also available as separate option. As importing from India is impossible due to political issues, the car is imported as a knock-down kit from Indonesia and assembled by Pak Suzuki in Pakistan. The knock-down kit was imported from Indonesia since November 2013 and the car was launched in April 2014 with three trim levels (VX, VXR and VXL). The VX trim was discontinued in 2016. In January 2020, the VXL trim was updated with AGS automated-manual transmission and driver side airbag options. The Wagon R was discontinued in Pakistan in March 2025.

== Third generation (MT81S; 2019) ==
Third generation
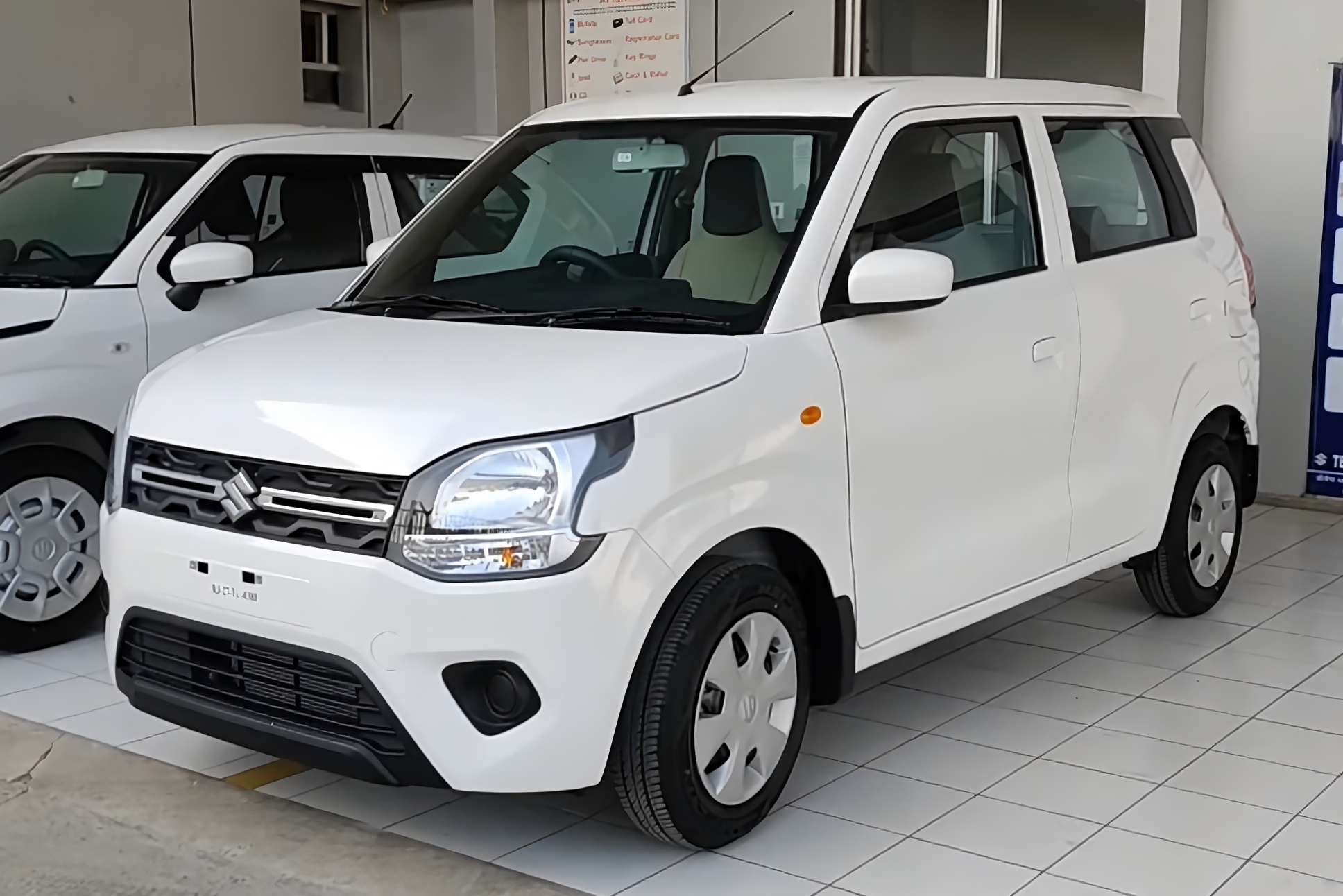
- 2020 Maruti Suzuki Wagon R VXi (India)

Overview
- Model code: MT81S
- Also called: Suzuki Wagon R; Suzuki Grand Wagon R (Sri Lanka)
- Production: 2019–present
- Assembly: India: Gurgaon, Haryana (Maruti Suzuki)

Body and chassis
- Platform: HEARTECT A platform
- Related: Suzuki Ignis (second generation); Suzuki Celerio (third generation)

Powertrain
- Engine: 1.0 L K10B I3 (petrol/CNG); 1.0 L K10C Dualjet I3 (petrol/CNG); 1.2 L K12M I4 (petrol); 1.2 L K12N Dualjet I4 (petrol)
- Transmission: 5-speed "AGS" AMT; 5-speed manual

Dimensions
- Wheelbase: 2,435 mm (95.9 in)
- Length: 3,655 mm (143.9 in)
- Width: 1,620 mm (63.8 in)
- Height: 1,675 mm (65.9 in)
- Curb weight: 805–850 kg (1,775–1,874 lb); 905–920 kg (1,995–2,028 lb) (CNG)

The third generation Wagon R was launched in India on 23 January 2019. The third generation Wagon R shares its HEARTECT platform with the Ignis, among other distant models including Celerio, Baleno, Swift and Wagon R kei car. As the result, the car is lighter than the outgoing model while also having a stronger body structure. As Suzuki distanced the Indian market Wagon R with the Japanese market Wagon R which its dimensions stuck within the kei car regulation, the third generation Wagon R become larger than its predecessor. The wheelbase is 35 mm (1.4 in) longer and the width has increased by a significant 125 mm (4.9 in). As the result, the interior size is increased significantly, the car offers larger legroom and shoulder room at the back, and would be able to properly carry five people instead of four. Capitalizing its size changes, Maruti Suzuki is marketing the car as the "Big New Wagon R".

Other than India, the car is also exported to Bangladesh, Nepal and Sri Lanka. The latter marketed the car as Grand Wagon R.

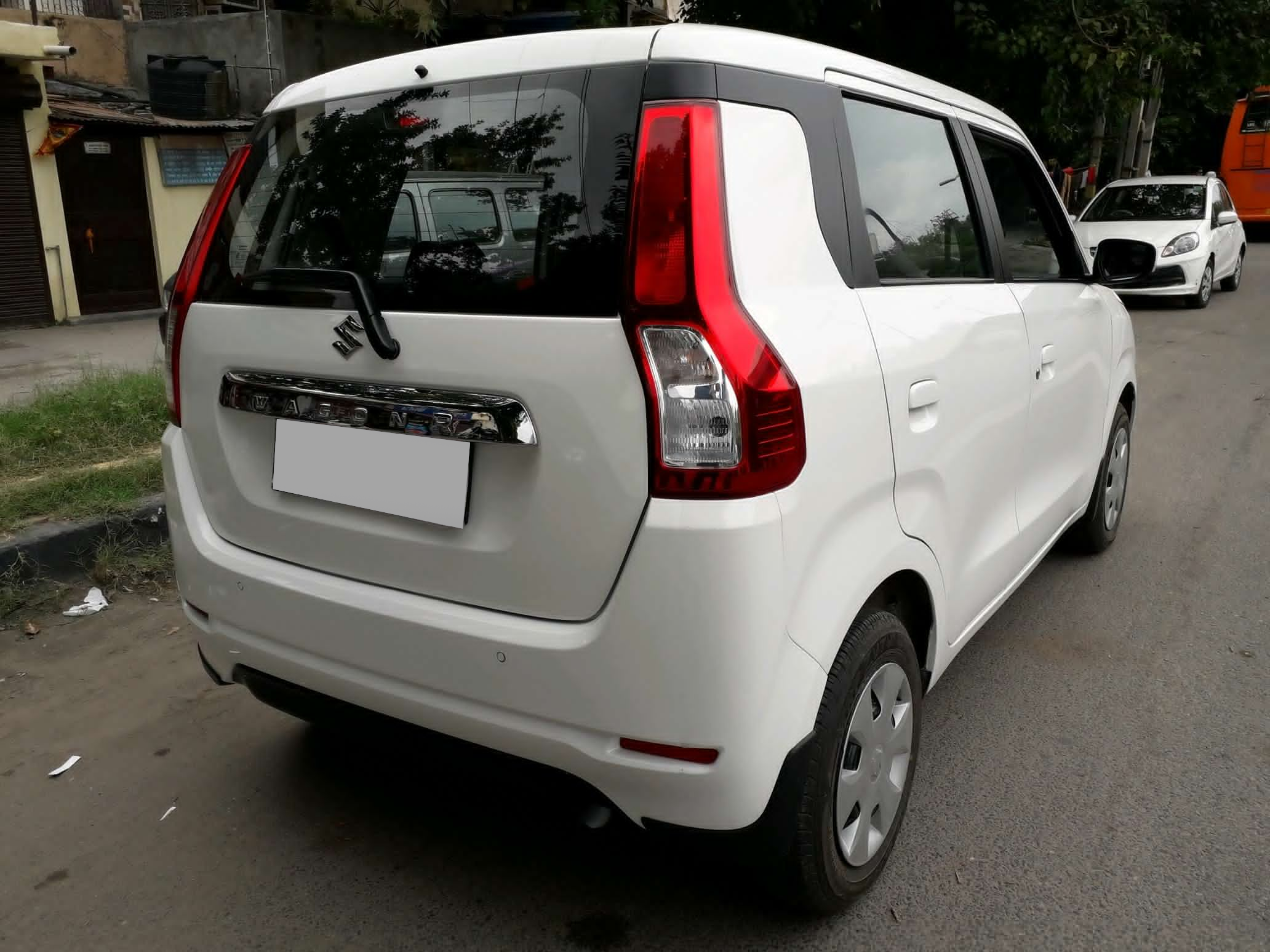
Rear

For the first time, the Wagon R is offered with two engine options. The base option is the K10B 1.0-litre petrol engine carried from the previous generation, with a more powerful K12M 1.2-litre petrol engine as an option. The 1.0-litre is only offered with manual transmission while the 1.2-litre is available with either manual transmission or AMT. The 1.2-litre engine of the Wagon R produces 82 PS (60 kW) of power and 113 Nm of torque. Meanwhile, the 1.0-litre engine option will deliver 68 PS (50 kW) of power and 90 Nm of torque. A factory-fitted CNG kit option is also offered in India for the 1.0 LXi trim. It produces lesser power and torque when on CNG mode and also heavier than petrol variant.

The improved Wagon R was introduced on 25 February 2022. The car received new K10C 1.0 and K12N 1.2-litre Dualjet engines with idle start stop system, beige and dark grey dual tone interior colour, dual tone exterior colour with black roof, black coloured 14-inch alloy wheels and hill-hold assist for AMT model. The car crossed 1 million mark for sales figures by July 2024.

=== Safety ===
The Wagon R for India with driver airbag received 2 stars for adult occupants and 2 stars for toddlers from Global NCAP 1.0 in 2019 (similar to Latin NCAP 2013).

Global NCAP 1.0 test results (India) Maruti Suzuki WagonR – Driver Airbag (2019, similar to Latin NCAP 2013)
Test	Score	Stars
Adult occupant protection	0.00/17.00	2 /5 stars
Child occupant protection	0/49.00	2 /5 stars

In 2023, it was again crash tested in Global NCAP 2.0 (similar to Latin NCAP 2016) but it was rated at 1 star for adults and 0 stars for toddlers.

Global NCAP 2.0 test results (India) Suzuki WagonR (2023, similar to Latin NCAP 2016)
Test	Score	Stars
Adult occupant protection	19.69/34.00	1 /5 stars
Child occupant protection	3.40/49.00	0 /5 stars

== Sales ==
As of December 2024, over 3.2 million (32 lakh) units of Wagon R were sold in India since December 1999, which around 660,000 (6,6 lakh) of them were CNG models. The Wagon R was the best selling car in India in 2021 and 2022.

Year	India	Indonesia	Pakistan
1999– 2008	±530,000		
2009	149,757		
2010	156,509		
2011	147,299		
2012	134,823		
2013	159,233	4,705	
2014	159,260	7,068	3,326
2015	170,399	11,526	7,606
2016	173,286	9,905	13,209
2017	166,815	5,408	24,247
2018	152,020	4,564	31,146
2019	155,967	4,148	21,079
2020	148,298	1,591	7,916
2021	183,851	2,510	18,810
2022	217,317		15,271
2023	201,301		3,494
2024	190,855		2,925
2025	194,238		1,060
