= Kreasi Mandiri Wintor Indonesia =

Indonesian automotive company

KMWI
- Company type: Private (PT)
- Industry: Automotive
- Founded: 2018; 8 years ago
- Founder: Sukiat
- Headquarters: Citeureup, West Java, Indonesia
- Area served: Indonesia
- Key people: Reiza Treistanto (President director)
- Products: Automobiles, commercial vehicles
- Website: www.kmwi-astra.com

PT Kreasi Mandiri Wintor Indonesia (KMWI) is an Indonesian automotive manufacturer. It is a subsidiary of PT Astra Otoparts Tbk.

== History ==
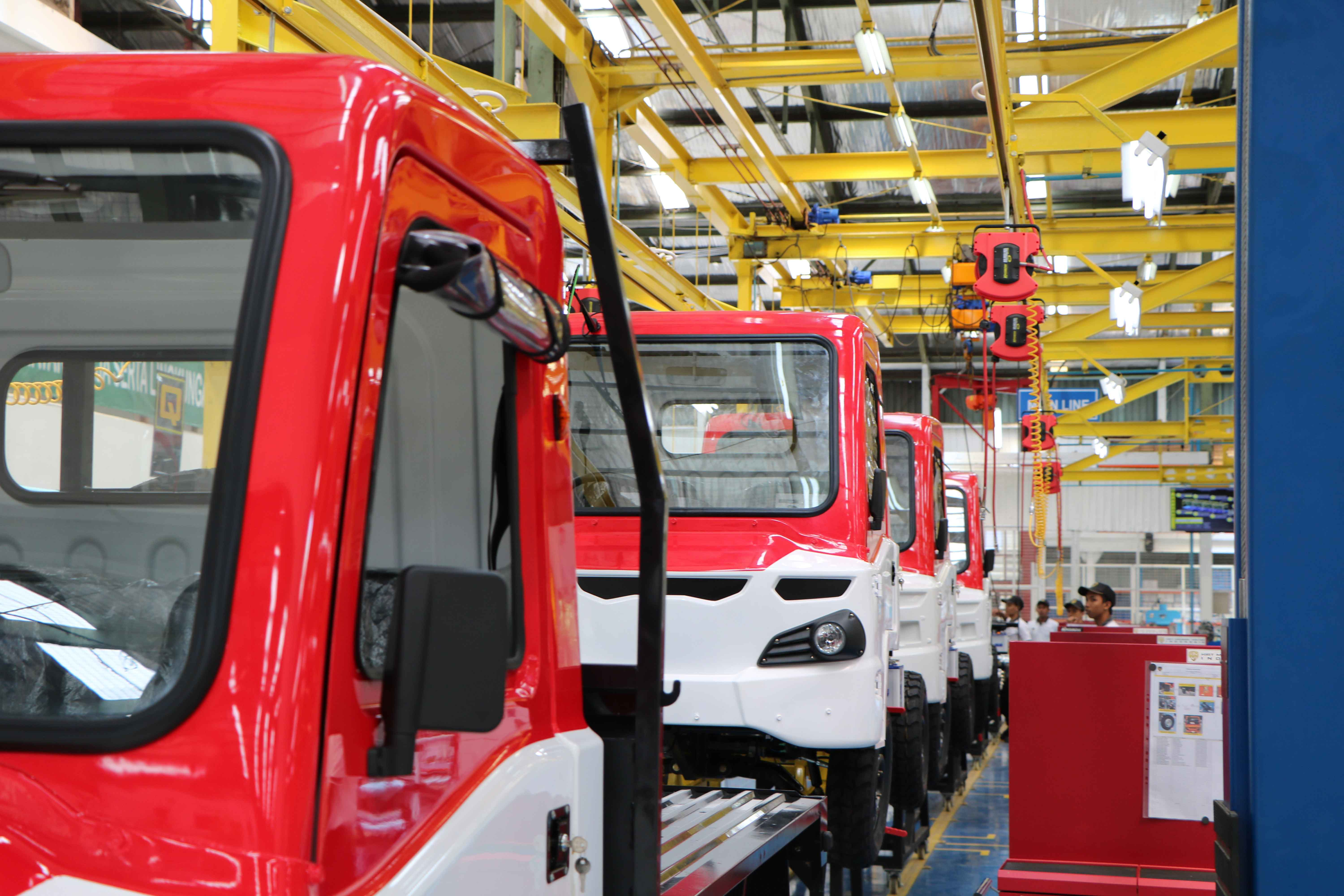
Production line in KMWI factory.

On June 11 2018, PT Astra Otoparts Tbk formed a new subsidiary, PT Kiat Mahesa Wintor Distributor (KMWD), a joint venture of PT Velasto Indonesia, PT Ardendi Jaya Sentosa, and PT Kiat Inovasi Indonesia. Through their new company they agreed to produce and distribute AMMDes through two joint ventures.

The first, PT Kiat Mahesa Wintor Indonesia (KMWI) as a company that designs, engineers and manufactures AMMDes. The second, PT Kiat Mahesa Wintor Distributor (KMWD) as a company that markets, sells and distributes spare parts, as well as provides post-sales technical support services. However, as the word "Kiat" omitted from the name, it was replaced by "Kreasi", making this company a new entity.

Initially, the prototype of AMMDes were produced in PT Velasto Indonesia's plant in Delta Silicon 3 industrial area, Cikarang, Bekasi, West Java. In November 2018, the production plant was moved to Citeureup. There was a plan to increase the annual production capacity of 3,000 units to 12,000 units in 2020 by opening a new plant in Klaten, but this plan was cancelled. The decision to cancel production plant in Klaten, was more due to efficiency considerations, considering that most AMMDes suppliers are in the Jabodetabek area.

On 24 August 2020, KMWI officially exported AMMDes to Nigeria, where it will be distributed by Dangote Group. The exported variants consists of Paddy Husker (Rice Peeler), Cassava Grinder, and Garri Processor. PT Kreasi Mandiri Wintor Distributor and PT Repindo Jagad Raya made a cooperation regarding the plan to export 10,000 AMMDes units by 2023 to 49 countries, including several countries in Southeast Asia.

== Model ==
- Alat Mekanis Multiguna Pedesaan (AMMDes) - 2018
  - 12 variants: Flat deck, 3-way bin door, ambulance, irrigation pump, electric generator, rice thresher, paddy husker, rice polisher, coffee huller, corn threshing, water purifier, shaved ice maker.

== See also ==
- Esemka
- Fin Komodo Teknologi
- Viar Motor Indonesia
