= Esemka =

Indonesian automotive company

PT Solo Manufaktur Kreasi
- Type: Private (PT)
- Industry: Automotive
- Founded: 2007
- Founder: Sukiyat
- Headquarters: Solo, Central Java, Indonesia
- Area served: Indonesia
- Key people: Eddy Wirajaya (President)
- Products: Automobiles, commercial vehicles, engines
- Website: esemkaindonesia.co.id

PT Solo Manufaktur Kreasi, trading as Esemka, is an Indonesian automotive company based in Solo, Indonesia. The "Esemka" brand was named after the Indonesian spelling of the abbreviation of vocational high school (SMK/Sekolah Menengah Kejuruan) to recognize the effort of the students to develop the native car brand. Though local media initially referred to it as Indonesia's national car brand, the company described Esemka as a vehicle that is entirely made in Indonesia. Since 2013, an average of 10 units of SUVs and mini trucks have been manufactured per month by the company. The company began commercial production of various models of cars and minivans at its manufacturing plant in Demangan village, Boyolali Regency in Central Java since 2016. It was officially inaugurated by then-president of Indonesia Joko Widodo on 6 September 2019. At the time of inauguration, the manufacturing plant has production capacity of 12,000 vehicles per year. Esemka uses locally made components from companies such as PT INKA and Pertamina.

== History ==
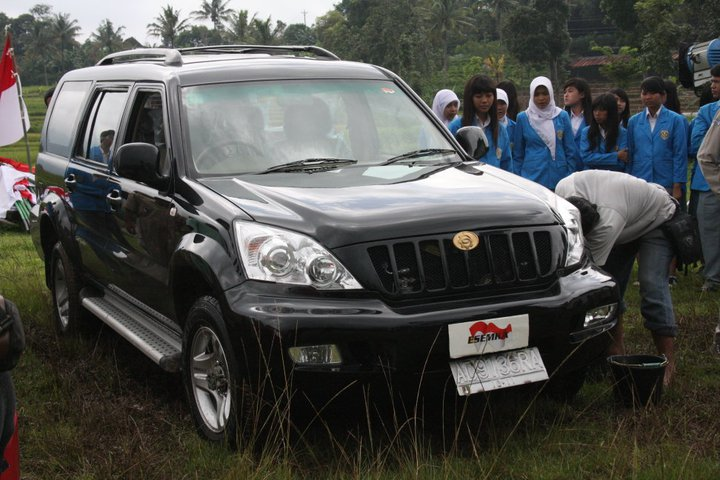
2011 Esemka Rajawali prototype

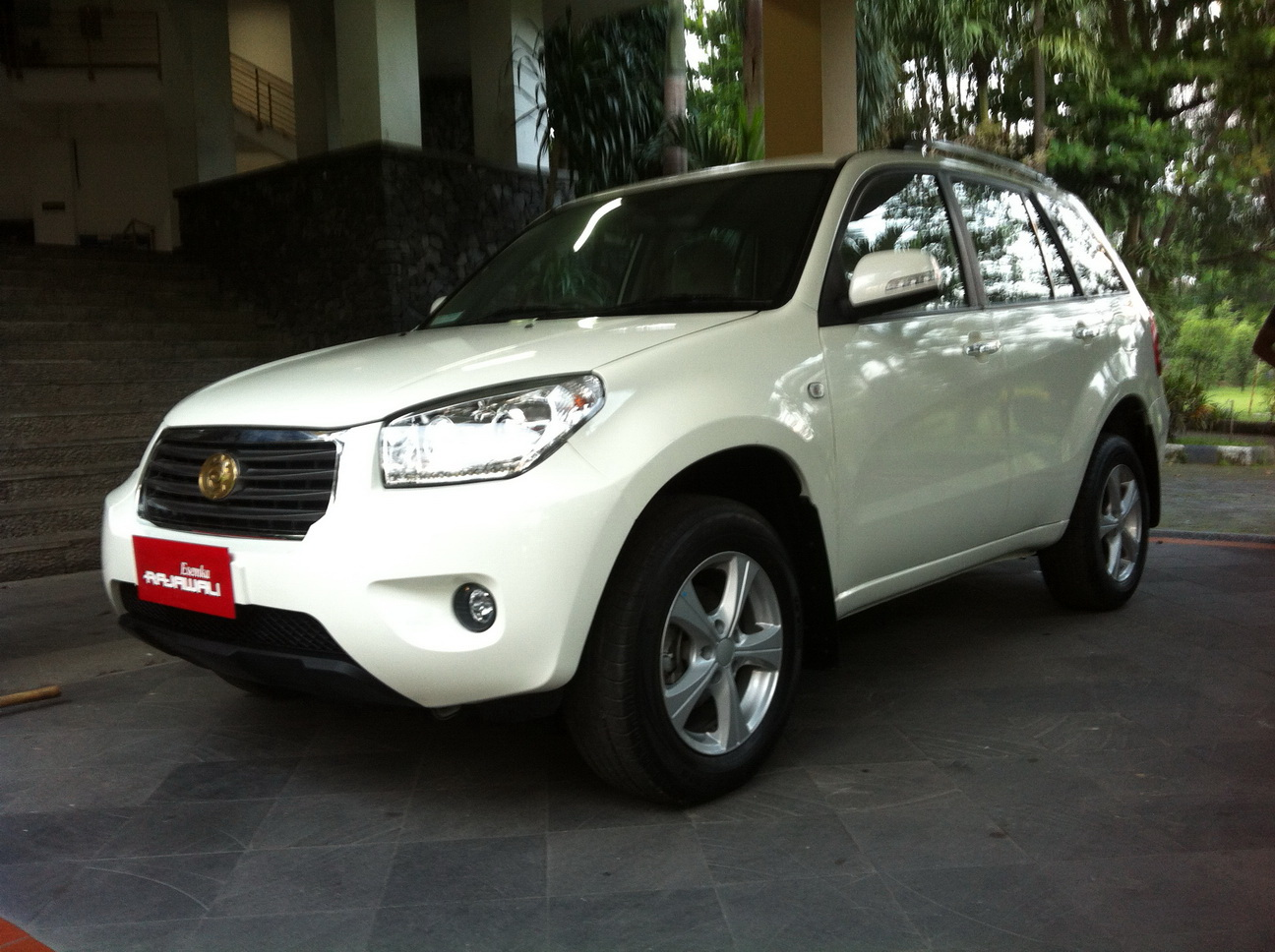
2014 Esemka Rajawali R2 prototype, based on Chery Tiggo

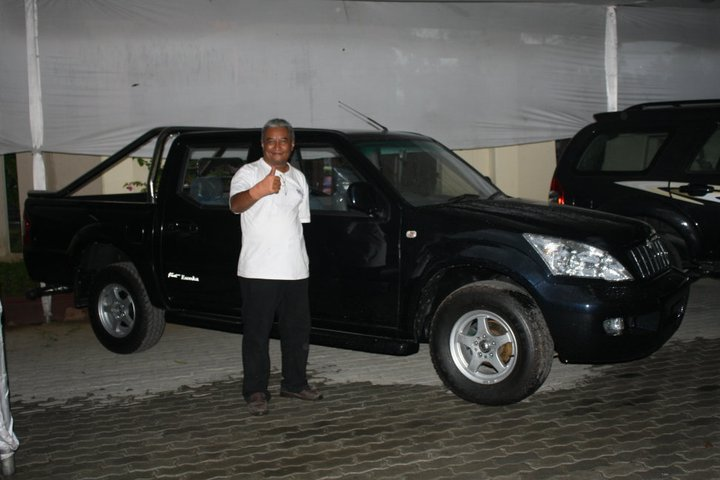
2011 Esemka Didgaya prototype

For a long time local companies in Indonesia have tried to design their own cars but failed to manufacture those in mass production. Besides Esemka, few other local made cars got publicity in the past, which include Gea by state-owned train manufacturer PT Industri Kereta Api (Inka), Tawon of PT Super Gasindo Jaya, and Fin Komodo of PT Fin Komodo Technology. A company PT Kiat Mahesa Wintor Indonesia (KMWI) has been commercially manufacturing a rural vehicle named as Mahesa since 2018.

The development of Esemka involved a number of Indonesian vocational high schools (Sekolah Menengah Kejuruan or SMK). Kiat Esemka was the first Esemka car, which was made in 2011 by students of SMK 1 Trucuk, a state-run vocational high school in Klaten, Central Java. The car got wide publicity when Joko Widodo started to use as official vehicle as Mayor of Solo during that time.

- 2007 - SMK Indonesia Partnering AIK (Autocar Indutri Components) designs and manufactures 1500 cc car engine components;
- 2008 - SMK Indonesia and AIK continue the engine component manufacturing program;
- 2009 - SMK partnered with PT Nasional Motor to make a double cabin body and with PT Mageda to build an SUV body and was approved by President Susilo Bambang Yudhoyono at an exhibition at ITB Bandung;
- 2010 - Partnering with Foday, Jinbei, and SMEs in Indonesia to develop SUVs and conduct product tests on minitrucks at the Indonesia International Manufacturing (IIM 2010) exhibition received an enthusiastic response from the public. This collaboration also led to the establishment of PT Solo Manufacturing Kreasi, which holds the Esemka brand;
- 2011 - PT Solo Manufaktur Kreasi takes care of production permits (Kemenperin) and road worthiness (Kemenhub and BTMP) according to Government Regulations so that they are commercially viable;
- 2012 - PT Solo Manufaktur Kreasi releases Variant Rajawali R2 and Bima 1.1 and collaborates with several foreign component manufacturers and SMEs in Indonesia to develop variants;
- 2013 - PT Solo Manufaktur Kreasi successfully released several units from the Esemka Rajawali variant for learning and operational media;
- 2014 - Esemka designed rural transport cars, mass public transport and also several high-passenger transport (Minibus and Minitruck). Handed over 40 Esemka SUVs and pick ups, which were the first production lot and were all produced at an SMK in Tangerang, Banten;
- 2015 - Esemka made prototypes of Digdaya 2.7 D, Bima 1.3, Bima 1.8D, Esemka Niaga 1.0;
- 2016 - Esemka builds the first assembly plan at Demangan village, Boyolali Regency in Central Java;
- 2019 - President Joko Widodo officially opened the Esemka Factory in Boyolali Regency, Central Java and launched the Bima;
- 2023 - Esemka joined the Indonesia International Motor Show for the first time and launched the Bima EV. The exhibition was visited by president Joko Widodo at its opening.

== Models ==
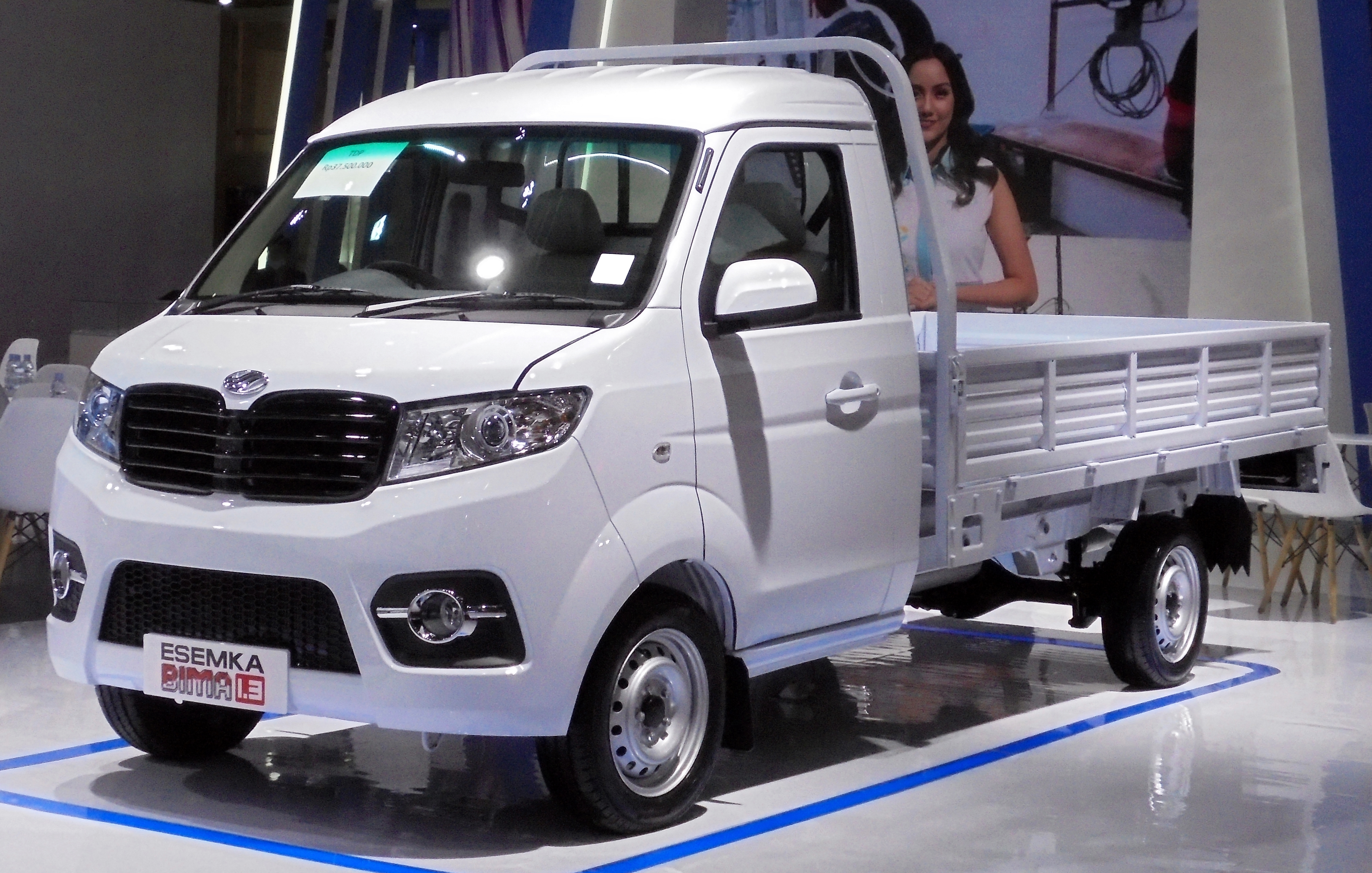
Esemka Bima 1.3

=== Prototype models ===
- Esemka Hatchback — hatchback (2009)
- Esemka Rosa Van — cab over van (2009)
- Esemka Digdaya — pickup truck, based on Foday Lion F22 (2017 model) (2009, 2011, 2017)
- Esemka Zhangaro — cab over pickup truck (2009)
- Esemka Rajawali — SUV, based on Foday Explorer III (2011)
- Esemka Rajawali R2 — crossover SUV, based on Chery Tiggo and Jonway A380 (2012, 2014)
- Esemka Patua — semi-cab over pickup truck, based on DFSK K05/K07 (2012)
- Esemka Bima 1.1 — semi-cab over pickup truck, based on Karry Youjin (2012)
- Esemka Garuda 1 — SUV, based on Foday Landfort (2017)
- Esemka Borneo — semi-cab over van, based on BAW 009 (2017)

=== Mass-production models ===
So far the following models are currently being manufactured by the company:

- Esemka Bima 1.2/1.3/EV — semi-cab over pickup truck, based on Chana Star 5, Jinbei T30, and SRM Shineray X30LEV (2019–2021)

== See also ==
- Automotive industry in Indonesia
