= Fin Komodo =

Indonesian buggy

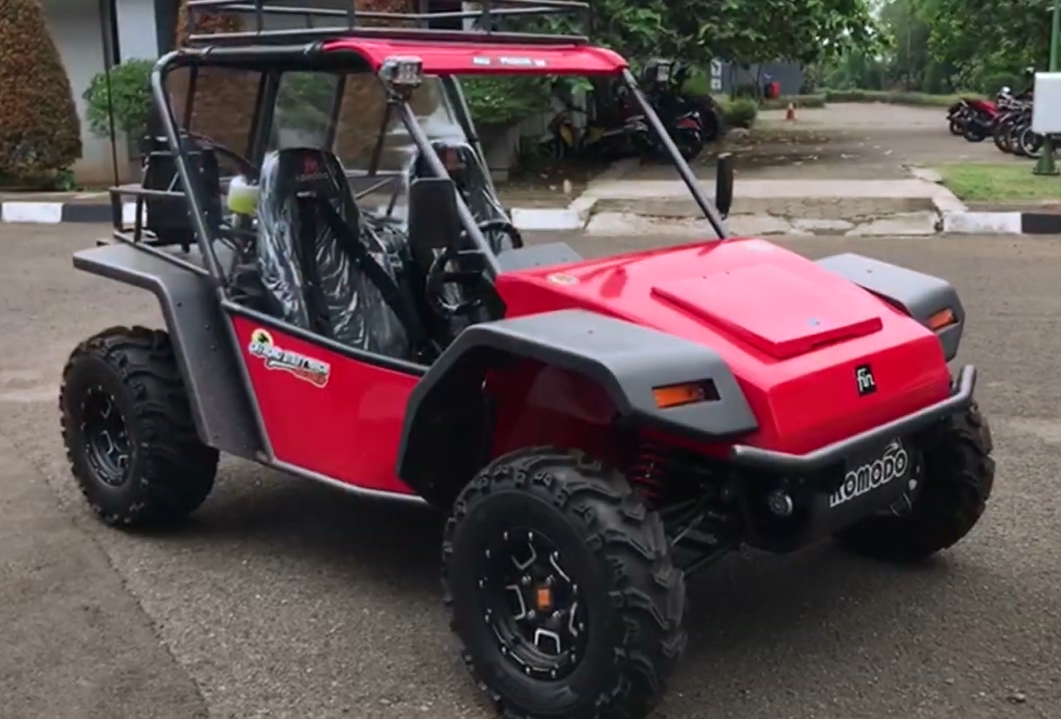
- A Fin Komodo KD 250 X

Overview
- Type: Buggy
- Manufacturer: PT Fin Komodo Teknologi
- Production: 2006–present
- Designer: Ibnu Susilo

Body and chassis
- Body style: Open body two-seater
- Chassis: Tubular frame

Powertrain
- Engine: Fin Power, 2-cylinder 4 stroke 250 cc 14 hp engine
- Transmission: Automatic CVT
- Range: 400 km

Dimensions
- Wheelbase: 2 m
- Length: 2.65 m
- Width: 1.75 m
- Height: 1.46 m
- Curb weight: 320 kg

Fin Komodo is a buggy-type car produced by PT Fin Komodo Teknologi (PT FKT). The buggy is targeted toward recreation.

== Description ==
The Fin Komodo is an off-road vehicle designed by ex-IPTN engineer, Ibnu Susilo, with the aim to be light-weight while being able to carry a heavy load.

Before being launched, PT FKT made 4 prototypes. The first and second prototypes used a 180cc two-stroke engine and 3-speed transmission. The first prototype was designed with a single seat while the second prototype was designed with 2 chairs. Both of these prototypes had an oil capacity of 0.3 liters, fuel capacity of 15 liters of gasoline, used a seamless tubular frame and trunk, and generated torques of 1.19 kg / 3000 rpm (11.7 Nm / 3000 rpm).

The third and fourth prototypes used a 250 cc four-stroke engine with a torque of 17.6 Nm per 5500 rpm. The capacity of the fuel tank increased to 20 liters. The engine in the third prototype used an automatic transmission consisting of high speed, low speed, neutral, and reverse, while the fourth prototype uses an automatic CVT transmission (forward, neutral, and reverse).

The first and second generations have an empty weight of 250 kg, while the third and fourth generations have an empty weight of 320 kg. The frame used on the fourth generation is a tubular frame.

The fourth prototype went into production under the name Komodo KD 250 AT.

== Models ==
=== KD 250 AT ===
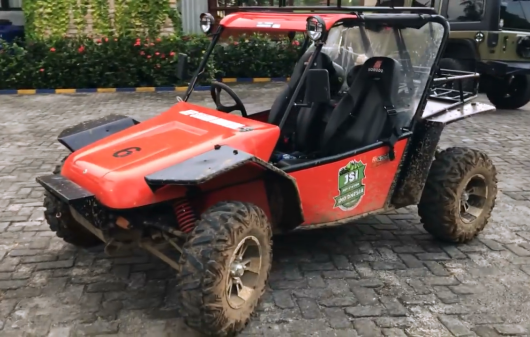
A Fin Komodo KD 250 AT

The first production run of Komodo used an engine named "Fin Power" which was designed by PT FKT. Despite the Indonesian design, the engine was made in China because there is no Indonesian manufacturer that can produce engines.

The KD 250 AT has hydraulic disc brakes, and the steering system uses a rack and pinion system. It is equipped with an automatic transmission (forward, neutral and reverse) and rear-wheel drive.

=== KIT 250 AT ===
The Komodo KIT (Combat Reconnaissance Vehicle) 250 AT is a military version intended for reconnaissance. First appeared in Indo Defense 2014, this vehicle was developed by Dislitbang AD with PT FKT. Weighing 600 kg, the Komodo KIT can be loaded into military cargo aircraft, such as the C-130 Hercules.

=== KD 250 X ===
The KD 250 X is the Fin Komodo which was first introduced at IIMS 2017, on May 1, 2017. The KD 250 X is generally seen as the civil version of Komodo KIT, as seen by its more angular fairing shape when compared to the KD 250 AT. The volume of the cabin is increased, the dashboard configuration has been changed, and the seat has been upgraded. The engine and some other components did not change.

=== Bledhex ===
The Bledhex is an electric variant of Fin Komodo KD 250 X, first shown at IIMS 2021 (15–25 April 2021). The name comes from Javanese word bledeg, meaning lightning. The body of the vehicle is made of polycarbonate with a tubular frame.

== See also ==
- Dune buggy
- Pindad Komodo
