= Low Cost Green Car =

Indonesian automobile program

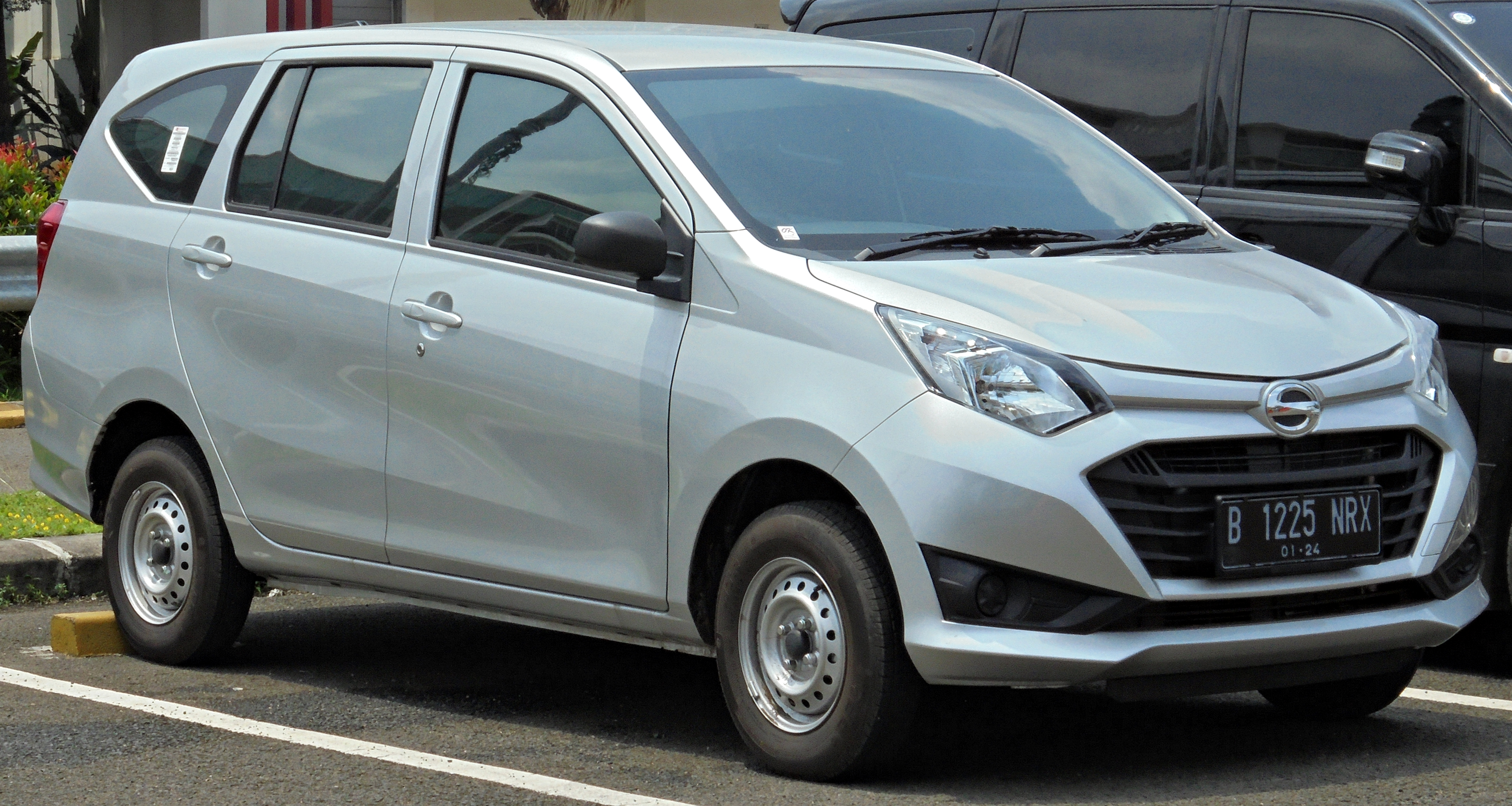
Daihatsu Sigra (2016–present)

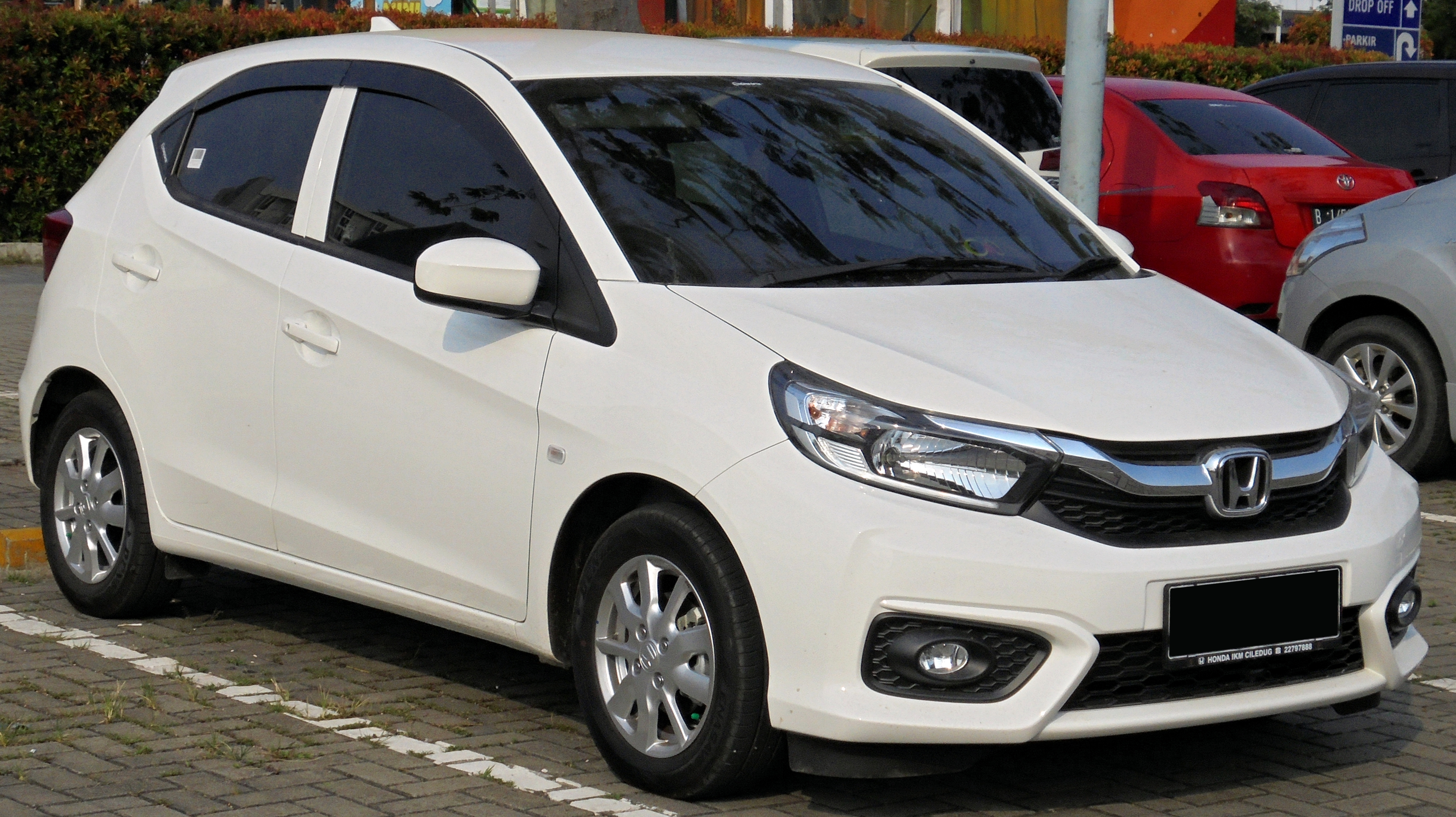
Honda Brio Satya (2018–present)

The Low Cost Green Car (LCGC; Indonesian: Kendaraan Bermotor Roda Empat Hemat Energi dan Harga Terjangkau (KBH2), lit. 'Energy Efficient and Affordable Four-Wheeler Motor Vehicles') is an Indonesian automobile regulation which exempts low-cost and energy-efficient cars from luxury sales tax to ensure affordability, provided that they are assembled locally with a minimum amount of local components. The introduction of Low Cost Green Cars (LCGC) in Indonesia aimed to make car ownership more accessible for motorcycle owners and public transportation users. This initiative was designed to reduce fuel subsidies and enhance competition with imported cars from Thailand, ultimately fostering local job creation. In some aspects, the regulation is similar to the Japanese kei car category and the Thai Eco Car program which also reduce taxes for small and efficient cars.

== Specifications ==
The Ministry of Industry regulates LCGC to conform with the following initial specifications:

- Petrol engine, displacement capacity of 980–1,200 cc (0.98-1.2 L) with fuel consumption not lower than 20 km/L (5 L/100 km; 56 mpg_{‑imp}; 47 mpg_{‑US});
- Research Octane Number (RON) 92 fuel for petrol engines;
- Diesel engine, displacement capacity up to 1,500 cc (1.5 L) with fuel consumption not lower than 20 km/L (5 L/100 km; 56 mpg_{‑imp}; 47 mpg_{‑US});
- Cetane number (CN) 51 fuel for diesel engines;
- Turning radius below 4.6 m (4,600 mm);
- Selling price below Rp 95,000,000 (2013) according to the location of the headquarters of the sole agent, with adjustment for automatic transmission being 15%, for safety features 10%, and could be adjusted to inflation;
- Addition of an Indonesian brand name and logo;
- Manufacturing facility investment plan.

== Regulation ==
In May 2013, the Indonesian government released the Government Regulation (Peraturan Pemerintah) Number 41 Year 2013 about the Luxury Tax of Vehicles concerning LCGC and Low Emission Carbon (LEC) regulations. The main points of the regulation are:

- 0 percent luxury tax for cars with ICE with a maximum displacement of 1,200 cc for petrol and 1,500 cc for diesel and a minimal fuel consumption of 20 km/L (5 L/100 km; 56 mpg_{‑imp}; 47 mpg_{‑US}).
- 50 percent luxury tax for green vehicles (hybrid, LPG, electric and others) with a minimal fuel consumption of 28 km/L (4 L/100 km; 79 mpg_{‑imp}; 66 mpg_{‑US}).
- 75 percent luxury tax for green vehicles (hybrid, LPG, electric and others) with a fuel consumption between 20 and 28 km/L (5 and 4 L/100 km; 56 and 79 mpg_{‑imp}; 47 and 66 mpg_{‑US}).

== Investment ==
Toyota, Daihatsu, Suzuki and Honda are set to produce a combined 500,000 LCGCs per year with a predicted total investment of $1.8 billion in Indonesia by the end of 2012, after the government has agreed to exempt the LCGC from the luxury tax to boost domestic sales.

On April 22, 2013, PT Astra Daihatsu Motor officially opened the Karawang Assembly Plant to anticipate LCGC, although the government's LCGC rule had not yet been released. The plant would assemble 4,000 units of the Toyota Avanza and/or Daihatsu Xenia per month in the first run and would produce 10,000 units of cars per month, including the LCGC Toyota Agya and Daihatsu Ayla when the rule had been released.

== Models and sales ==
Manufacturer	Model	Engine Displacement	Sales										
Manufacturer	Model	Engine Displacement	2013	2014	2015	2016	2017	2018	2019	2020	2021	2022	2023
Hatchback (5 seats)
Astra Daihatsu Motor	Daihatsu Ayla	1.0 L, 1.2 L	19,141	40,775	35,084	39,087	28,051	26,952	22,108	13,091	21,384	23,500	23,758
Nissan Motor Indonesia	Datsun Go Panca (2014–2020)	1.2 L	–	2,733	9,462	8,833	4,303	4,782	3,013	215	–	–	–
Honda Prospect Motor	Honda Brio Satya	1.2 L	4,958	26,683	31,820	36,470	43,378	46,900	54,659	29,979	29,976	46,804	52,792
Suzuki Indomobil Motor	Suzuki Karimun Wagon R (2013–2021)	1.0 L	4,705	7,068	11,526	9,905	5,408	4,564	4,148	1,591	2,510	–	–
Toyota Astra Motor	Toyota Agya	1.2 L	22,376	67,074	57,646	45,009	29,004	29,106	25,082	12,952	16,992	21,336	20,602
MPV (7 or 5+2 seats)
Astra Daihatsu Motor	Daihatsu Sigra	1.0 L, 1.2 L	–	–	–	31,939	44,993	50,907	52,283	23,295	40,283	51,427	61,752
Nissan Motor Indonesia	Datsun Go+ Panca (2014–2020)	1.2 L	–	17,787	19,896	16,650	6,181	3,263	1,612	85	–	–	–
Toyota Astra Motor	Toyota Calya	1.2 L	–	–	–	47,280	73,236	63,970	54,549	23,442	35,375	43,582	45,801
Total			▲51,180	▲162,120	▲165,434	▲235,173	▼234,554	▼230,444	▼217,203	▼117,741	▲146,520	▲186,649	▲204,705

In the first three months of 2014, 43,969 LCGC cars were sold.

In the first six months of 2014, 85,643 LCGC cars were sold.

In first seven months of 2014, the LCGC Toyota Agya sold 41,520 units to become the third highest selling car in Indonesia after the Toyota Avanza and Honda Mobilio.

== Production and export ==
In 2013, Indonesia produced 52,956 LCGC/LEC with no export, and predicted that the 2014 LCGC/LEC production would be 150,000 units. Initial exports of the Daihatsu Ayla (as the Toyota Wigo) had been done in February 2014 to the Philippines. In 2013, Indonesia had exported non LCGC/LEC 170,907 Completely Built-Up (CBU) cars, and 105,380 Completely Knocked Down (CKD) cars.

== See also ==
- Rural car
- Kei car
