= Suzuki K engine =

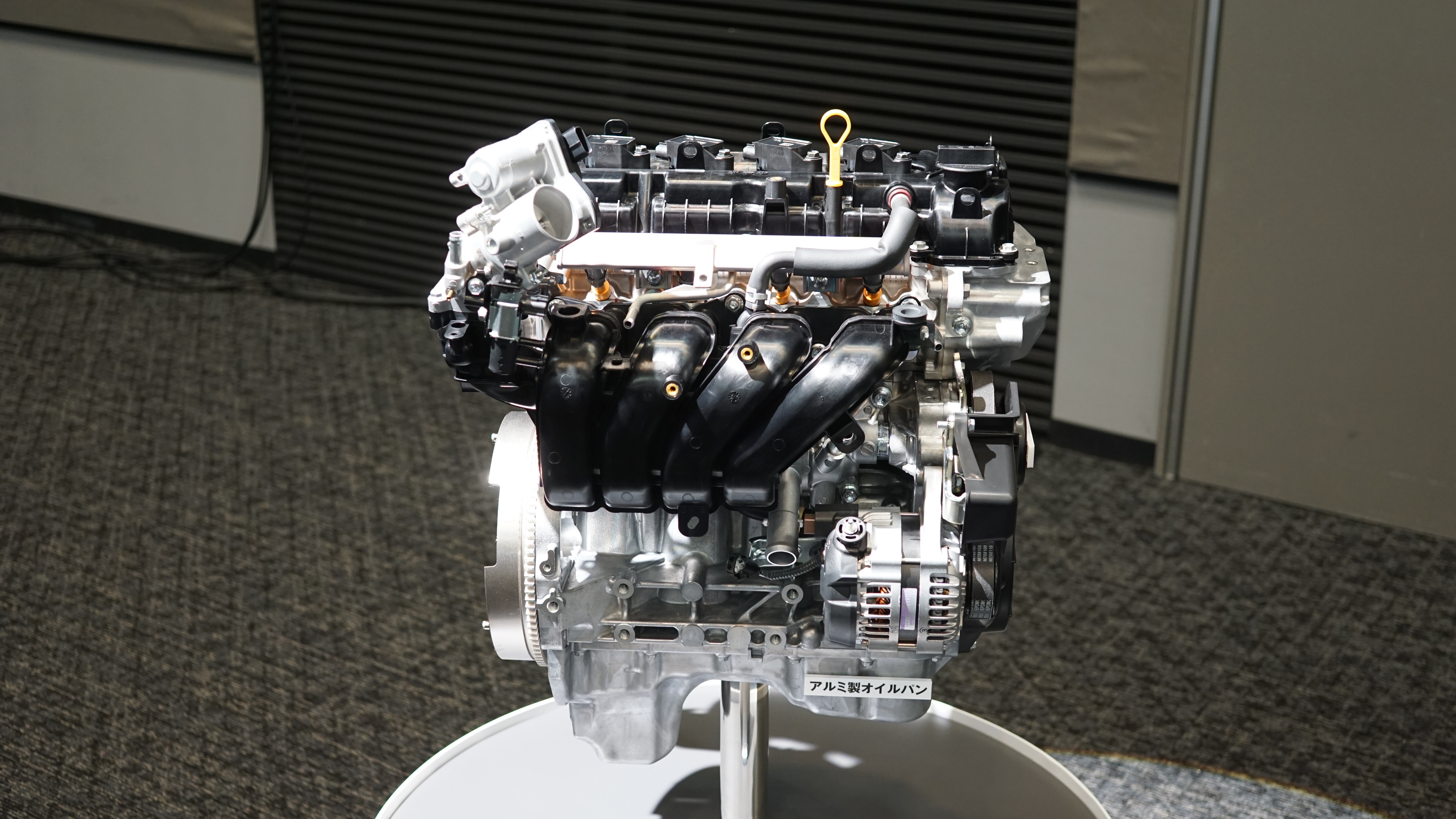
- Suzuki K15B engine

Overview
- Manufacturer: Suzuki
- Production: 1994–present

Layout
- Configuration: Inline-three engine; Inline-four engine
- Displacement: 658 cc (0.66 L); 996 cc (1.0 L); 998 cc (1.0 L); 1,171 cc (1.2 L); 1,197 cc (1.2 L); 1,242 cc (1.24 L); 1,373 cc (1.4 L); 1,462 cc (1.5 L)
- Cylinder bore: 68 mm (2.7 in); 71 mm (2.80 in); 73 mm (2.87 in); 74 mm (2.91 in)
- Piston stroke: 60.4 mm (2.38 in); 68.6 mm (2.70 in); 71.5 mm (2.81 in); 74 mm (2.91 in); 74.2 mm (2.92 in); 79.5 mm (3.13 in); 82 mm (3.23 in); 83 mm (3.27 in); 85 mm (3.35 in)
- Cylinder block material: Aluminium
- Cylinder head material: Aluminium
- Valvetrain: DOHC 4 valves per cylinder with VVT (since 1999)
- Valvetrain drive system: Timing Chain
- Compression ratio: 8.4–13.0:1

RPM range
- Max. engine speed: 6200–8500 rpm

Combustion
- Turbocharger: IHI, Mitsubishi
- Fuel system: Multipoint fuel injection or direct injection
- Fuel type: Petrol; CNG
- Oil system: Wet sump
- Cooling system: Water-cooled

Output
- Power output: 37–146 PS (36–144 hp; 27–107 kW)
- Torque output: 55–235 N⋅m (6–24 kg⋅m; 41–173 lb⋅ft)

Chronology
- Predecessor: F series; G series (G10 engines); M series
- Successor: R series (K6A engine); Z series (K12 engines)

The Suzuki K engine family is a series of automobile engines from Suzuki, introduced in 1994. Displacements range from 0.7 L to 1.5 L. All engines have aluminium cylinder blocks with three or four cylinders in-line. Cylinder heads have two overhead camshafts, driven by chain, and four valves per cylinder. Fuel is gasoline/petrol, metered by multipoint fuel injection or direct injection. Some variants are turbocharged.

Since 2013, some of the K engines range have been upgraded with Dualjet technology. The upgrades include new two injectors per cylinder, increased compression ratio (improving the thermal efficiency), redesigned water jacket shape, piston cooling by oil jets, water-cooled EGR system and several other changes for fuel efficiency. The turbocharged variant with direct injection fuel system is called Boosterjet.

Furthermore, a mild hybrid technology with 12 or 48-volt Integrated Starter Generator (ISG) dubbed as Smart Hybrid Vehicle by Suzuki (SHVS) is available for markets with stricter emission regulation, such as Europe, Japan, India, Singapore and Mexico (marketed as Boostergreen). This mild hybrid technology helps to increase fuel mileage, providing optional acceleration and also reduces emissions. A strong hybrid variant with Motor Generator Unit (MGU) is available in Europe and Japan.

== Three-cylinder ==
=== K6A ===
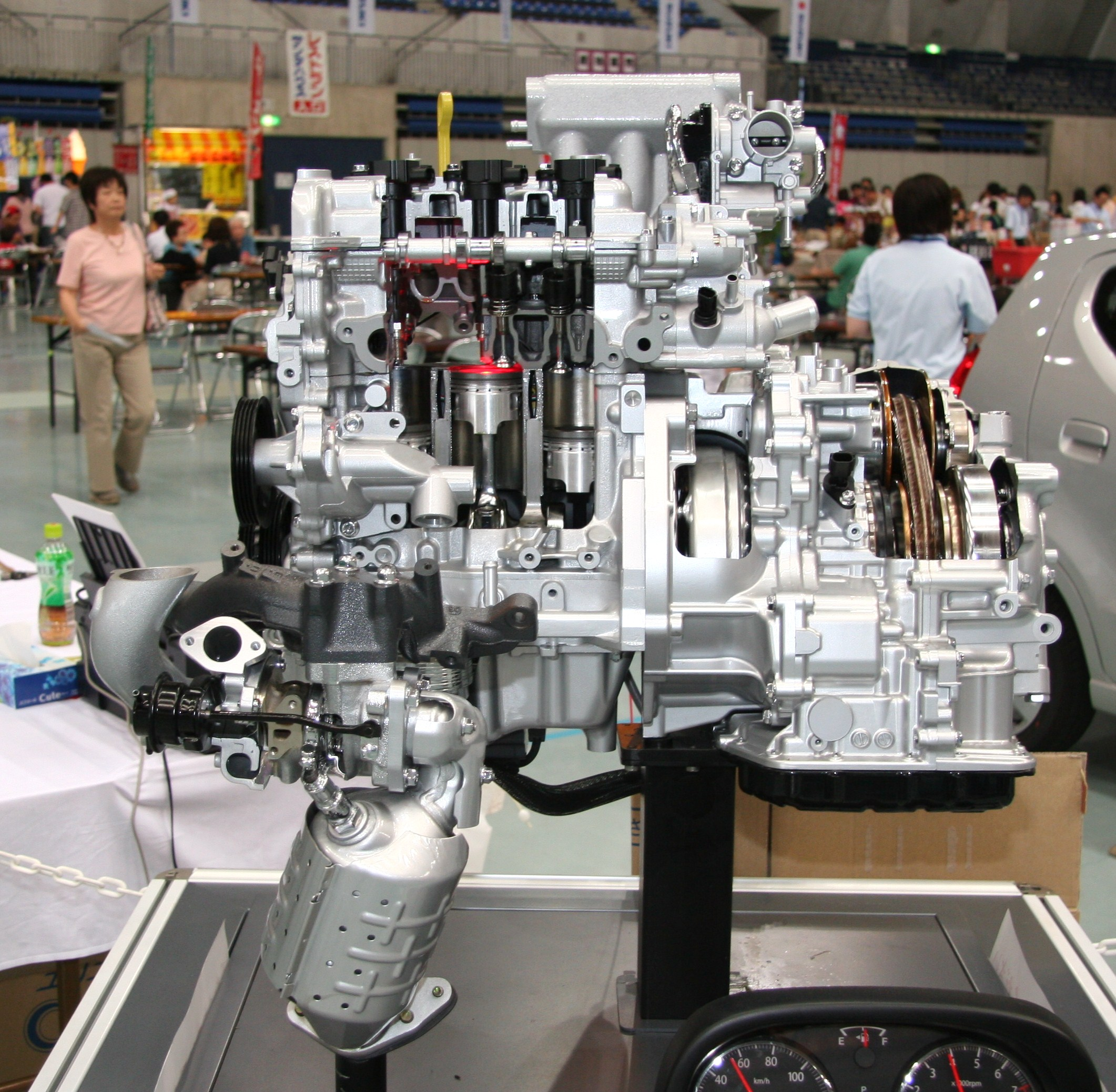
Suzuki K6A turbo with Jatco JF012E CVT transmission

This is the first K engine, which first appeared in 1994 and was discontinued in 2018. It is the smallest in the family and also the first K engine with VVT. This engine was available in several versions, such as naturally aspirated, turbocharged, lean-burn, CNG and strong hybrid. The hybrid version was also the first hybrid engine in the kei car class and only available in the Suzuki Twin.

Technical specifications:

- Displacement: 658 cc (0.66 L)
- Bore and stroke: 68 mm x 60.4 mm
- Valvetrain: DOHC, 12-valve, with or without VVT
- Compression ratio: 8.4–8.9 (turbo), 10.5 (NA)
- Maximum power:
  - 37–54 PS (27–40 kW; 36–53 hp) at 5500–6500 rpm (NA)
  - 60–64 PS (44–47 kW; 59–63 hp) at 6000–6500rpm (turbo)
  - 50 PS (36.8 kW; 49.3 hp) at 6500 rpm (CNG)
- Maximum torque:
  - 55–63 N⋅m (6–6 kg⋅m; 41–46 lb⋅ft) at 3500–4000 rpm (NA)
  - 83–108 N⋅m (8–11 kg⋅m; 61–80 lb⋅ft) at 3000–3500rpm (turbo)
  - 58 N⋅m (6 kg⋅m; 43 lb⋅ft) at 3500 rpm (CNG)

Applications:

- Naturally aspirated
  - 1997–2012 Suzuki Wagon R/Mazda AZ-Wagon
  - 1998–2008 Suzuki Kei
  - 1998–2014 Suzuki Alto
  - 1998–2014 Mazda Carol
  - 1999–2006 Mazda Laputa
  - 2001–2011 Suzuki MR Wagon/Nissan Moco
  - 2001–2013 Suzuki Carry/Every
  - 2001–2013 Mazda Scrum Truck
  - 2002–2008 Mazda Spiano
  - 2002–2015 Suzuki Alto Lapin
  - 2003–2005 Suzuki Twin
  - 2004–2009 Arctic Cat T660
  - 2006–2009 Suzuki Cervo
  - 2008–2013 Suzuki Palette
  - 2009–2013 Nissan Roox
  - 2010–2010 Nissan Pino
  - 2012–2013 Mazda Flair Wagon
- Turbocharged
  - 1994–1998 Suzuki Alto
  - 1995–1998 Suzuki Cappuccino
  - 1995–2018 Suzuki Jimny
  - 1997–2012 Suzuki Wagon R/Mazda AZ-Wagon
  - 1998–2008 Suzuki Kei
  - 1998–2008 Mazda AZ-Offroad
  - 1999–2006 Mazda Laputa
  - 2001–2011 Suzuki MR Wagon/Nissan Moco
  - 2001–2013 Suzuki Every/Mazda Scrum Van
  - 2002–2008 Mazda Spiano
  - 2002–2015 Suzuki Alto Lapin
  - 2004–2009 Arctic Cat T660 Turbo (110 hp)
  - 2006–2009 Suzuki Cervo
  - 2008–2013 Suzuki Palette
  - 2009–2013 Nissan Roox
  - 2012–2013 Mazda Flair Wagon
  - 2013–2017 Caterham 7 160/165 (80 hp)

=== K10B ===
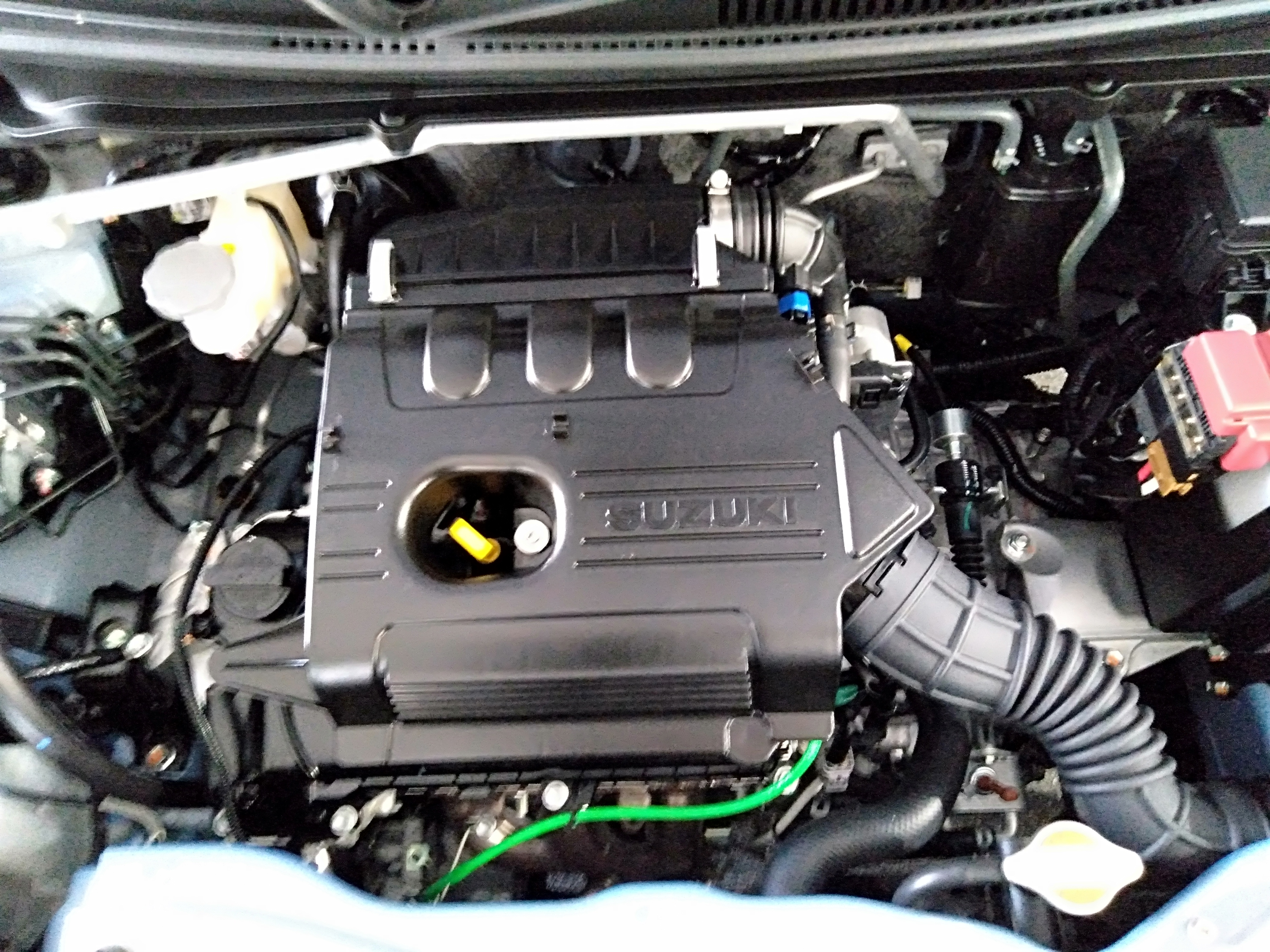
Suzuki K10B engine

The three-cylinder 1.0-litre version of K engine, fitted in many Suzuki's city cars since 2008. In 2014, this engine was reworked by increasing the compression ratio from 10.0 to 11.0:1 and known as K-Next. This changes claimed to increase the petrol mileage over 23km/L, achieved maximum power on lower rev and reduced frictional losses. CNG variant also available for Indian domestic market.

Technical specifications:

- Displacement: 996 cc (1.0 L)
- Bore and stroke: 73 mm x 79.4 mm
- Valvetrain: DOHC, 12-valve
- Compression ratio: 10.0–11.0
- Maximum power:
  - 65–68 PS (48–50 kW; 64–67 hp) at 6000 rpm
  - 59 PS (43 kW; 58 hp) at 6000 rpm (CNG)
- Maximum torque:
  - 90 N⋅m (66 lb⋅ft) at 3500 rpm
  - 78 N⋅m (58 lb⋅ft) at 3500 rpm (CNG)

Applications:

- 2008–2021 Suzuki Celerio
- 2008–2014 Suzuki Splash
- 2008–2014 Opel/Vauxhall Agila ecoFLEX
- 2008–2014 Suzuki Alto/A-Star/Nissan Pixo
- 2009–2014 Maruti Suzuki Estilo/Karimun Estilo (India/Indonesia)
- 2010–2025 Suzuki Wagon R (India/Pakistan/Sri Lanka)
- 2010–2022 Suzuki Alto K10
- 2013–2021 Suzuki Karimun Wagon R (Indonesia)
- 2017–present Suzuki Cultus (Pakistan)
- 2019–2022 Suzuki S-Presso

=== K10C ===
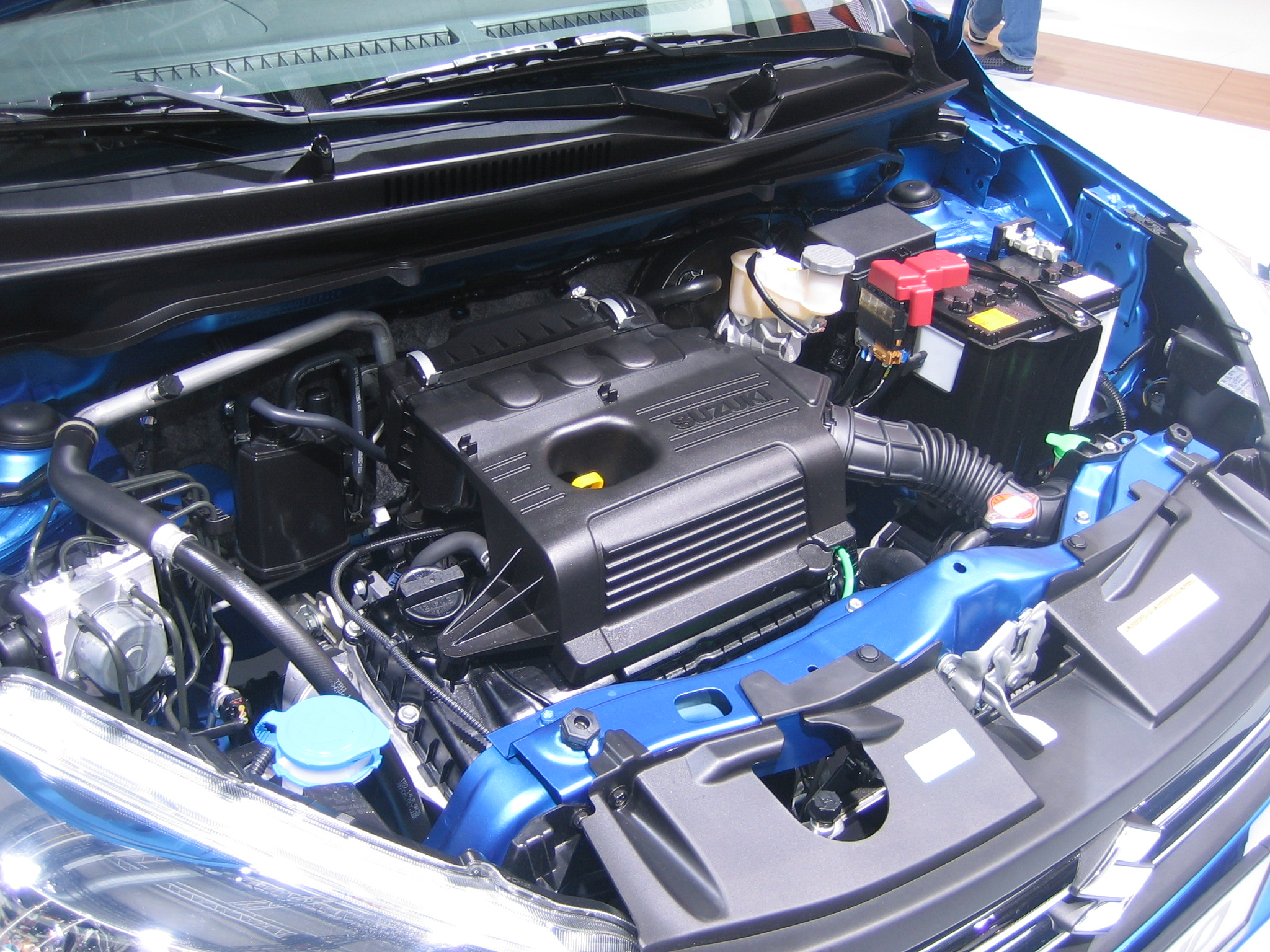
Naturally aspirated K10C engine for European market Suzuki Celerio

Reworked version of K10B engine with naturally aspirated Dualjet or turbocharged direct injection Boosterjet technology. The compression ratio was increased from 11.0:1 to 12.0:1 for more thermal efficiency and reduced frictional losses. Suzuki's SHVS mild hybrid system is available for this engine in European and Japanese market. The CNG version is also available for Indian market.

Technical specifications:

- Displacement: 998 cc (1.0 L)
- Bore and stroke: 73 mm x 79.4 mm
- Valvetrain: DOHC, 12-valve, Single or Dual VVT
- Compression ratio: 10.0 (turbo), 12.0 (NA)
- Maximum power:
  - 65–68 PS (48–50 kW; 64–67 hp) at 5500–6000 rpm (NA)
  - 57 PS (42 kW; 56 hp) at 5300 rpm (CNG)
  - 3 PS (2 kW; 3 hp) at 1000 rpm (electric motor)
  - 99–111 PS (73–82 kW; 98–109 hp) at 5500 rpm (turbo)
- Maximum torque:
  - 89–93 N⋅m (9–9 kg⋅m; 66–69 lb⋅ft) at 3500 rpm (NA)
  - 82 N⋅m (8 kg⋅m; 60 lb⋅ft) at 3400 rpm (CNG)
  - 150–170 N⋅m (15–17 kg⋅m; 111–125 lb⋅ft) at 1500–4500 rpm (turbo)
  - 50 N⋅m (5 kg⋅m; 37 lb⋅ft) at 100 rpm (electric motor)

Applications:

- Naturally aspirated
  - 2015–present Suzuki Celerio
  - 2022–present (Maruti) Suzuki Wagon R
  - 2022–present (Maruti) Suzuki Alto K10
  - 2022–present Suzuki S-Presso
  - 2023–present Toyota Vitz (Africa)
- Turbocharged
  - 2015–2022 Suzuki Baleno
  - 2016–2021 Suzuki SX4 S-Cross (Europe)
  - 2017–2024 Suzuki Swift
  - 2017–2025 Suzuki Xbee
  - 2018–2021 Suzuki Vitara (Europe)
  - 2023–present Suzuki Fronx (India/Bangladesh/Sri Lanka)
  - 2024–present Toyota Urban Cruiser Taisor
  - 2026–present Suzuki Brezza

== Four-cylinder ==
=== K10A ===
The smallest four-cylinder K-series engine.

Technical specifications:

- Displacement: 996 cc (1.0 L)
- Bore and stroke: 68 mm x 68.6 mm
- Valvetrain: DOHC, 16-valve, with or without VVT
- Compression ratio: 8.4 (turbo), 10.0 (NA)
- Maximum power:
  - 65–70 PS (48–51 kW; 64–69 hp) at 6500–7000 rpm (NA)
  - 100 PS (74 kW; 99 hp) at 6500 rpm (turbo)
- Maximum torque:
  - 88 N⋅m (65 lb⋅ft) at 3500 rpm (NA)
  - 118 N⋅m (87 lb⋅ft) at 4000 rpm (turbo)

Applications:

- Naturally aspirated
  - 1997–2002 Suzuki Wagon R+
  - 1999–2001 Chevrolet Wagon R+ (Colombia/Ecuador)
  - 1999–2003 Chevrolet Alto (Colombia/Ecuador)
  - 2000–2002 Chevrolet MW (Japan)
- Turbocharged
  - 1997–2000 Suzuki Wagon R+ (Japan)
  - 2000–2002 Chevrolet MW (Japan)

=== K12A ===
Technical specifications:

- Displacement: 1,172 cc (1.2 L)
- Bore and stroke: 71 mm x 74 mm
- Valvetrain: DOHC, 16-valve
- Compression ratio: 9.3
- Maximum power:
  - 69 PS (51 kW; 68 hp) at 6000 rpm
- Maximum torque:
  - 95 N⋅m (70 lb⋅ft) at 3250 rpm

Applications:

- 1998–2000 Suzuki Wagon R+ (Europe)

=== K12B ===
Appeared first in 2008 and reworked with Dualjet technology in 2013. In China, this engine was also used by Suzuki's former joint venture partners, Changan Suzuki and its subsidiaries. Known under E-Power EA12 or JL473Q names.

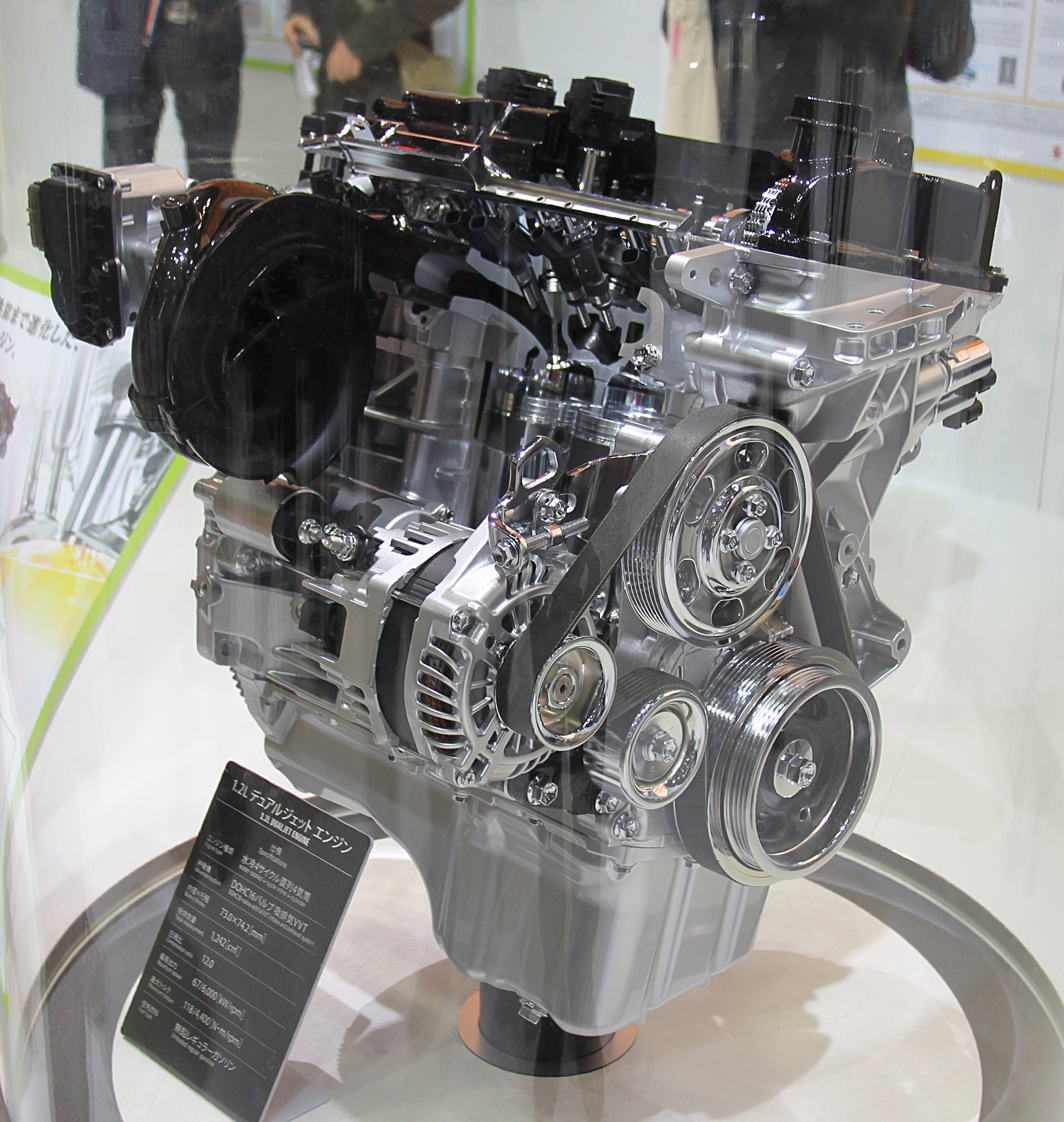
Suzuki K12B Dualjet engine

Technical specifications:

- Displacement: 1,242 cc (1.24 L)
- Bore and stroke: 73 mm x 74.2 mm
- Valvetrain: DOHC, 16-valve, VVT
- Compression ratio: 11.0–12.0
- Maximum power:
  - 86–92 PS (63–68 kW; 85–91 hp) at 5500–6000 rpm
- Maximum torque:
  - 114–118 N⋅m (12–12 kg⋅m; 84–87 lb⋅ft) at 4400–4800 rpm

Applications:

- 2008–2014 Suzuki Splash
- 2008–2014 Opel/Vauxhall Agila
- 2020–2012 Suzuki Landy (China)
- 2010–2017 Suzuki Swift
- 2011–2015 Suzuki Solio/Mitsubishi Delica D:2
- 2012–2021 Changan/Changhe/Chana Star series
- 2013–2016 Changan CX20
- 2014–2024 Suzuki Ciaz (Thailand)
- 2014–2015 Chana Taurustar
- 2019–present Esemka Bima 1.2

=== K12C ===
The Dualjet version of K12B engine and can also combined with 12-volt SHVS mild hybrid technology or a strong hybrid system with Motor Generator Unit (MGU).

Technical specifications:

- Displacement: 1,242 cc (1.24 L)
- Bore and stroke: 73 mm x 74.2 mm
- Valvetrain: DOHC, 16-valve, Dual VVT
- Compression ratio: 12.5
- Maximum power:
  - 90–91 PS (66–67 kW; 89–90 hp) at 6000 rpm
  - 3 PS (2 kW; 3 hp) at 1000 rpm (mild hybrid electric motor)
  - 14 PS (10 kW; 14 hp) at 3185–8000 rpm (strong hybrid electric motor)
- Maximum torque:
  - 120 N⋅m (12 kg⋅m; 89 lb⋅ft) at 4400 rpm
  - 50 N⋅m (5 kg⋅m; 37 lb⋅ft) at 100 rpm (mild hybrid electric motor)
  - 30 N⋅m (3 kg⋅m; 22 lb⋅ft) at 1000–3185 rpm (strong hybrid electric motor)

Applications:

- 2015–2025 Suzuki Solio/Mitsubishi Delica D:2
- 2017–2024 Suzuki Swift
- 2015–2025 Suzuki Ignis
- 2015–2020 Suzuki Baleno (Europe and Japan)

=== K12D ===
Replacing the previous K12C Dualjet engine for European (and several other markets), as the European emission standard has moved to Euro 6d stage. The displacement is the same as K12M and K12N Dualjet engines. The SHVS mild hybrid system is also standard.

Technical specifications:

- Displacement: 1,197 cc (1.2 L)
- Bore and stroke: 73 mm x 71.5 mm
- Valvetrain: DOHC, 16-valve, Dual VVT
- Compression ratio: 13.0
- Maximum power:
  - 83 PS (61 kW; 82 hp) at 6000 rpm
  - 3 PS (2 kW; 3 hp) at 800 rpm (electric motor)
- Maximum torque:
  - 107 N⋅m (11 kg⋅m; 79 lb⋅ft) at 2000 rpm
  - 35 N⋅m (4 kg⋅m; 26 lb⋅ft) at 499 rpm (electric motor)

Applications:

- 2020–2024 Suzuki Swift Hybrid (Europe)
- 2020–2025 Suzuki Ignis Hybrid (Europe)

=== K12M ===
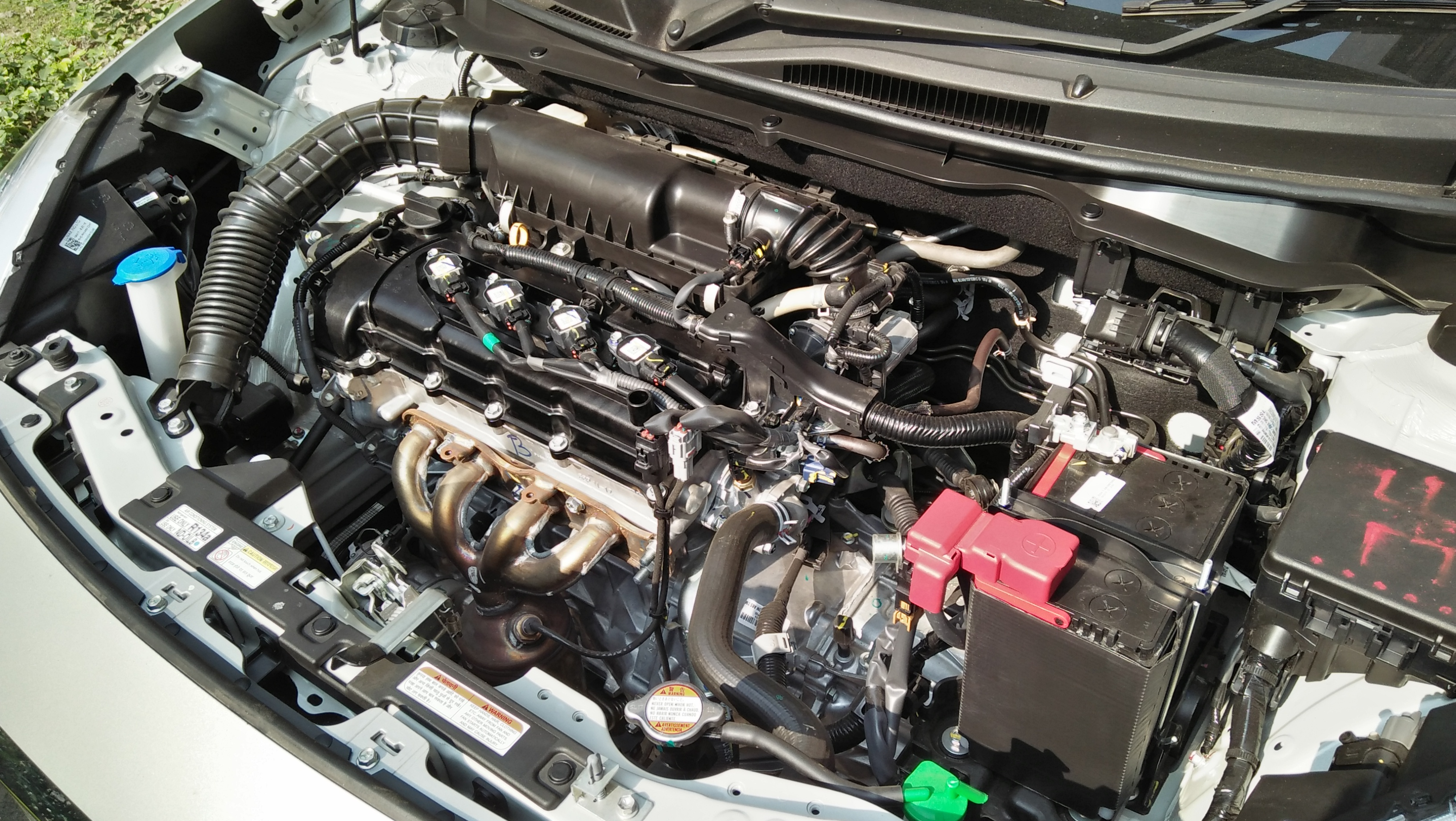
Suzuki K12M engine

Destroked version of the K12B, developed by Maruti Suzuki. Mainly for the Indian market as the country imposed higher excise tax for petrol engines larger than 1,200 cc. This engine is also available for markets in South East Asia, South America and Africa; in 2020 the K12D derivative was developed from this.

VVT technology was added for this engine in 2012. In February 2018, the Dualjet version was introduced first in Thailand with higher 11.5:1 compression ratio.

Technical specifications:

- Displacement: 1,197 cc (1.2 L)
- Bore and stroke: 73 mm x 71.5 mm
- Valvetrain: DOHC, 16-valve, with or without VVT
- Compression ratio: 10.5–11.5
- Maximum power:
  - 83–87 PS (61–64 kW; 82–86 hp) at 6000 rpm
  - 71 PS (52 kW; 70 hp) at 6000 rpm (CNG)
- Maximum torque:
  - 108–113 N⋅m (11–12 kg⋅m; 80–83 lb⋅ft) at 4000–4400 rpm
  - 95 N⋅m (10 kg⋅m; 70 lb⋅ft) at 4000 rpm (CNG)

Applications:

- 2009–2016 Suzuki Splash/Maruti Ritz
- 2010–present Suzuki Swift
- 2010–2025 Suzuki Dzire/Swift sedan
- 2015–2022 Suzuki Baleno (India/Sri Lanka)
- 2017–present Suzuki Ignis
- 2019–2022 Suzuki Wagon R (India)
- 2019–2022 Toyota Glanza (India)

=== K12N ===
Dualjet version of K12M engine and also available with SHVS mild hybrid technology. A version for commercial vehicles with lower output is also available.

Technical specifications:

- Displacement: 1,197 cc (1.2 L)
- Bore and stroke: 73 mm x 71.5 mm
- Valvetrain: DOHC, 16-valve, Dual VVT
- Compression ratio: 12.0
- Maximum power:
  - 90 PS (66 kW; 89 hp) at 6000 rpm
    80.7 PS (59 kW; 80 hp) at 6000 rpm (commercial vehicle)
  - 75.5 PS (56 kW; 74 hp) at 6000 rpm (CNG)
    71.6 PS (53 kW; 71 hp) at 6000 rpm (CNG, commercial vehicle)
- Maximum torque:
  - 113 N⋅m (12 kg⋅m; 83 lb⋅ft) at 4200 rpm
    104.4 N⋅m (11 kg⋅m; 77 lb⋅ft) at 2900 rpm (commercial vehicle)
  - 98.5 N⋅m (10 kg⋅m; 73 lb⋅ft) at 4300 rpm (CNG)
    95 N⋅m (10 kg⋅m; 70 lb⋅ft) at 2800 rpm (CNG, commercial vehicle)

Applications:

- Transversal:
  - 2020–2025 Suzuki Dzire (India/Nepal)
  - 2021–2024 Suzuki Swift (India/Nepal/Bangladesh)
  - 2019–present Suzuki Baleno/Toyota Glanza (India)
  - 2022–present Suzuki Wagon R (India)
  - 2023–present Suzuki Fronx (India/Nepal)
  - 2024–present Toyota Urban Cruiser Taisor
- Longitudinal:
  - 2022–present Suzuki Eeco
  - 2023–present Suzuki Super Carry

=== K14B ===
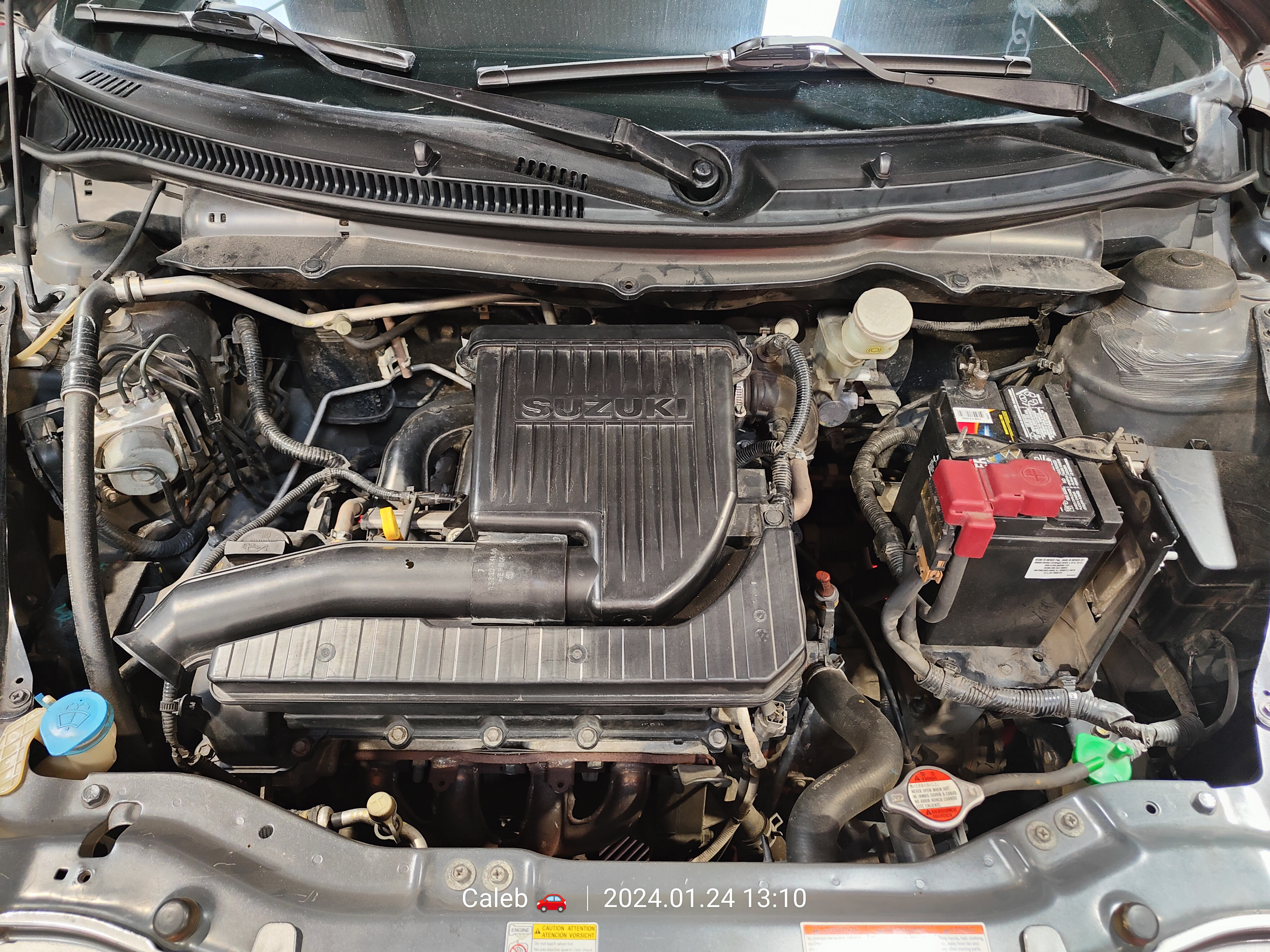
Suzuki K14B

Similar as K12B, this engine was also used by Suzuki's former joint venture partner in China. Known under E-Power EA14 or JL473Q1 names.

Technical specifications:

- Displacement: 1,372 cc (1.4 L; 83.7 cu in)
- Bore and stroke: 73 mm x 82 mm
- Valvetrain: DOHC, 16-valve, VVT
- Compression ratio: 10.0–11.0
- Maximum power:
  - 92–96 PS (68–71 kW; 91–95 hp) at 6000 rpm
  - 84 PS (62 kW; 83 hp) at 6000 rpm (CNG)
- Maximum torque:
  - 130–134 N⋅m (13–14 kg⋅m; 96–99 lb⋅ft) at 4000–4800 rpm
  - 110 N⋅m (11 kg⋅m; 81 lb⋅ft) at 4000–4800 rpm (CNG)

Applications:

- 2007–2010 Suzuki Landy (China)
- 2010–2017 Suzuki Swift
- 2011–2018 Changhe Spla (China/South America)
- 2012–present Changhe Big Dipper
- 2012–2016 Changhe Ideal
- 2012–2019 Suzuki Ertiga
- 2013–2015 Chana Eulove
- 2013–2021 Changan Alsvin
- 2013–2016 Changan CX20
- 2013–2017 Mazda VX-1 (Indonesia)
- 2013–2018 Changhe Suzuki Liana (China)
- 2014–2023 Changan BenBen
- 2014–2015 Chana Taurustar
- 2014–2017 Changan Alsvin V3
- 2014–2025 Suzuki Ciaz
- 2015–2020 Changhe M50S
- 2016–2019 Proton Ertiga (Malaysia)
- 2017–2022 Suzuki Baleno
- 2020–2022 Toyota Starlet (Africa)
- 2020–present Changan Star van

=== K14C ===
Boosterjet version of K14B engine with direct injection and turbocharger. This engine is no longer available since mid-2020 for European market and replaced by K14D Boosterjet mild hybrid engine.

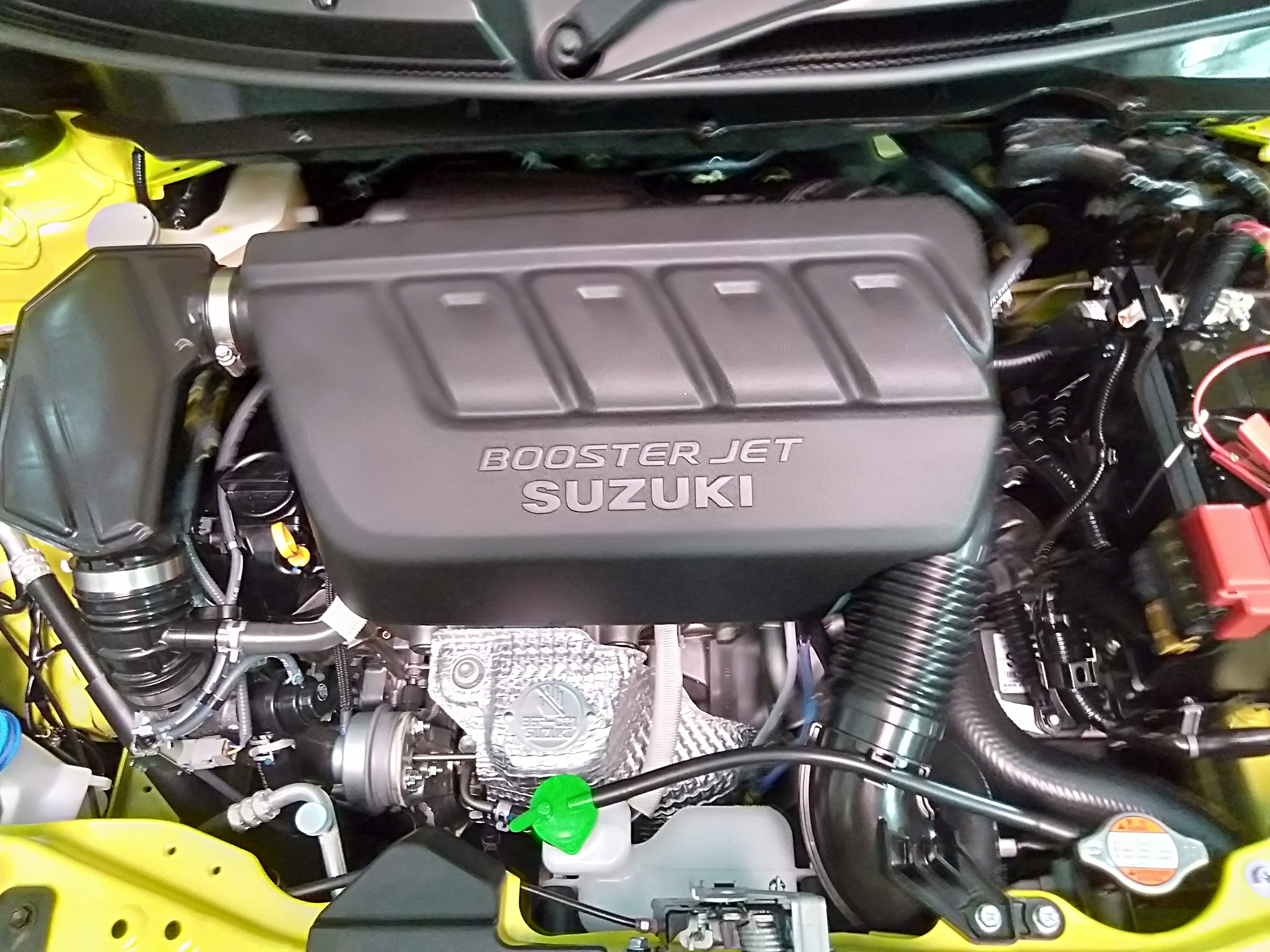
Suzuki K14C engine

Technical specifications:

- Displacement: 1,372 cc (1.4 L)
- Bore and stroke: 73 mm x 82 mm
- Valvetrain: DOHC, 16-valve, VVT
- Compression ratio: 9.9
- Maximum power:
  - 136–146 PS (100–107 kW; 134–144 hp) at 5500 rpm
- Maximum torque:
  - 210–230 N⋅m (21–23 kg⋅m; 155–170 lb⋅ft) at 1500–4000 rpm

Applications:

- 2015–2025 Suzuki Vitara/Escudo
- 2016–2025 Suzuki SX4 S-Cross
- 2018–present Suzuki Swift Sport

=== K14D ===
Reworked K14C Boosterjet engine for European market. Combined with a 48-volt SHVS mild hybrid technology to pass Euro 6d emission standard.

Technical specifications:

- Displacement: 1,372 cc (1.4 L)
- Bore and stroke: 73 mm x 82 mm
- Valvetrain: DOHC, 16-valve, Dual VVT
- Compression ratio: 10.8
- Maximum power:
  - 110 PS (81 kW; 108 hp) at 4500 rpm (Europe from 2025)
  - 129 PS (95 kW; 127 hp) at 5500 rpm
  - 14 PS (10 kW; 14 hp) at 3000 rpm (electric motor)
- Maximum torque:
  - 235 N⋅m (24 kg⋅m; 173 lb⋅ft) at 2000 rpm
  - 53 N⋅m (5 kg⋅m; 39 lb⋅ft) at 3000 rpm

Applications:

- 2020–present Suzuki SX4 S-Cross Hybrid (Europe)
- 2020–2025 Suzuki Swift Sport Hybrid (Europe, Singapore, Taiwan, Hong Kong and Macau)
- 2020–present Suzuki Vitara Hybrid (Europe)

=== K15B ===
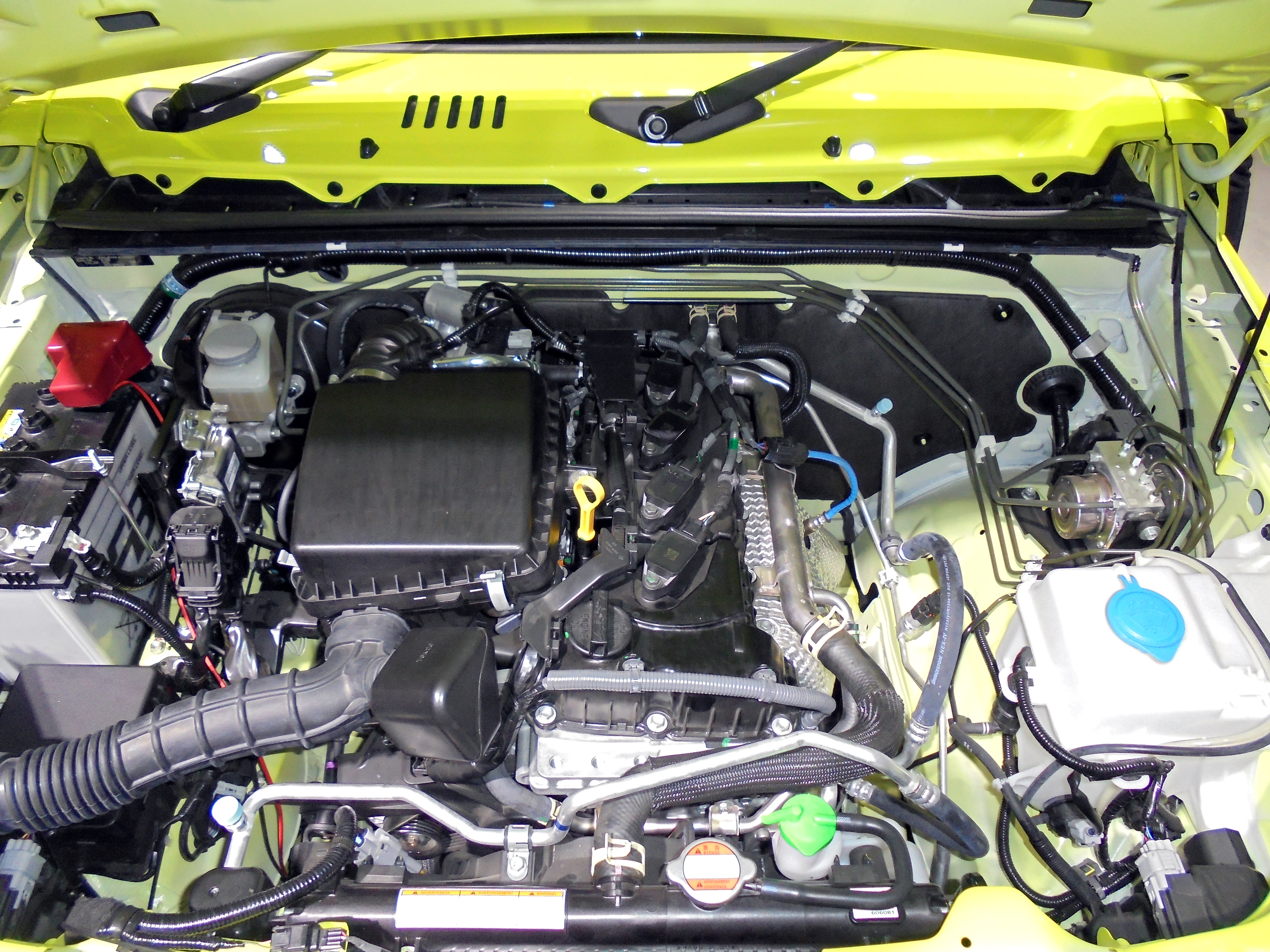
The K15B engine installed longitudinally in the Jimny

The biggest engine in the range. SHVS mild hybrid system also available and claimed over 17% more fuel efficient that the non-SHVS engine.

Technical specifications:

- Displacement: 1,462 cc (1.5 L)
- Bore and stroke: 74 mm x 85 mm
- Valvetrain: DOHC, 16-valve, VVT
- Compression ratio: 10.0–10.5
- Maximum power:
  - 102–106 PS (75–78 kW; 101–105 hp) at 6000 rpm
  - 92 PS (68 kW; 91 hp) at 6000 rpm (CNG)
- Maximum torque:
  - 130–138 N⋅m (13–14 kg⋅m; 96–102 lb⋅ft) 4000–4400 rpm
  - 122 N⋅m (12 kg⋅m; 90 lb⋅ft) at 4400 rpm (CNG)

Applications:

- 2018–2025 Suzuki Ciaz (Africa/India/Middle East)
- 2018–present Suzuki Ertiga
- 2018–present Suzuki Jimny Sierra
- 2019–present Suzuki XL6/XL7
- 2020–2022 Suzuki S-Cross Hybrid (India)
- 2020–2022 Suzuki Vitara Brezza/Toyota Urban Cruiser (India)
- 2021–2025 Toyota Belta (Africa/Middle East)
- 2021–present Toyota Rumion (Africa)
- 2022–present Suzuki Baleno (Global)
- 2023–present Suzuki Fronx (Africa/Indonesia, base model)
- 2023–present Suzuki Grand Vitara (Africa/Brunei, FWD only)
- 2024–present Toyota Starlet Cross (Africa)

=== K15B-C ===
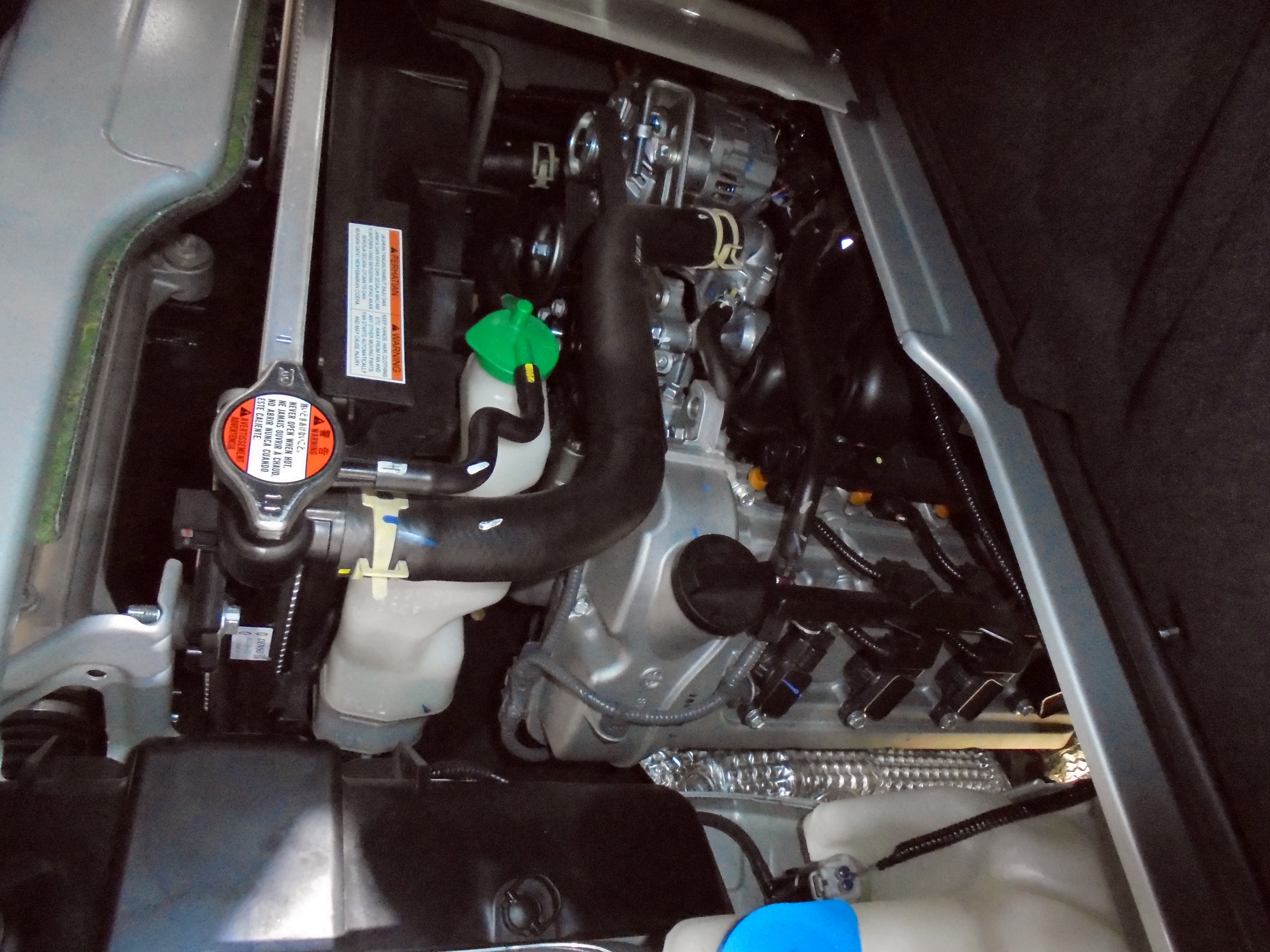
Suzuki K15B-C engine

This engine is similar as the regular K15B, but designed for commercial use. The differences are including different cylinder head cover made from metal with 7 bolts instead of resin material with 12 bolts on the regular K15B engine, different intake manifold position, shorter camshaft profile, lower compression ratio pistons, different timing chain cover design without engine mount (similar as the previous generation Suzuki Carry) and different oil pan shape.

Technical specifications:

- Displacement: 1,462 cc (1.5 L)
- Bore and stroke: 74 mm x 85 mm
- Valvetrain: DOHC, 16-valve
- Compression ratio: 10.0
- Maximum power:
  - 97 PS (71 kW; 96 hp) at 5600 rpm
- Maximum torque:
  - 135 N⋅m (14 kg⋅m; 100 lb⋅ft) at 4400 rpm

Application:

- 2019–present Suzuki Carry (International model)

=== K15C ===
Dualjet version of K15B engine, it is available in Europe and Japan with 140V strong hybrid combined to a Motor Generator Unit (MGU). Mild hybrid and CNG version is also available, the latter is only available in India.

Technical specifications:

- Displacement: 1,462 cc (1.5 L)
- Bore and stroke: 74 mm x 85 mm
- Valvetrain: DOHC, 16-valve, Dual VVT
- Compression ratio: 12.0–13.0
- Maximum power:
  - 99–103 PS (73–76 kW; 98–102 hp) at 6000 rpm
  - 87 PS (64 kW; 86 hp) at 5500 rpm (CNG)
  - 3 PS (2 kW; 3 hp) at 900 rpm (MHEV electric motor)
  - 33 PS (24 kW; 33 hp) at 5500 rpm (HEV electric motor)
  - 115 PS (85 kW; 113 hp) at 5500 rpm (petrol + HEV electric motor)
- Maximum torque:
  - 132–137 N⋅m (13–14 kg⋅m; 97–101 lb⋅ft) at 4400 rpm
  - 122 N⋅m (12 kg⋅m; 90 lb⋅ft) at 4200 rpm
  - 60 N⋅m (6 kg⋅m; 44 lb⋅ft) at 100-2000 rpm (HEV electric motor)

Application:

- 2022–present Suzuki Brezza
- 2022–present Suzuki Ertiga (India/Bangladesh)
- 2022–present Suzuki Grand Vitara/Toyota Urban Cruiser Hyryder
- 2022–2025 Suzuki SX4 S-Cross Hybrid (Europe)
- 2022–2025 Suzuki Vitara/Escudo Hybrid (Europe/Japan)
- 2022–present Suzuki XL6 (India/Bangladesh)
- 2023–present Suzuki Fronx
- 2023–present Toyota Rumion (India)
- 2025–present Suzuki Victoris

== See also ==
- List of Suzuki engines
