= Suzuki Twin =

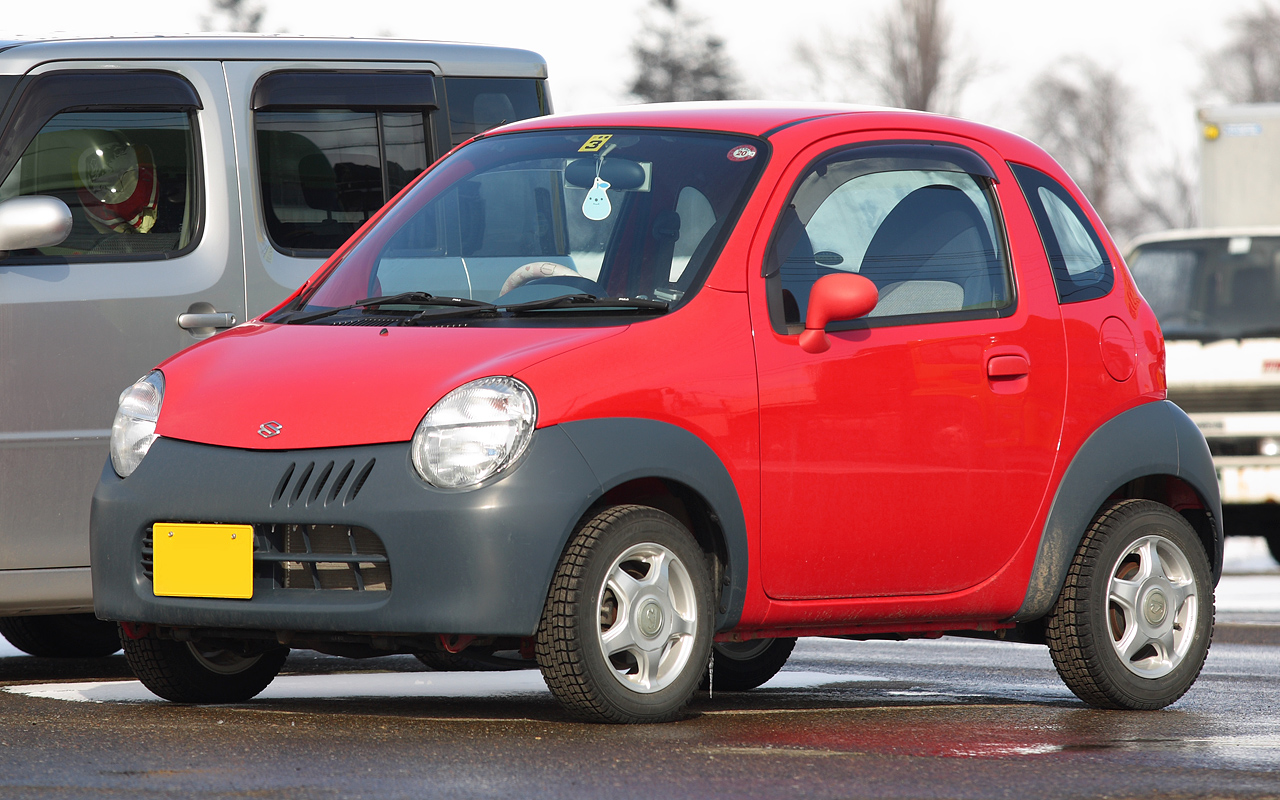

Overview
- Production: January 2003– October 2005

Body and chassis
- Class: kei car
- Body style: 2-door coupe
- Layout: front-engine, front-wheel drive

Powertrain
- Engine: 658 cc K6A I3
- Transmission: 3/4-speed automatic 5-speed manual

Dimensions
- Wheelbase: 1,800 mm (71 in)
- Length: 2,735 mm (107.7 in)
- Width: 1,475 mm (58.1 in)
- Height: 1,450 mm (57 in)
- Curb weight: 570 kg (1,257 lb) (manual); 600 kg (1,323 lb) (automatic/hybrid)

Chronology
- Successor: Suzuki Cervo (HG11S)

The Suzuki Twin is a kei car built by Suzuki and sold in Japan from January 22, 2003, until October 2005. It was available in both hybrid and non-hybrid versions, making it the first hybrid kei car available in Japan. Under the Japanese test cycle, the standard model was capable of 4.54 L/100 km (51.8 mpg_{‑US}; 62.2 mpg_{‑imp}) whereas the hybrid variant was capable of 2.93 L/100 km (80 mpg_{‑US}; 96 mpg_{‑imp}).

Designed primarily for young females, the Suzuki Twin is slightly longer than the Smart Fortwo. It featured many new and unique features including a passenger seat that could fold completely flat and become a storage tray and a single power window on the driver's side to reduce battery use and cut costs.

The Twin's design and concept were first seen in the Suzuki PU3 Commuter concept car at the Tokyo Motor Show. A near-production update was shown at the 2002 Tokyo Motor Show before finally being released in 2003.

In August 2003, motoring magazine Car and Driver test drove the Twin with mostly negative remarks. The Twin's acceleration, storage and interior furnishings were all criticized whilst its headroom and turning diameter were praised.

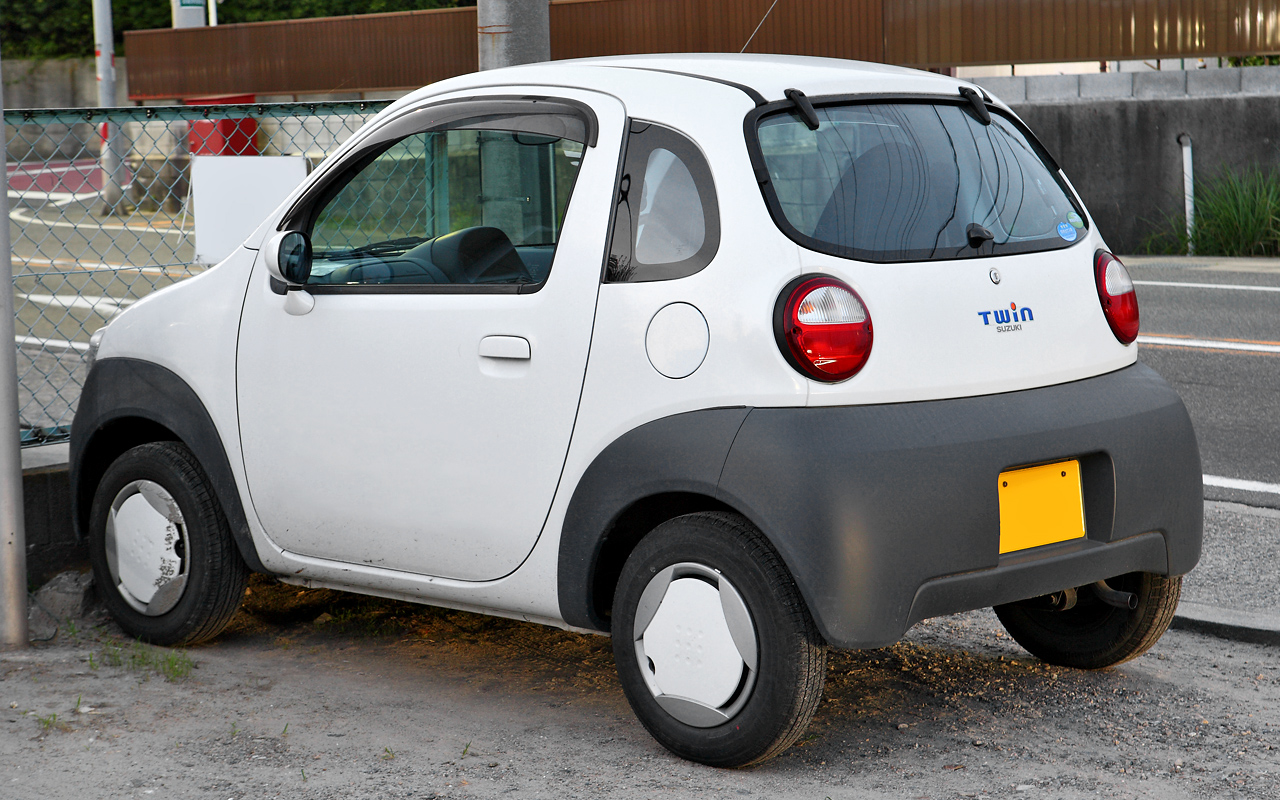
Suzuki Twin Rear view

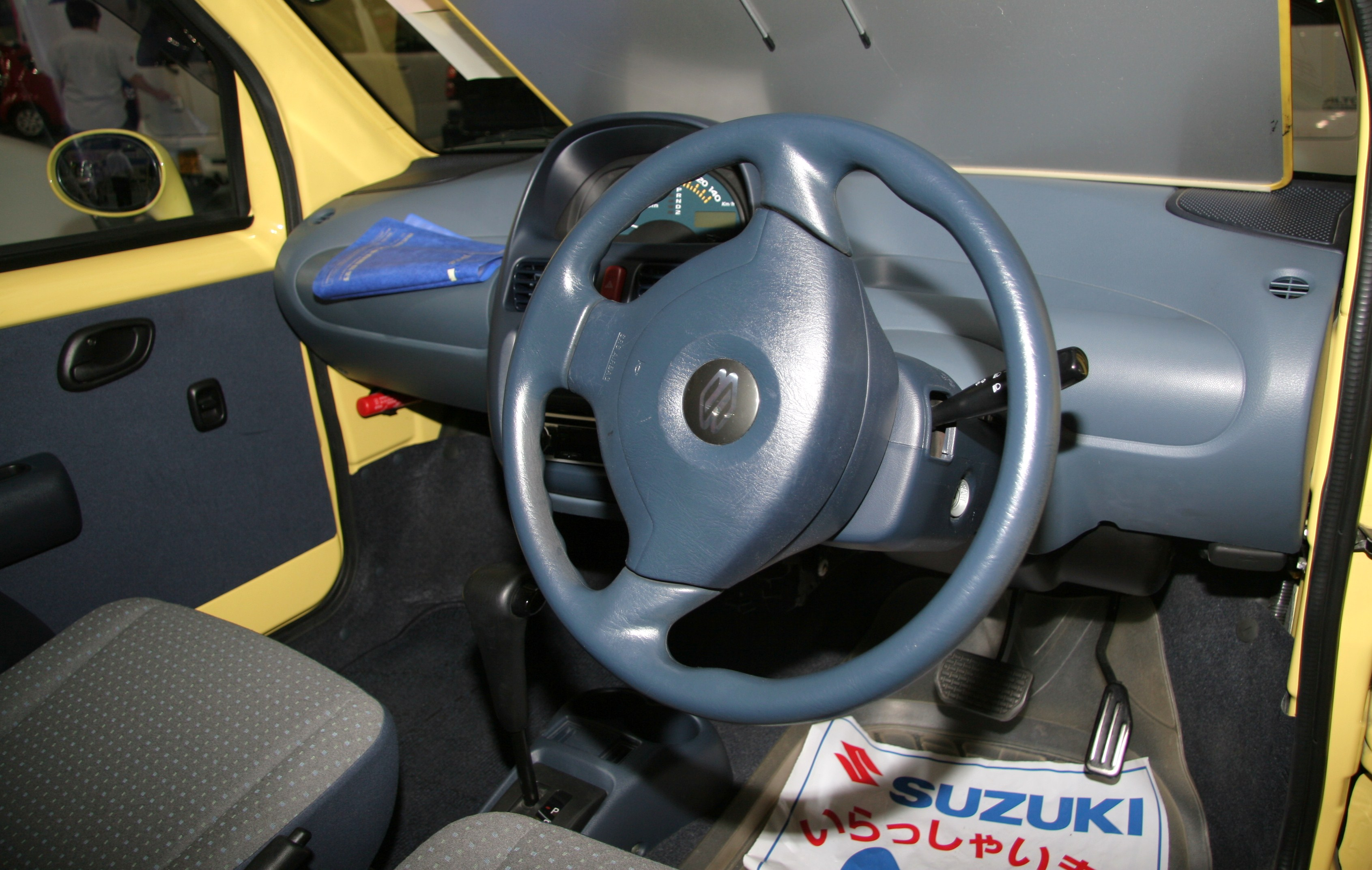
Suzuki Twin Interior

== See also ==
- List of hybrid vehicles
