= Suzuki Celerio =

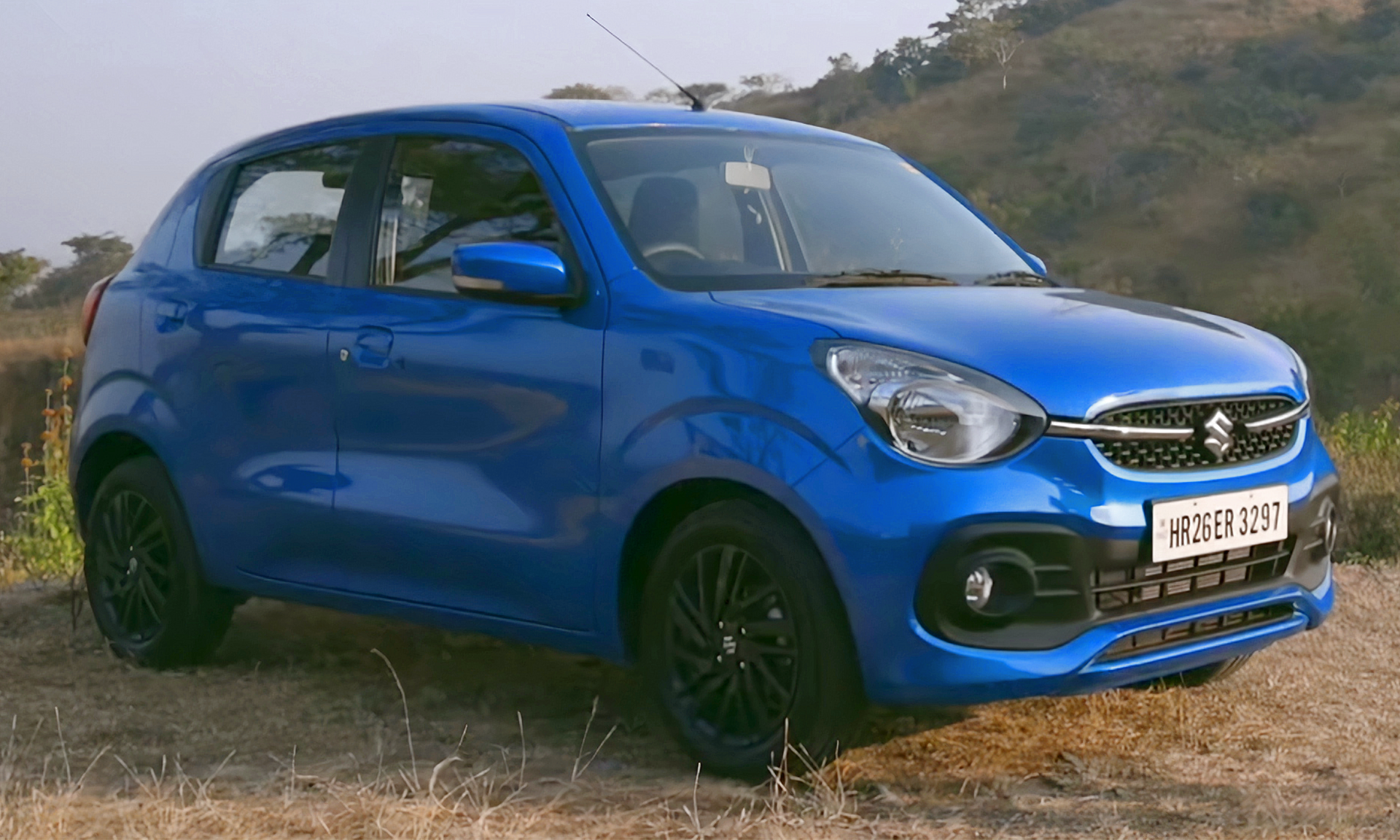
- 2021 Maruti Suzuki Celerio ZXi (India)

Overview
- Manufacturer: Suzuki
- Also called: Suzuki Alto/A-Star (2008–2013); Suzuki Cultus (Pakistan, 2017–present); Toyota Vitz (South Africa, 2023–present)
- Production: 2008–present

Body and chassis
- Class: City car (A)
- Body style: 5-door hatchback
- Layout: Front-engine, front-wheel-drive

Chronology
- Predecessor: Suzuki Zen Estilo (second generation, India); Suzuki A-Star (India); Suzuki Cultus (second generation, Pakistan)

The Suzuki Celerio is a hatchback city car produced by the Japanese manufacturer Suzuki since 2008. Originally a rebadged Alto/A-Star city car for some markets, the Celerio was made as a global nameplate and a standalone model replacing the A-Star in 2014. Suzuki unveiled the second-generation Celerio at the Auto Expo 2014 in India, after being previewed as the A:Wind concept model at the Thailand International Motor Expo in November 2013. The third-generation model was unveiled in November 2021. In 2023, the third-generation model was also marketed by Toyota in African markets as the Toyota Vitz.

== First generation (2008) ==
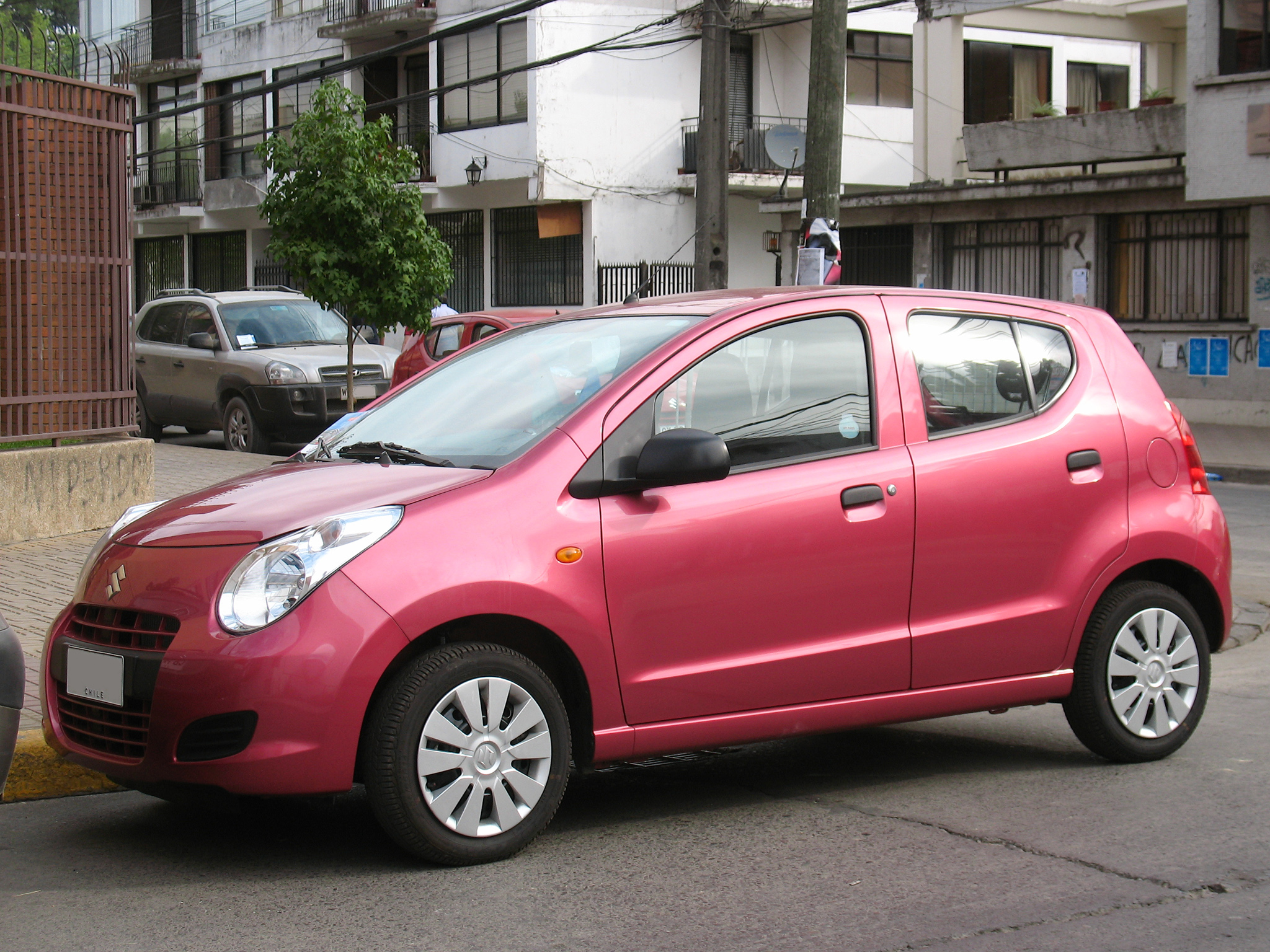
Alto/A-Star-based Celerio

Prior to being developed as a standalone model from the second generation onwards, the "Celerio" nameplate was first used for the rebadged Alto/A-Star in some markets between 2008 and 2013.

== Second generation (FE; 2014) ==
Second generation (FE)
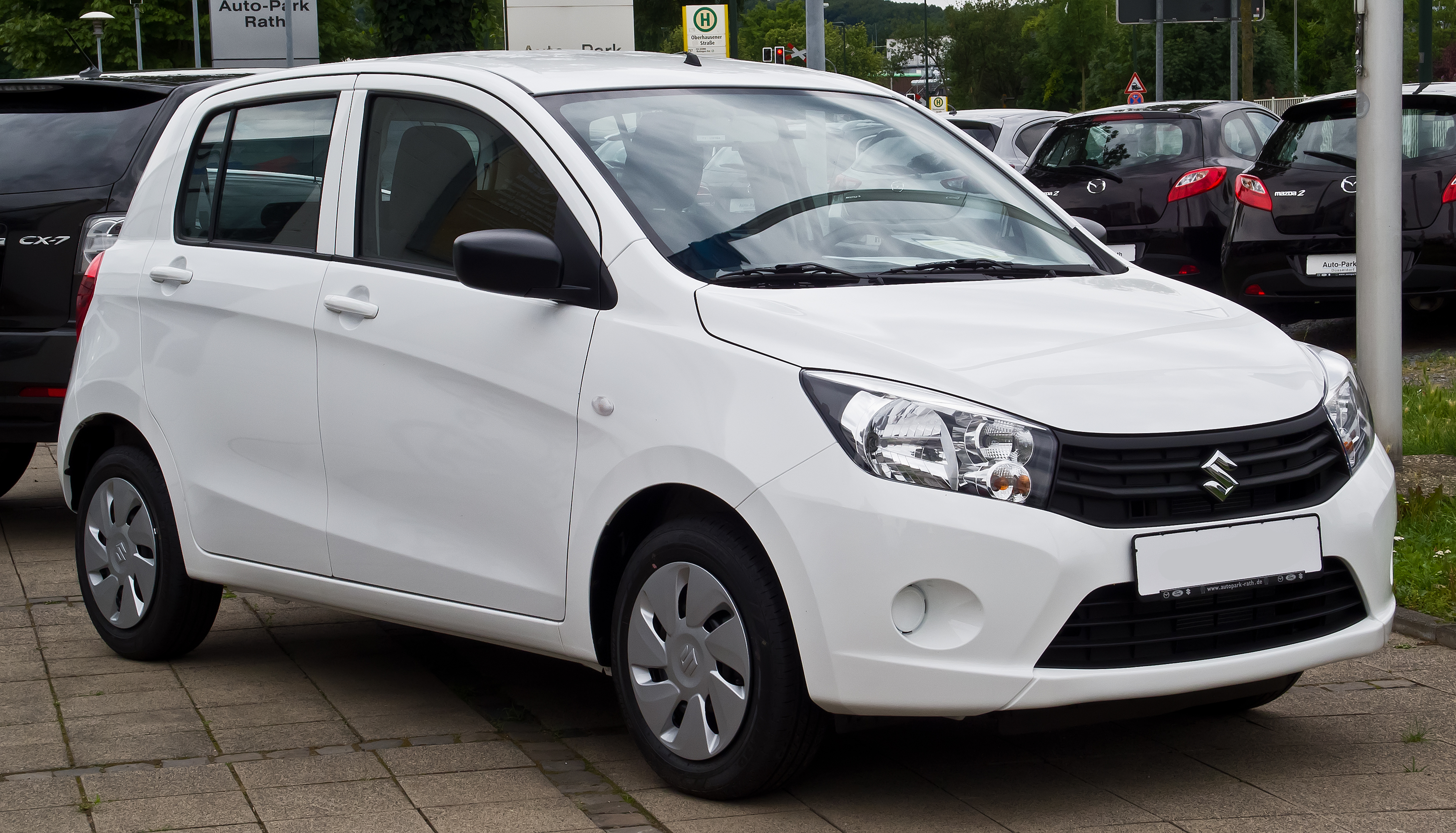
- 2015 Suzuki Celerio 1.0 Club (Germany)

Overview
- Also called: Suzuki Cultus (Pakistan)
- Production: 2014–2021 (India); 2017–present (Pakistan); 2014–2025 (Thailand)
- Assembly: India: Manesar (Maruti Suzuki); Thailand: Rayong (Suzuki Thailand); Pakistan: Karachi (Pak Suzuki Motors)

Powertrain
- Engine: Petrol: 996 cc K10B/K-Next I3; 996 cc K10C-Dual Jet PVT I3; Diesel: 793 cc E08A turbo I2
- Transmission: 5-speed manual; 5-speed AGS automated manual; CVT

Dimensions
- Wheelbase: 2,425 mm (95.5 in)
- Length: 3,600 mm (141.7 in)
- Width: 1,600 mm (63.0 in)
- Height: 1,540 mm (60.6 in)
- Curb weight: 785 kg (1,731 lb)

The second-generation Celerio was launched in India as a standalone model with six variants. The diesel version of Celerio was introduced in the second quarter of 2015. The hatchback is currently available in petrol and CNG fuel options. The Celerio X is a premium variant of Celerio with a sportier look, equipped with AGS technology, Striking X graphic and grille design.

The petrol engine is a Suzuki K-series K10B latest revision called K-Next (not same as Wagon R K10B, because Wagon R has compression ratio of 10:1 while Celerio/Cultus has 11:1). The gearbox is basically a manual transmission with a transmission control unit (TCU) that actuates the hydraulics to shift the gears.

It was launched on the European market in the second half of 2014, having its European premiere at the Geneva Motor Show in March 2014. However, the British, Irish, Australian and New Zealand market (ceased being built for UK/IE market in 2019, 2021 for Australasia) were produced in the Suzuki's Rayong manufacturing plant in Thailand. The Australasian market model lacked a fifth seatbelt.

The Pakistani version of the Celerio, using the Cultus nameplate, was launched in 2017 after the previous generation of the facelifted Suzuki Cultus was discontinued due to poor sales and an outdated exterior. Pak Suzuki Motors had launched the rebadged Celerio in three variants: VXR, VXL, and VXL AGS. While the VXR variant lacked airbags, power mirrors, ABS, and fog lights, both the VXR and VXL variants were offered with a 5-speed manual transmission, while the VXL AGS variant was offered with a 5-speed automatic gearbox. Later in 2020, Sat-Nav was also available on VXL models. This was also the first Pakistani car that had AGS technology.

The Pakistani variant of the Celerio was offered under the original name by Maruti Suzuki in India and Suzuki Motor Thailand in Rayong Province Thailand. The Celerio replaces the A-Star and Zen Estilo.

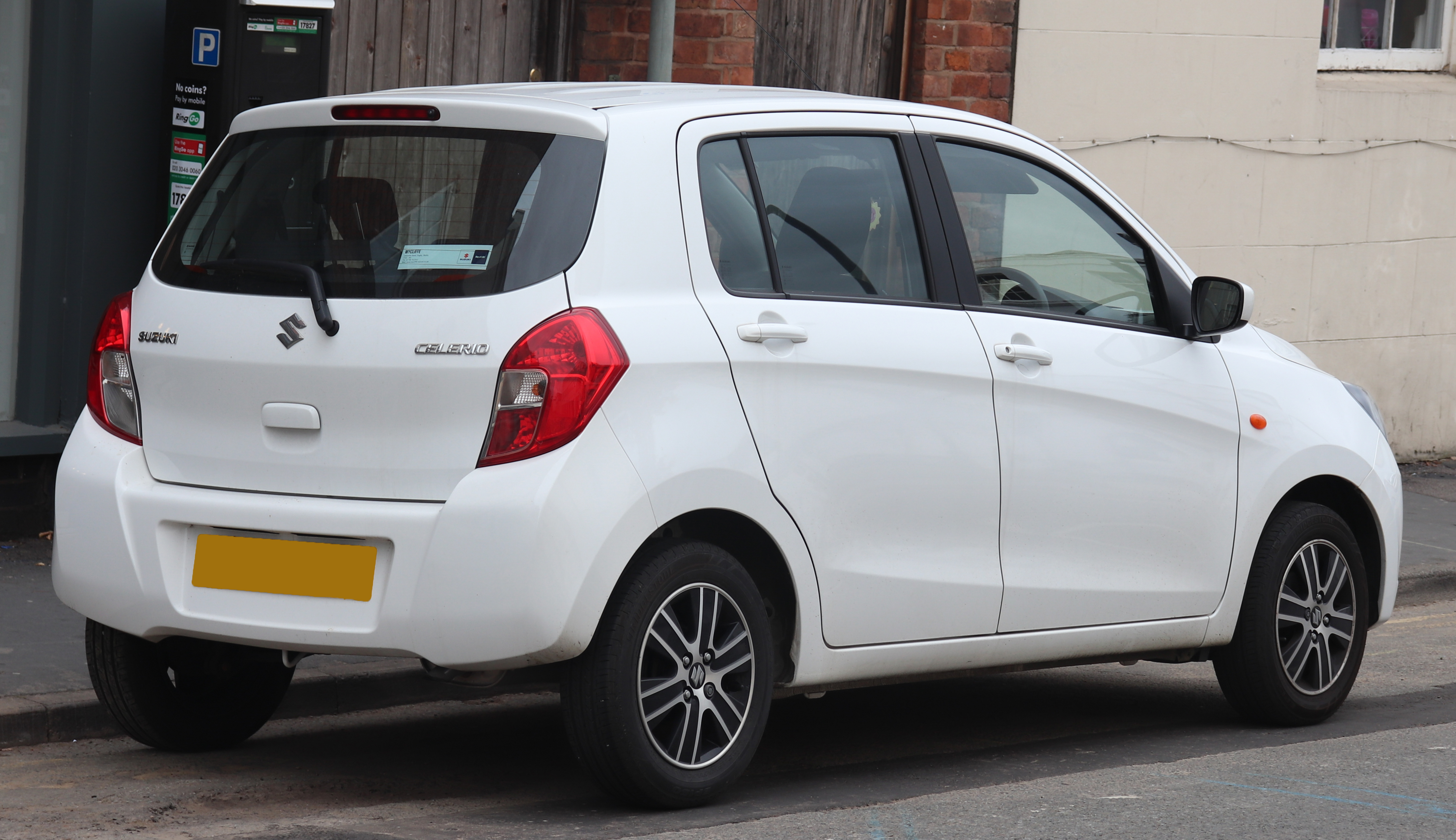
2017 Suzuki Celerio SZ4 (UK)

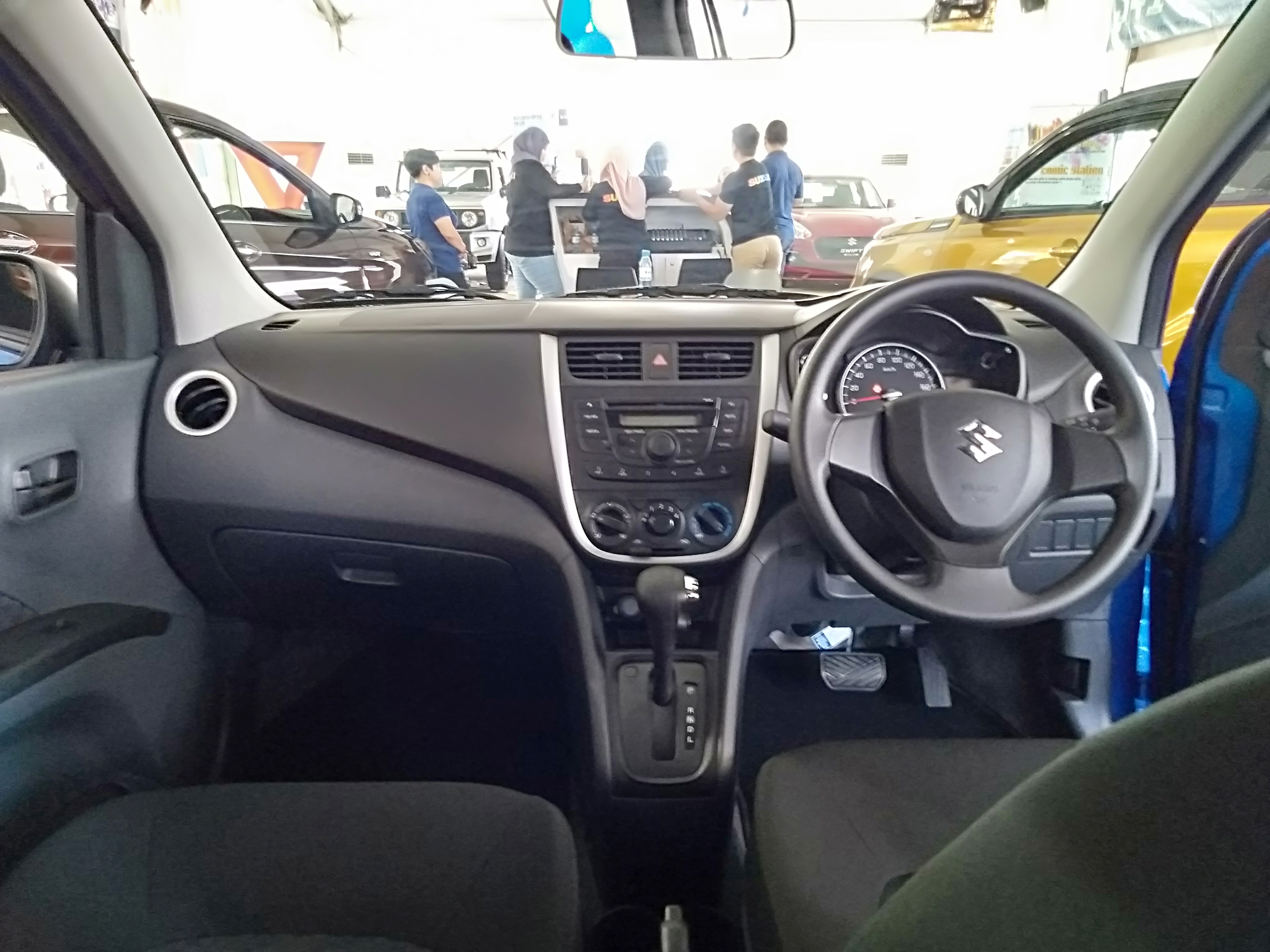
Interior

=== Safety ===
The India version of the Celerio was awarded zero stars by the Global NCAP 1.0 after a test conducted in May 2016 (similar to Latin NCAP 2013) The basic version of the Celerio in India and Pakistan does not include airbags nor ABS and the body shell of the vehicle was rated by the Global NCAP as "unstable".

Global NCAP 1.0 test results (India) Maruti Suzuki Celerio – No Airbags (2016, similar to Latin NCAP 2013)
Test	Score	Stars
Adult occupant protection	0.00/17.00	0 /5 stars
Child occupant protection	11.53/49.00	0 /5 stars

Latin NCAP 1.0 awarded the Indian-made Latin American version with 2 airbags 4 stars in 2013.

The European Suzuki Celerio scored 3 of 5 stars when tested by Euro NCAP in 2014 (similar to Latin NCAP 2020) and 4 of 5 by ANCAP in 2015. ANCAP and Euro NCAP received criticism claiming they underscored the Celerio relative to other cars that had fewer airbags or performed worse in crash tests.

ANCAP test results Suzuki Celerio (2015)
Test	Score
Overall	4 /5 stars
Frontal offset	13.58/16
Side impact	16/16
Pole	Not Assessed
Seat belt reminders	3/3
Whiplash protection	Good
Pedestrian protection	Adequate
Electronic stability control	Standard

=== Diesel ===
Maruti Suzuki introduced its all new 793 cc diesel engine in the Celerio on 3 June 2015, at a price of INR 4.65 lacs. The Celerio DDiS125 is powered by Suzuki’s first indigenously developed two-cylinder motor which delivers 49 hp; 37 kW (50 PS) of max power and 125 Nm of peak torque. It also promises to deliver a segment best mileage of 3.6 L/100 km (27.62 km/L).

Externally, the Celerio diesel is identical to its petrol version. The Celerio diesel variant was discontinued in February 2017.

== Third generation (2021) ==
Third generation
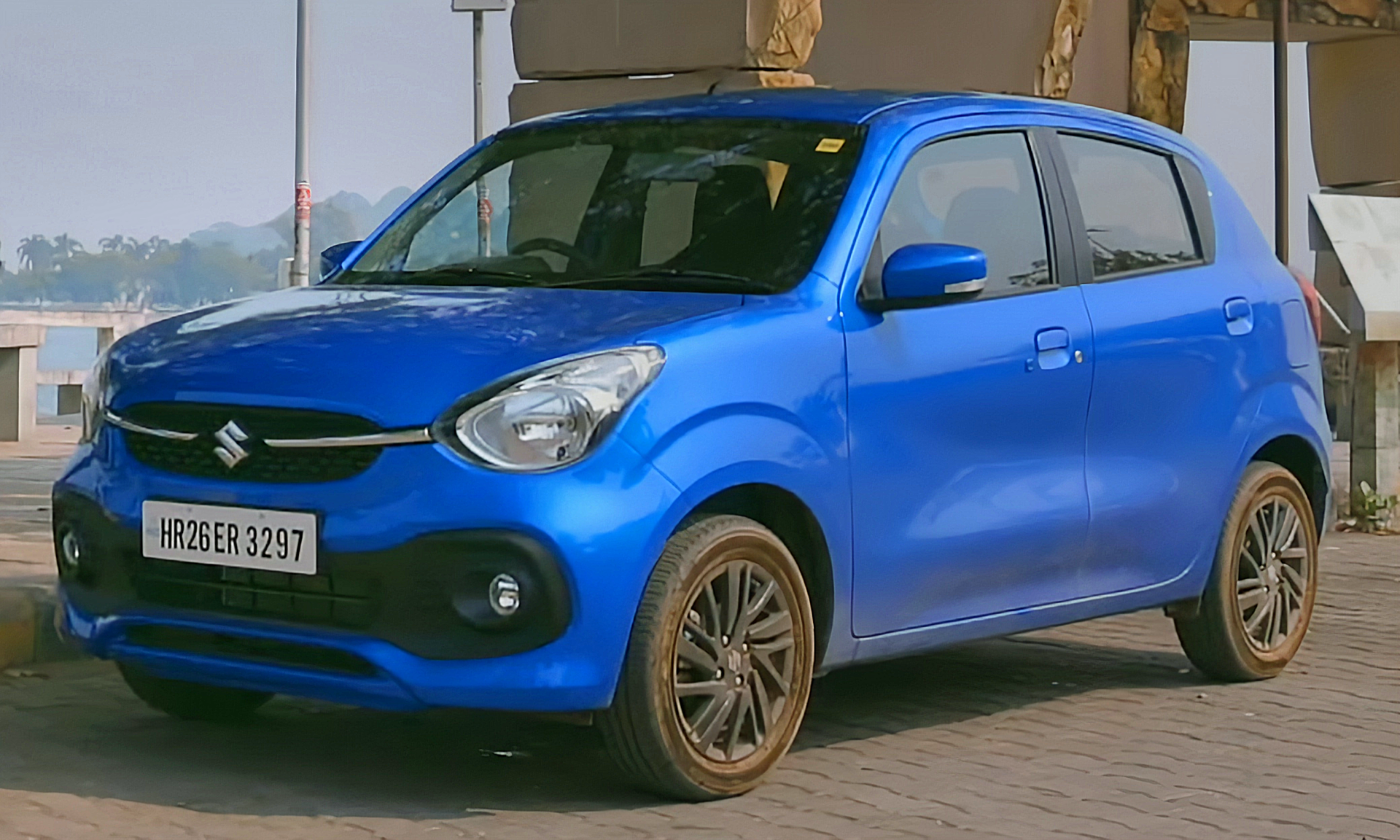
- 2021 Maruti Suzuki Celerio ZXi+ (India)

Overview
- Also called: Toyota Vitz (Southern Africa)
- Production: 2021–present
- Assembly: India: Manesar (Maruti Suzuki)
- Designer: Takashi Maeda

Body and chassis
- Platform: Suzuki HEARTECT platform
- Related: Maruti Suzuki Wagon R (third generation); Suzuki Ignis (second generation)

Powertrain
- Engine: Petrol: 998 cc K10C Dualjet I3 VVT
- Transmission: 5-speed "AGS" AMT; 5-speed manual

Dimensions
- Wheelbase: 2,435 mm (95.9 in)
- Length: 3,695 mm (145.5 in)
- Width: 1,655 mm (65.2 in)
- Height: 1,555 mm (61.2 in)
- Curb weight: 800–825 kg (1,764–1,819 lb)

Chronology
- Predecessor: Toyota Agya (Vitz, South Africa)

The third-generation Celerio was unveiled in India on 10 November 2021. The car is built on lightweight HEARTECT platform that also underpins Wagon R and Ignis. It is powered with a 1.0-liter K10C Dualjet engine which is a reworked K10B engine with dual fuel injectors per cylinder (Dual VVT) and several other modifications.

In January 2023, the third-generation Celerio was introduced in South Africa and some other RHD Southern Africa markets under the Toyota brand as the Toyota Vitz. Reusing the nameplate from the older Japanese market Yaris, the Vitz replaced the Agya as Toyota's entry level, A-segment car in the country.

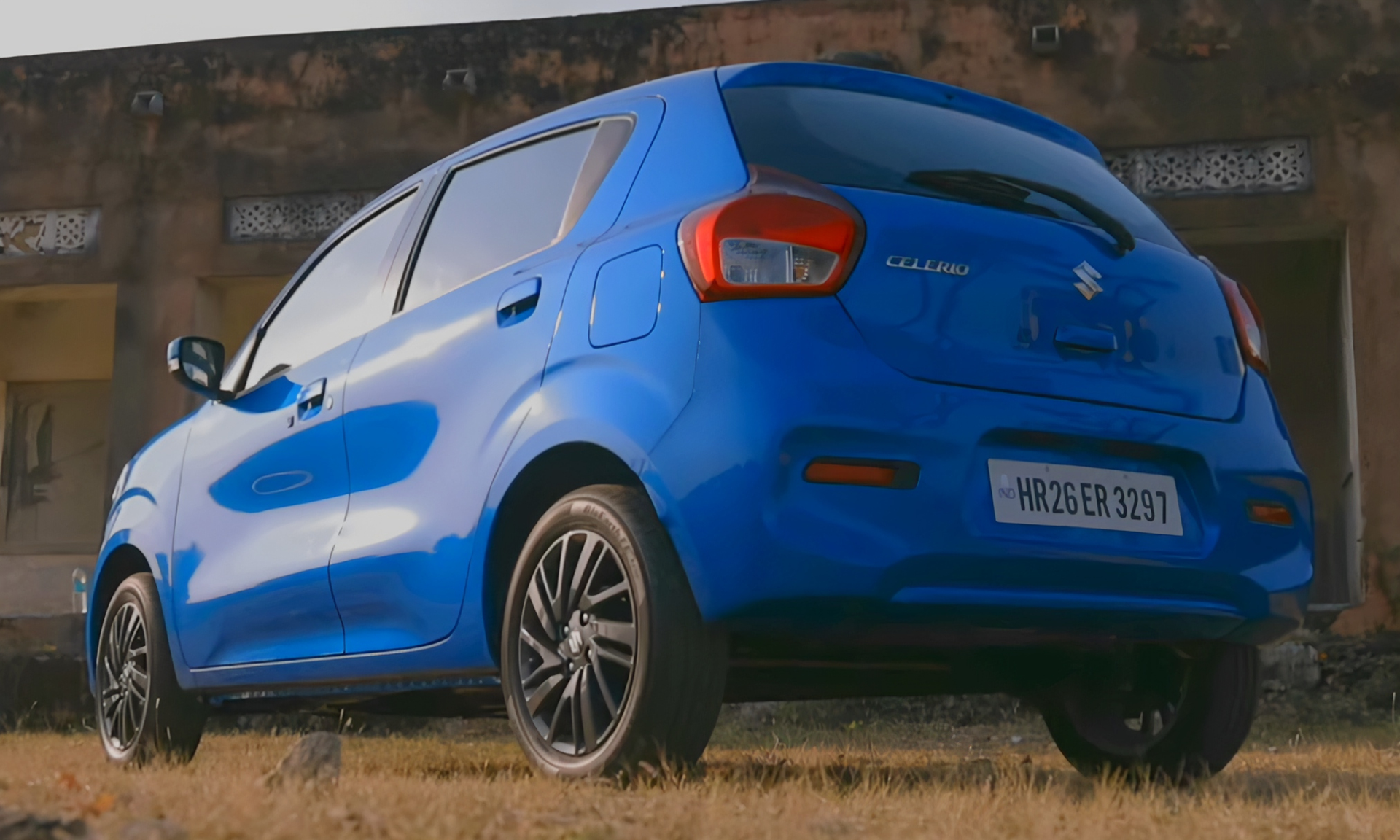
Rear view

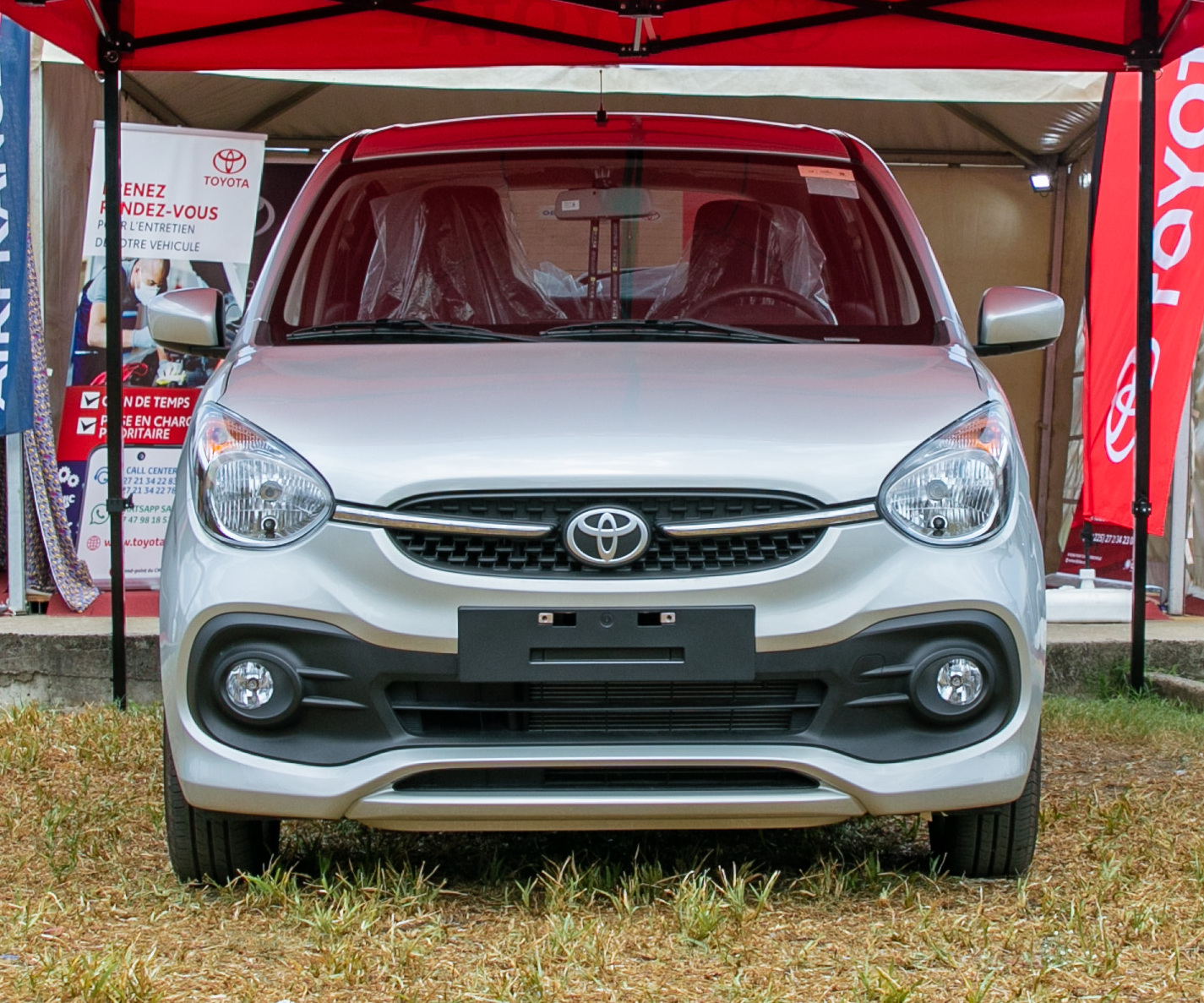
2023 Toyota Vitz (South Africa)

=== Safety ===
==== Global NCAP ====
The Celerio for India with 2 airbags received 2 stars for adult occupants and 1 star for toddlers from Global NCAP 2.5 in a December 2025 testing (similar to Latin NCAP 2019).

Global NCAP 2.5 test results (India) Maruti Suzuki Celerio (2 airbags) (December 2025, similar to Latin NCAP 2019)
Test	Score	Stars
Adult occupant protection	18.04/34.00	2 /5 stars
Child occupant protection	9.52/49.00	1 /5 stars

The Celerio for India with 6 airbags received 3 stars for adult occupants and 2 stars for toddlers from Global NCAP 2.5 in a December 2025 testing (similar to Latin NCAP 2019).

Global NCAP 2.5 test results (India) Maruti Suzuki Celerio (6 airbags) (December 2025, similar to Latin NCAP 2019)
Test	Score	Stars
Adult occupant protection	18.04/34.00	3 /5 stars
Child occupant protection	18.57/49.00	2 /5 stars

== Sales ==
Year	India	Thailand
2014	67,616	1,862
2015	82,961	2,487
2016	90,481	1,187
2017	100,860	922
2018	100,957	
2019	82,961	
2020		4,351
