= Chana Eulove =

Chinese compact MPV

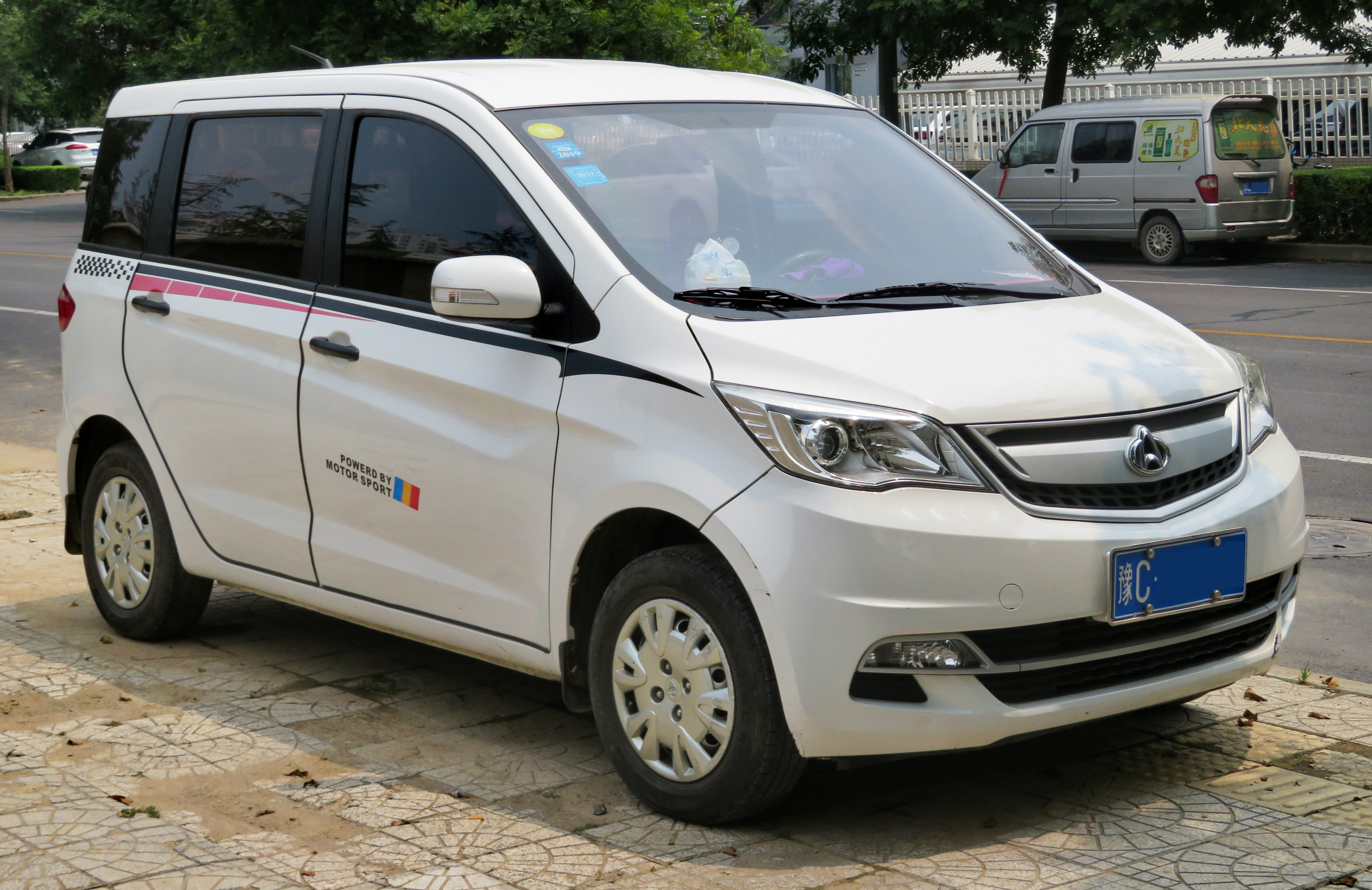
- Chana Eulove

Overview
- Manufacturer: Changan Automobile
- Production: 2013–2015; 2015–2018 (EV)
- Model years: 2013–2015; 2015–2018 (EV)

Body and chassis
- Class: Compact MPV
- Body style: 5-door wagon
- Layout: Front-engine, front-wheel-drive

Powertrain
- Engine: 1.2 L I4 (turbo petrol); 1.4 L I4 (petrol)
- Transmission: 5-speed manual 5-speed automatic

Dimensions
- Wheelbase: 2,505 mm (98.6 in)
- Length: 3,800 mm (149.6 in)
- Width: 1,700 mm (66.9 in)
- Height: 1,680 mm (66.1 in)

The Chana Eulove or Ouliwei (欧力威) is a Compact MPV produced by Changan Automobile under the Chana brand.

== Overview ==
The Chana Eulove is a CDV (car-derived van) based on the VOSS concept unveiled at the 2011 Shanghai Auto Show. The Chana Eulove was designed by Changan Automobile’s office in Turin, Italy with a development code of F101. Prices ranges from 39,800 to 65,900 yuan.

The production model of the Chana Eulove was debuted in November 2012 at the 2012 Guangzhou Auto Show and hit the market in April 2013. 46,005 units of the Chana Eulove were sold in China in 2014.

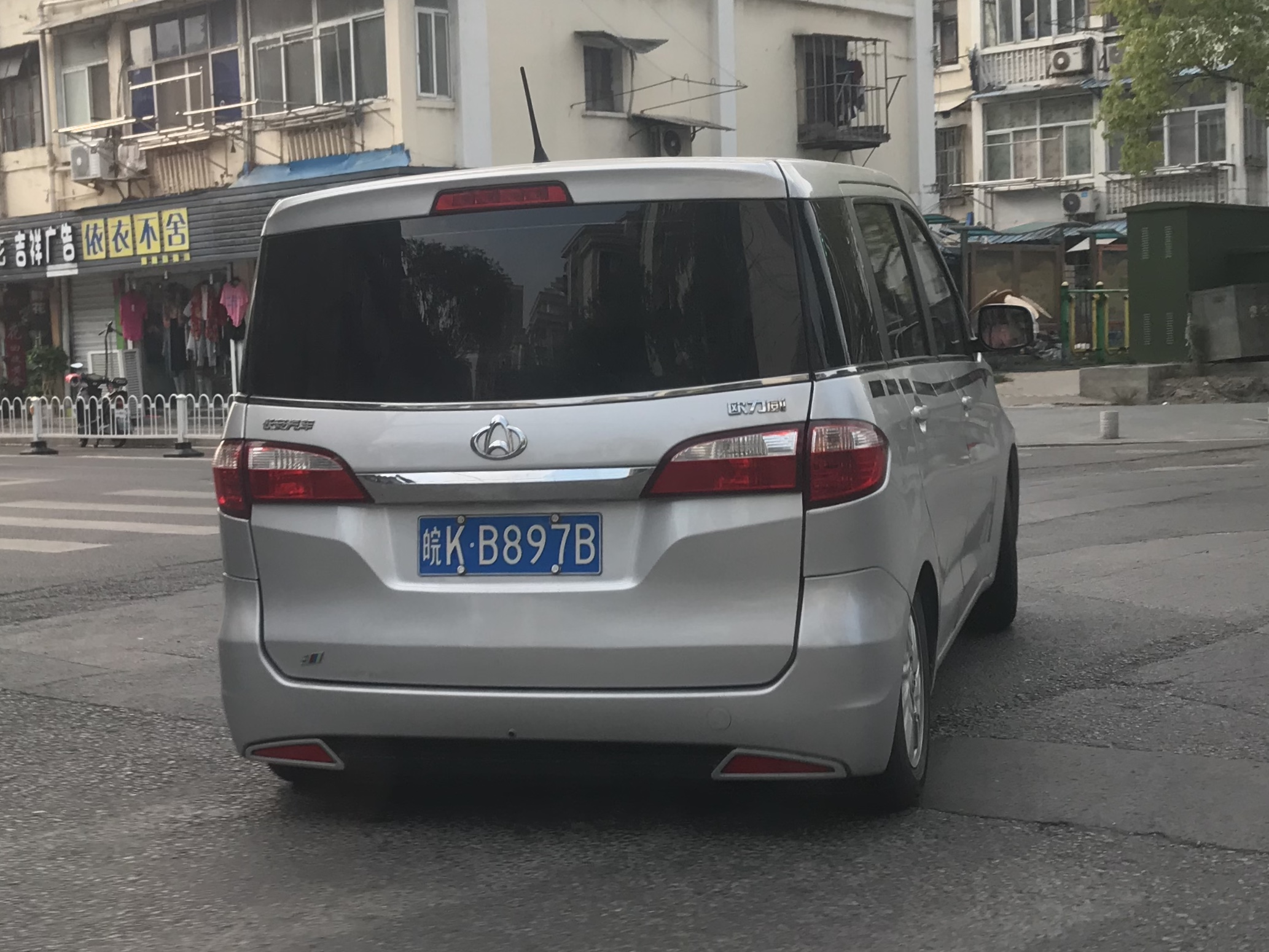
Chana Eulove rear

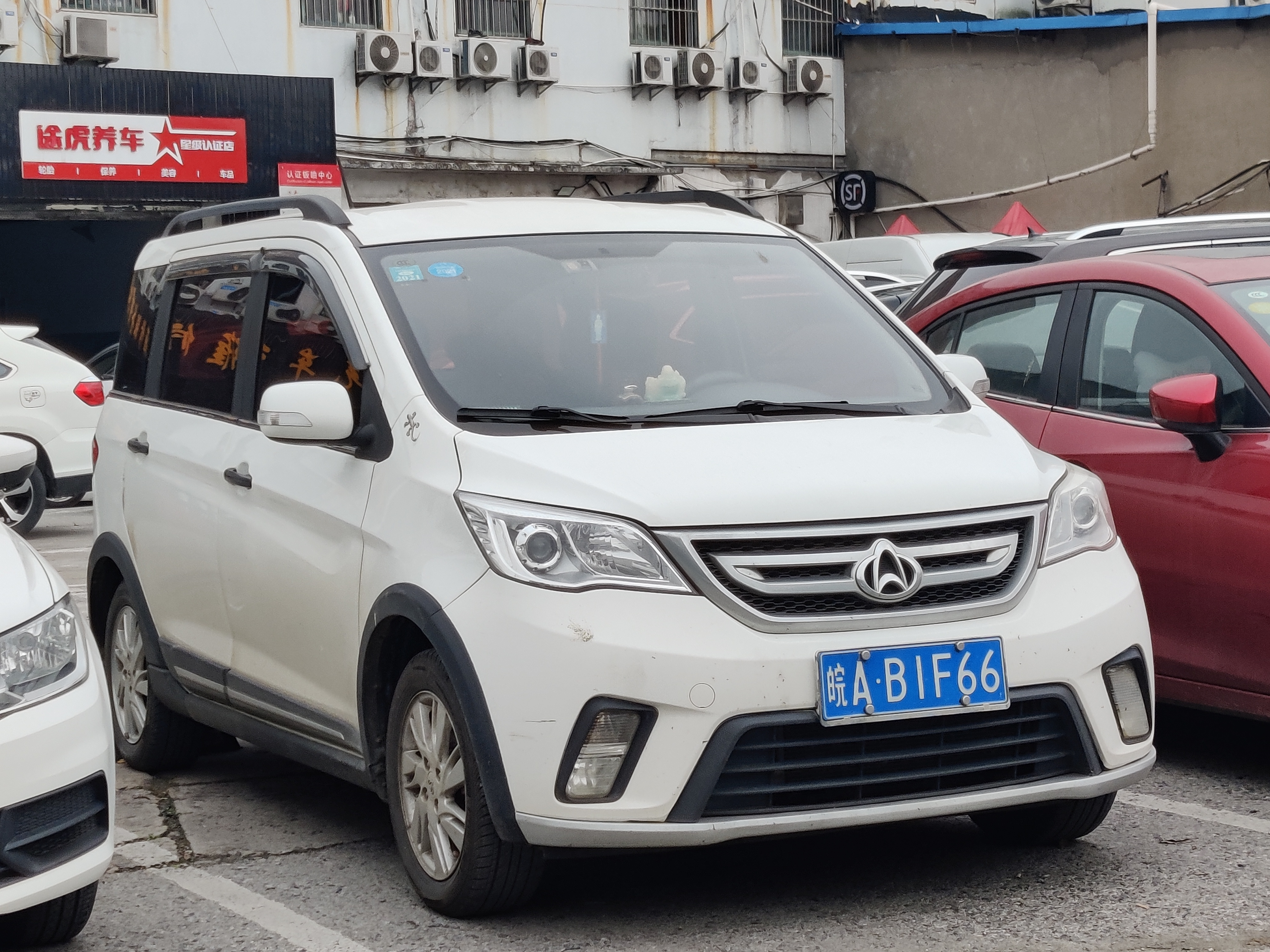
Chana Eulove Sport Edition

== Chana Eulove X6 ==
In March 2015, Changan released a crossover version of the Eulove MPV, called the Chana Eulove X6.

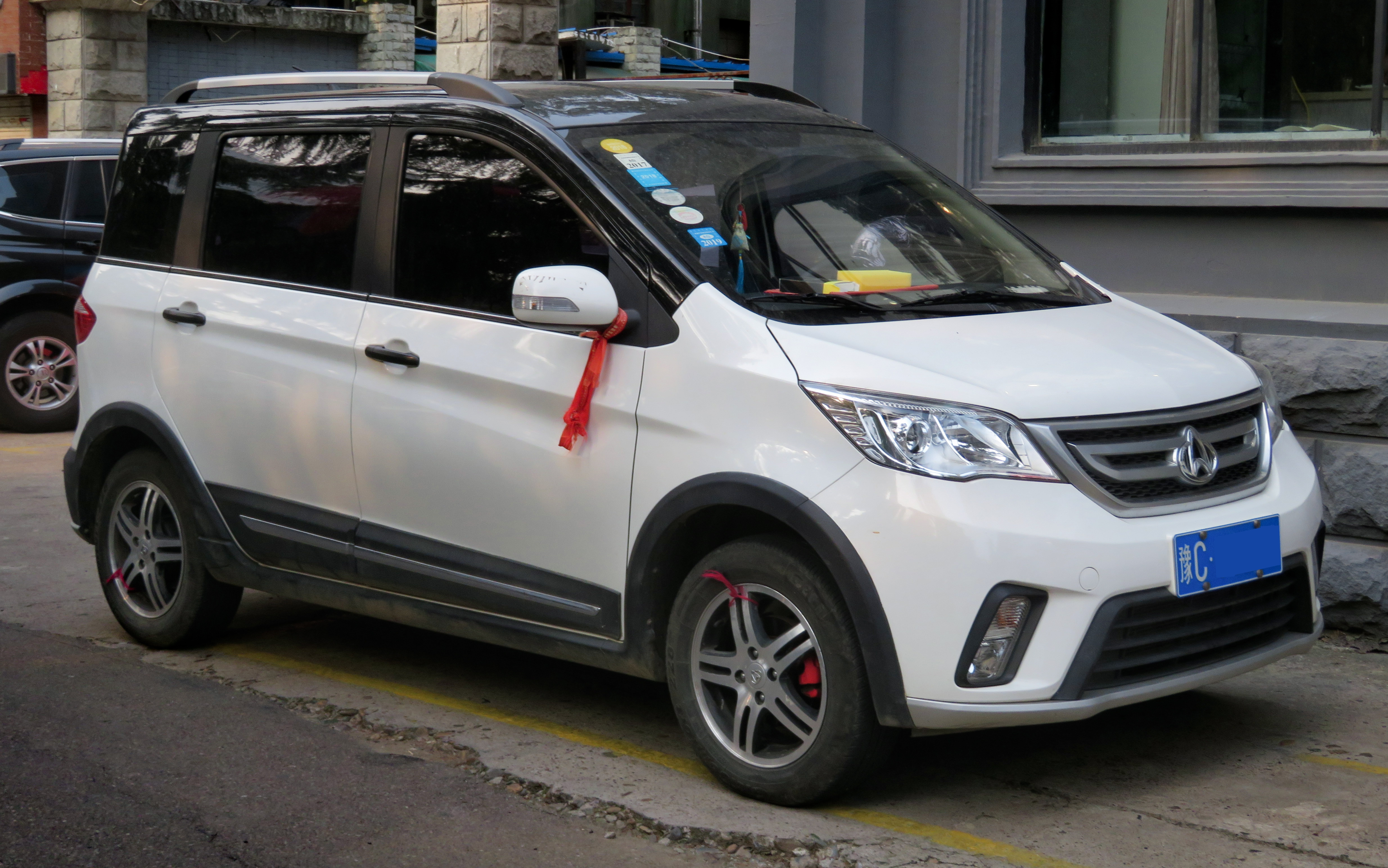
Chana Eulove X6 front

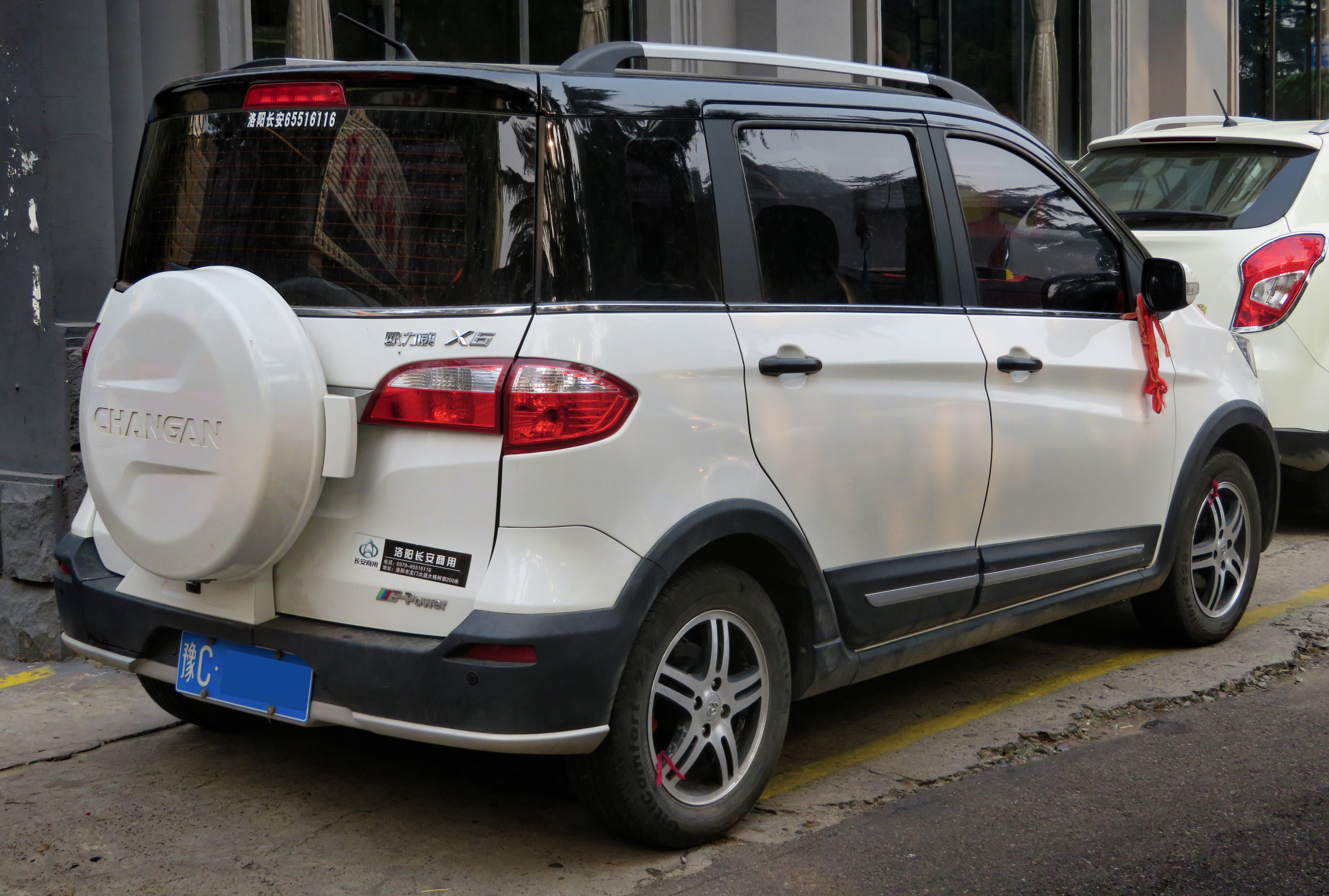
Chana Eulove X6 rear

== Chana Eulove EV ==
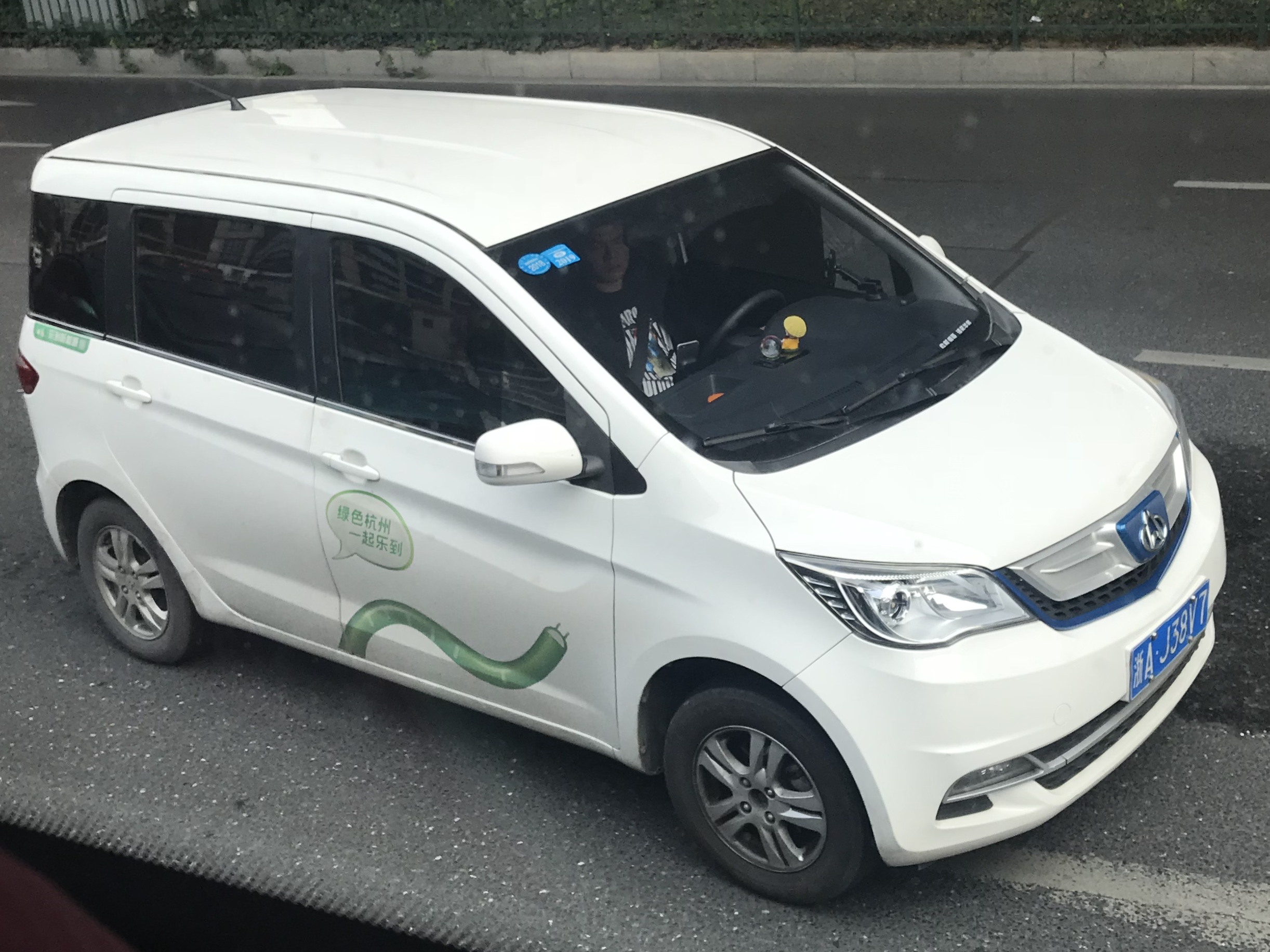
Chana Eulove EV

Starting from 2017, an electric version called the Eulove EV was also available producing 67kW and 240 Nm of torque. As of 2018, the Eulove EV is packed with a 34.6 to 43 kWh battery with a range of 252 to 315 kilometers. The Internal combustion engine version was discontinued after the 2015 model year while the electric version was available to car sharing platforms throughout 2018 with a price range of 158,000 to 159,800 yuan.
