= Suzuki Solio =

Mini MPV produced by Suzuki

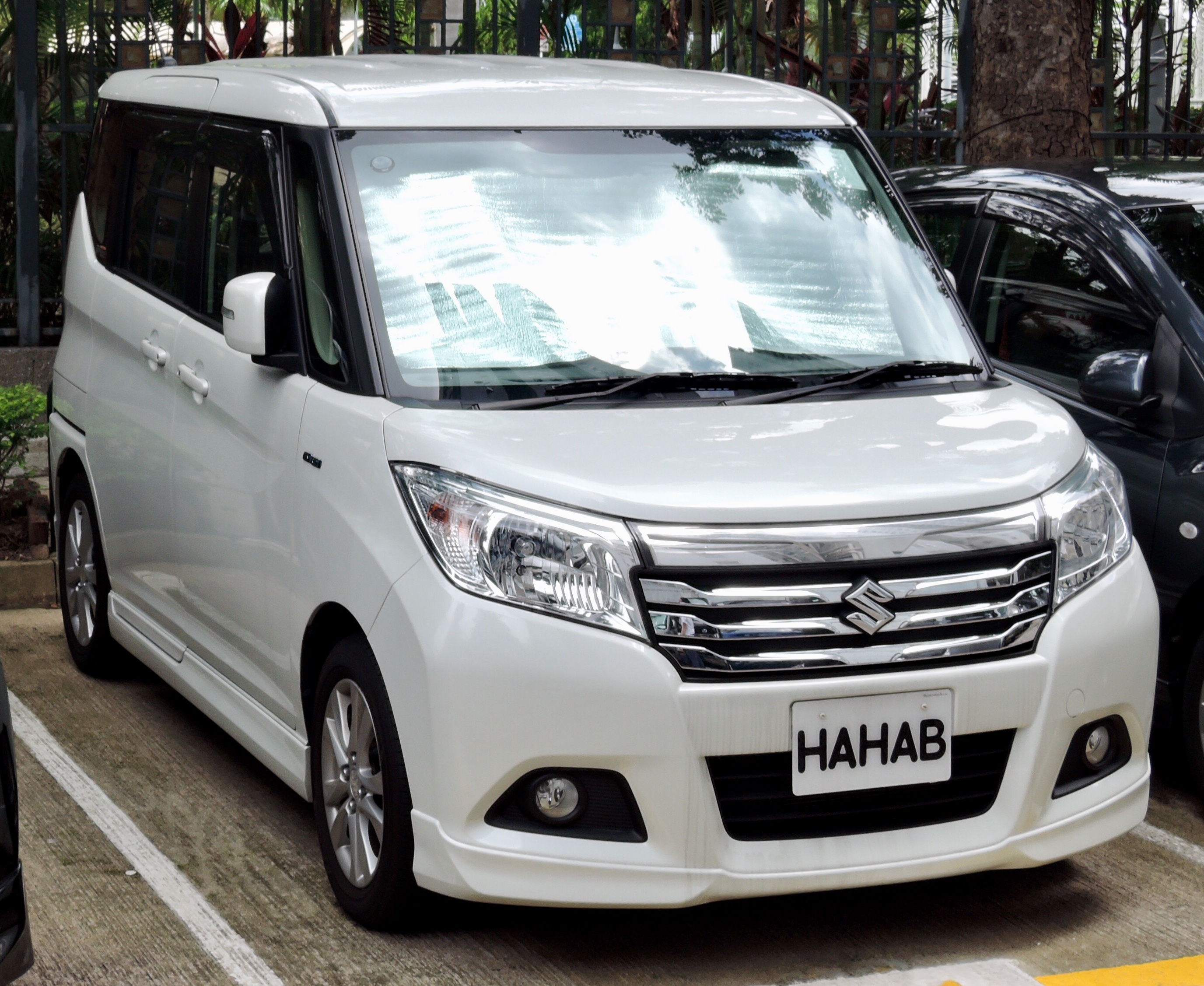
- 2016 Suzuki Solio Hybrid

Overview
- Manufacturer: Suzuki
- Also called: Suzuki Wagon R+
- Production: 1997–present

Body and chassis
- Class: Mini MPV
- Body style: 5-door hatchback (1997–2010); 5-door minivan (2010–present)
- Layout: Front-engine, front-wheel-drive; Front-engine, four-wheel-drive (Japan only)

The Suzuki Solio (Japanese: スズキ・ソリオ, Suzuki Sorio) is a mini MPV produced and marketed by Suzuki since 1997. The preceding model and the first generation Solio were derived from the narrower Wagon R; it was widened mainly for export markets and was originally sold as the Wagon R-Wide or Wagon R Plus.

== Predecessor: Wagon R-Wide (MA61S/MB61S; 1997) ==
Suzuki Wagon R-Wide
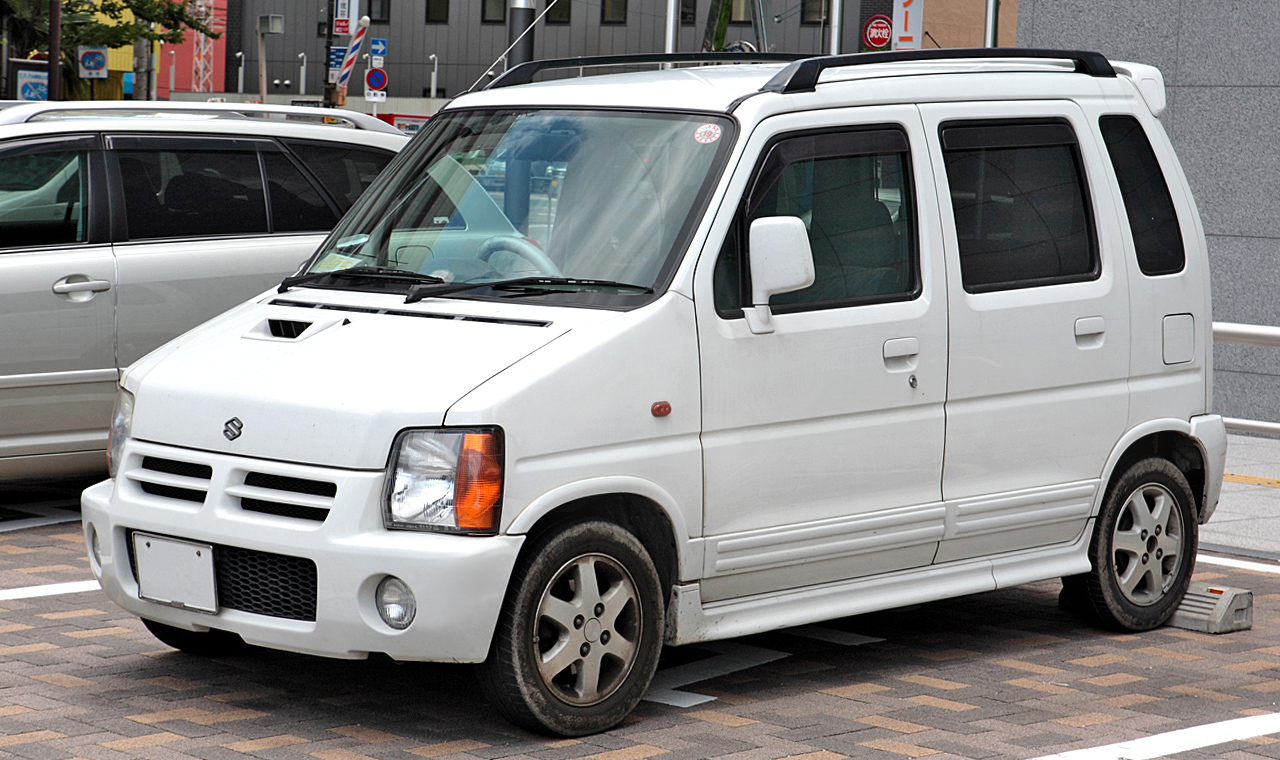
- Suzuki Wagon R-Wide (pre-facelift, Japan)

Overview
- Model code: MA61S/MB61S
- Also called: Suzuki Wagon R+ (Europe); Suzuki Karimun (Indonesia); Changhe Beidouxing (China); Foton Digo Express Delivery EV (China); Chevrolet Wagon R+ (Colombia); Suzuki Beidouxing (China)
- Production: February 1997 – May 1999 (Japan); 2004–2022 (China); 1999–2001 (Colombia); 1998–2006 (Indonesia)
- Assembly: Japan: Sagara Plant, Shizuoka Prefecture; China: Jiangxi, China; Colombia: Bogotá (GM Colmotores); Indonesia: Bekasi Regency (SIM)

Body and chassis
- Class: City car/Mini MPV
- Body style: 5-door hatchback
- Layout: Front-engine, front-wheel-drive or four-wheel-drive
- Related: Suzuki Wagon R (first generation)

Powertrain
- Engine: Petrol: 970 cc F10A I4 (Indonesia & China); 996 cc K10A DOHC I4; 996 cc K10A DOHC turbo I4; 1171 cc K12A DOHC I4 (Europe); 1373 cc K14B DOHC I4 (China)
- Transmission: 4-speed automatic 5-speed manual

Dimensions
- Wheelbase: 2,355 mm (92.7 in)
- Length: 3,400–3,470 mm (133.9–136.6 in)
- Width: 1,575 mm (62.0 in)
- Height: 1,670–1,705 mm (65.7–67.1 in)
- Curb weight: 810–880 kg (1,786–1,940 lb)

Chronology
- Successor: Suzuki Karimun Estilo (Indonesia)

The predecessor to the Solio, the Wagon R-Wide, was introduced in February 1997, as a slightly larger version of the Wagon R, exceeding the kei car specifications, with larger engines of 1 or 1.2 litres. The Wagon R-Wide was sold as the Wagon R+ in the European market (also introduced in the same year) with the atmospheric versions of the 1.0 K10A and the 1.2 K12A. The only other tall wagon style car sold in Europe around the time of its introduction was the Daihatsu Move. The car was made in Japan. It was not galvanised and it was prone to rust, especially in the sills, after years of use in Central and Northern Europe. The Wagon R-Wide was slightly facelifted in May 1998, and this updated Wagon R-Wide was also sold in Europe under Wagon R+. In Europe, the first-generation Wagon R+ was sold from 1997 until May 2000.

The engines were the 996 cc K10A, in naturally aspirated or turbocharged forms, or the later 1171 cc naturally aspirated K12A. The naturally aspirated K10A produces 65 PS (48 kW) and 88 Nm. The turbocharged version was only available in Japan, New Zealand, and Australia; it puts out 100 PS (74 kW) and 118 Nm. The 1.2-litre K12A engine produces 70 PS (51 kW) and 93 Nm. The larger engine was the only one offered in conjunction with four-wheel drive in Europe.

Between 1999 and 2001, it was also built in Colombia by GM Colmotores, who sold it as the Chevrolet Wagon R+. This was equipped with the naturally aspirated K10A four-cylinder engine.

In Indonesia, the facelifted Japanese Wagon R-Wide was sold as the Suzuki Karimun and was produced locally from 1999 until 2006 and offered with a 1.0-litre petrol engine, whilst in China it forms the base for Changhe Beidouxing. The Big Dipper is available with an indigenously built 1.0-litre engine based on the old F10A, or with the more modern 1.4-litre K14B engine.

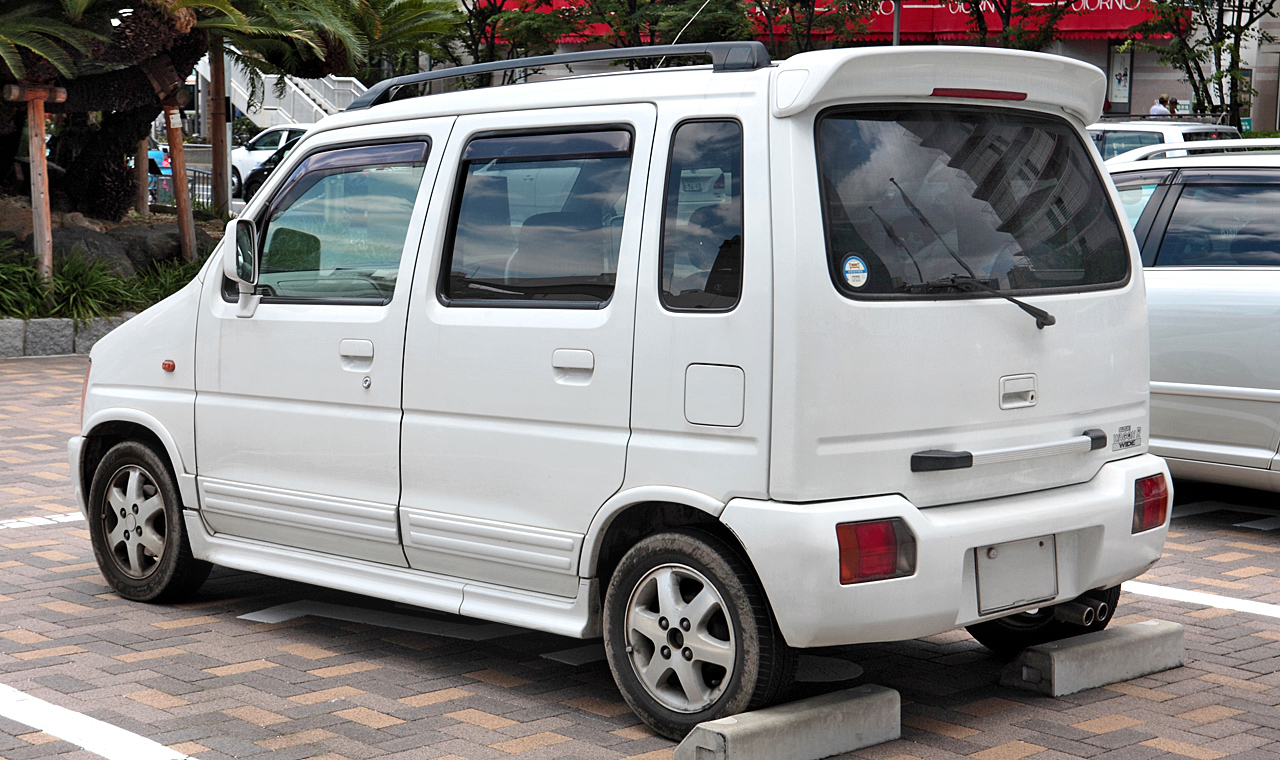
Suzuki Wagon R-Wide (pre-facelift, Japan)

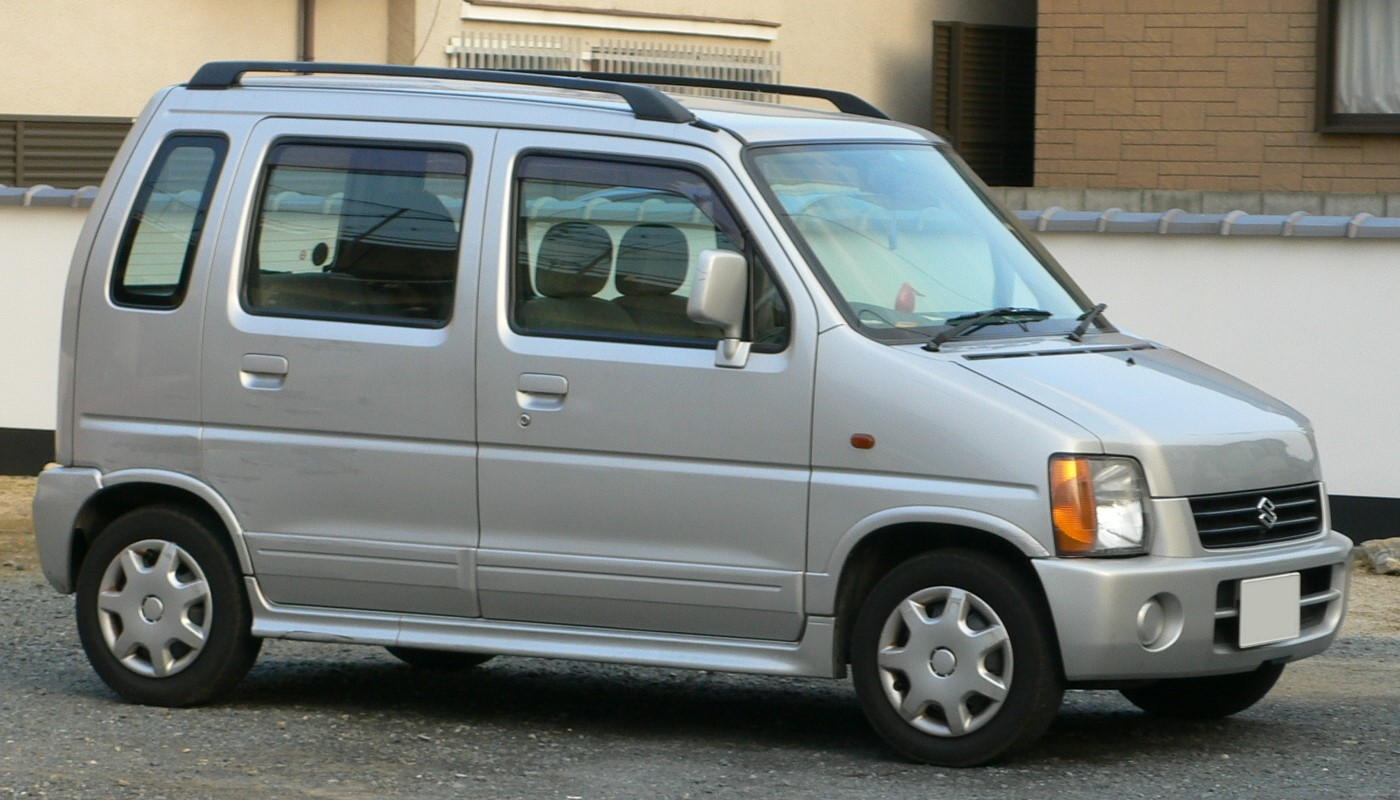
Suzuki Wagon R-Wide (facelift, Japan)

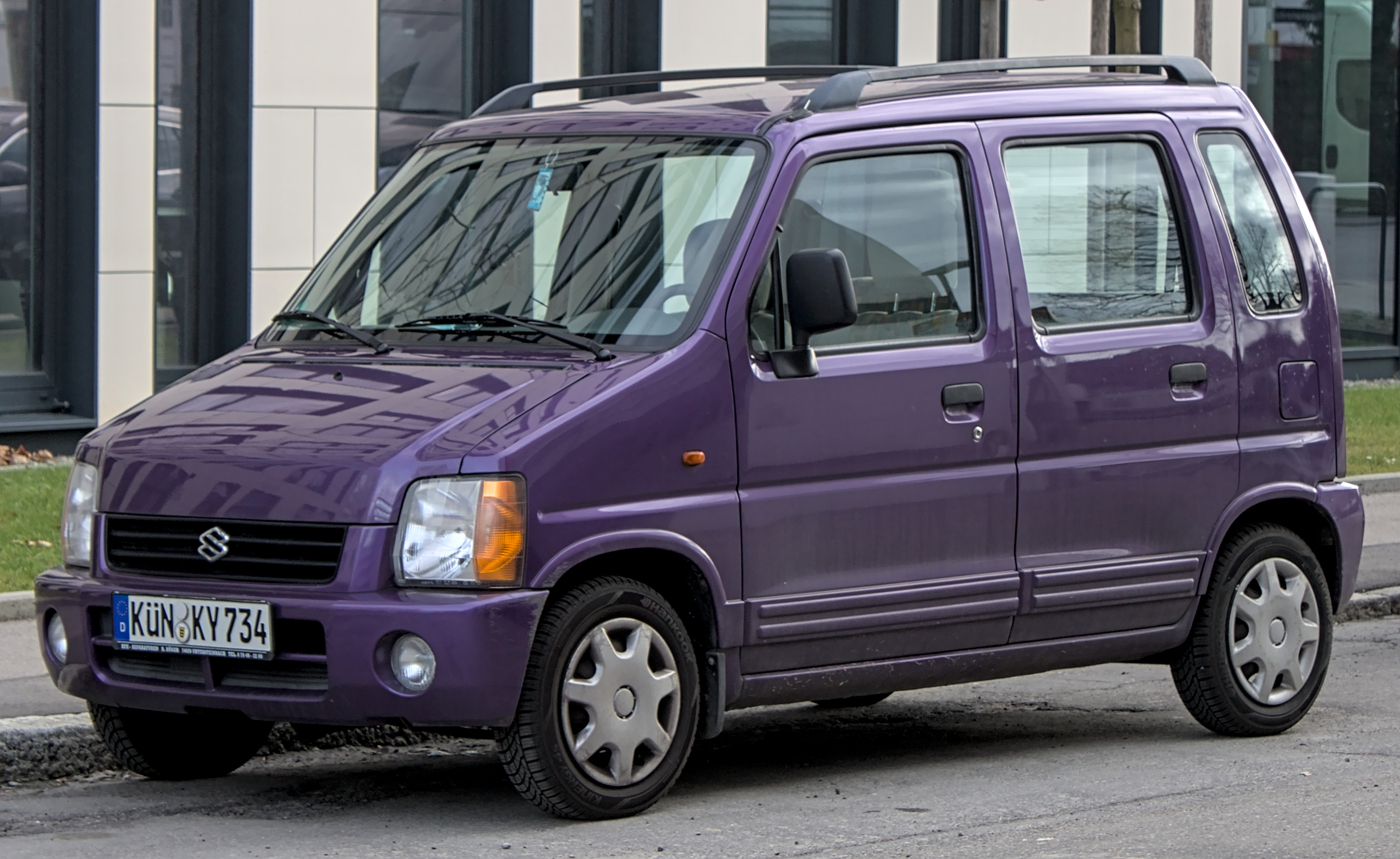
Suzuki Wagon R+ (facelift, Germany)

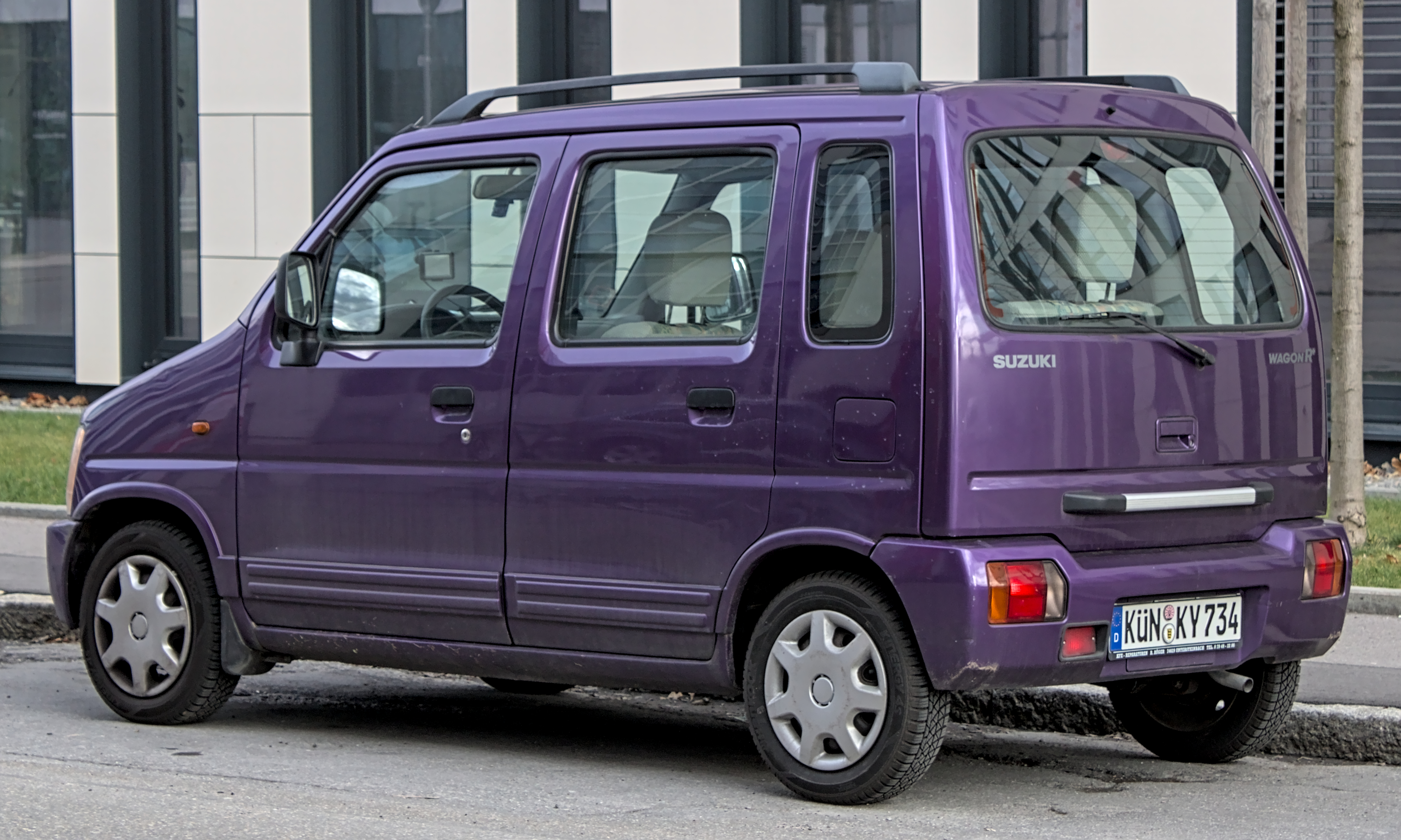
Suzuki Wagon R+ (facelift, Germany)

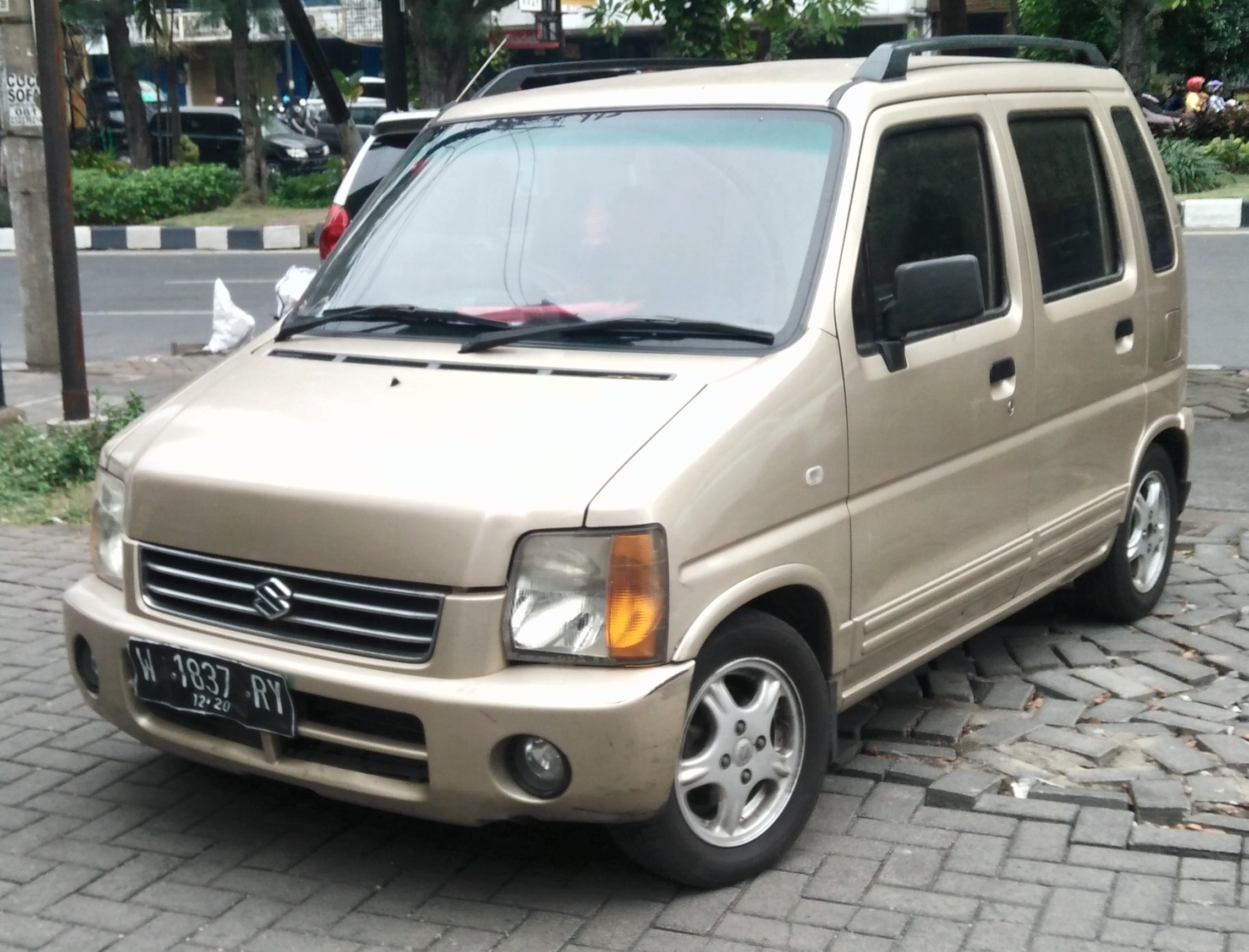
Suzuki Karimun GX (Indonesia)

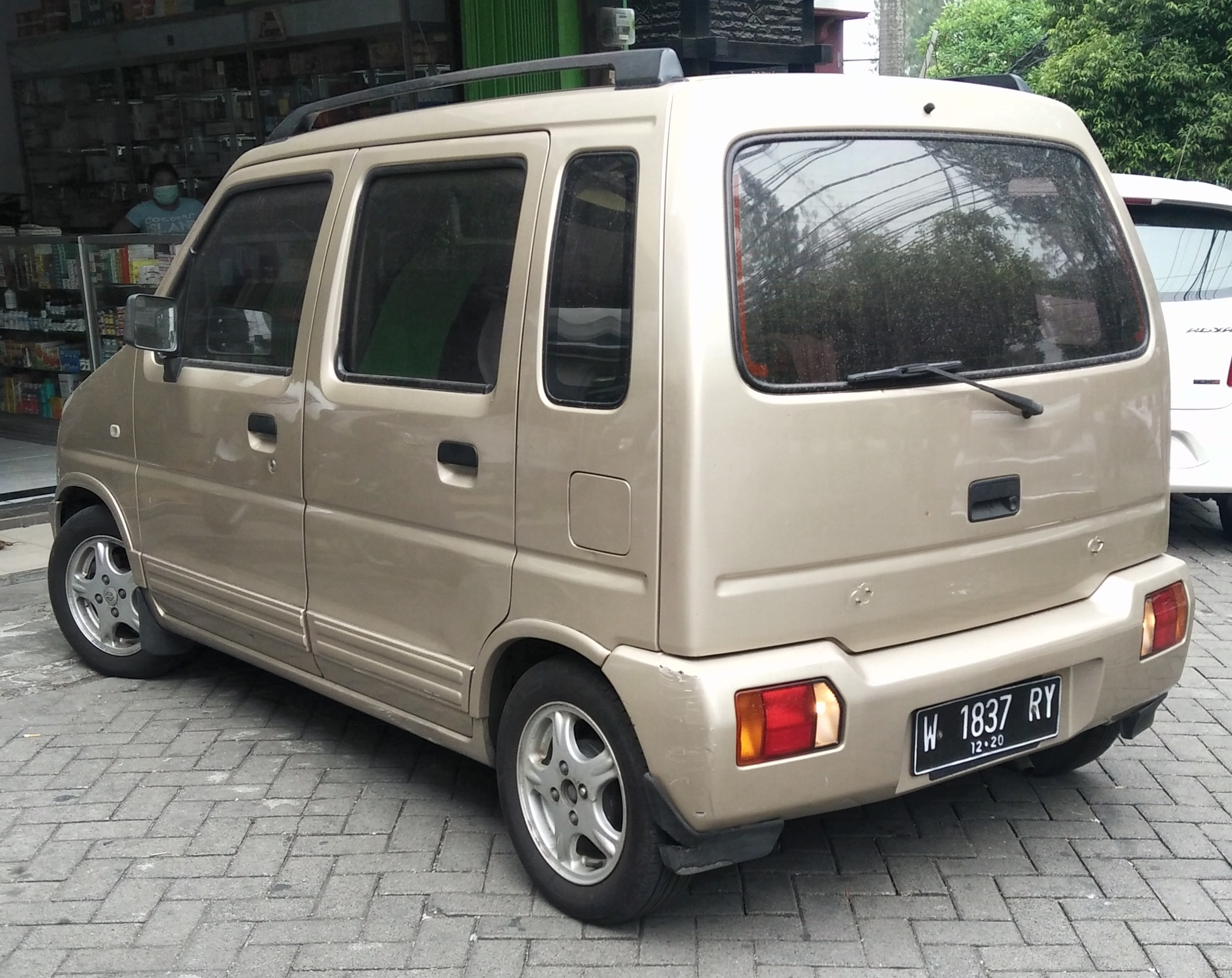
Suzuki Karimun GX (Indonesia)

== First generation (MA63S/64S/32S; 1999) ==
First generation
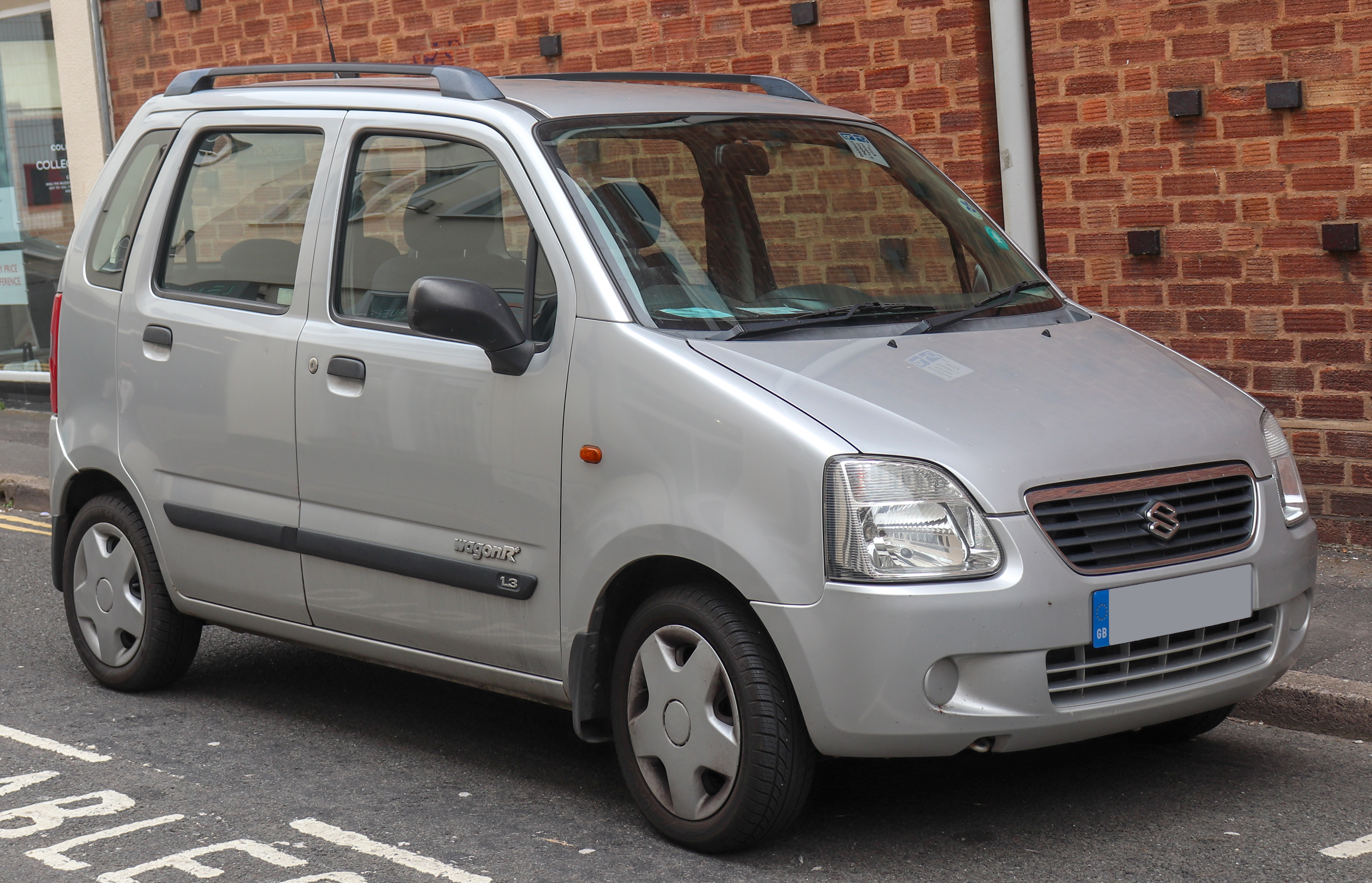
- 2003 Suzuki Wagon R+ GL 1.3 (pre-facelift, UK)

Overview
- Model code: MA63S/MA64S/MA34S
- Also called: Suzuki Wagon R+ (Japan, 1999–2000; Europe, 1999–2008); Suzuki Wagon R Solio (Japan, 2000–2004); Opel/Vauxhall Agila A (Europe, 1999–2007); Chevrolet MW (Japan; 2000–2003, 2006–2010)
- Production: 1999–2010
- Assembly: Japan: Makinohara, Shizuoka (Sagara plant); Hungary: Esztergom (Magyar Suzuki); Poland: Gliwice (Opel Polska); Taiwan: New Taipei City (Prince Motors)

Powertrain
- Engine: Petrol: 996 cc K10A I4; 996 cc K10A turbo I4; 1298 cc G13BB I4; 1328 cc M13A I4; Diesel: 1248 cc D13A turbo I4 (Europe)
- Transmission: 5-speed manual; 4-speed automatic

Dimensions
- Wheelbase: 2,360 mm (92.9 in)
- Length: 3,545 mm (139.6 in)
- Width: 1,620 mm (63.8 in)
- Height: 1,665–1,705 mm (65.6–67.1 in)
- Curb weight: 970 kg (2,138 lb)

Chronology
- Successor: Suzuki Splash (outside Japan)

The Wagon R+ was launched in May 1999 in Japan, replacing the Wagon R-Wide. This updated version started sales in the European market in the summer of 2000. The main difference between the JDM Wagon R+ and the European Wagon R+ is the door handles, which on JDM models were body-coloured while European models received black door handles.

In December 2000, the Japanese-spec model was renamed Wagon R Solio, and this was available both in the bottom-of-the-line X trim level and in a more sports-oriented trim level known as the 1.3. In June 2002, the 1.0 E trim level was added to the Wagon R-Solio lineup. In August 2003, a mid-facelift Wagon R-Solio was released. In April 2004, the Wagon R-Solio was renamed Solio, losing the Wagon R moniker entirely. In August 2005, a facelifted Solio was launched.

The Hungarian-built Wagon R+ was produced for the European market for years after the Japanese models were phased out, albeit with limited range and availability. As of 2006 in the UK, only one model was available – the GL, with a 1.3 litre (1298 cc) 16 valve 4-cylinder petrol engine delivering 59 kW (80 PS; 79 hp), ABS with EBD and air conditioning as options. The latest model was 3,540 mm (139.4 in) x 1,620 mm (63.8 in) x 1,695 mm (66.7 in) (length x width x height), with a claimed 597 litres (21.1 cu ft) of cargo space. It was too difficult for either the Wagon R-Solio or Solio to meet with Euro NCAP crash safety ratings, resulting in the Wagon R+ being replaced by the Splash in late 2008.

From 2000 until 2007, the Wagon R+ was rebadged as Opel/Vauxhall Agila. The Agila was built at an Opel factory in Gliwice, Poland and used Opel Engines and transmissions.

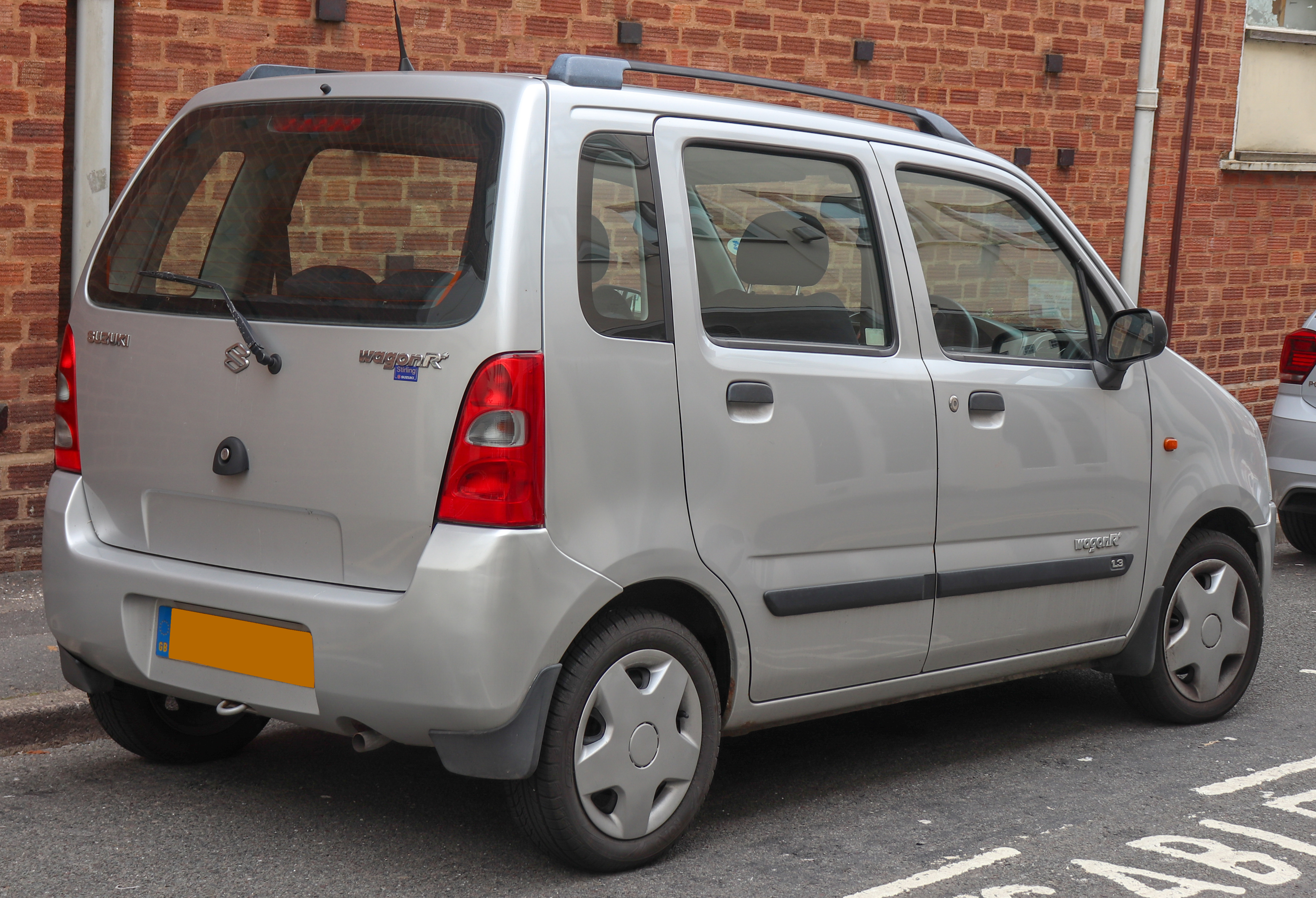
2003 Suzuki Wagon R+ GL 1.3 (pre-facelift, UK)

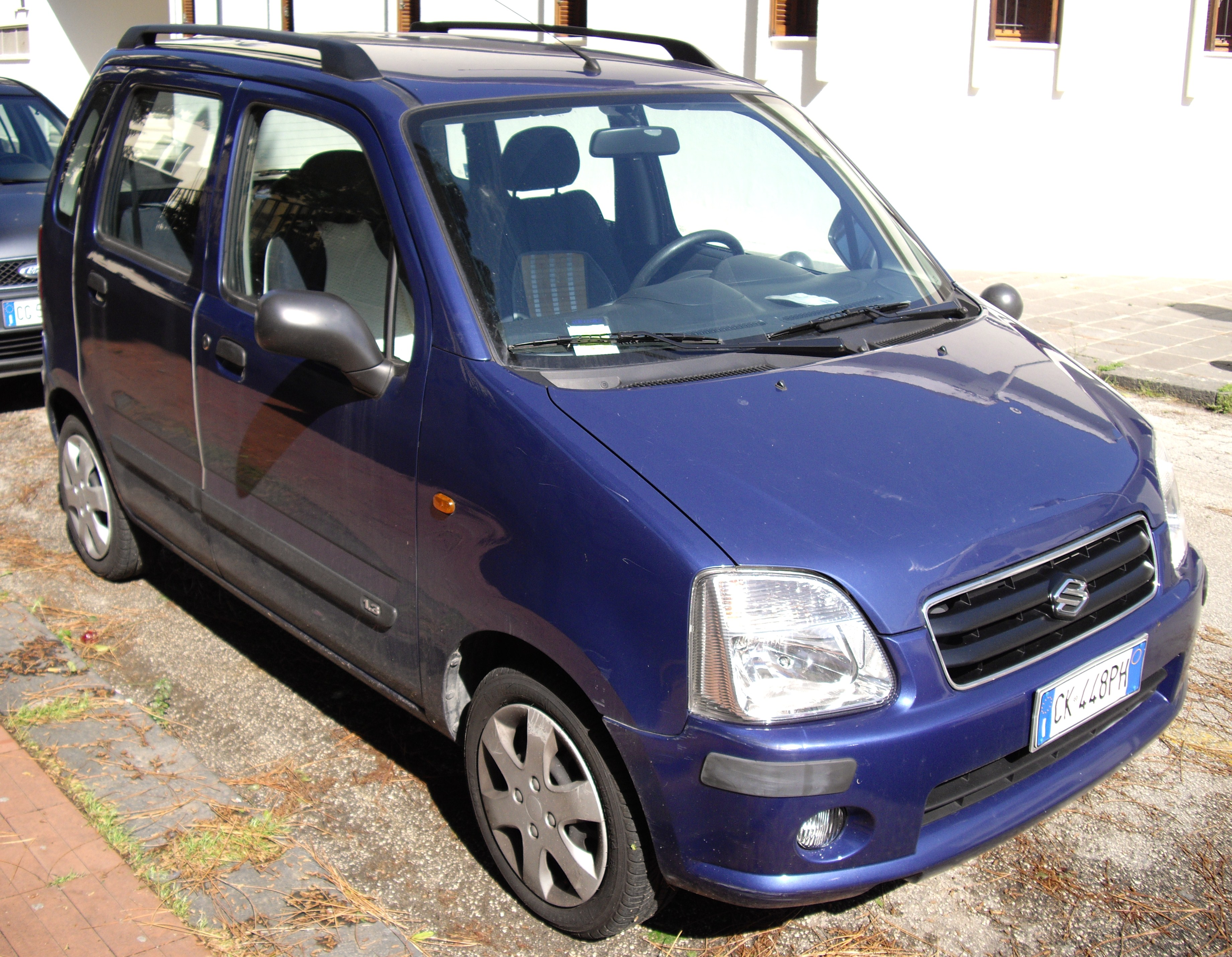
Suzuki Wagon R+ DDiS 1.3 (facelift, Italy)

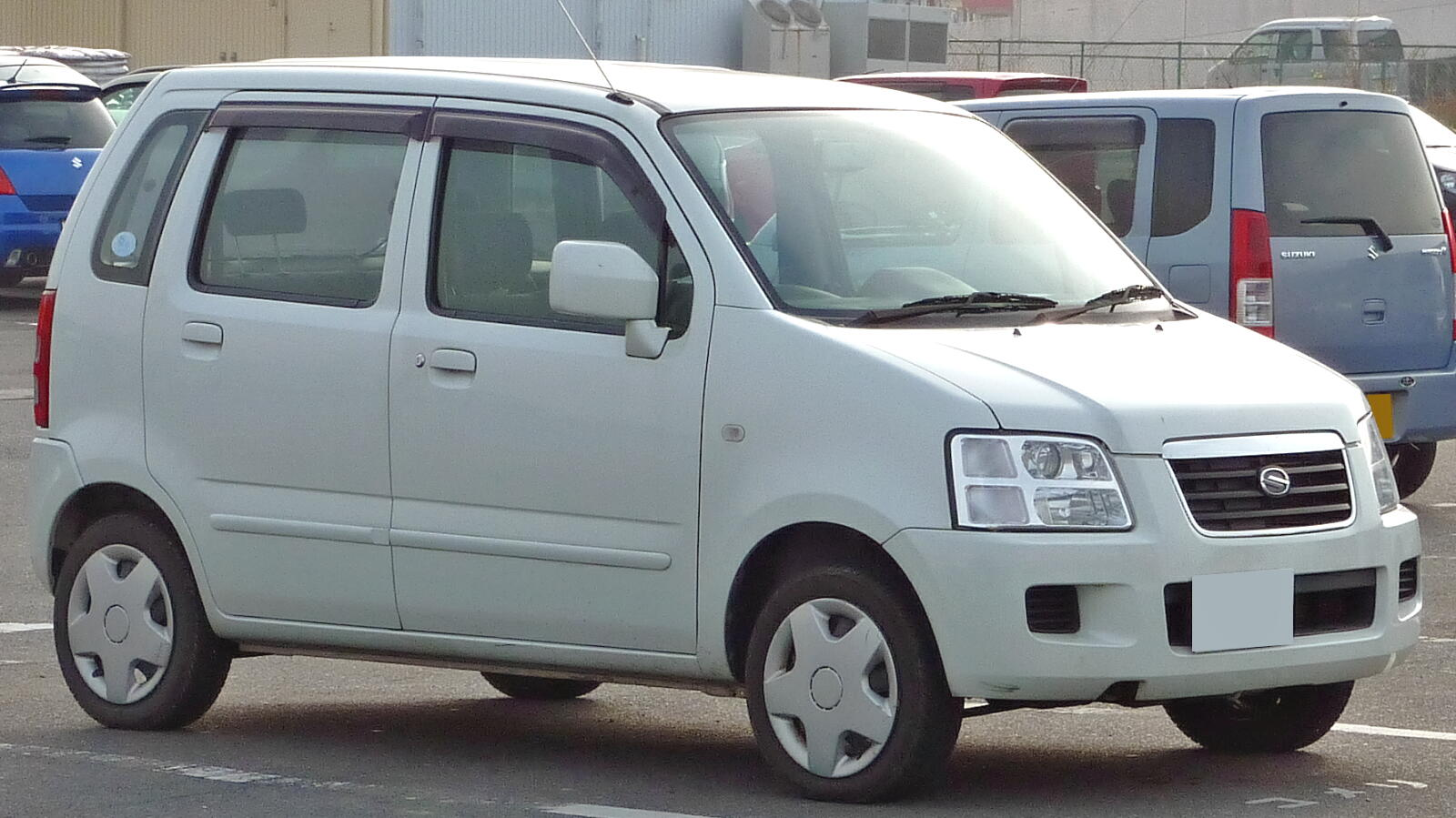
2002–2005 Suzuki Wagon R Solio (first facelift, Japan)

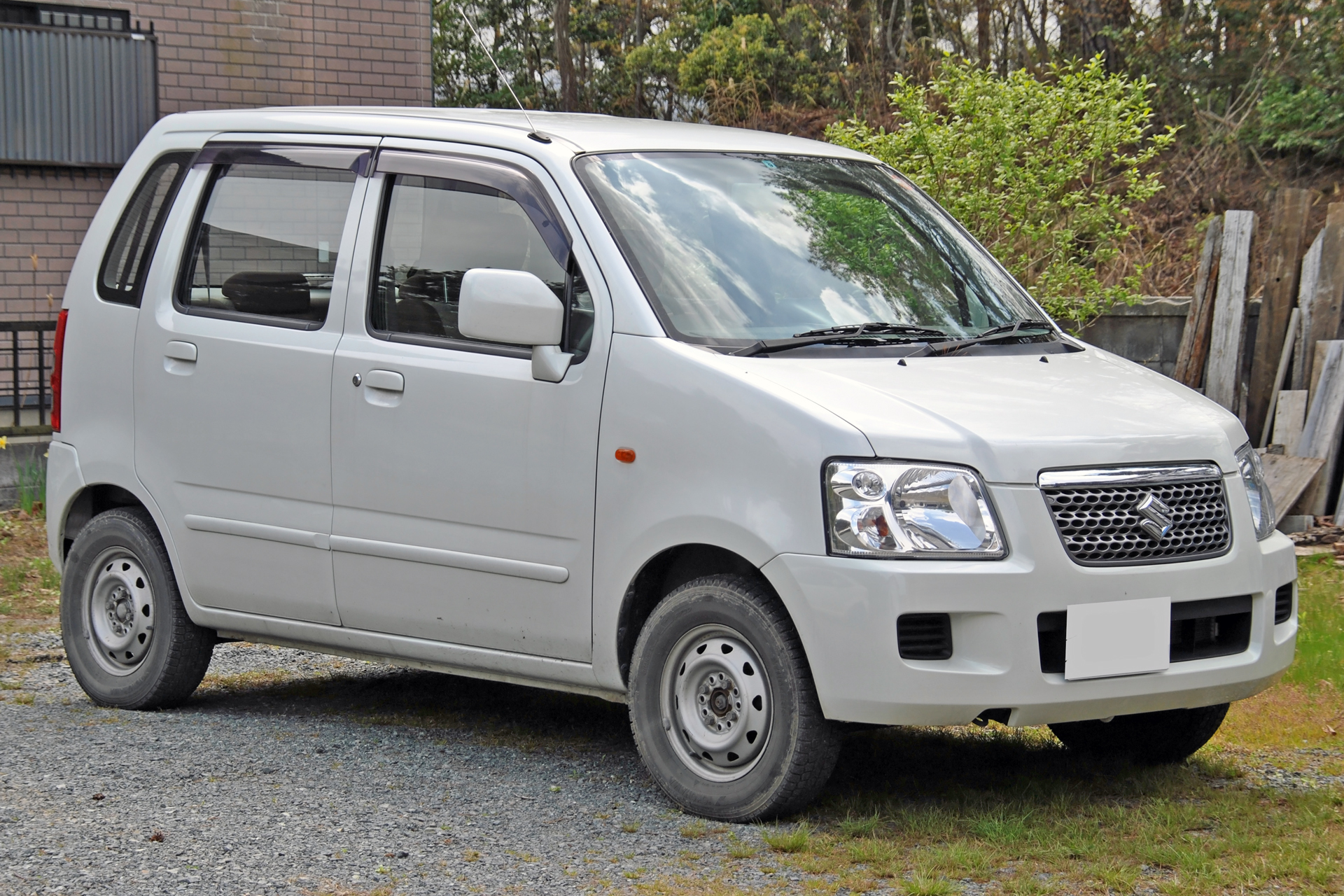
2005–2010 Suzuki Solio (second facelift, Japan)

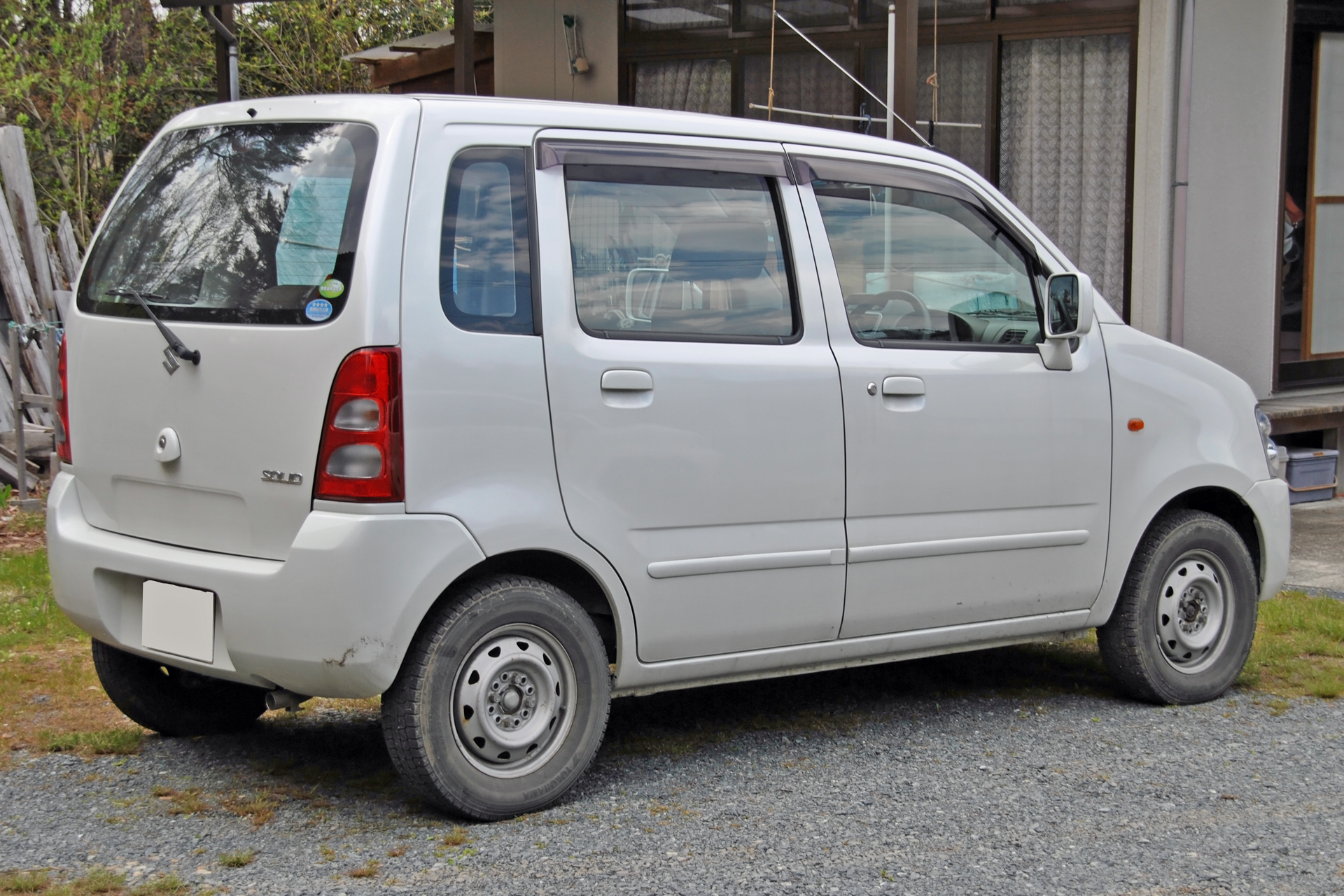
2005–2010 Suzuki Solio (second facelift, Japan)

=== Chevrolet MW ===
An OEM rebadged version of the Solio under the Chevrolet called the MW (Medium Wagon) sold from September 2000. The base models were the Suzuki Wagon R Plus and Wagon R Solio (facelift), which was a joint venture between General Motors and Suzuki.

The exterior was very differentiated from Solio. Features aero bumpers, side spoilers, a large front grille, and a roof-end spoiler. Initially available by a 996 cc K10A and 1328 cc M13A engine option, but the 1.0-litre was discontinued in 2002. Production was ceased in 2003, and production was resumed in January 2006. The Chevrolet MW was sold by Chevrolet itself and Suzuki Arena retail sales channels.

Production was ceased in August 2010, following the dissolution of the joint venture between GM and Suzuki in 2008.

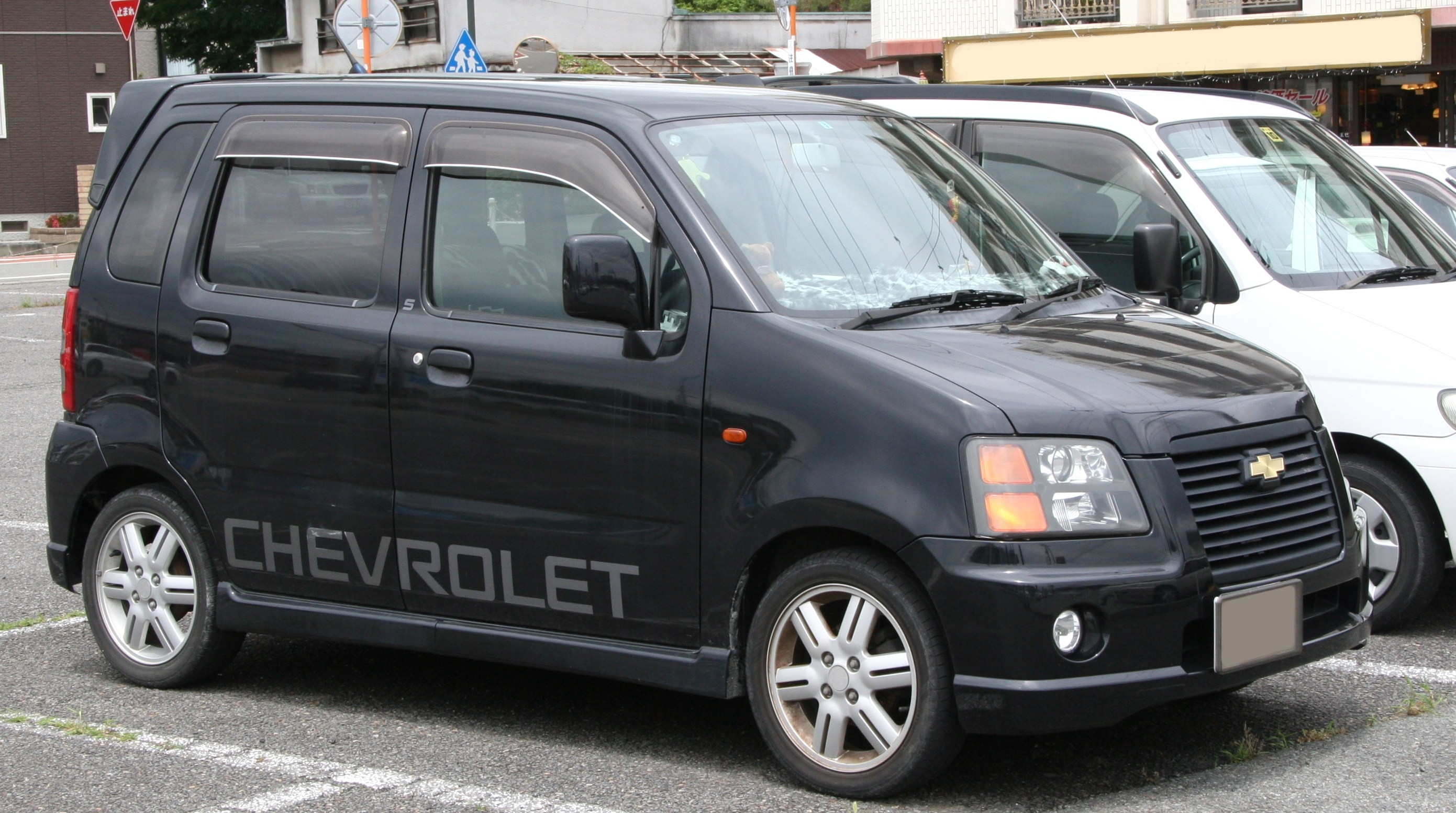
Chevrolet MW (pre-facelift, Japan)

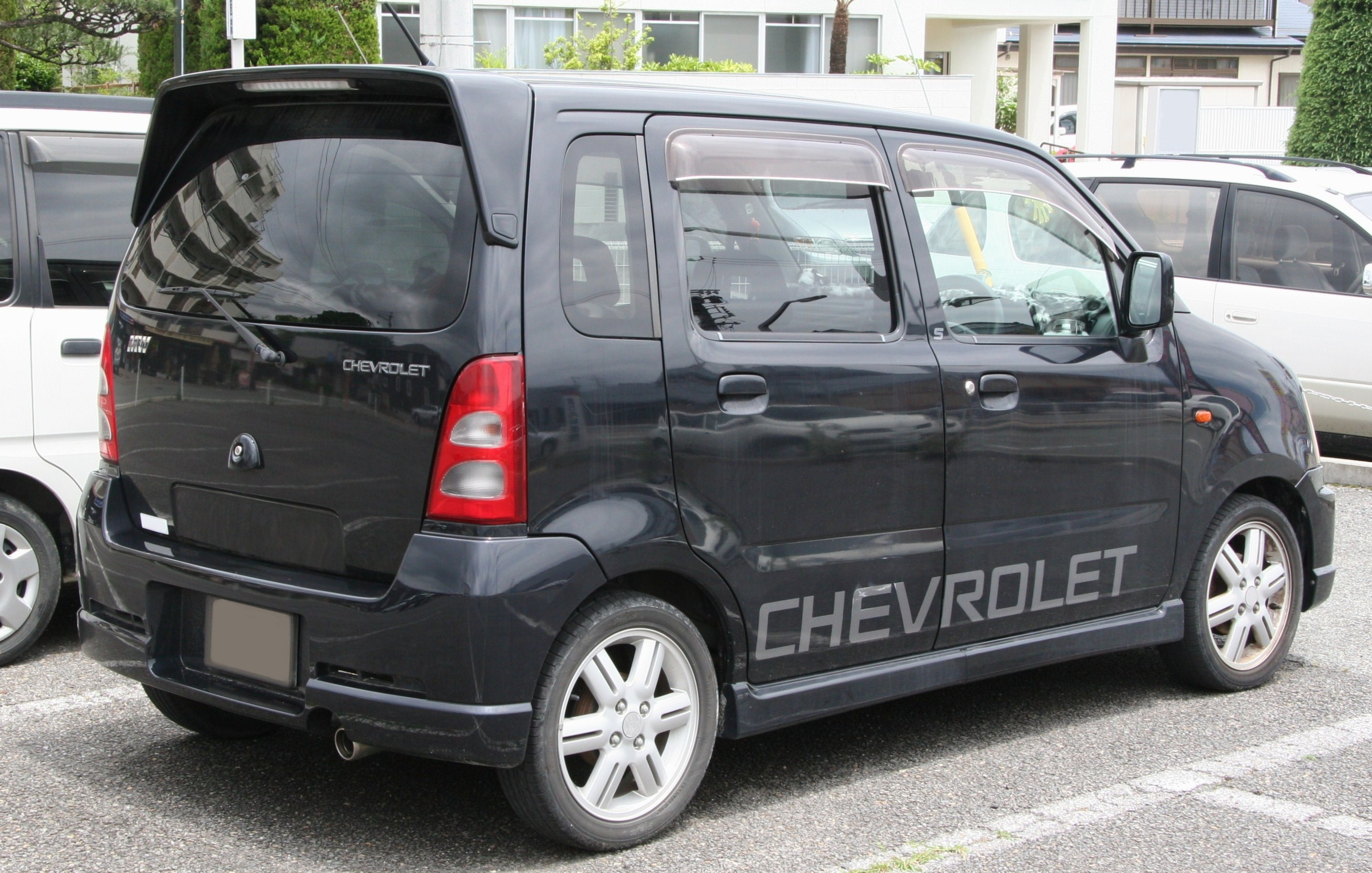
Chevrolet MW (pre-facelift, Japan)

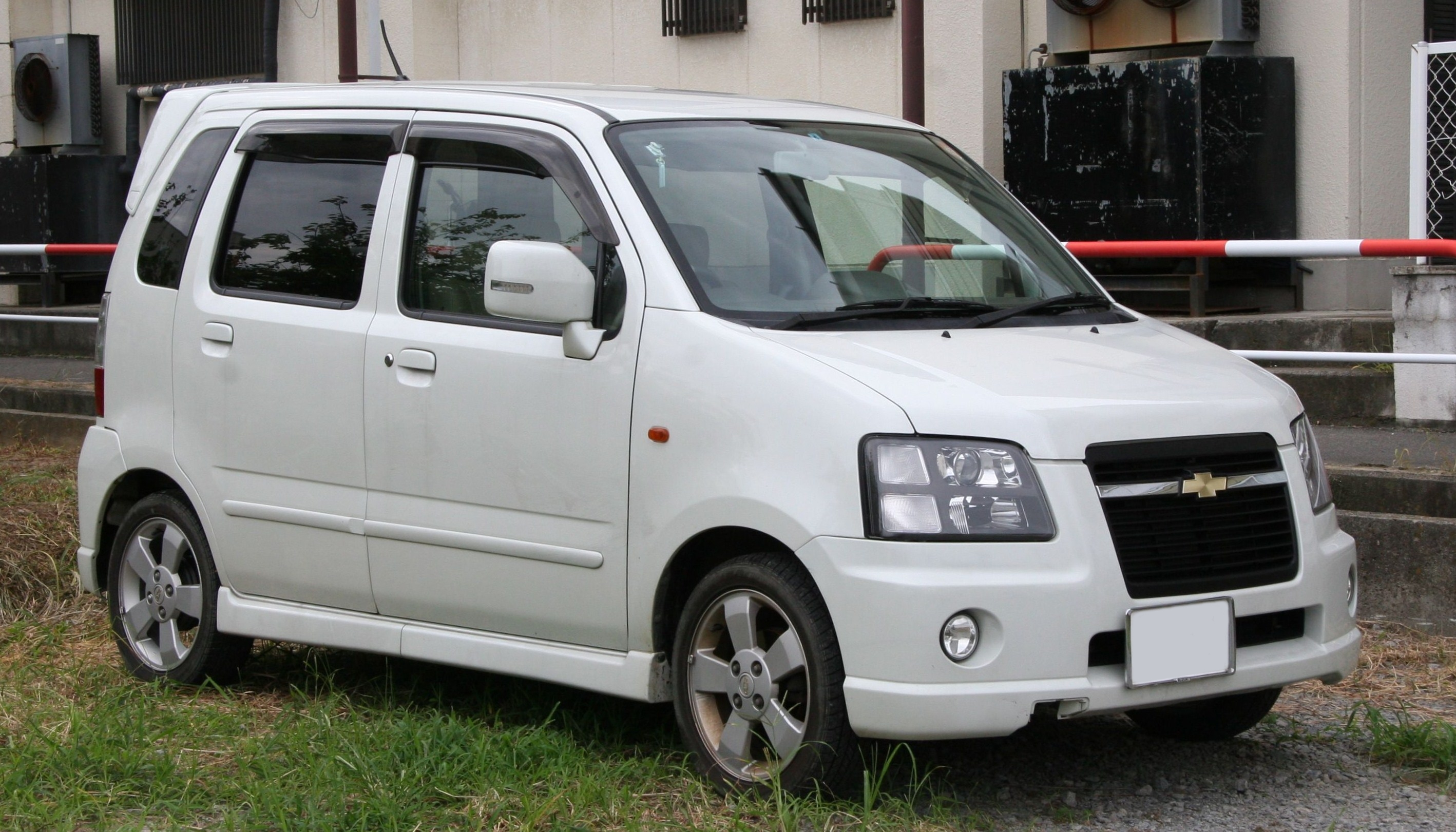
Chevrolet MW (facelift, Japan)

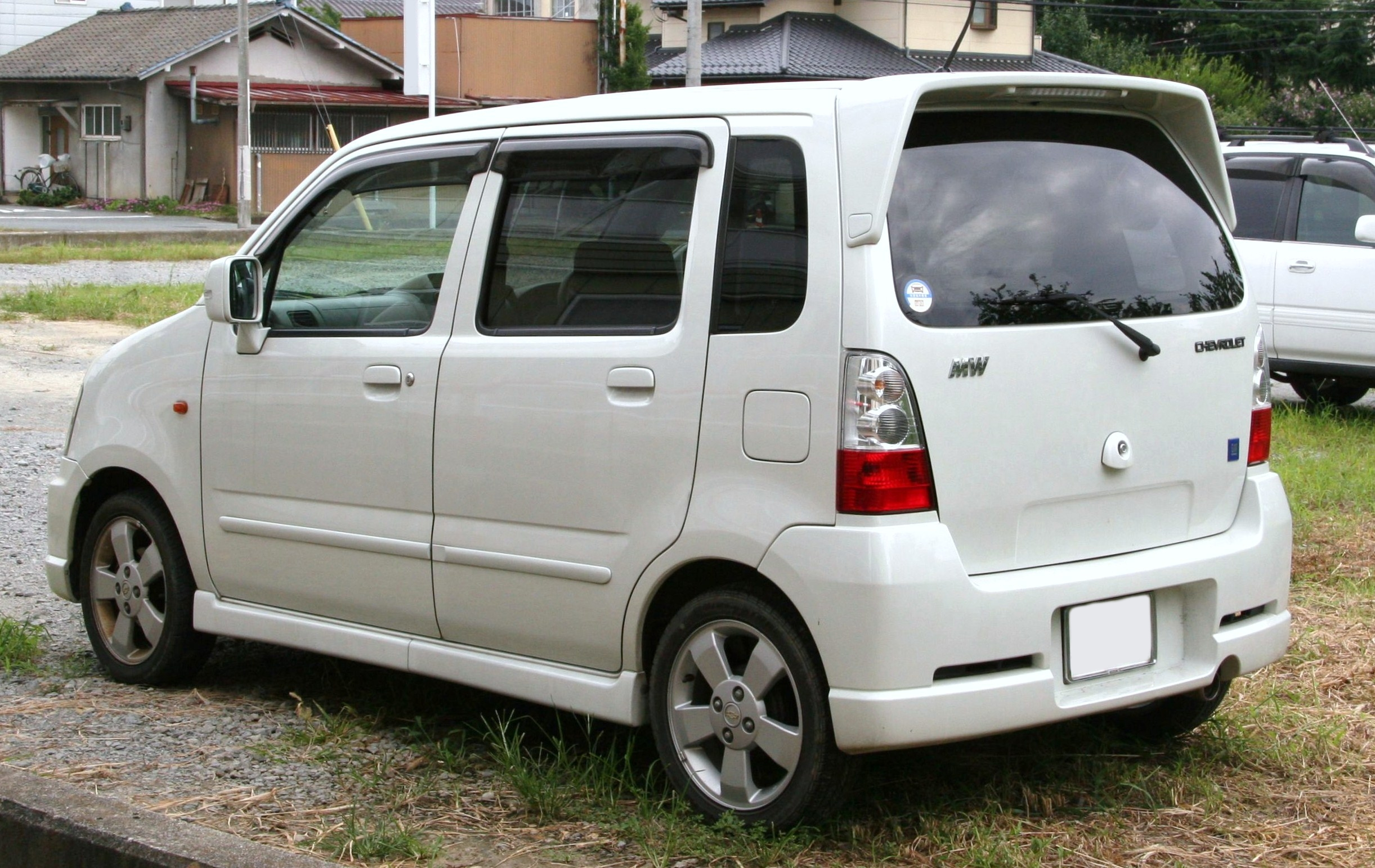
Chevrolet MW (facelift, Japan)

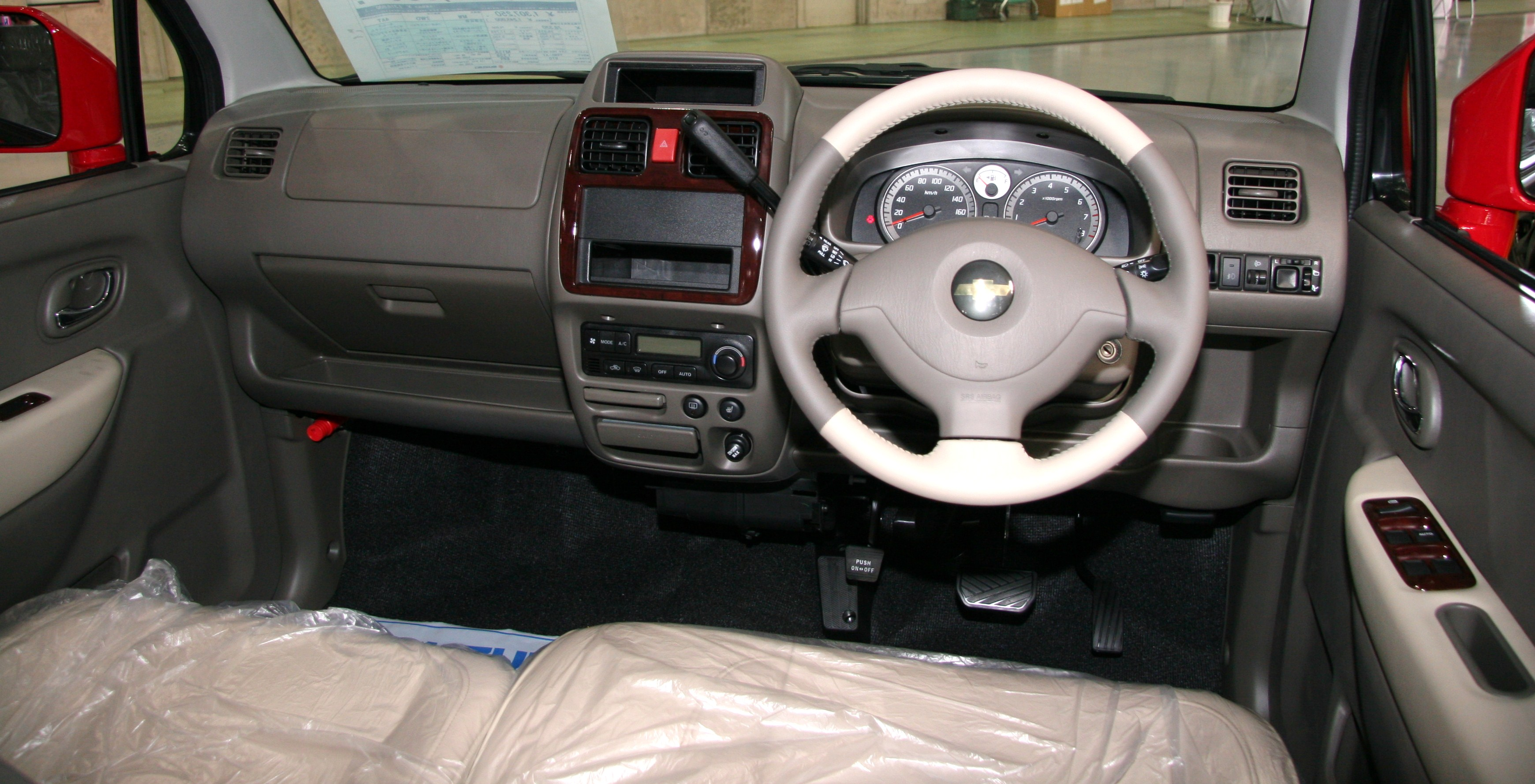
Chevrolet MW interior

== Second generation (MA15S; 2011) ==
Second generation
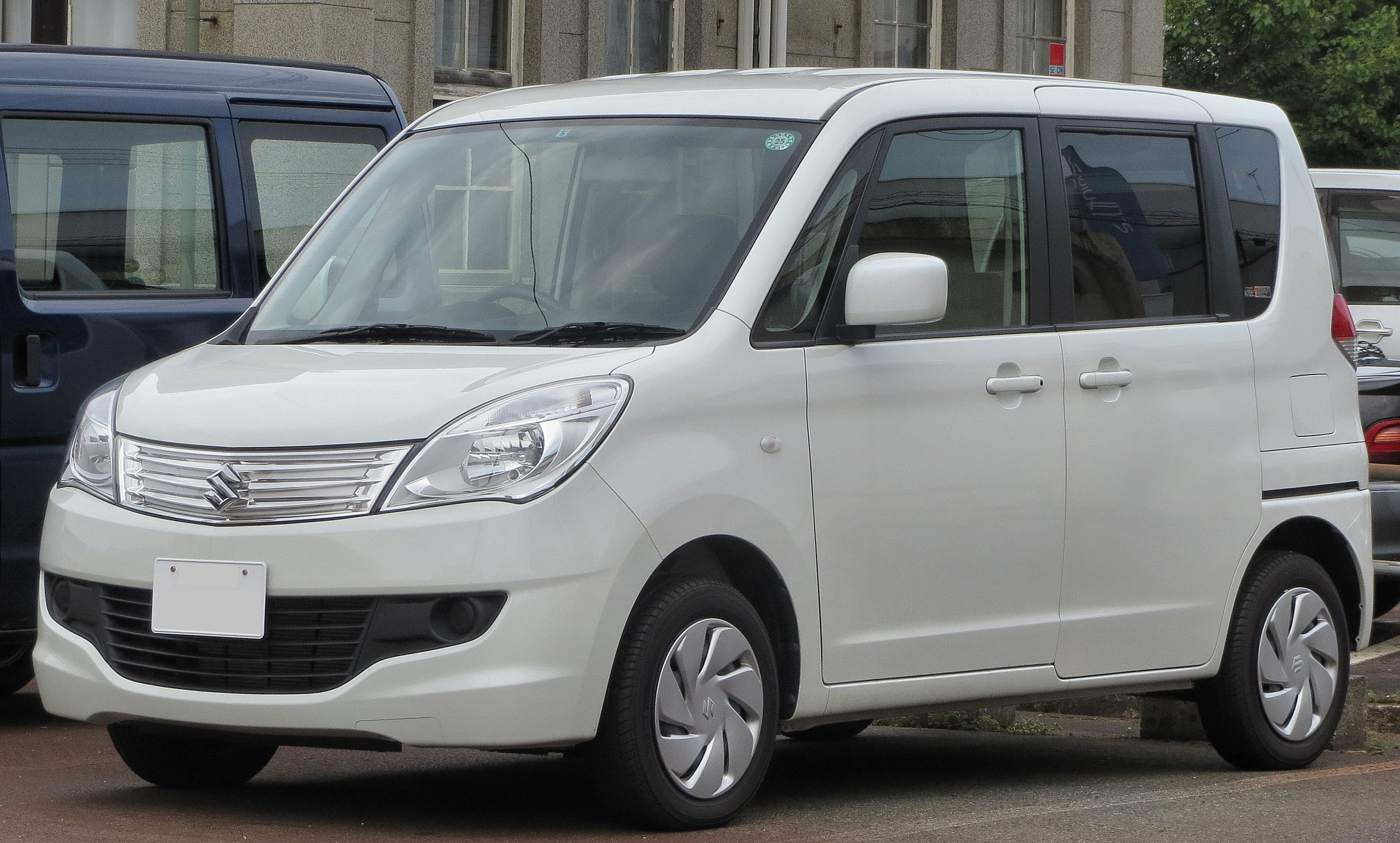
- 2011–2013 Suzuki Solio G

Overview
- Model code: MA15S
- Also called: Mitsubishi Delica D:2
- Production: January 2011– August 2015
- Assembly: Japan: Makinohara, Shizuoka (Sagara plant)

Powertrain
- Engine: 1242 cc K12B DOHC VVT I4
- Transmission: CVT

Dimensions
- Wheelbase: 2,450 mm (96.5 in)
- Length: 3,710 mm (146.1 in)
- Width: 1,620 mm (63.8 in)
- Height: 1,765 mm (69.5 in)
- Curb weight: 1,000–1,090 kg (2,205–2,403 lb)

While the kei-version of the Wagon R went through third and fourth generations, the wider Solio remained in its first-generation until undergoing a full model change in December 2010. The second-generation Solio was released on 7 January 2011 and is based on the Palette instead of the Wagon R, although the Palette itself uses the Wagon R's platform.

In June 2012, the deritative model called the Solio Bandit was added. Features a slightly redesigned front fascia, LED headlights, spoiler, and chrome is applied to the reflectors of the taillights. Both front-wheel drive and four wheel drive drivetrains were available.

This generation of Solio (MA15) also provides the basis for an OEM deal with Mitsubishi Motors, who marketed a rebadged version as the Mitsubishi Delica D:2, which was released in March 2011. In Japan, it was sold at a specific retail chain called Car Plaza.

The facelift model was released in November 2013.

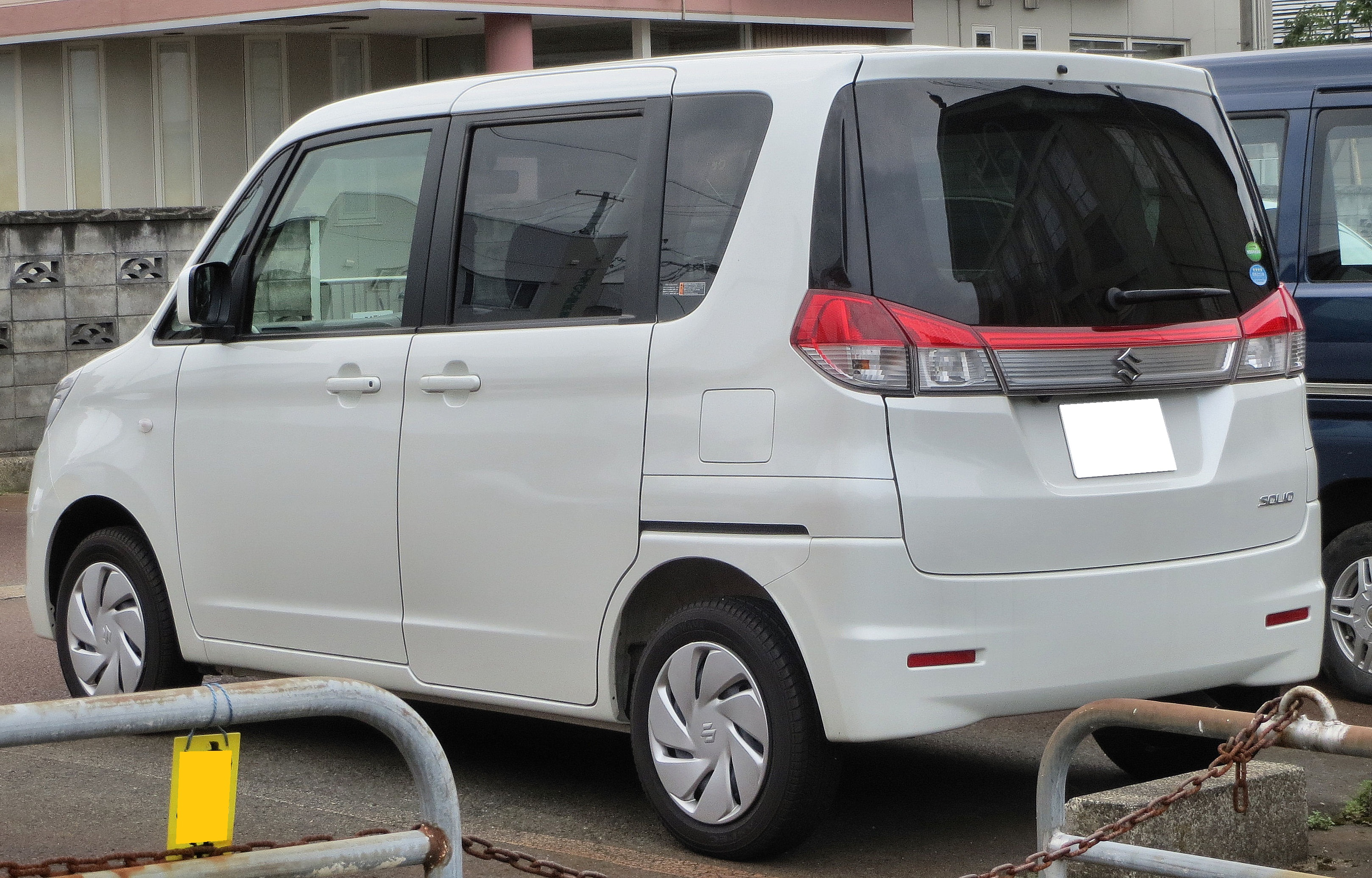
2011–2013 Suzuki Solio G

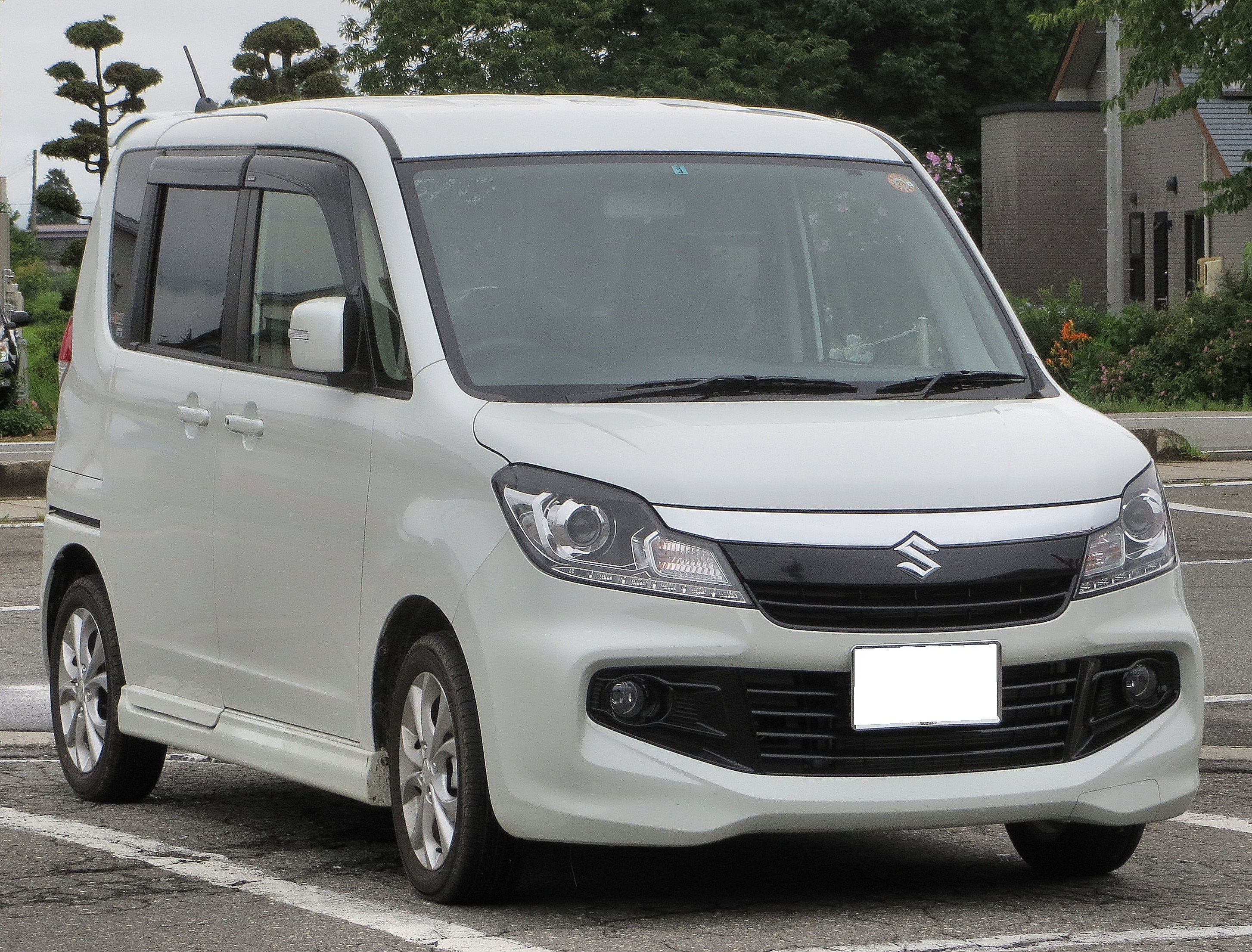
2012–2015 Suzuki Solio Bandit

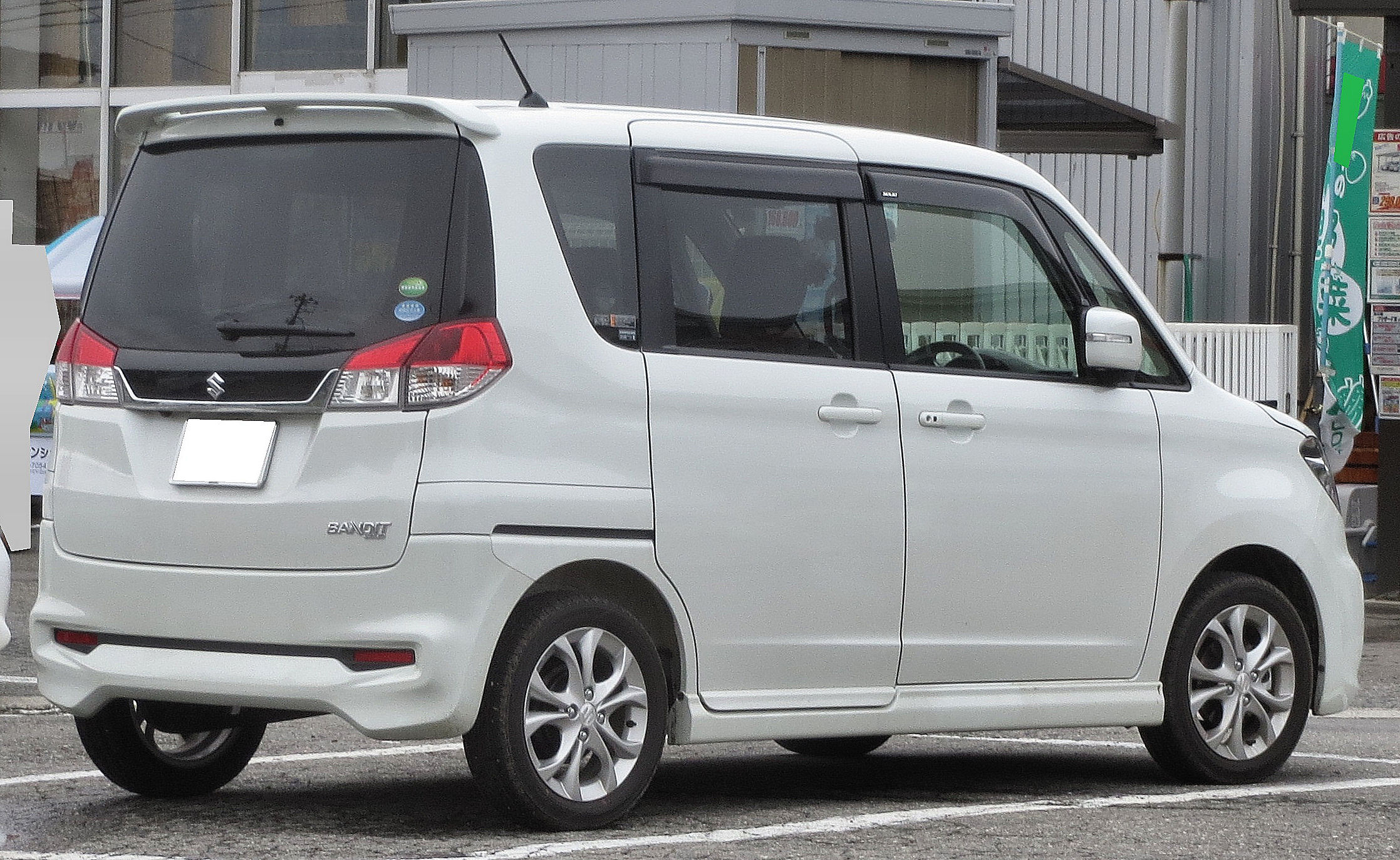
2012–2015 Suzuki Solio Bandit

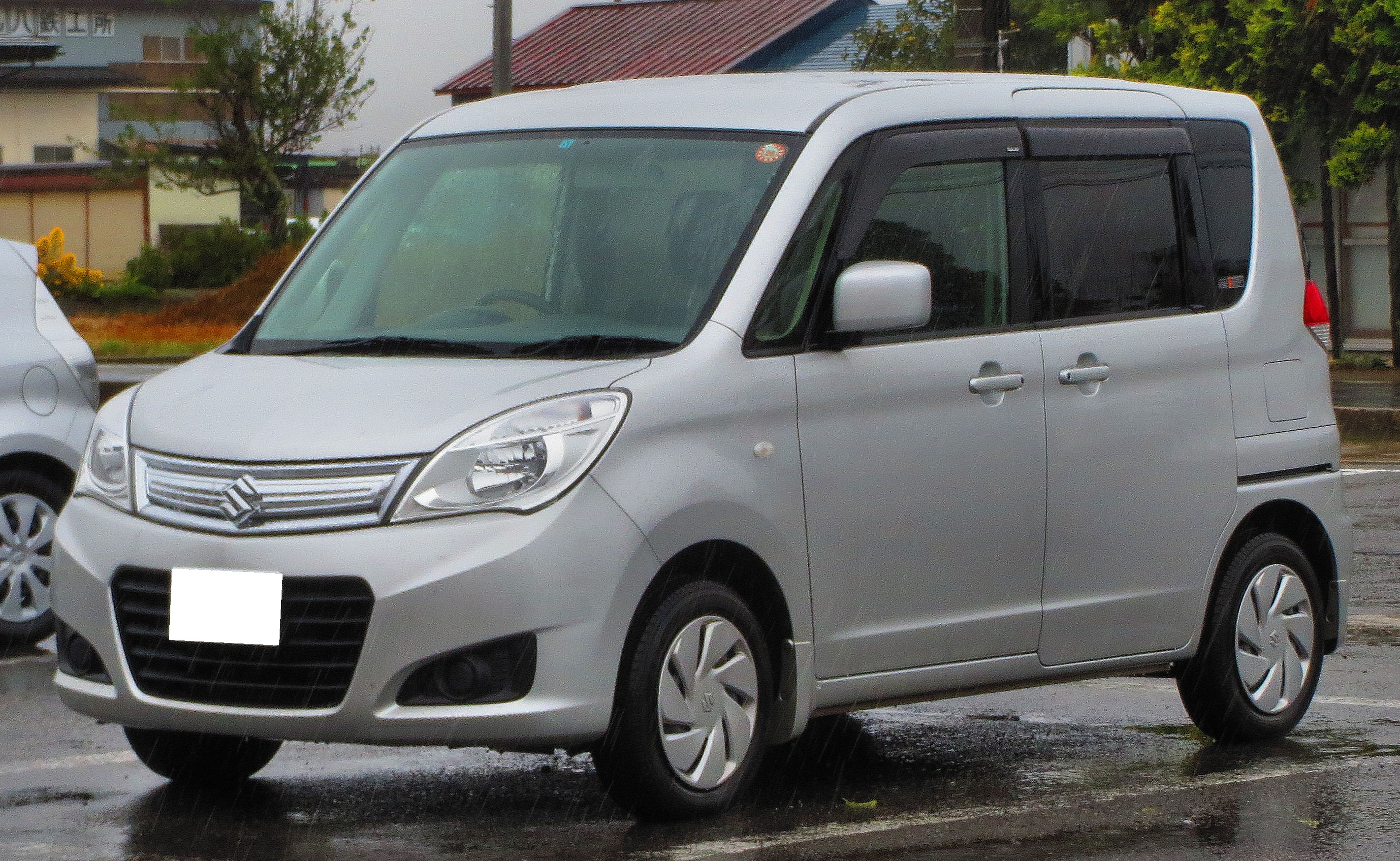
2013–2015 Suzuki Solio G

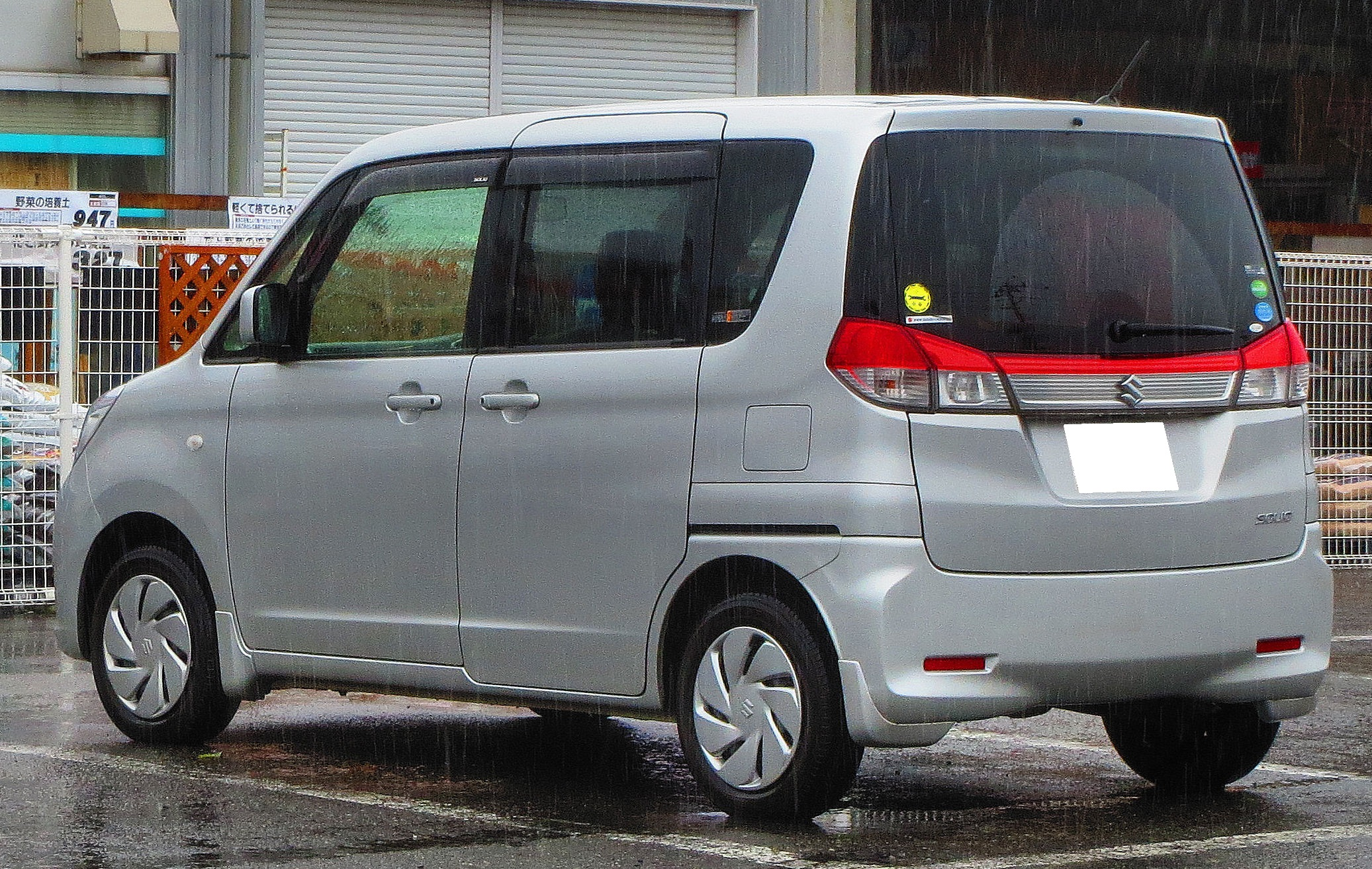
2013–2015 Suzuki Solio G

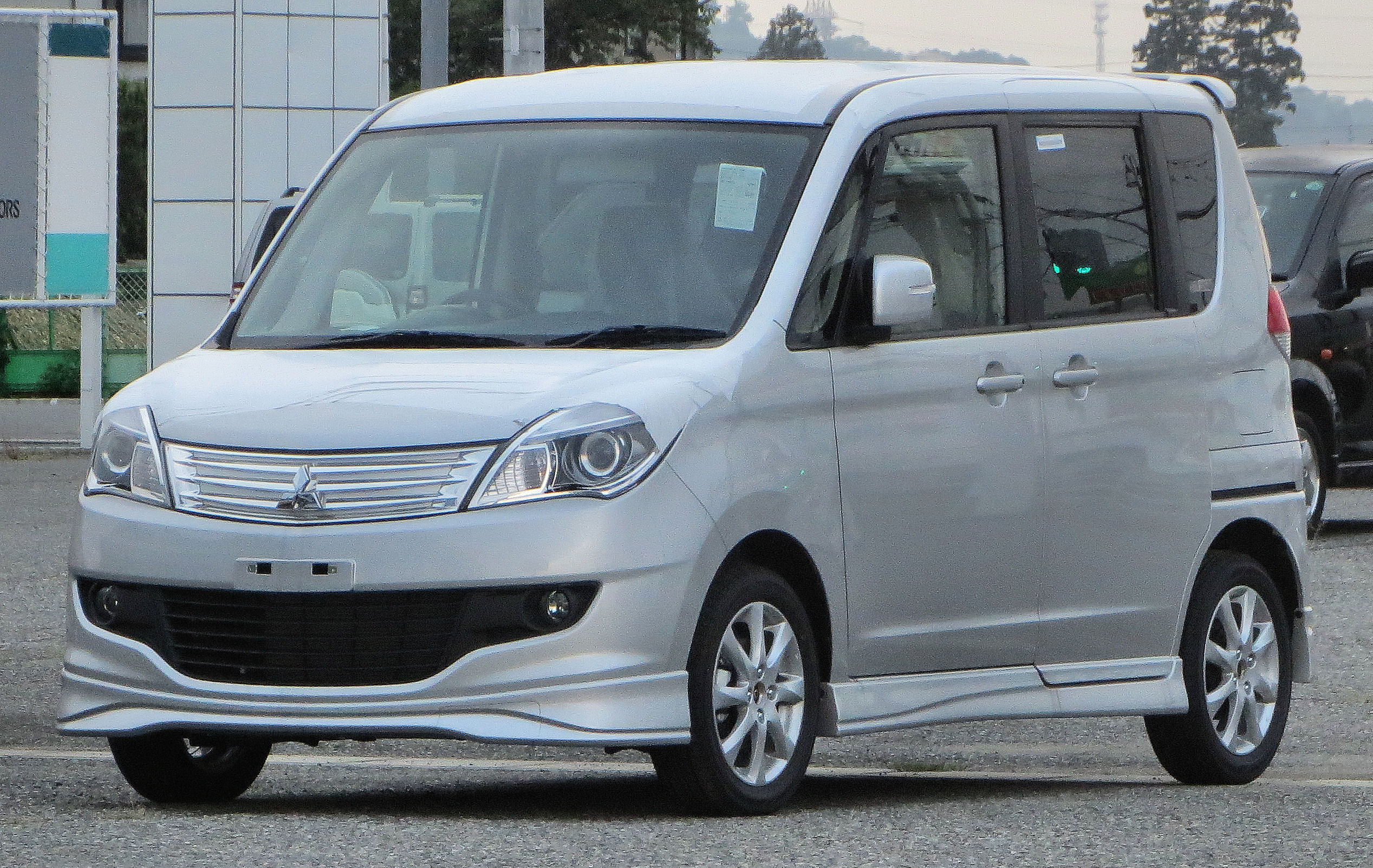
2011–2013 Mitsubishi Delica D:2 S

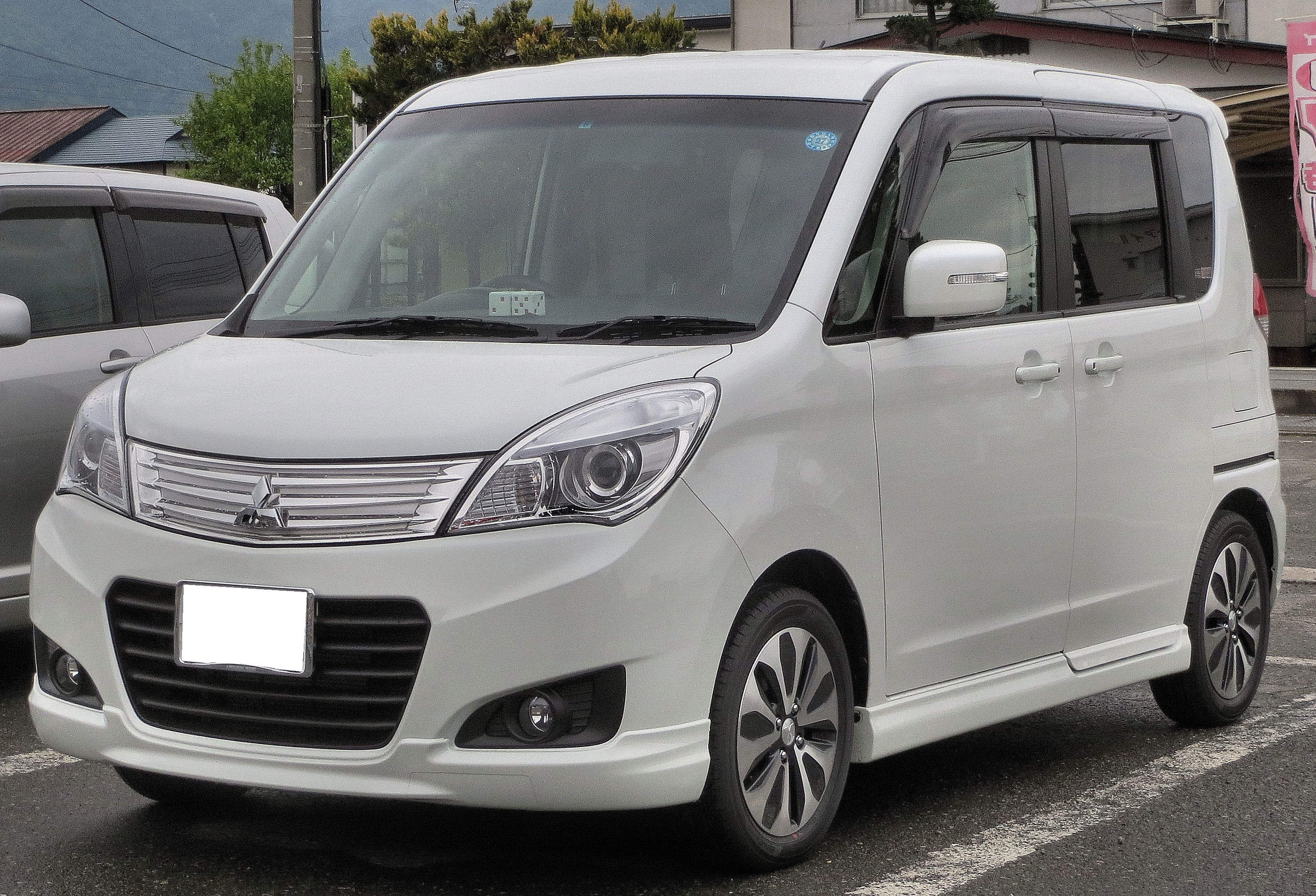
2013–2015 Mitsubishi Delica D:2 S

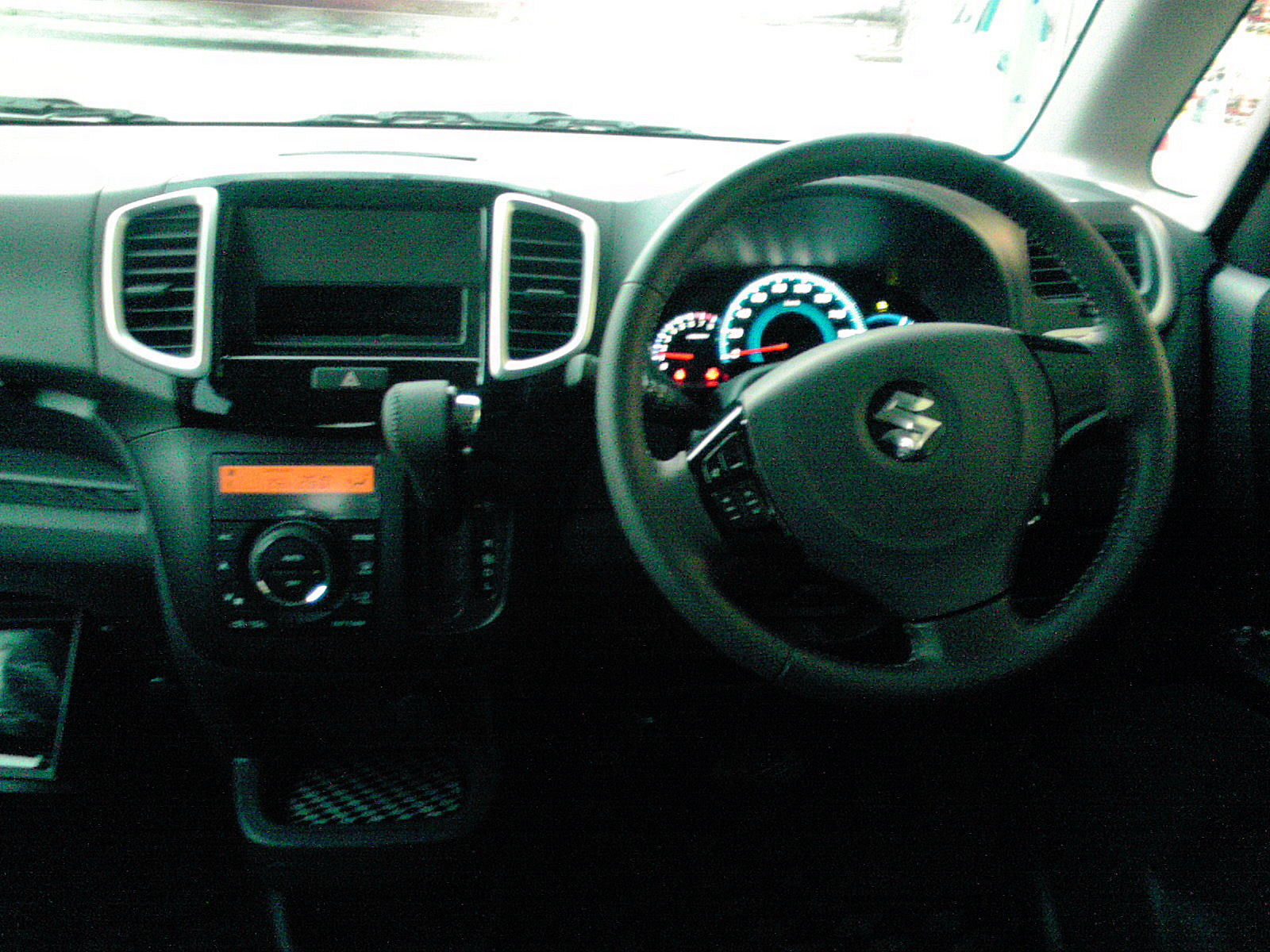
Interior

== Third generation (MA26S/MA36S/MA46S; 2015) ==
Third generation
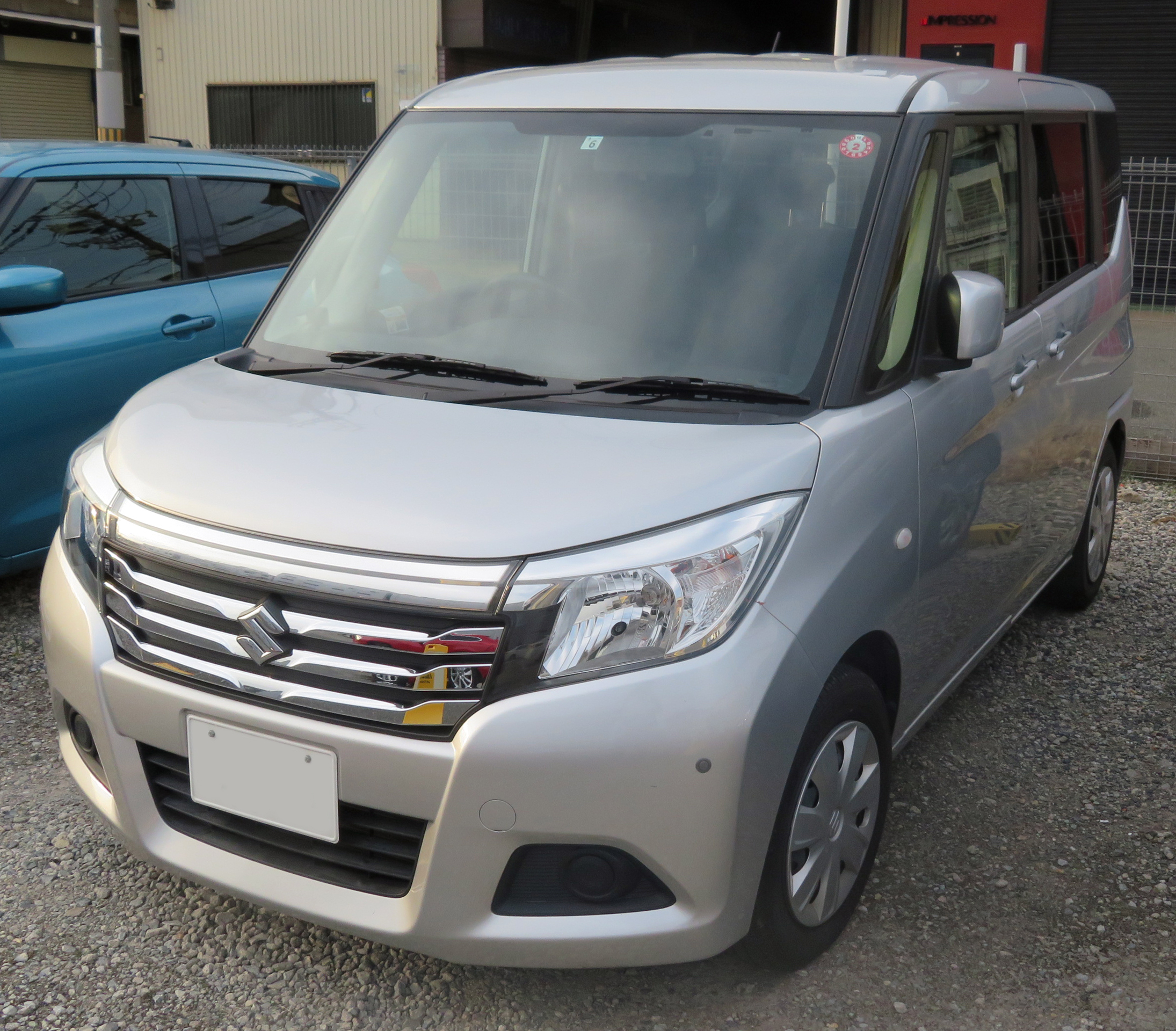
- Suzuki Solio G

Overview
- Model code: MA26S/MA36S/MA46S
- Also called: Mitsubishi Delica D:2
- Production: August 2015–November 2020
- Assembly: Japan: Makinohara, Shizuoka (Sagara plant)

Body and chassis
- Platform: HEARTECT platform

Powertrain
- Engine: 1242 cc K12C DOHC VVT Dualjet I4
- Electric motor: WA05A (MHEV); PB05A (HEV)
- Transmission: CVT

Dimensions
- Wheelbase: 2,480 mm (97.6 in)
- Length: 3,710–3,720 mm (146.1–146.5 in)
- Width: 1,625 mm (64.0 in)
- Height: 1,745 mm (68.7 in)
- Curb weight: 930–990 kg (2,050–2,183 lb)

The third-generation Solio was released in Japan on 26 August 2015. The Solio features a chrome front grille, and LED headlights. The interior features charcoal gray seat upholstery, and the mild hybrid model has silver trim on the center garnish. The engine has been replaced with the K12C, which previously used in the second and third generations.

A rebadged version as the Mitsubishi Delica D:2, was released in December 2015.

The facelift model was released in July 2018.

Solio

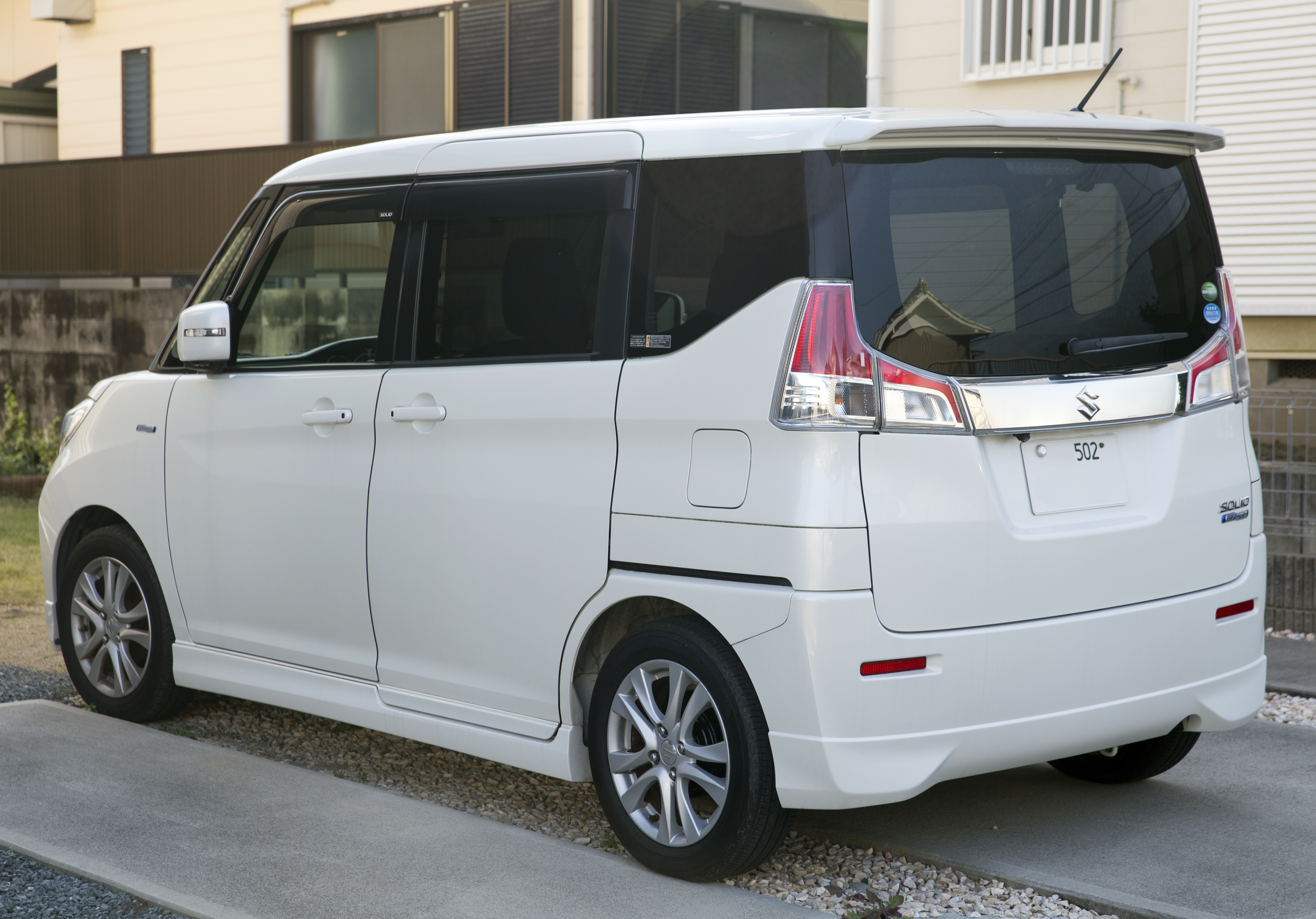
Suzuki Solio Hybrid

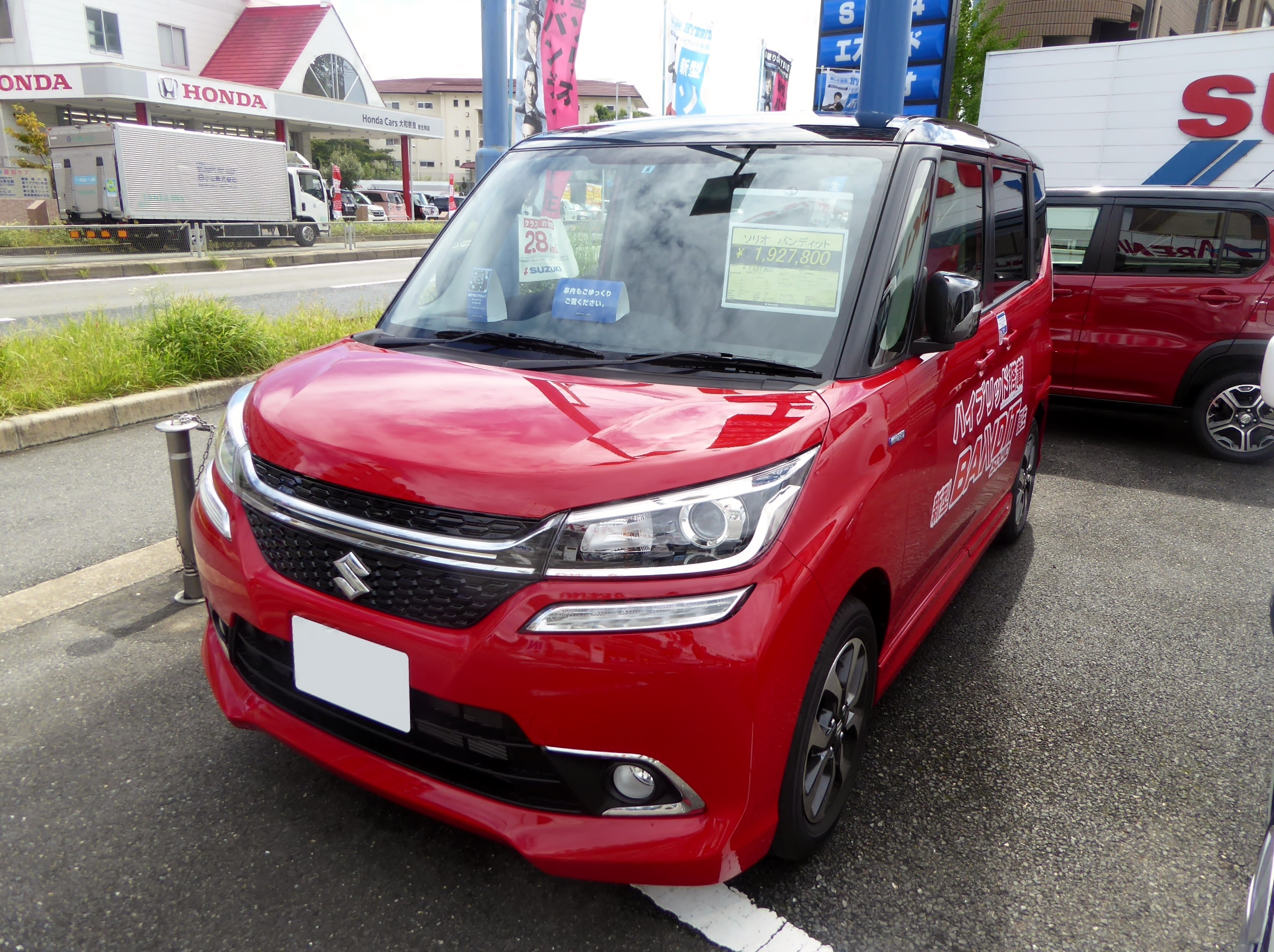
Suzuki Solio Bandit Hybrid MV

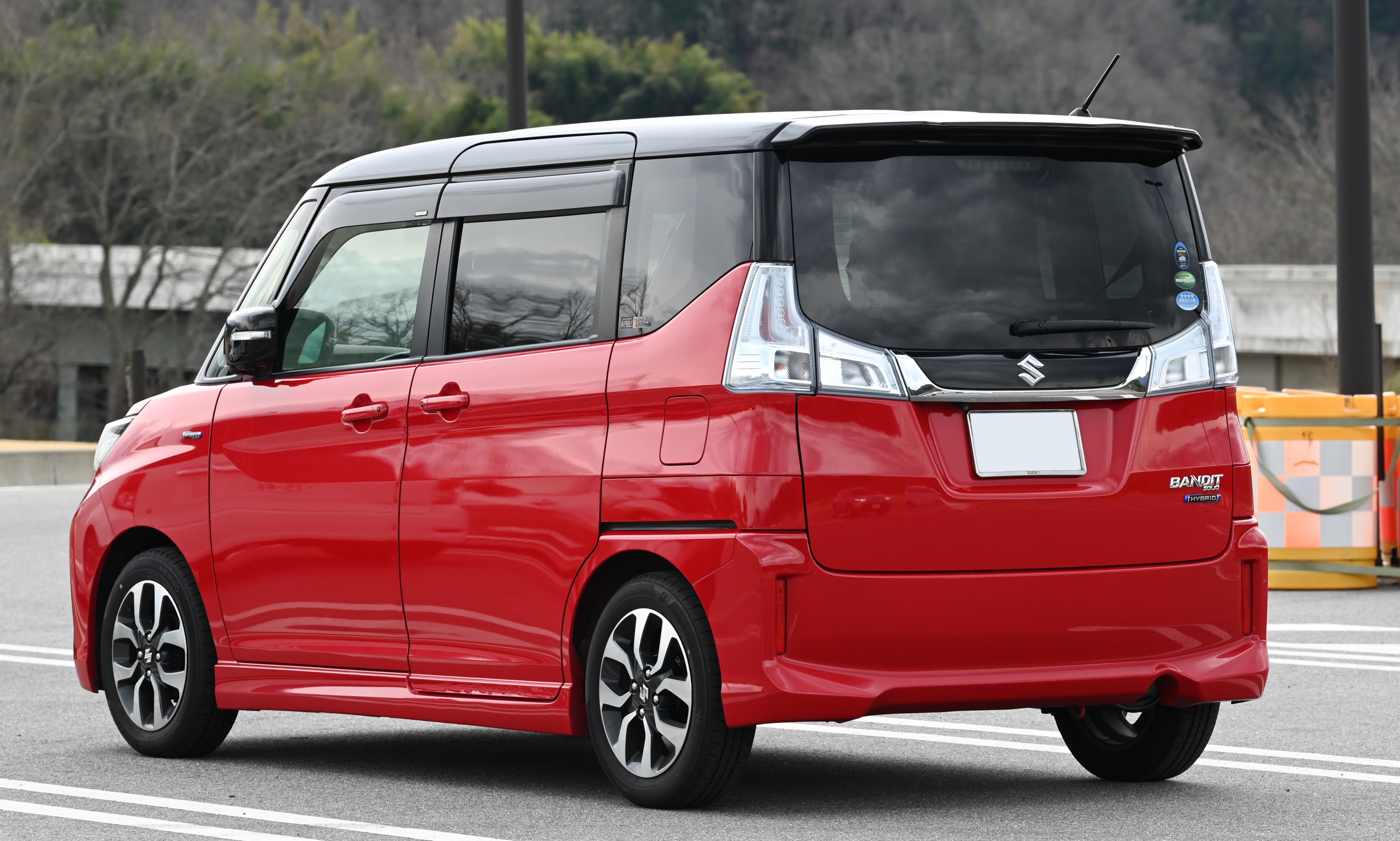
Suzuki Solio Bandit Hybrid SV

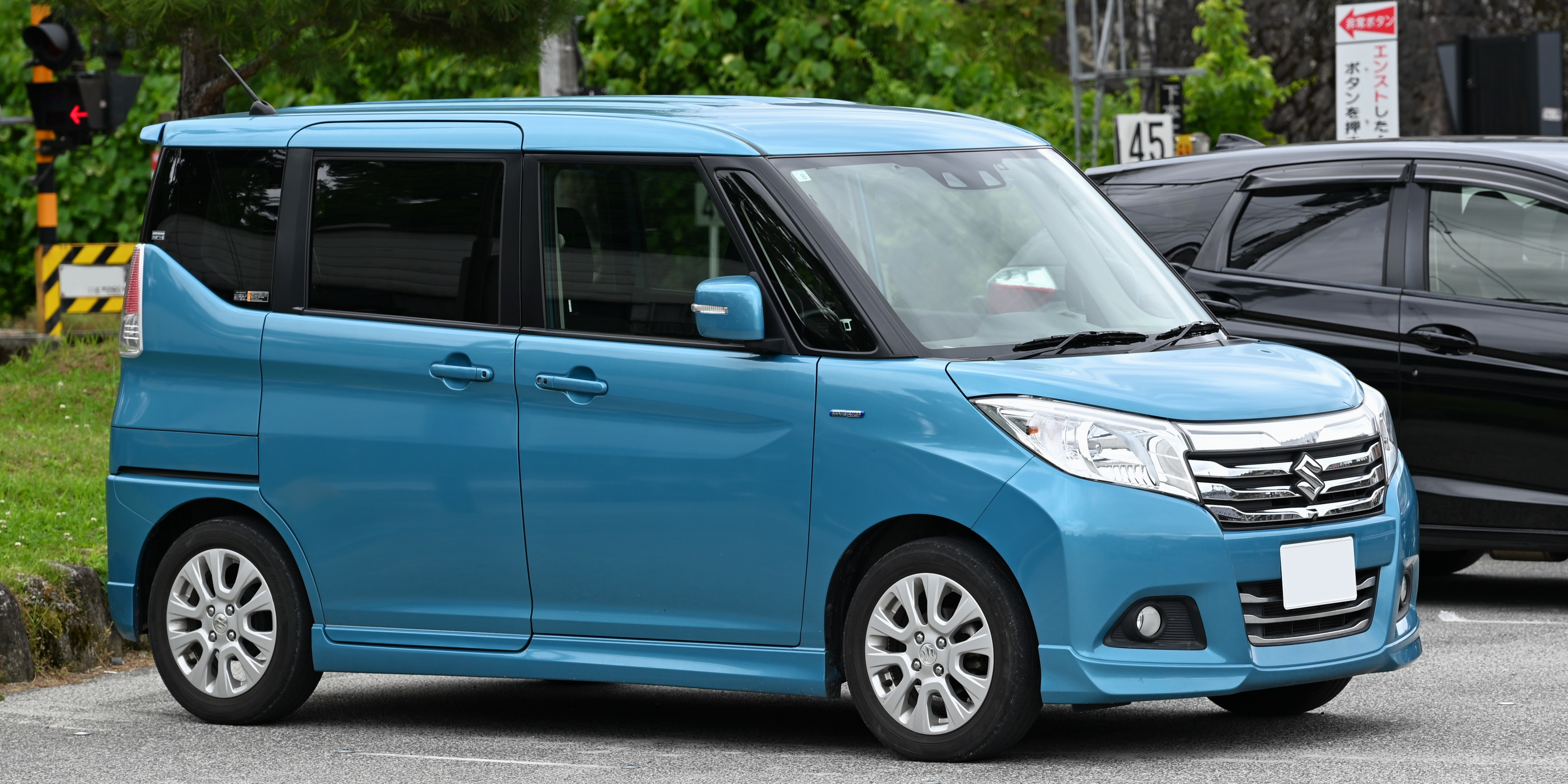
Suzuki Solio Hybrid MZ (facelift)

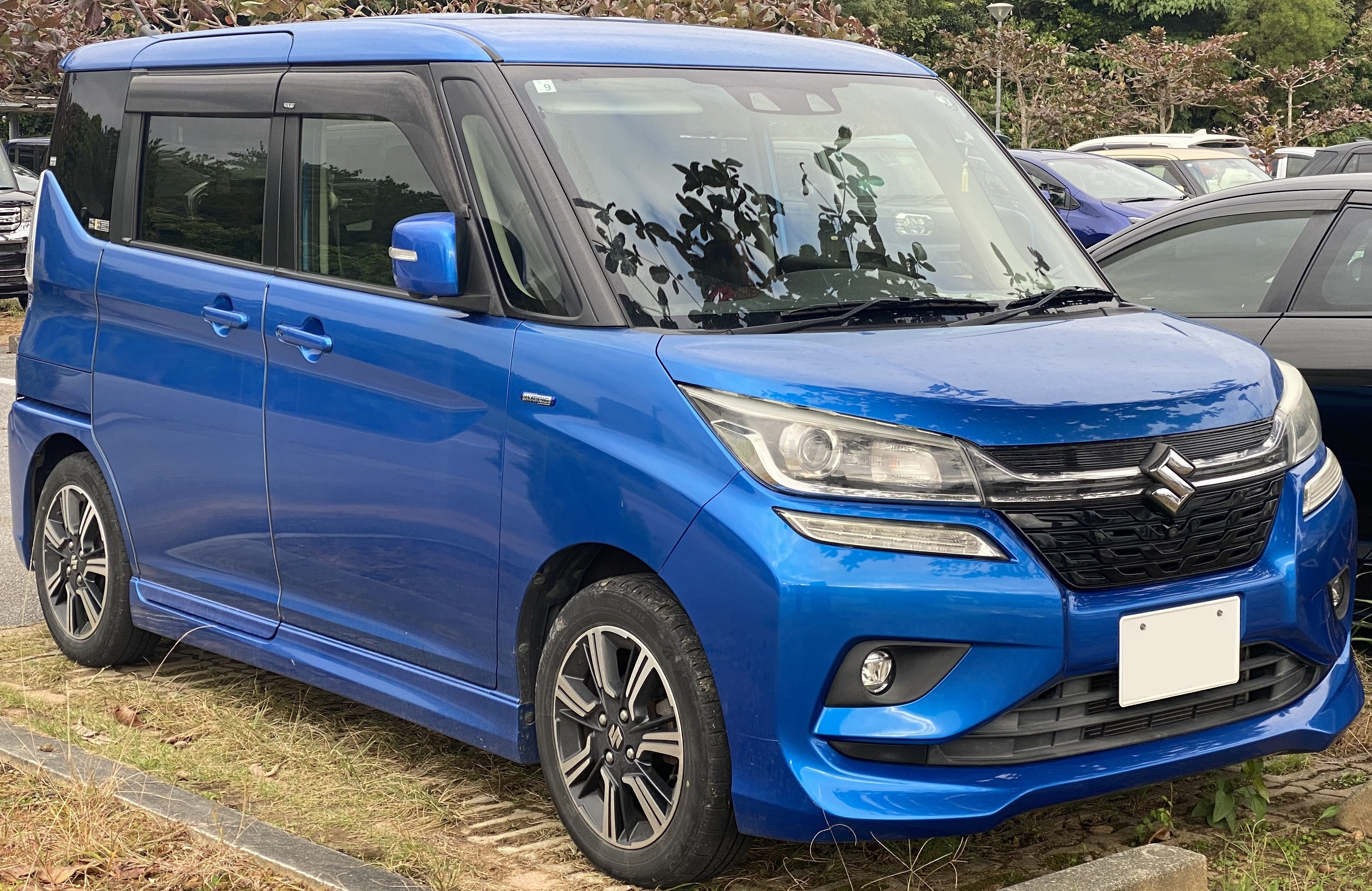
Suzuki Solio Bandit Hybrid (facelift)

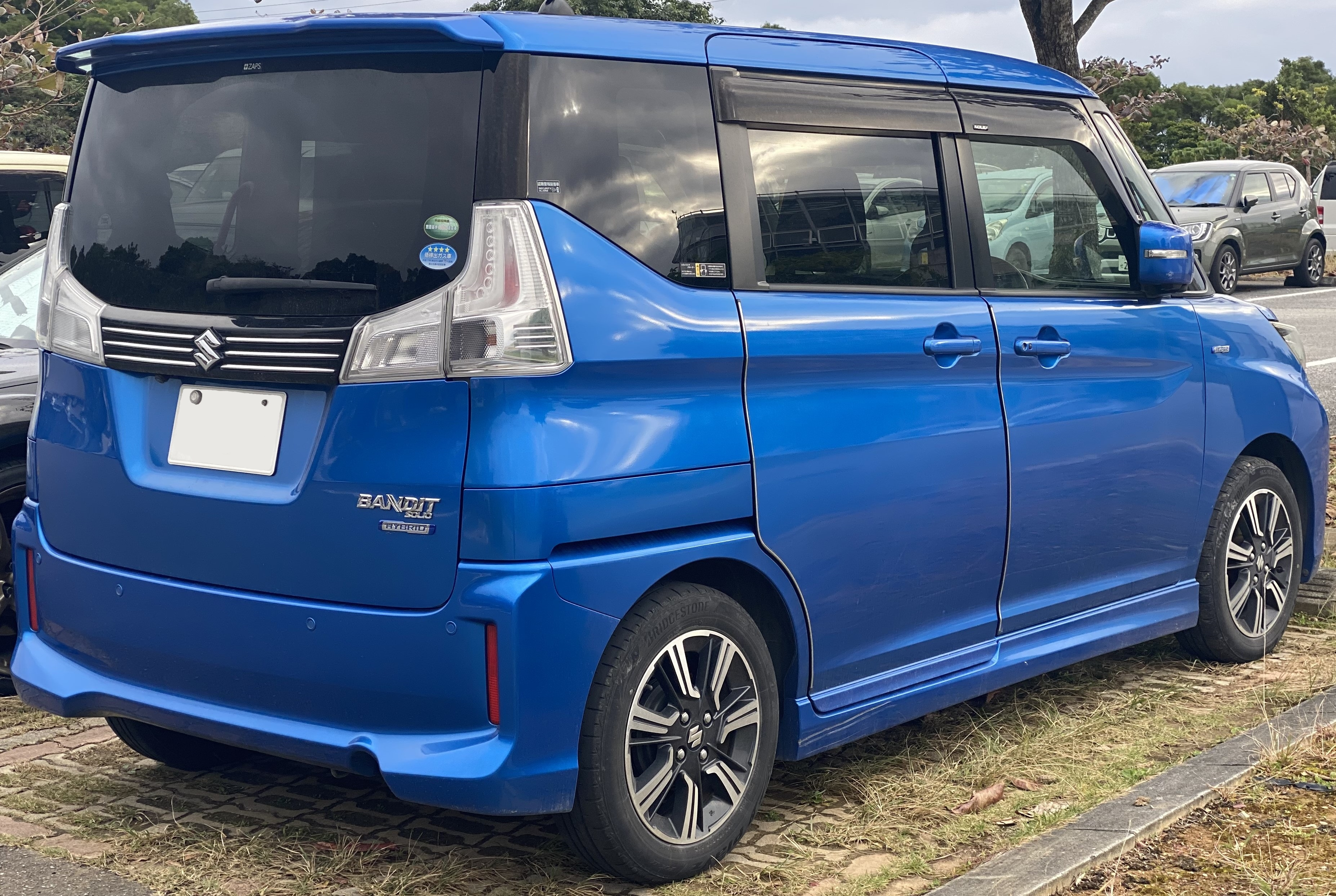
Suzuki Solio Bandit Hybrid (facelift)

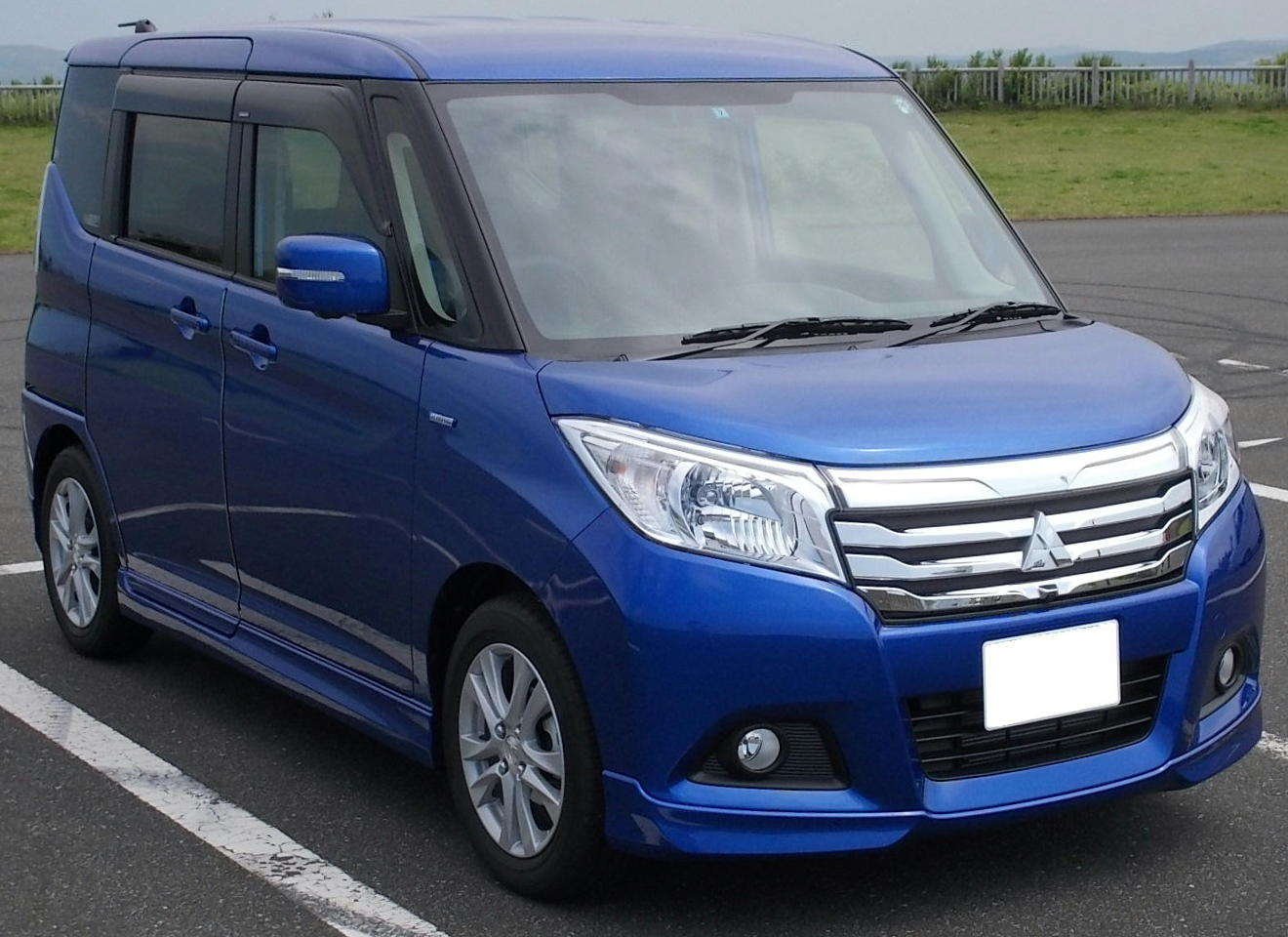
Mitsubishi Delica D:2

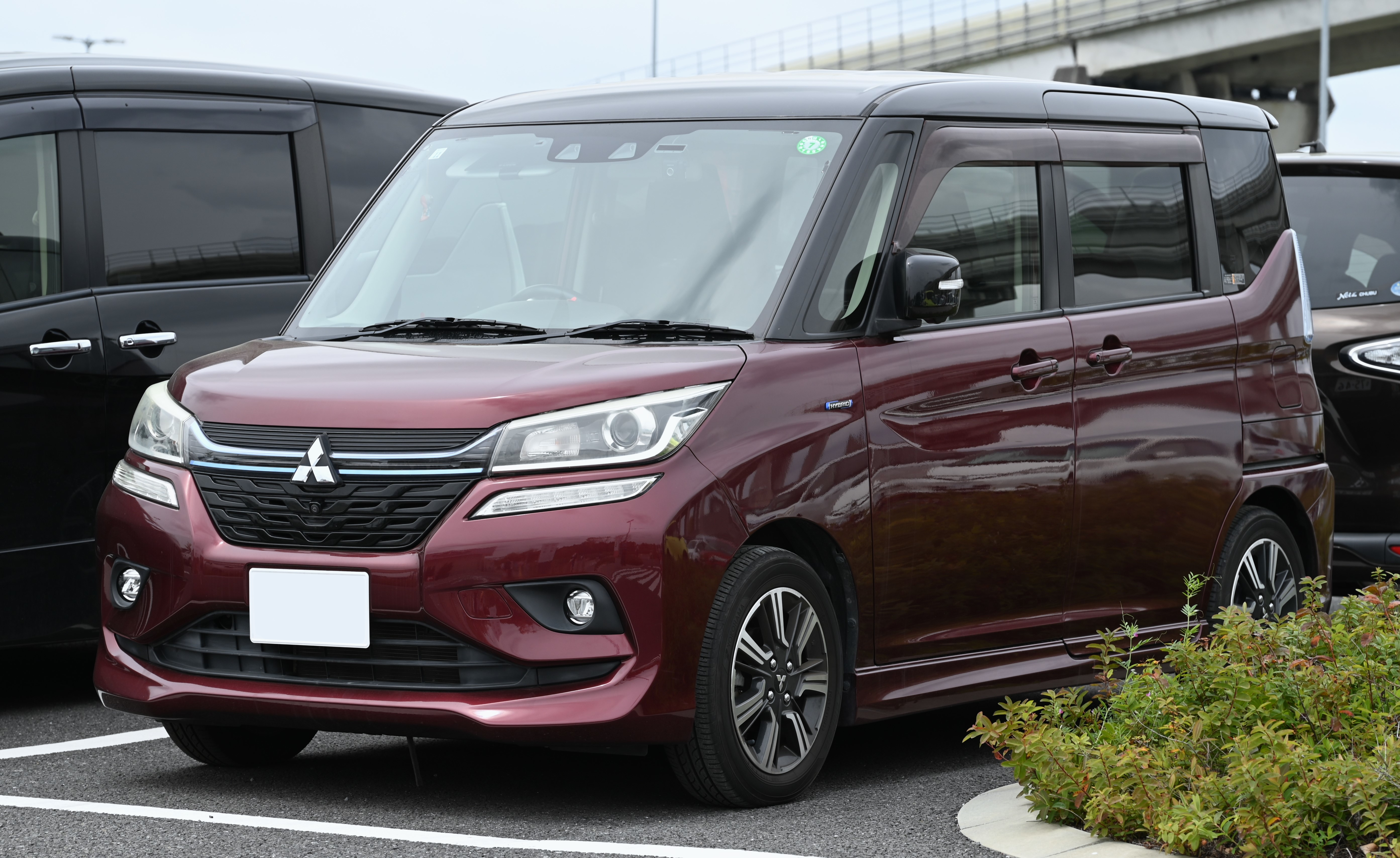
Mitsubishi Delica D:2 Custom (facelift)

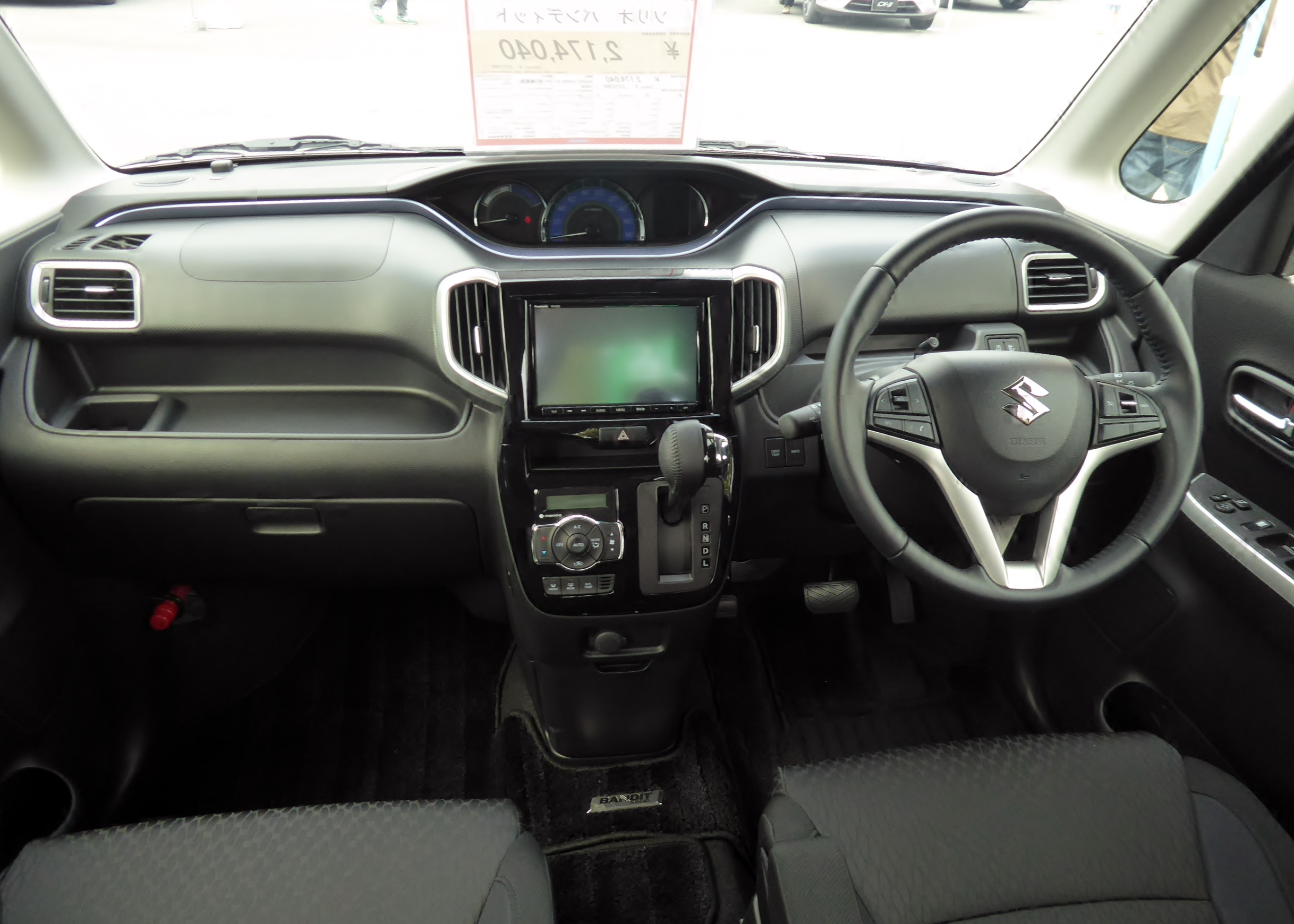
Interior

== Fourth generation (MA27S/MA37S/MAD7S; 2020) ==
Fourth generation
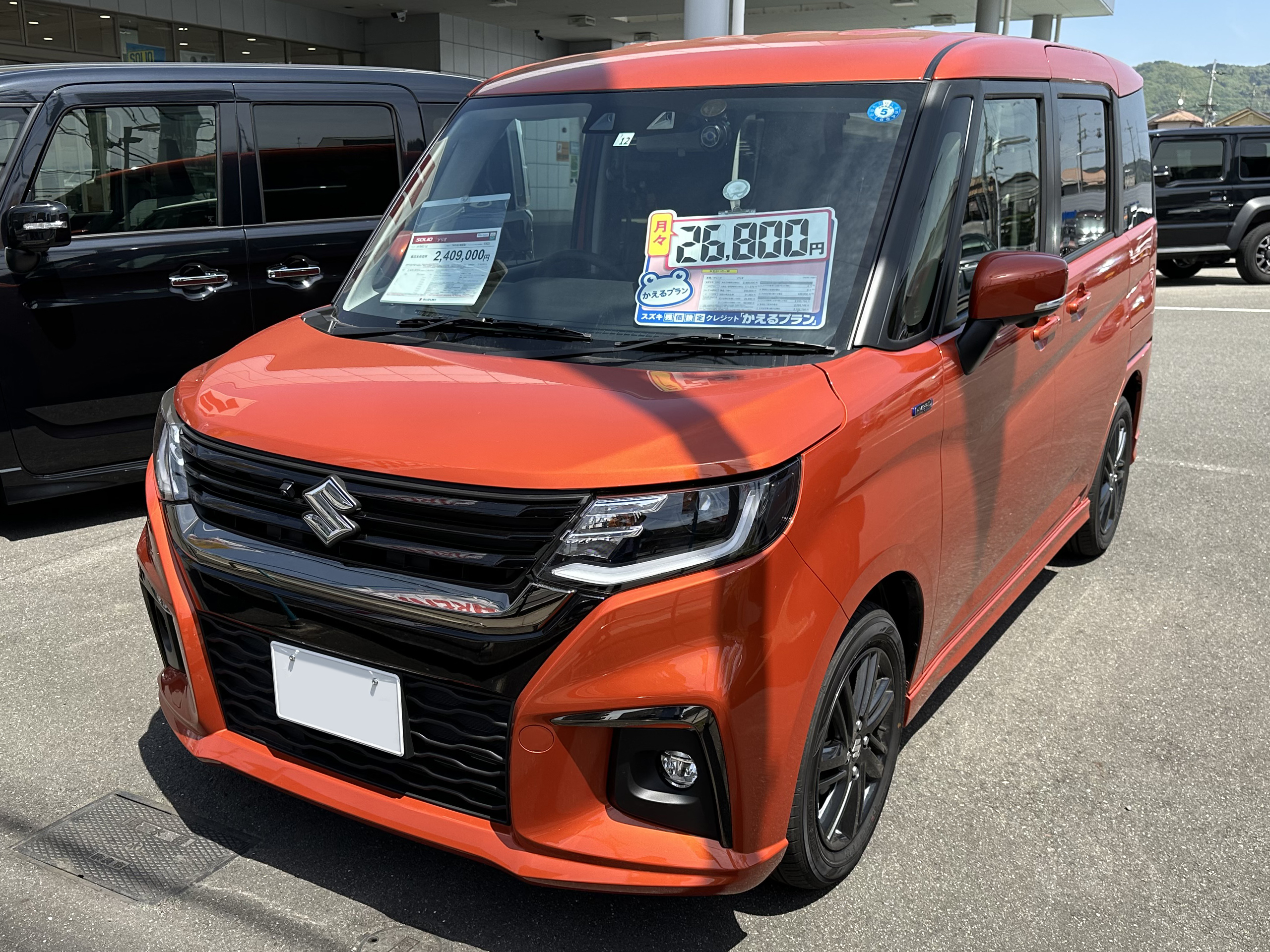
- 2022 Suzuki Solio Hybrid SZ (pre-facelift)

Overview
- Model code: MA27S/MA37S/MAD7S
- Also called: Mitsubishi Delica D:2
- Production: 2020–present
- Assembly: Japan: Makinohara, Shizuoka (Sagara plant)

Body and chassis
- Platform: HEARTECT platform

Powertrain
- Engine: 1197 cc Z12E I3 (2025–present); 1242 cc K12C DOHC VVT Dualjet I4 (2020–2025)
- Electric motor: WA05A/WA06D (MHEV)
- Transmission: CVT

Dimensions
- Wheelbase: 2,480 mm (97.6 in)
- Length: 3,790 mm (149.2 in)
- Width: 1,645 mm (64.8 in)
- Height: 1,745 mm (68.7 in)
- Curb weight: 960–1,000 kg (2,116–2,205 lb); 1,000–1,040 kg (2,205–2,293 lb) (hybrid)

The fourth-generation Solio was released in Japan on 25 November 2020.

It was initially available only with the petrol 1.2-litre, four-cylinder K12C engine, with mild hybrid drive available as an option. In December 2022 a full hybrid model was added. In January 2025, the new, three-cylinder Z12E engine of slightly smaller displacement replaced the original version.

The facelift model was released in January 2025.

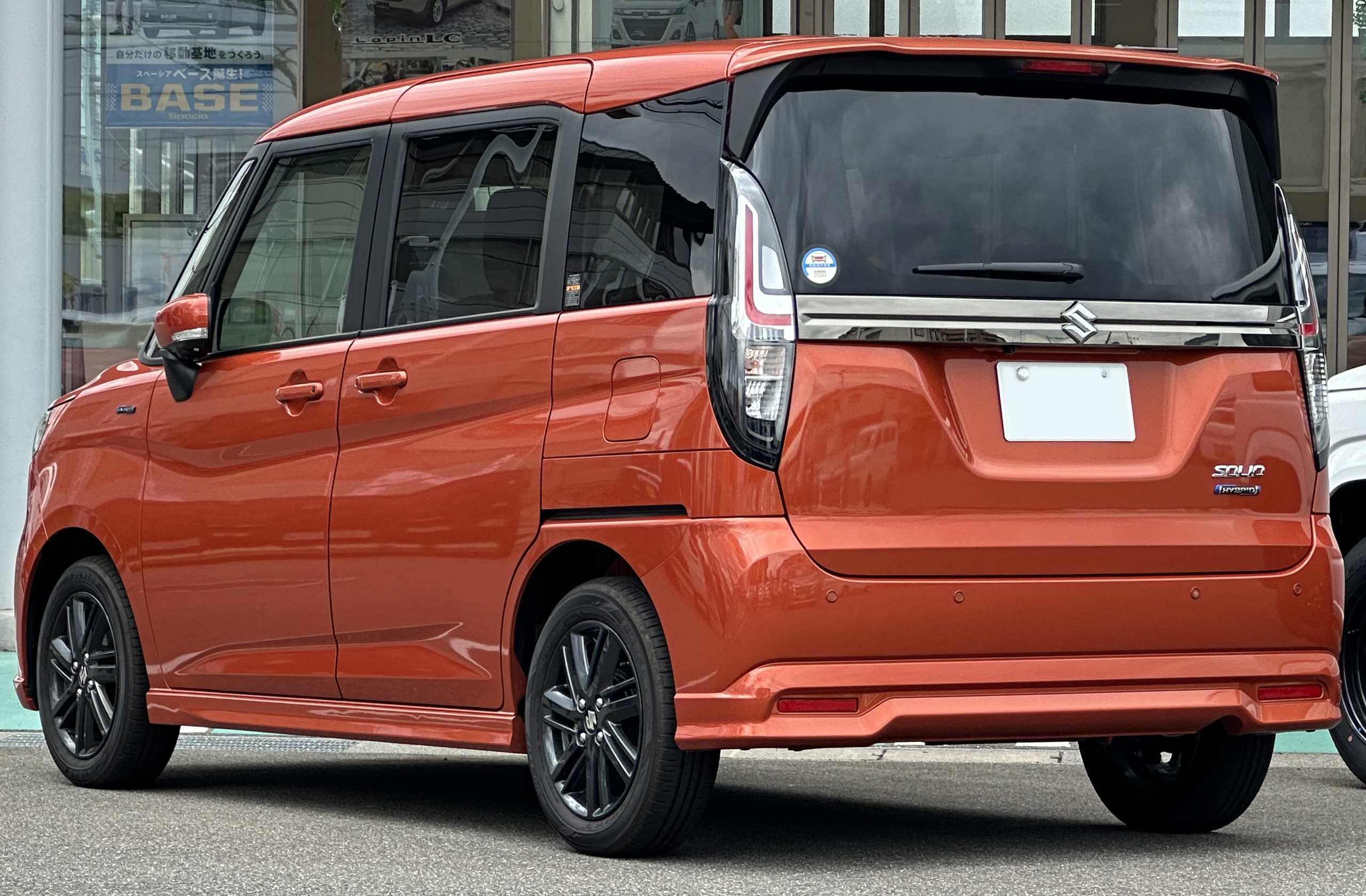
Rear view (pre-facelift)

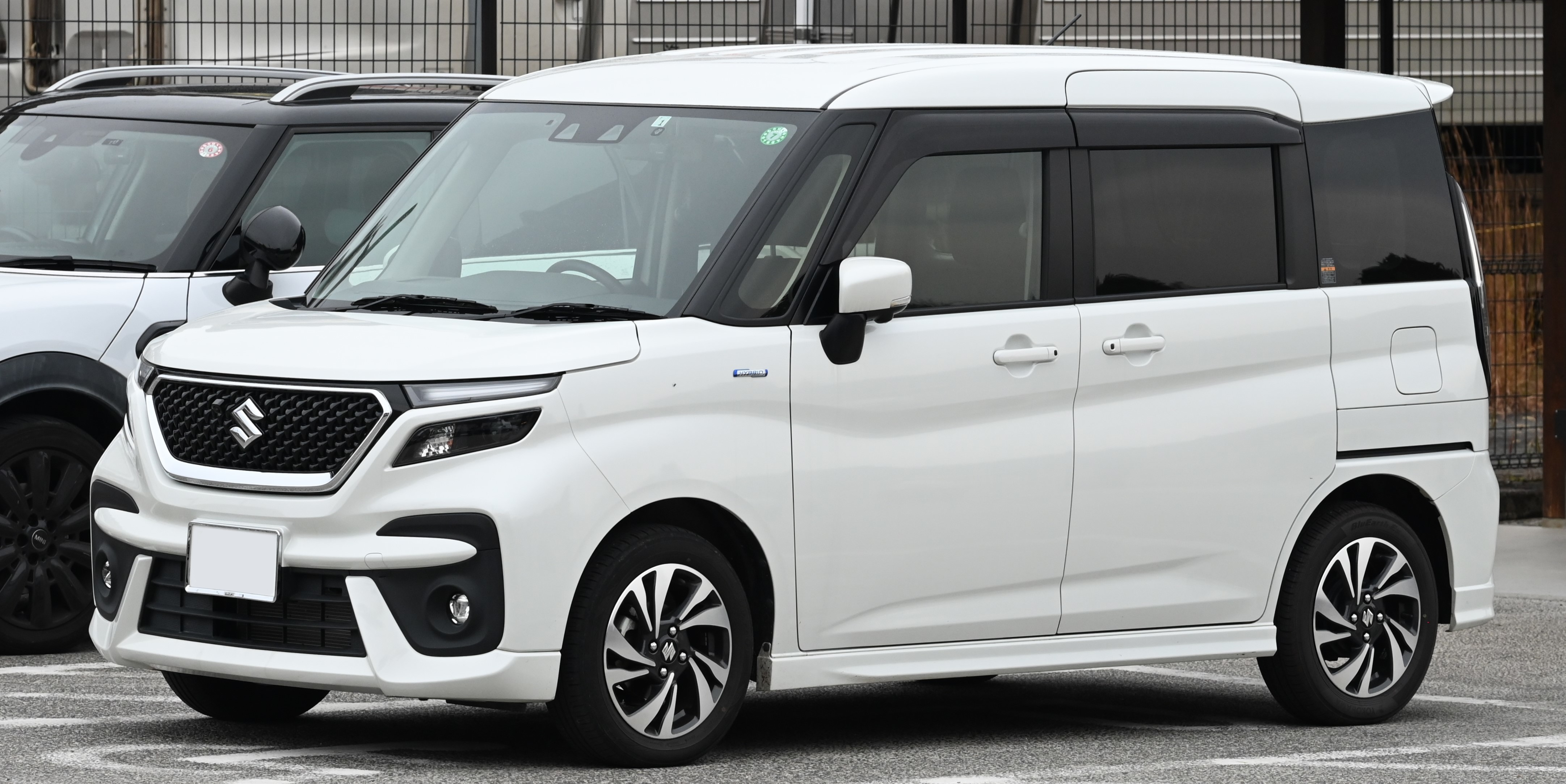
Suzuki Solio Bandit Hybrid MV (pre-facelift)

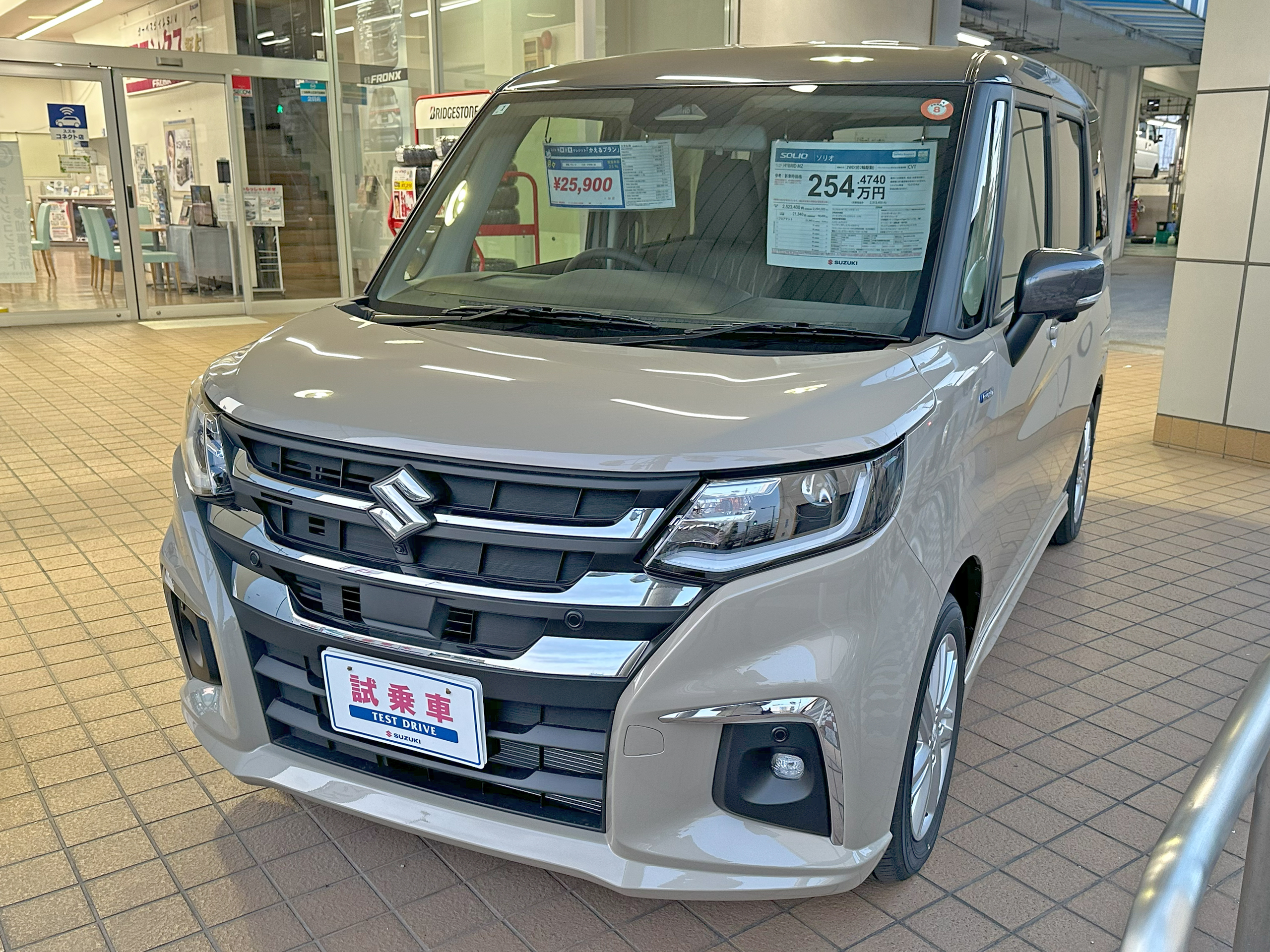
Suzuki Solio Hybrid MZ (facelift)

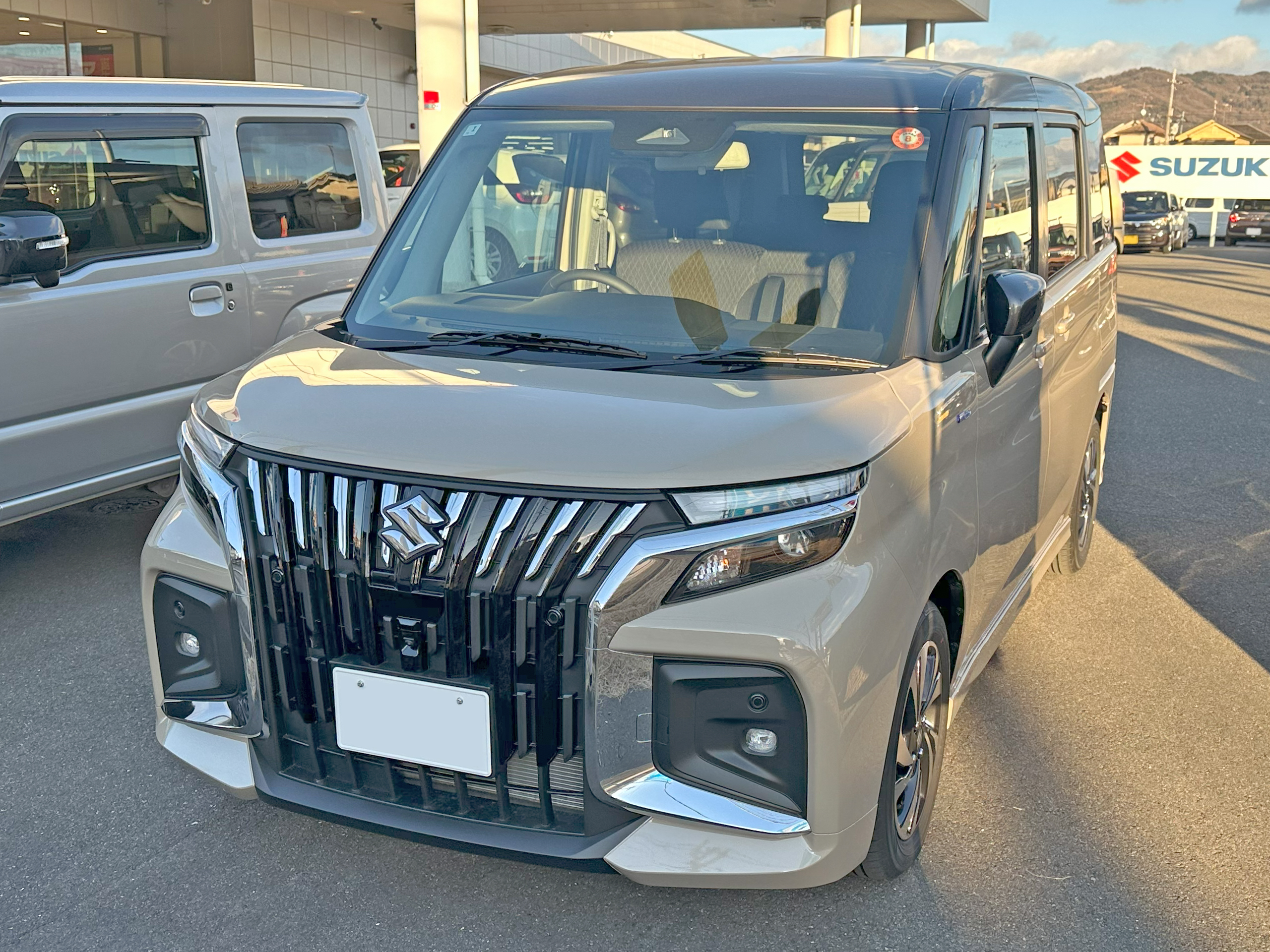
Suzuki Solio Bandit Hybrid MV (facelift)

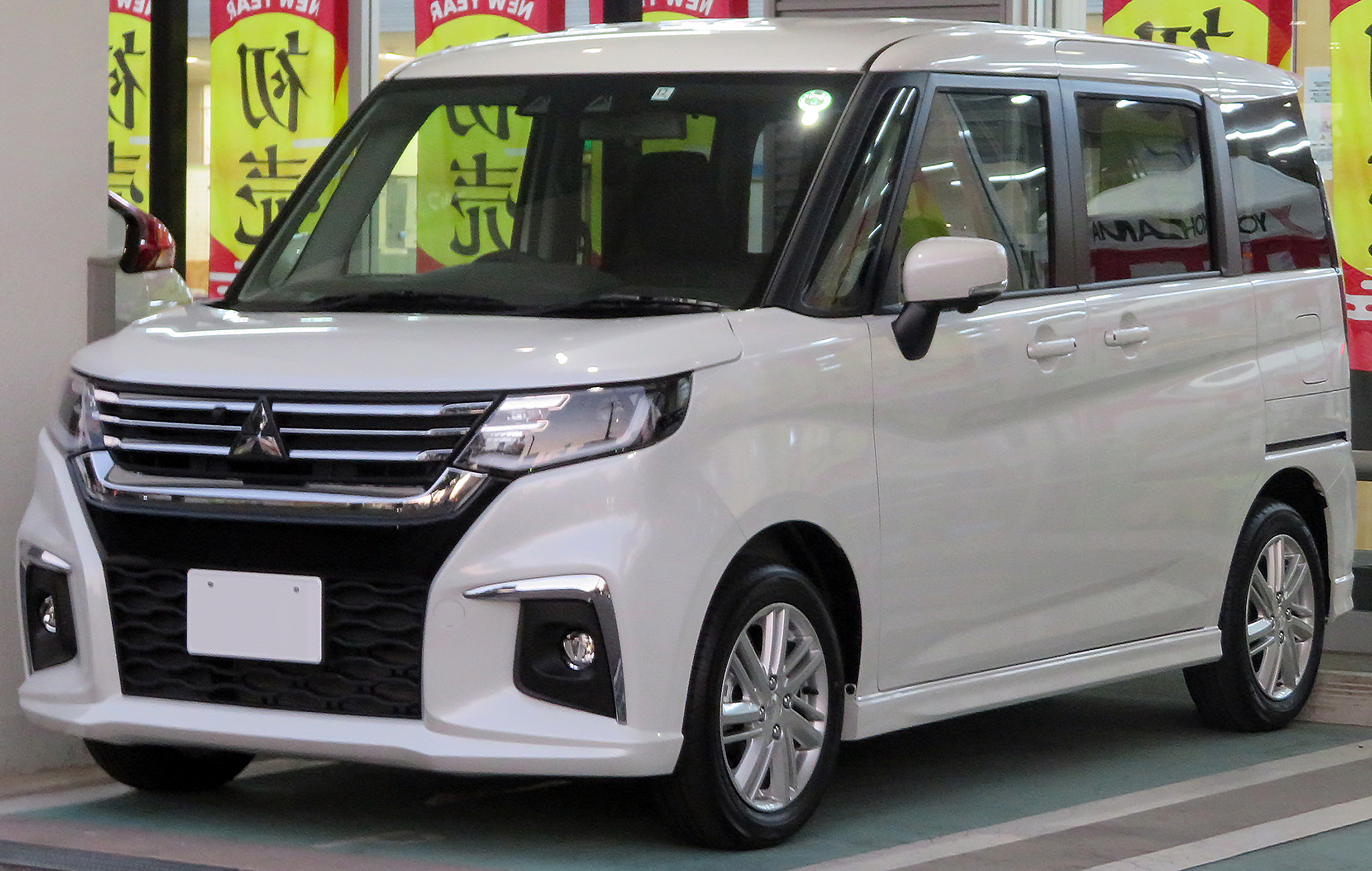
2021 Mitsubishi Delica D:2 Hybrid MZ 4WD (MB37S)

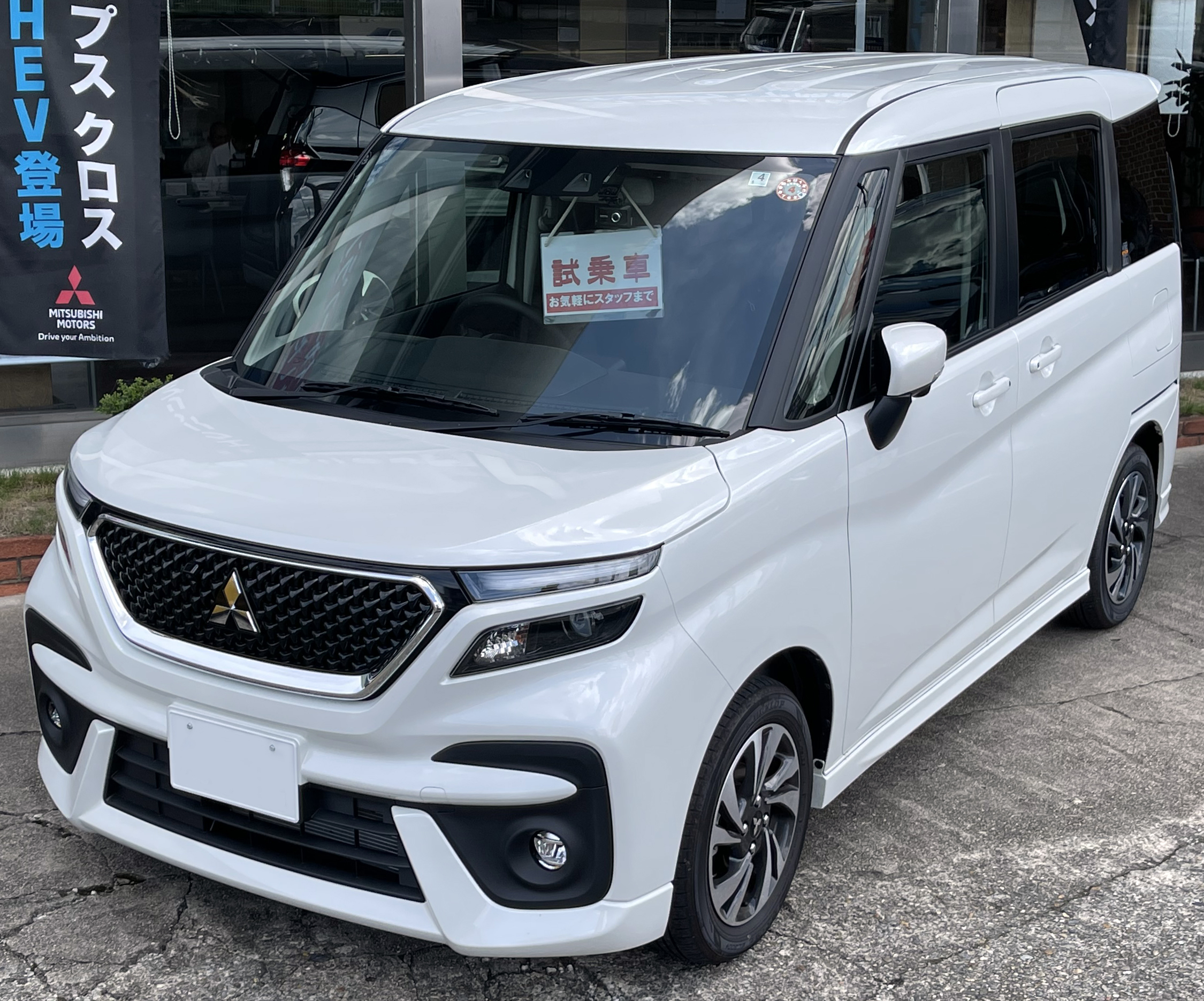
2021 Mitsubishi Delica D:2 Custom Hybrid MV 2WD (MB37S)

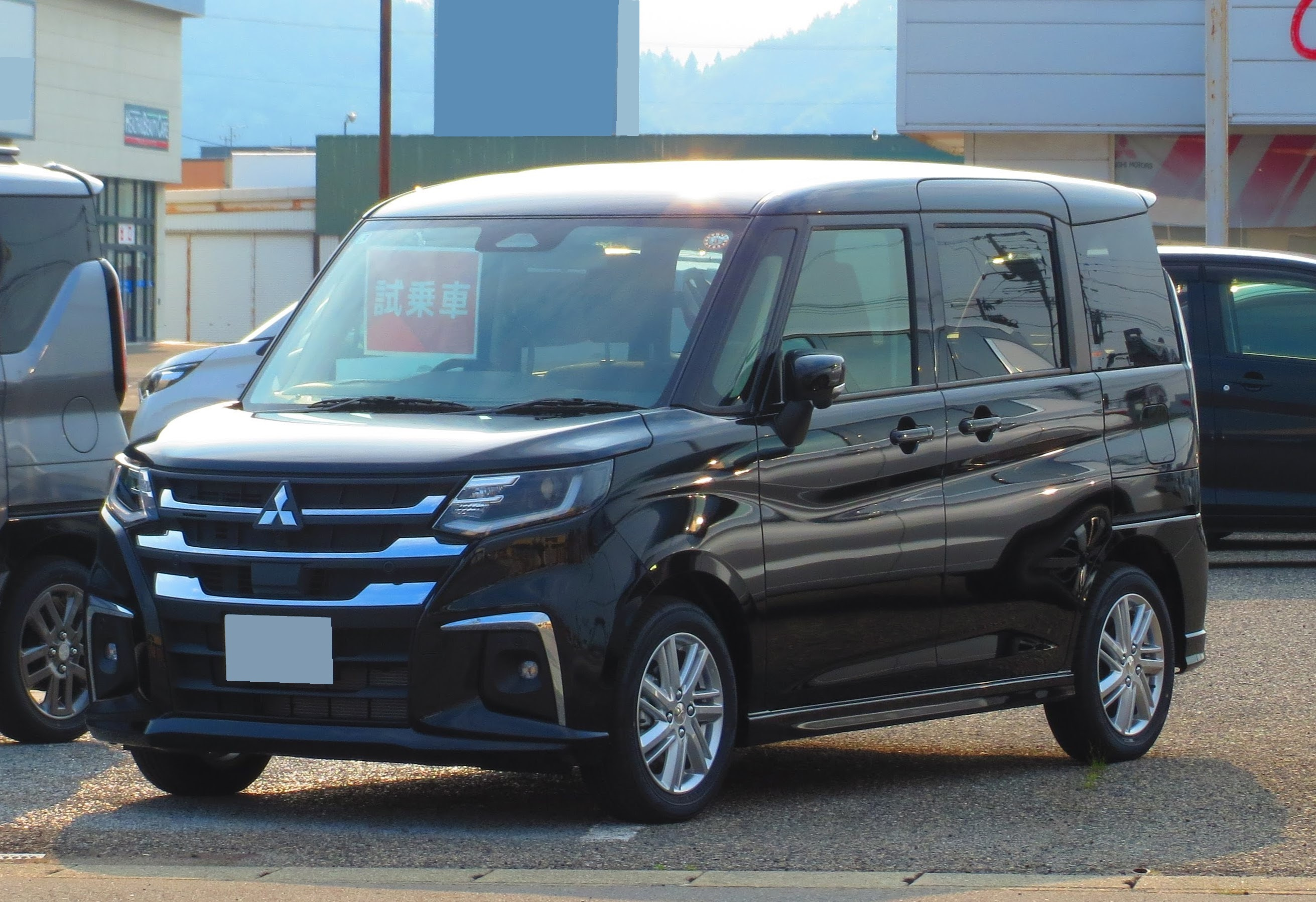
2025 Mitsubishi Delica D:2 Hybrid MZ 4WD (MBD7S, facelift)

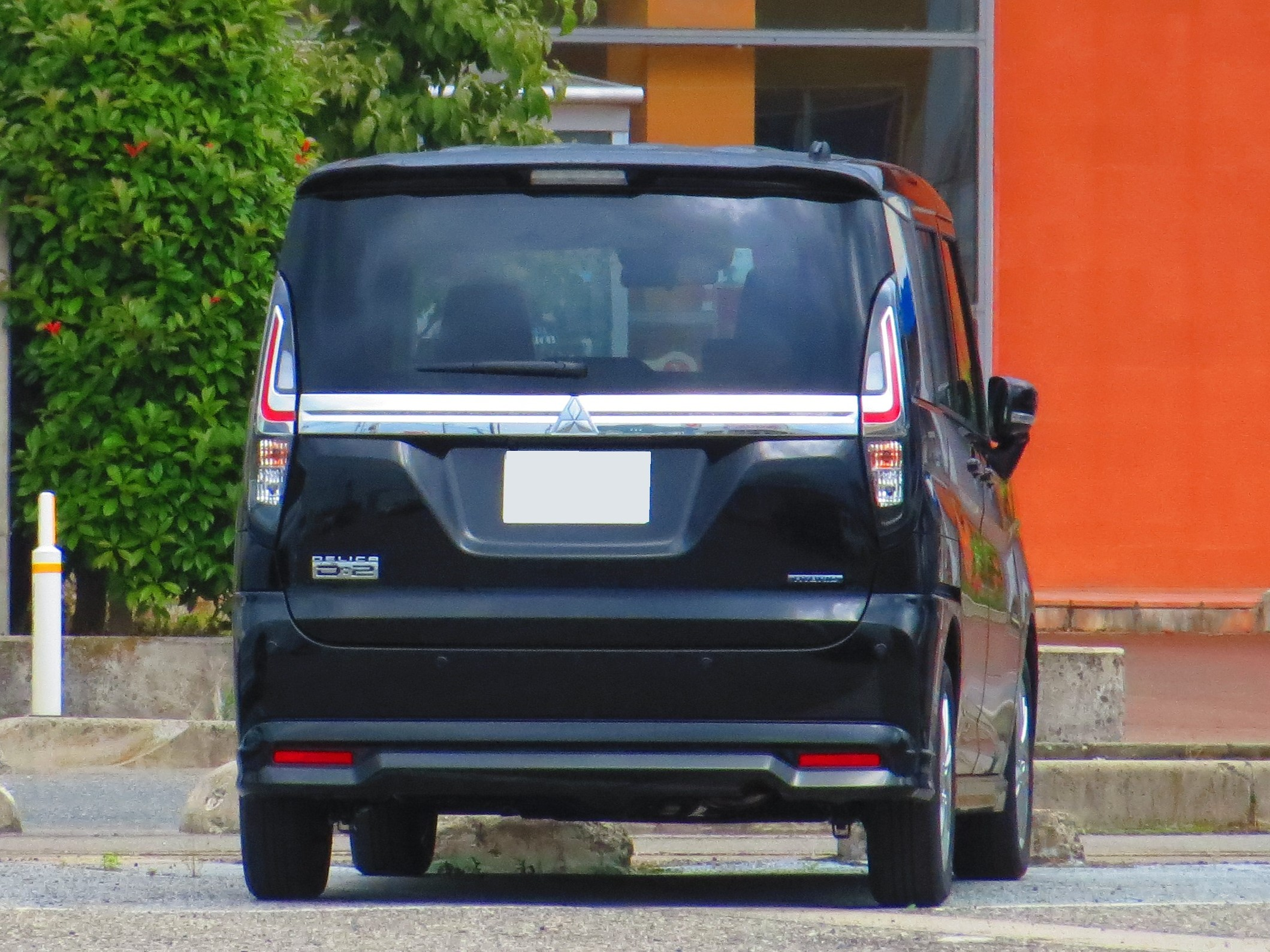
Rear view (facelift)

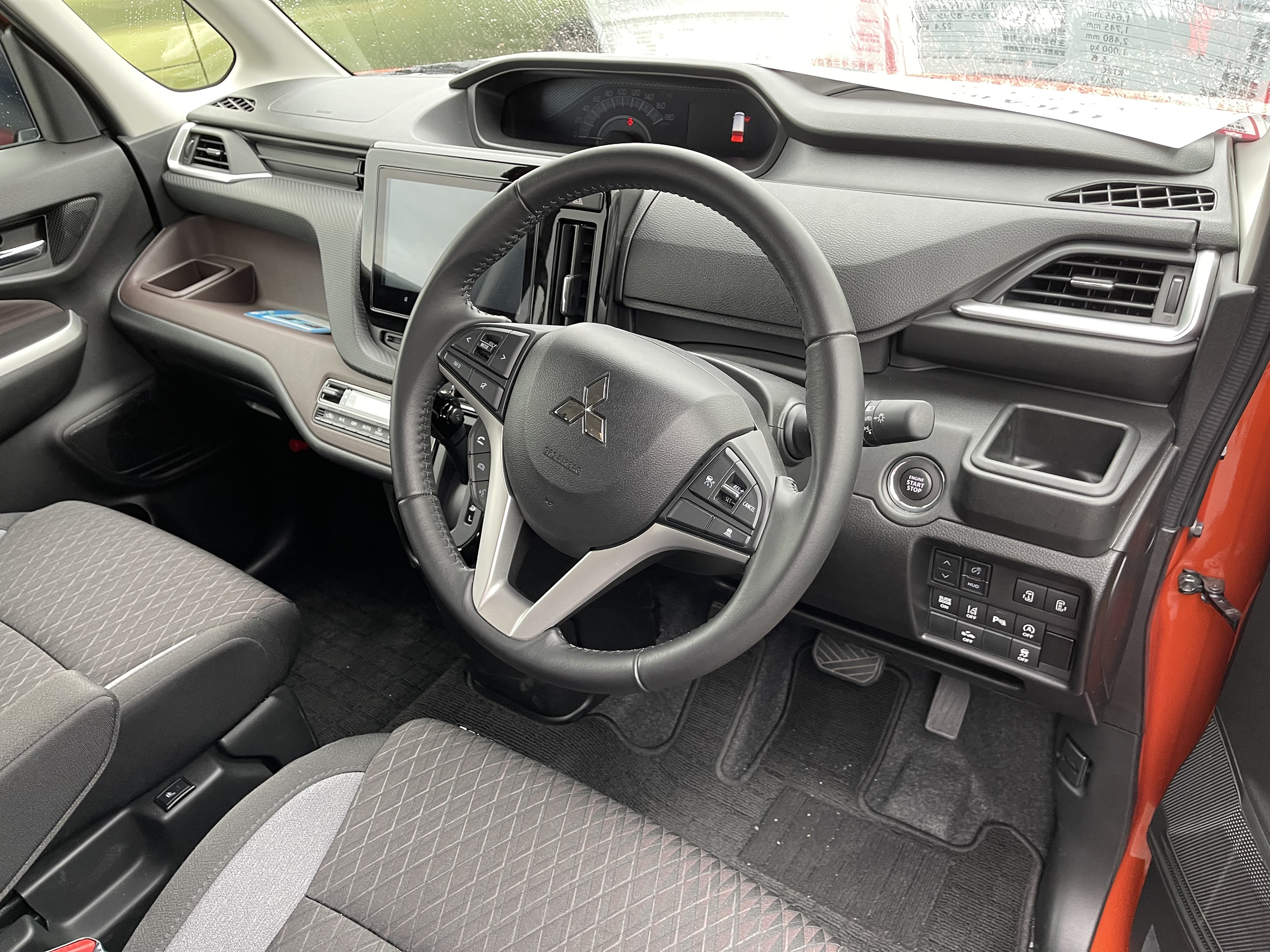
Mitsubishi Delica D:2 interior

== Sales ==
Year	Japan
2011	36,902
2012	38,877
2013	30,296
2014	32,857
2015	38,488
2016	48,814
2017	49,742
2018	44,884
2019	44,488
2020	40,342
2021	44,713
2022	41,590
2023	47,983
2024	52,404
