= List of Suzuki automobiles =

This is a list of Suzuki automobiles from past and present. Most are designed and manufactured by Suzuki, while some vehicles are produced by other companies and supplied to Suzuki through an OEM supply basis. Many models are limited to some regions, while some others are marketed worldwide.

== Current models ==
Model				Current generation		Vehicle description
Image	Name(s)	OEM supply	Introduction (cal. year)	Introduction	Main markets	Vehicle description
Hatchbacks
	Alto K10		1979 (nameplate introduction)	2022	India and other emerging markets	Entry-level city car manufactured by Maruti Suzuki in India.
	Baleno	Toyota Glanza; Toyota Starlet	1995 (nameplate introduction); 2015 (global reintroduction)	2022	Global emerging markets	Subcompact (B-segment) hatchback mainly manufactured by Maruti Suzuki in India.
	Celerio/ Cultus	Toyota Vitz	2008	2014 2021	India and other emerging markets	City car (A-segment) hatchback. Marketed as the Cultus in Pakistan.
	S-Presso		2019	2019	India and other emerging markets	Crossover-styled entry-level city car manufactured by Maruti Suzuki in India.
	Swift		1984 (nameplate introduction); 2004	2023	Global	Subcompact (B-segment) hatchback.
	Wagon R		1999	2019	India and other emerging markets	Tall-height city car hatchback mainly manufactured by Maruti Suzuki in India.
Sedans
	Dzire / Swift Sedan		2008	2024	India and other emerging markets	Notchback sedan version of the Swift manufactured by Maruti Suzuki in India. Sold as Swift Sedan in Colombia and Guatemala.
SUVs
	Across	Toyota RAV4 (original model)	1995 (nameplate introduction, originally used on motorcycle); 2020	2026	Europe	Plug-in hybrid compact crossover SUV. Rebadged Toyota RAV4 (XA60).
	Brezza		2016	2022	India and other right-hand drive emerging markets in Asia and Africa.	Subcompact crossover SUV occupying the sub-4 metre segment in India. Known as the Vitara Brezza until 2022.
	e Vitara	Toyota Urban Cruiser; Toyota Urban Cruiser Ebella (India)	2025	2025	Global	Battery electric subcompact crossover SUV.
	Fronx	Toyota Urban Cruiser Taisor; Toyota Starlet Cross	2023	2023	Global emerging markets	Subcompact crossover SUV with a sloping roofline.
	Grand Vitara	Toyota Urban Cruiser; Toyota Urban Cruiser Hyryder (India)	1998 (nameplate introduction)	2022	Global emerging markets	Subcompact crossover SUV. Strong hybrid powertrain available only in India.
	Jimny		1970	2018	Global	Three-door off-roader based on the kei-sized, Japan-only Jimny. Sold as the Jimny Sierra and Jimny Nomade (5 door) in Japan and several other markets.
	SX4 S-Cross		2006	2021	Global	Subcompact crossover SUV.
	Victoris/Across		2025	2025	Global emerging markets	Subcompact crossover SUV.
	Vitara		1988	2015	Global (except India and others)	Subcompact crossover SUV smaller than the SX4 S-Cross.
	Xbee		2017	2017	Japan	Crossover city car for the Japanese market.
MPVs / Minivans
	APV	Mitsubishi Maven (2005–2009)	2004	2004	Indonesia and other emerging markets	Rear-wheel drive, mid-engined compact van manufactured by Suzuki Indomobil Motor in Indonesia. Panel van version is available.
	Eeco		1999 (original model)	2001	India	Rear-wheel drive, mid-engined small van manufactured and marketed by Maruti Suzuki in India. Renamed Suzuki Every Plus, previously known as Maruti Suzuki Versa. Panel van version is available.
	Ertiga	Toyota Rumion	2012	2018	India, Indonesia and other emerging markets	Three-row compact MPV mainly produced in India, Indonesia and Myanmar.
	Invicto	Toyota Innova (original model)	2023	2023	India	Three-row C-segment MPV, rebadged Toyota Innova HyCross.
	Landy	Toyota Noah (original model)	2007	2022	Japan	Three-row minivan with sliding doors, only sold in Japan. Rebadged Toyota Noah, previously a rebadge of Nissan Serena from 2007–2022.
	Solio	Mitsubishi Delica D:2	2000	2020	Japan, Hong Kong and Macau	Two-row minivan with sliding doors, only sold in Japan.
	XL6/XL7/ Ertiga XL7		2019	2019	India, Indonesia, Mexico and other emerging markets	Crossover-styled version of the Ertiga. Pre-facelift model pictured.
Kei cars (passenger)
	Alto	Mazda Carol	1979	2014 2021	Japan and Pakistan	Entry-level, low-roof hatchback kei car with hinged rear doors. The previous generation is still produced and marketed in Pakistan.
	Alto Lapin		2002	2015	Japan	Retro-styled low-roof hatchback kei car with hinged rear doors.
	e Sky		2026	2026	Japan	Battery electric semi-tall height wagon kei car.
	Every Wagon	Mazda Scrum Wagon; Mitsubishi Town Box; Nissan NV100 Clipper Rio	1999	2015	Japan	Passenger variant of Every van.
	Hustler	Mazda Flair Crossover	2014	2020	Japan, Hong Kong and Macau	Semi-tall height rugged crossover SUV-styled kei car.
	Jimny (Japan, kei)		1970	2018	Japan	Off-road kei car.
	Spacia	Mazda Flair Wagon	2013	2023	Japan	Tall-height wagon kei car with rear sliding doors. (except Gear).
	Wagon R	Mazda Flair	1993	2017	Japan	Semi-tall height wagon kei car with hinged rear doors.
	Wagon R Smile		2021	2021	Japan	Retro-styled kei car with rear sliding doors using the Wagon R nameplate.

=== Commercial vehicles ===
Model				Current generation		Vehicle description
Image	Name(s)	OEM supply	Introduction (cal. year)	Introduction	Main markets	Vehicle description
	Carry (global)		1961	2019	Indonesia and other emerging markets	Cab chassis truck manufactured by Suzuki in Indonesia.
	Super Carry		1985 (nameplate introduction); 2016	2016	India and other emerging markets	Cab chassis truck manufactured by Maruti Suzuki in India based on the styling of 1991–2019 Indonesian-market Carry Futura.
Kei vehicles (commercial)
	Carry	Mazda Scrum Truck; Mitsubishi Minicab Truck; Nissan NT100 Clipper	1961	2013	Japan	Mid-engined cab over kei pickup truck.
	e Every	Daihatsu e-Hijet (original model); Toyota Pixis BEV	2026	2026	Japan	Battery electric microvan, rebadged Daihatsu E-Hijet.
	Every	Mazda Scrum Van; Mitsubishi Minicab Van; Nissan NV100 Clipper	1982	2015	Japan, Hong Kong, Pakistan and Macau	Commercial van based on Every Wagon passenger van.
	Spacia Base		2022		Japan	Commercial van based on Spacia Custom.

== Former models ==
Model	Introduced	Discontinued	Notes	Image
Maruti 800	1983	2014		
Suzuki Alto (Europe)/A-Star	2008	2018	International version from Suzuki Alto	
Suzuki Aerio/Liana	2001	2018	A subcompact car. Hatchback model was available	
Suzuki Bolan	1983	2024	Pakistan market version of ST40 Carry	
Suzuki Cappuccino	1991	1998		
Suzuki Cara	1993	1994	Rebadged version of Autozam AZ-1	
Suzuki Cervo	1977 (original model); 2006	1998 (original model); 2011 (For 2006 launch)		
Suzuki Ciaz	2014	2025		
Suzuki Cultus/Esteem/Forsa	1983	2016		
Suzuki Cultus Crescent/Esteem/Baleno	1995	2007		
Suzuki CV1	1981	1985	A Microcar	
Suzuki Every Plus/Landy	1999	2005	Minivan and export version of the fourth generation Every	
Suzuki Equator	2008	2012	Mid-size pickup truck based on the Nissan Frontier	
Suzuki Forenza/Reno	2008	2012	Rebadged of the international market Daewoo Lacetti for US market	
Suzuki Fronte	1962	1989	From fifth generation it was sold paralleled with Suzuki Alto	
Suzuki Fun	2004	2011	Rebadged of the Chevrolet Celta for Argentina market	
Suzuki Futura	1991	2019	A deritative model of the Suzuki Carry. In Indonesia it was sold paralleled with the smaller ST100 Carry until 2009	
Suzuki Ignis	2000 2016	2016 2026		
Suzuki Karimun	1999	2005	Indonesian market version of Suzuki Wagon R	
Suzuki Karimun Wagon R	2013	2021	Indonesian market version of Maruti Suzuki Wagon R	
Suzuki Kei	1999	2009		
Suzuki Kizashi	2009	2016		
Suzuki Mega Carry/APV pickup	2004	2019	Pick-up version of the Suzuki APV	
Suzuki Mehran	1988	2019	Pakistani market version of the sixth generation Fronte	
Suzuki Mighty Boy	1988	2019		
Suzuki MR Wagon	1999	2016		
Suzuki Neo Baleno	2008	2012	Indonesian market version of the first SX4 Sedan	
Suzuki Palette	2008	2013		
Suzuki Ravi	2008	2013	Pakistani market version of the ST40 Carry van	
Suzuki Sidekick	1989	2001	Sister car of the Vitara	
Suzuki Splash	2007	2018		
Suzuki Suzulight	1955	1968	A nameplate of the Kei car range. The first four-wheeled Suzuki.	
Suzuki Swace	2020	2025	Rebadged from E210 Corolla Touring	
Suzuki Swift+	2003	2010	Rebadged from Daewoo Kalos	
Suzuki Twin	2003	2005		
Suzuki Verona	2003	2006		
Suzuki Wagon R+	1999	2000 (European markets until 2008)	A Mini MPV version of the Suzuki Wagon R	
Suzuki X-90	1995	1997		
Suzuki XL-7	1998	2009	Full-size SUV	
Suzuki Zen Estilo/Estilo/Karimun Estilo	2006	2012	An enlarged version of the first generation MR Wagon. Sold exclusive in India and Indonesia	

== Rebadged vehicles ==
Since 1985, Suzuki has shared or produced automobiles for other manufacturers around the world.

=== Donor ===
Changan

- Chana Star – China (Suzuki Carry/Every Plus)
- Changan Alto – China (Suzuki Alto)
- Changan SC series – China (Suzuki Carry/Every Plus)
- Hafei Songhuajiang – China (Suzuki Carry)
- Oshan Qiyue – China (Suzuki Ciaz)

Changhe

- Changhe Beidouxing – China (Suzuki Wagon R)
- Changhe Coolcar – China (Suzuki Every Plus)
- Changhe Liana – China (Suzuki Liana)
- Changhe Splash – China (Suzuki Splash)

Fiat

- Fiat Sedici – Europe (Suzuki SX4)
- Lancia Pangea – Europe (Suzuki SX4) (cancelled)

Ford

- Ford Pronto – Taiwan (Suzuki Carry/Every)

General Motors

- Asüna Sunrunner – Canada (Suzuki Sidekick/Vitara)
- Bedford Rascal – Europe (Suzuki Carry)
- Chevrolet Alto – Colombia (Suzuki Alto)
- Chevrolet Cassia – Philippines (Suzuki Cultus Crescent)
- Chevrolet Cruze – Japan (Suzuki Swift)
- Chevrolet Damas - Uzbekistan (Suzuki Every)
- Chevrolet Esteem – Colombia (Suzuki Cultus Crescent)
- Chevrolet Forsa – Ecuador (Suzuki Cultus)
- Chevrolet Grand Nomad – South America (Suzuki XL-7)
- Chevrolet Labo - Uzbekistan (Suzuki Carry)
- Chevrolet MW – Japan (Suzuki Solio)
- Chevrolet Sprint – United States/Canada (Suzuki Cultus)
- Chevrolet Super Carry – South America (Suzuki Carry)
- Chevrolet Swift – South America (Suzuki Cultus)
- Chevrolet SX4 S-Cross – Ecuador (Suzuki S-Cross)
- Chevrolet Tracker – United States/Canada (Suzuki Sidekick/Vitara)
- Chevrolet Vitara – South America (Suzuki Sidekick/Vitara)
- Chevrolet Wagon R+ – Colombia (Suzuki Wagon R+)
- Daewoo Damas - South Korea/Uzbekistan/Vietnam (Suzuki Every)
- Daewoo Labo - South Korea/Uzbekistan (Suzuki Carry)
- Daewoo Tico - South Korea/Europe/South America (Suzuki Alto)
- Geo Metro – United States (Suzuki Cultus)
- Geo Tracker – United States (Suzuki Sidekick/Vitara)
- GMC Tracker – Canada (Suzuki Sidekick/Vitara)
- GME Rascal – Europe (Suzuki Carry)
- Holden Barina – Australia & New Zealand (Suzuki Cultus)
- Holden Cruze – Australia (Suzuki Ignis)
- Holden Drover – Australia & New Zealand (Suzuki Sierra/Jimny)
- Holden Scurry – Australia (Suzuki Carry)
- Opel Agila – Europe (Suzuki Wagon R+ and Suzuki Splash)
- Pontiac Firefly – Canada (Suzuki Cultus)
- Pontiac Sunrunner – Canada (Suzuki Sidekick/Vitara)
- Vauxhall Agila – United Kingdom (Suzuki Wagon R+ and Suzuki Splash)
- Vauxhall Rascal – United Kingdom (Suzuki Carry)

Isuzu

- Isuzu Geminett – Japan (Suzuki Cultus)

Maruti

All Maruti models since the Esteem are referred as Maruti Suzuki

- Maruti 800 – India (Suzuki Alto)
- Maruti 1000 – India (Suzuki Cultus)
- Maruti Gypsy – India (Suzuki Jimny)
- Maruti Omni – India (Suzuki Carry)

Mazda

- Autozam AZ-Wagon – Japan (Suzuki Wagon R)
- Autozam Scrum – Japan (Suzuki Every)
- Mazda AZ-Offroad – Japan (Suzuki Jimny)
- Mazda Carol – Japan (Suzuki Alto)
- Mazda Flair – Japan (Suzuki Wagon R)
- Mazda Flair Wagon – Japan (Suzuki Palette and Suzuki Spacia)
- Mazda Flair Crossover – Japan (Suzuki Hustler)
- Mazda Laputa – Japan (Suzuki Kei)
- Mazda Proceed Levante – Japan (Suzuki Vitara)
- Mazda Scrum – Japan (Suzuki Carry/Every)
- Mazda Scrum Wagon – Japan (Suzuki Every Wagon)
- Mazda Spiano – Japan (Suzuki Lapin)
- Mazda VX-1 – Indonesia (Suzuki Ertiga)

Mitsubishi Motors

- Mitsubishi Colt T120SS – Indonesia (Suzuki Carry Futura)
- Mitsubishi Delica D:2 - Japan (Suzuki Solio)
- Mitsubishi Maven – Indonesia (Suzuki APV)
- Mitsubishi Minicab - Japan (Suzuki Carry/Every)
- Mitsubishi Town Box - Japan (Suzuki Every Wagon)

Nissan

- Nissan Moco – Japan (Suzuki MR Wagon)
- Nissan NT100 Clipper - Japan (Suzuki Carry)
- Nissan NV100 Clipper - Japan (Suzuki Every)
- Nissan NV100 Clipper Rio - Japan (Suzuki Every Wagon)
- Nissan Pino – Japan (Suzuki Alto)
- Nissan Pixo - Europe (Suzuki Alto)
- Nissan Roox – Japan (Suzuki Palette)

Proton

- Proton Ertiga – Malaysia (Suzuki Ertiga)

Santana Motor

- Santana 300/350 - Spain (Suzuki Grand Vitara)

Subaru

- Subaru Justy – Europe (Suzuki Swift and Suzuki Ignis)

Toyota

- Toyota Belta – India/Middle East/Africa (Suzuki Ciaz)
- Toyota Glanza – India (Suzuki Baleno)
- Toyota Starlet – Africa (Suzuki Baleno)
- Toyota Rumion – South Africa/India (Suzuki Ertiga)
- Toyota Urban Cruiser – India/Africa (Suzuki Vitara Brezza)
- Toyota Urban Cruiser Hyryder – India/Africa (Suzuki Grand Vitara)
- Toyota Urban Cruiser Taisor - India (Suzuki Fronx)
- Toyota Starlet Cross – Africa (Suzuki Fronx)
- Toyota Urban Cruiser BEV / Ebella – India/Europe (Suzuki e Vitara)
- Toyota Vitz - Africa (Suzuki Celerio)

Volkswagen

- Volkswagen city car (Suzuki Alto/A-Star)
- Volkswagen Rocktan (Suzuki SX4)
- – both development suspended or cancelled due to the dispute between the companies.

=== Recipient ===
General Motors

- Suzuki Forenza – United States (Daewoo Lacetti sedan/wagon)
- Suzuki Fun – Argentina (Chevrolet Celta)
- Suzuki Reno – United States (Daewoo Lacetti hatchback)
- Suzuki Swift – United States/Canada (Geo/Chevrolet Metro)
- Suzuki Swift+ – Canada (Chevrolet Aveo)
- Suzuki Verona – United States (Daewoo Magnus)

Mazda

- Suzuki Cara – Japan (Autozam AZ-1)

Nissan

- Suzuki Equator – United States (Nissan Frontier)
- Suzuki Landy – Japan (Toyota Noah (R90), formerly Nissan Serena)

Toyota

- Suzuki Across – Europe (Toyota RAV4)
- Suzuki e Every – Japan (Daihatsu eHijet)
- Suzuki Invicto – India (Toyota Innova HyCross)
- Suzuki Landy – Japan (Toyota Noah)
- Suzuki Swace – Europe (Toyota Corolla Touring Sports)

== Concept vehicles ==
Image	Name	Year	Notes
	Suzuki Go	1972	
	Suzuki CV-1	1981	
	Suzuki EE-10	1993	
	Suzuki UT-1	1995	
	Suzuki UR-1	1995	entered production as the Suzuki Kei
	Suzuki CT-1	1997	
	Suzuki UW-1	1997	
	Suzuki Pu-3 Commuter	1999	Pre- production version of the Suzuki Twin
	Suzuki Grand Vitara Pick-up	2001	Pick-up version of the Suzuki Grand Vitara
	Suzuki GSX-R/4	2001	
	Suzuki Covie	2001	
	Suzuki Concept S	2002	entered production aa the first-generation Swift
	Suzuki Concept S2	2003	Convertible version of the Swift
	Suzuki S-RIDE	2003	
	Suzuki LANDBREEZE	2003	
	Suzuki Mobile Terrace	2003	
	Suzuki Wagon R FCV	2003	Fuel cell version of the Wagon R
	Suzuki LC	2005	the LC10 Fronte 360 style was adopted by the Suzuki Alto Lapin LC
	Suzuki IONIS	2005	
	Suzuki Mom's Personal Wagon	2005	Pre-production version of the second generation MR Wagon
	Suzuki Dune Grand Vitara	2005	
	Suzuki concept-X2	2005	entered production as the third generation Vitara
	Suzuki P.X	2005	
	Suzuki Splash	2006	entered production in 2008 under the same name
	Suzuki A-star	2007	entered production in 2009 as the A-Star
	Suzuki Kizashi Concept 1	2007	
	Suzuki Makai	2007	convertible version from the Suzuki SX4
	Suzuki Kizashi Concept 2	2007	
	Suzuki X-Head	2007	
	Suzuki SSC & Pixy	2007	
	Suzuki Kizashi Concept 3	2008	entered production in 2009 as the Kizashi
	Suzuki SX4-FCV	2009	Fuel cell version of the Suzuki SX4
	Suzuki Lapin Convertible	2009	Convertible version did not produced
	Suzuki G70/Regina	2011	Also known as the G70.
	Suzuki Swift S-Concept	2011	entered production as the Swift Sport
	Suzuki Q-Concept	2011	
	Suzuki S-Cross Concept	2012	entered production in 2013
	Suzuki Crosshiker	2013	
	Suzuki iV-4	2013	entered production as the fourth generation Vitara
	Suzuki Hustler Coupe	2013	Entered production in the same year. The Coupe version did not produced
	Suzuki X-Lander	2013	
	Suzuki iM-4	2015	entered production as the second generation Ignis in 2016
	Suzuki iK-2	2015	entered production as the Baleno in the same year
	Suzuki AirTriser	2015	
	Suzuki Mighty Deck	2015	a concept car that resembles the Suzuki Mighty Boy
	Suzuki e-SURVIVOR	2017	
	Suzuki Future S	2018	
	Suzuki Waku Spo	2018	
	Suzuki Hanare	2019	
	Suzuki Hustler Concept	2019	entered production as the second generation Hustler
	Suzuki Ertiga concept	2019	
	Suzuki FUTURO-e	2020	
	Suzuki-Misano	2021	
	Suzuki Vision Grand Turismo	2022	
	Suzuki eWX	2023	
	Suzuki eVX	2023	Entered production as the e Vitara
	Suzuki e-Every	2023	Rebadged version of the e-Hijet
	Suzuki Vision e-Sky	2025	Entered production as the e Sky

== See also ==
- List of Suzuki engines
- List of Suzuki motorcycles
