= Taschen (disambiguation) =

Taschen is an art book publisher from Cologne, Germany

Taschen may also refer to:

- Angelika Taschen (born 1959), German dancer, art historian and publisher
- Benedikt Taschen (born 1961), German art book publisher
- Marlene Taschen (born 1985), daughter of Benedikt Taschen
