= George Lucas bibliography =

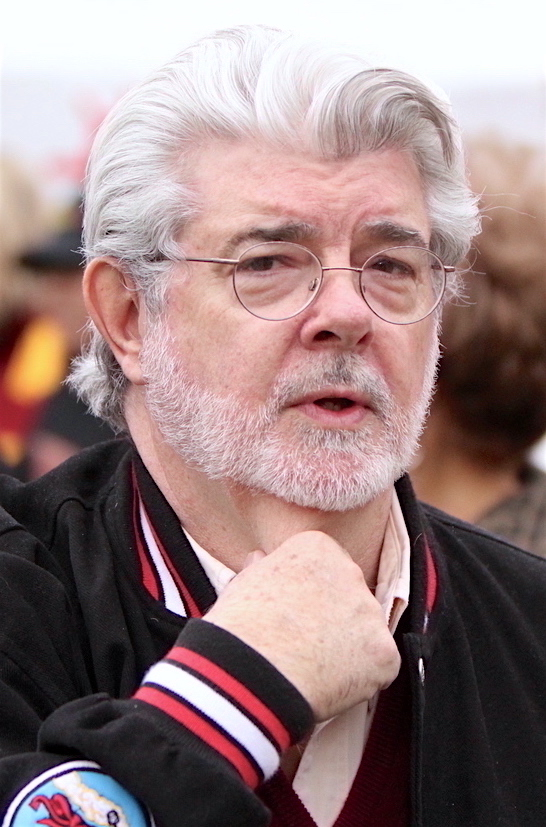
Lucas in 2011

A list of books and essays about George Lucas:

== About George Lucas ==
- Baxter, John (1999). Mythmaker: The Life and Work of George Lucas. HarperCollins. ISBN 978-0-380-97833-5.
- Hearn, Marcus (2005). The Cinema of George Lucas. H.N. Abrams. ISBN 978-0-8109-4968-3.
- Jones, Brian Jay (2016). George Lucas: A Life. Little, Brown and Company. ISBN 978-0-316-25742-8.
- Kline, Sally, ed. (1999). George Lucas: Interviews. University Press of Mississippi. ISBN 978-1-57806-125-9.
- Norwich, Grace (2013). I Am #7: George Lucas. Scholastic Inc. ISBN 978-0-545-53380-5.
- Pollock, Dale (1983). Skywalking: The Life and Films of George Lucas. New York City: Da Capo Press. ISBN 978-0-306-80904-0.
- Rubin, Michael (2006). Droidmaker: George Lucas And the Digital Revolution. Triad Publishing Company. ISBN 978-0-937404-67-6.
- White, Dana (2000). George Lucas. Twenty-First Century Books. ISBN 978-0-8225-4975-8.

== About Star Wars series ==
- Bouzereau, Laurent; Duncan, Jody (1999). Star Wars: The Making of Episode I, The Phantom Menace. Ballantine. ISBN 978-0-345-43111-0.
- Decker, Kevin S.; Eberl, Jason T.; Irwin, William (2013). Star Wars and Philosophy: More Powerful than You Can Possibly Imagine. Open Court. ISBN 978-0-8126-9701-8.
- Duncan, Jody (2002). Mythmaking: Behind the Scenes of Attack of the Clones. Ballantine. ISBN 978-0-345-43128-8.
- Duncan, Paul (2018). The Star Wars Archives: Episodes IV-VI, 1977–1983. Taschen. ISBN 978-3-836-56340-6.
- Duncan, Paul (2020). The Star Wars Archives: Episodes I-III, 1999–2005. Taschen. ISBN 978-3-836-56344-4.
- Reagin, Nancy; Liedl, Janice (2012). Star Wars and History. John Wiley & Sons. ISBN 978-1-118-28525-1.
- Rinzler, J. W. (2005). The Making of Star Wars: Episode III – Revenge of the Sith. Del Rey Books. ISBN 978-0-345-43139-4.
- Rinzler, J. W. (2008). The Making of Star Wars: The Definitive Story Behind the Original Film. Ebury Press. ISBN 978-0-09-192499-7.
- Rinzler, J. W. (2010). The Making of The Empire Strikes Back. Del Rey Books. ISBN 978-0-345-50961-1.
- Rinzler, J. W. (2013). The Making of Return of the Jedi: The Definitive Story Behind the Film. Aurum. ISBN 978-1-78131-076-2.
- Taylor, Chris (2014). How Star Wars Conquered the Universe: The Past, Present, and Future of a Multibillion Dollar Franchise. Basic Books. ISBN 978-0-465-08998-7.
