= 100 Contemporary Artists A-Z =

Visual art book

- Editor: Hans Werner Holzwarth
- Language: English, French, German
- Subject: Contemporary art
- Genre: Visual art
- Publisher: TASCHEN
- Publication date: October 1, 2009
- Publication place: Germany
- Media type: Print (hardcover)
- Pages: 704
- ISBN: 978-3836514903
- OCLC: 748978420
- Dewey Decimal: 709.0511

100 Contemporary Artists A-Z (ISBN 978-3836514903) is a two-volume edition contemporary art compendium. It is the 25th anniversary special edition and it features one hundred contemporary artists from TASCHEN's seminal Art Now! 4 and Art at the Turn of the Millennium series. The biographies are available in English, French and German. The compilation was edited by Hans Werner Holzwarth.

== Contents ==
The artists are covered in two volumes, forty-nine in 100 Contemporary Artists A-K and fifty-one in 100 Contemporary Artists L-Z. On the front cover of the first volume is a representation of Peter Doig's Figures in Red Boat (2005–07) and on the back cover Olafur Eliasson's The Weather Project (2003) is represented. The second volume’s front cover shows Wolfgang Tillmans' Freischwimmer 20 (2003) while the back cover highlights Kara Walker's For the Benefit of All the Races of Mankind (2002).

== Reception ==
A review by ABC News described 100 Contemporary Artists A-Z as "... a comprehensive study of contemporary art at the beginning of the 21st century. At 704 pages, it's nearly 12 pounds of art for your viewing pleasure".

The painter Chris Huen Sin Kan credits the book with inspiring him to pursue art.

== Artists ==
There are one hundred contemporary artists featured in 100 Contemporary Artists A-Z. In the first of the two-volume edition, 100 Contemporary Artists A-K there are forty-nine artists and fifty-one in the second volume, 100 Contemporary Artists L-Z. On the front cover of the first volume is a representation of Peter Doig's Figures in Red Boat (2005-07) and on the back cover Olafur Eliasson's The Weather Project (2003) is represented. The second volume features on the front cover Wolfgang Tillmans' Freischwimmer 20 (2003) while the back cover highlights Kara Walker's For the Benefit of All the Races of Mankind (2002).

Volume	Name	Born	Died	Nationality	Best known for
1	Ai Weiwei	1957		Chinese	Sculpture
2	Albert Oehlen	1954		German	Painting
1	André Butzer	1973		German	Painting
1	Andreas Gursky	1955		German	Photography
1	Anish Kapoor	1954		British	Sculpture
1	Banksy	Anonymous			Graffiti
1	Barbara Kruger	1945		American	Collage
2	Beatriz Milhazes	1960		Brazilian	Painting
1	Cai Guo-Qiang	1957		Chinese	Drawing
1	Cecily Brown	1969		British	Painting
2	Charles Ray	1953		American	Sculpture
2	Chris Ofili	1968		British	Painting
2	Christopher Wool	1955		American	Painting
2	Cindy Sherman	1954		American	Photography
1	Cosima von Bonin	1962		German	Sculpture
1	Damien Hirst	1965		British	Conceptual art
2	Daniel Richter	1962		German	Painting
1	Darren Almond	1971		British	Installation art
1	Doug Aitken	1968		American	Photography
1	Douglas Gordon	1966		British	Video art
2	Elizabeth Peyton	1965		American	Painting
1	Ellen Gallagher	1965		American	Painting
1	Michael Elmgreen & Ingar Dragset	1961 1969		Danish Norwegian	Sculpture
2	Ernesto Neto	1964		Brazilian	Installation art
2	Erwin Wurm	1954		Austrian	Sculpture
1	Félix González-Torres	1957	1996	American	Installation art
2	Francesco Vezzoli	1971		Italian	Film
1	Francis Alÿs	1959		Belgian	Performance art
1	Franz Ackermann	1963		German	Painting
2	Franz West	1947	2012	Austrian	Sculpture
2	Gabriel Orozco	1962		Mexican	Sculpture
1	Gary Hume	1962		British	Painting
1	George Condo	1957		American	Painting
1	Glenn Brown	1966		British	Painting
1	Günther Förg	1952	2013	German	Painting
2	Jason Rhoades	1965	2006	American	Installation art
1	Jean-Michel Basquiat	1960	1988	American	Painting
1	Jeff Koons	1955		American	Installation art
2	Jeff Wall	1946		Canadian	Photography
1	John Currin	1962		American	Painting
2	Jonathan Meese	1970		German	Painting
2	Jorge Pardo	1963		Cuban-American	Sculpture
2	Kara Walker	1969		African-American	Painting
2	Kehinde Wiley	1977		American	Painting
1	Keith Haring	1958	1990	American	Graffiti
2	Luc Tuymans	1958		Belgian	Painter
2	Marepe	1970		Brazilian	Sculpture
2	Mariko Mori	1967		Japanese	Photography
1	Mark Grotjahn	1968		American	Painting
1	Marlene Dumas	1953		South African	Painting
1	Martin Kippenberger	1953	1997	German	Sculpture
1	Matthew Barney	1967		American	Sculpture
1	Maurizio Cattelan	1960		Italian	Sculpture
2	Mickalene Thomas	1971		American	Painting
1	Mike Kelley	1954	2012	American	Sculpture
1	Mona Hatoum	1952		Palestinian	Installation art
1	Monica Bonvicini	1965		Italian	Installation art
1	Nan Goldin	1953		American	Photography
1	Nathalie Djurberg	1978		Swedish	Video art
2	Neo Rauch	1960		German	Painting
1	Olafur Eliasson	1967		Icelandic-Danish	Sculpture
2	Paul McCarthy	1945		American	Sculpture
1	Peter Doig	1959		Scottish	Painting
1	Peter Fischli & David Weiss	1952 1946	2012	Swiss	Sculpture
2	Philip Taaffe	1955		American	Painting
2	Piotr Uklanski	1968		Polish-American	Installation art
2	Pipilotti Rist	1962		Swiss	Video art
2	Rachel Whiteread	1963		British	Sculpture
2	Raqib Shaw	1974		Indian	Painting
2	Raymond Pettibon	1967		American	Drawing
2	Rebecca Warren	1965		British	Sculpture
2	Richard Phillips	1962		American	Painting
2	Richard Prince	1969		American	Painting
1	Rineke Dijkstra	1959		Dutch	Photography
2	Rirkrit Tiravanija	1961		Thai	Installation art
1	Robert Gober	1954		American	Sculptor
2	Rosemarie Trockel	1952		German	Collage
2	Rudolf Stingel	1956		Italian	Painting
2	Santiago Sierra	1966		Spanish	Installation art
2	Sarah Lucas	1962		British	Photography
2	Sarah Morris	1967		American	Painting
2	Shirin Neshat	1957		Iranian	Installation art
1	Subodh Gupta	1964		Indian	Sculpture
2	Takashi Murakami	1962		Japanese	Painting
1	Terence Koh	1977		Canadian	Sculpture
1	Thomas Demand	1964		German	Sculpture
1	Thomas Hirschhorn	1957		Swiss	Installation art
2	Thomas Struth	1954		German	Photography
2	Tim Noble & Sue Webster	1966 1967		British	Installation art
2	Tobias Rehberger	1966		German	Sculptor
1	Tom Friedman	1965		American	Sculpture
2	Tony Oursler	1957		American	Installation art
1	Tracey Emin	1963		British	Installation art
1	Urs Fischer	1973		Swiss	Photography
2	Vera Lutter	1960		German	Photography
1	Walton Ford	1960		American	Watercolor painting
2	Wangechi Mutu	1972		Kenyan	Collage
2	Wolfgang Tillmans	1968		German	Photography
2	Won Ju Lim	1968		Korean-American	Installation art
2	Yoshitomo Nara	1959		Japanese	Sculpture

== See also ==
- Taschen
- Taschen Basic Architecture
- Taschen Basic Art
