= The Star Wars Archives =

Two books by Paul Duncan

The Star Wars Archives 1977–1983 Episodes IV-VI
- Author: Paul Duncan
- Publisher: Taschen
- Publication date: December 15, 2018
- ISBN: 978-3-8365-6340-6

The Star Wars Archives 1999–2005 Episodes I-III
- Author: Paul Duncan
- Publisher: Taschen
- Publication date: December 13, 2020
- ISBN: 978-3-8365-6344-4

The Star Wars Archives are two hardcover books written by Paul Duncan and published by Taschen.

The Star Wars Archives 1977–1983 Episodes IV-VI weights 13 pounds. It contains 1,232 illustrations.

The Star Wars Archives 1999–2005 Episodes I-III weights 13 pounds like the former. It contains George Lucas's plans for the sequel trilogy.

The books included photographs from the sets of the Star Wars films.

== Reception ==
The Chicago Tribune states: “The Star Wars Archives pulls off the impossible: a fresh look at one of the most picked-off franchises ever.”
