= Charlotte Fiell =

British author and design historian

Charlotte Jane Fiell (born 27 September 1965) is a British writer and design historian who has written about design, architecture and fashion. Many of her books and articles have been co-authored with her husband, Peter Fiell. In 2010, The Independent described her and her husband Peter Fiell, as "Britain's most stylish couple", who had "spent two decades educating the public about good contemporary design".

Her works include 1000 Chairs (1997), Design of the 20th Century (1999), Industrial Design A–Z (2000), Scandinavian Design (2002), The Story of Design (2013), 100 Ideas That Changed Design (2019), Women in Design (2019), and Ultimate Collector Cars (2021). She has curated design exhibitions in the United Kingdom, Italy and China, and lectured worldwide.

== Early life and education ==
Fiell was born in London, before moving to Jersey in the Channel Islands where she grew up. She had a keen interest in design and art from a young age, nurtured by her grandparents Len and Mollie Hunter. The former was a collector of Chinese porcelain, snuff bottles and netsukes as well as Japanese sword furniture, while the latter was an artist, who regularly exhibited in Mallorca where they lived.

Fiell attended St Michael's Preparatory School in Jersey and later Roedean School, where she immersed herself in art, followed by sixth form studies at Branson's Commonwealth College in Sainte-Agathe-des-Monts, Quebec. After an arts foundation course at Heatherley School of Fine Art, she shifted focus from fine art to art history, studying Renaissance art in Florence before earning a BA in the History of Drawing and Printmaking at Camberwell College of Arts. While still an undergraduate, she met her future husband, Peter Fiell in 1988 who shared her love of design. She then completed a postgraduate diploma with distinction at Sotheby's Institute, where her interest in design history deepened. Around this time, she also began collecting Arts and Crafts furniture and metalware, gaining hands-on insight into design.

== Career ==
In 1988, Charlotte and Peter Fiell co-founded a pioneering design gallery in London specializing in high-end mid-century furniture, helping revive interest in postwar design and even bringing classics like Arne Jacobsen's Egg chair back into production. Encouraged by her tutor at Sotheby's, Fiell co-authored Modern Furniture Classics Since 1945 in 1990, which went on to become essential course reading for architecture students in the United States.

After connecting with publisher Benedikt Taschen, Charlotte and her husband Peter Fiell focussed on design authorship, producing books including 1000 Chairs, which was released in 1997. In her time with Taschen, she published or edited 38 books on art, design, and architecture. Fiell was Taschen's editor-in-charge, overseeing works like the 12-volume Domus 1928–2000 series.

In 2007, the couple launched Fiell Publishing, releasing titles like Plastic Dreams and Tools for Living, along with works by other authors. In 2010, their Aesthetic Movement-inspired sitting room was featured in The New York Times.

Fiell Publishing merged with Carlton Publishing in 2012, forming Goodman Fiell. She then released The Story of Design in 2013. The book was praised by Museum of Modern Art's curator, Paola Antonelli and was included in James Dyson's top 10 favourite books list. Fiell continued publishing acclaimed works in the late 2010s and 2020s, including Women in Design with daughter Clementine—highlighted by the BBC and Library Journal. This was followed by 100 Ideas That Changed Design, which challenged conventional design thinking.

Most recently, Fiell has published an Ultimate Collector series, beginning with the 2021 book Ultimate Collector Cars. The book received global recognition and press coverage, and was followed by volumes on motorcycles (2023) and watches (2025). Fiell is a long time trustee of the Guild of Handicraft Trust and its related Court Barn, Museum of Craft and Design. Since 2018, Fiell has also been pursuing a PhD on Charles Paget Wade, exploring neurodivergence and collecting, in collaboration with the University of Reading, which was co-supervised by The National Trust (2018–2025).

== Personal life ==
Fiell lives in Chipping Campden, Gloucestershire, with her husband and co-author Peter Fiell. They have two children.

== Selected publications ==
- Modern Furniture Classics since 1945 (London: Thames & Hudson, 1991)
- Modern Chairs (Cologne: Taschen, 1993)
- Charles Rennie Mackintosh (Cologne: Taschen, 1995)
- 1000 Chairs (Cologne: Taschen, 1997)
- Design of the 20th Century (Cologne: Taschen, 1999)
- William Morris (Cologne: Taschen, 1999)
- Industrial Design A-Z (Cologne: Taschen, 2000)
- Decorative Arts – 6 volumes (Cologne: Taschen, 2000)
- Designing the 21st Century (Cologne: Taschen, 2001)
- Scandinavian Design (Cologne: Taschen, 2002)
- Graphic Design for the 21st Century (Cologne: Taschen, 2003)
- 1000 Lights (2 Volumes - Cologne: Taschen, 2005)
- Design Handbook: Concepts, Materials, Styles (Cologne: Taschen, 2006)
- Domus 1928–2000 (12 volumes – Cologne: Taschen, 2006)
- Design Handbook: Concepts, Materials, Styles (Cologne: Taschen, 2006)
- Contemporary Graphic Design (Cologne: Taschen, 2007)
- Design Now! (Cologne: Taschen, 2007)
- Plastic Dreams, Synthetic Visions in Design (London: Fiell Publishing, 2010)
- Tools for Living: A Sourcebook of Iconic Designs for the Home (London: Fiell Publishing, 2010)
- Hairstyles: Ancient to Present (London: Fiell Publishing, 2012)
- Fashion Sourcebook – 1920s (London: Fiell Publishing, 2012)
- 1930s Fashion, The Definitive Sourcebook (London: Goodman Fiell, 2012)
- Chairs: 1000 Masterpieces of Modern Design, 1800 to the Present Day (London: Goodman Fiell, 2012)
- Masterpieces of British Design (London: Goodman Fiell, 2012)
- Memories of a Lost World: Travels through the Magic Lantern (London: Fiell Publishing, 2013)
- 1940s Fashion, The Definitive Sourcebook (London: Goodman Fiell, 2013)
- New Graphic Design, The 100 Best Contemporary Graphic Designers (London: Goodman Fiell, 2013)
- Masterpieces of Italian Design (London: Goodman Fiell, 2013)
- The Story of Design (London: Goodman Fiell, 2013)
- Lightopia (contributor – Weil-am-Rhein, Vitra Design Museum, 2014)
- Fashion of the '70s (London: Goodman Fiell, 2014)
- Robert Welch Design: Craft & Industry (London: Laurence King, 2015)
- Design Museum: A to Z of Design and Designers (London: Goodman Fiell, 2016)
- Samuel Chan: Design Purity + Craft Principles (London: Laurence King, 2016)
- Modern Scandinavian Design, 1925 to present (London: Laurence King, 2017)
- 100 Ideas That Changed Design (London: Laurence King, 2019)
- Women in Design – From Aino Aalto to Eva Zeisel (London: Laurence King, 2019)
- Contemporary Chinese Furniture Design – A New Wave of Creativity (London: Laurence King, 2019)
- Ultimate Collector Cars (double XL volume – Cologne: Taschen, 2021)
- Essensualism – Shang Xia + The Craft Spirit of Chinese Design (London: Laurence King, 2022)
- Ultimate Collector Motorcycles (double XL volume – Cologne: Taschen, 2023)
- Ultimate Collector Watches (double XL volume – Cologne: Taschen, 2025)
