= Suzuki CV1 =

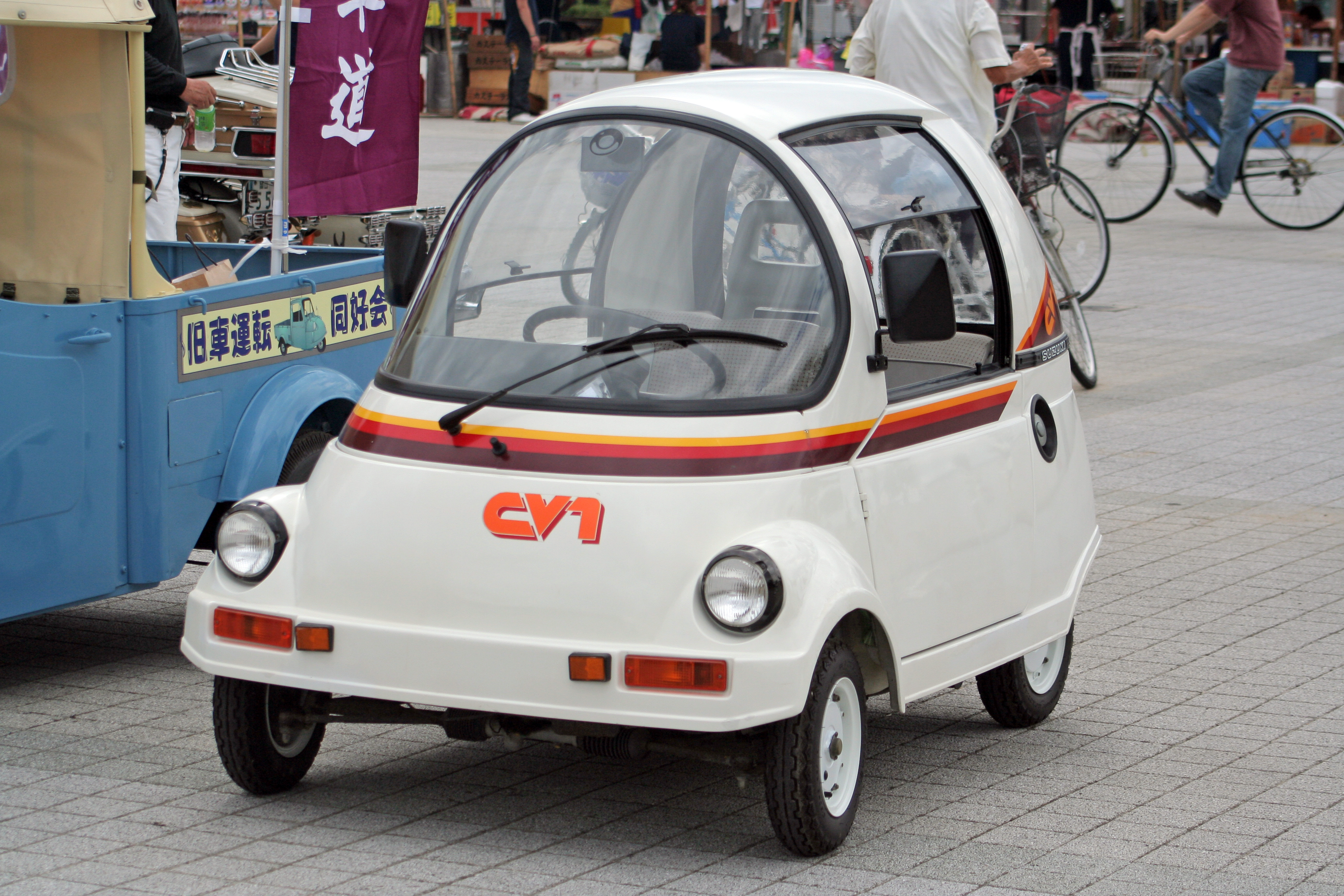
- Suzuki CV1 on display at a festival near Himeji Castle in Hyōgo Prefecture, ^

Overview
- Manufacturer: Suzuki
- Production: 1981-1985

Body and chassis
- Class: Microcar

Powertrain
- Engine: 50 cc (3.1 cu in) 2-stroke Single cylinder

Dimensions
- Wheelbase: 1,310 mm (4 ft 4 in)
- Length: 1,940 mm (6 ft 4 in)
- Width: 1,185 mm (3 ft 10.7 in)
- Height: 1,290 mm (4 ft 3 in)
- Kerb weight: 168 kg (3.31 long cwt)

The Suzuki CV1 is a microcar first presented at the 24th Tokyo Motor Show in 1981.

Displayed under the banner of Suzuki Community Vehicle, the CV1 was a single-seat, four-wheeler, with a narrower track at the rear. It had a single door in its fiberglass body and originally had a claimed maximum speed of 30 km/h (19 mph), the legal limit for a moped in Japan at the time, and a fuel economy of 2.0 L/100 km (140 mpg_{‑imp}; 120 mpg_{‑US}). The vehicle could be driven on a moped licence in Japan and was sold in very limited numbers on a trial basis at a price of 300,000 Yen. Somewhere between 50 and 100 examples were manufactured.

After a governmental review, it was determined that the CV1 could only be driven by someone with a full license, rather than a moped license (which only required a written test). While this allowed Suzuki to increase the top speed to 60 km/h (37 mph), it also removed the reason for the CV1's existence. The car had windows on either side that could be slid upwards and early versions had a single headlamp. Its design was a modernized take on the post-war German bubble cars like the Heinkel Kabine and the BMW Isetta. Production ended in 1985 when Japanese licensing laws were changed.

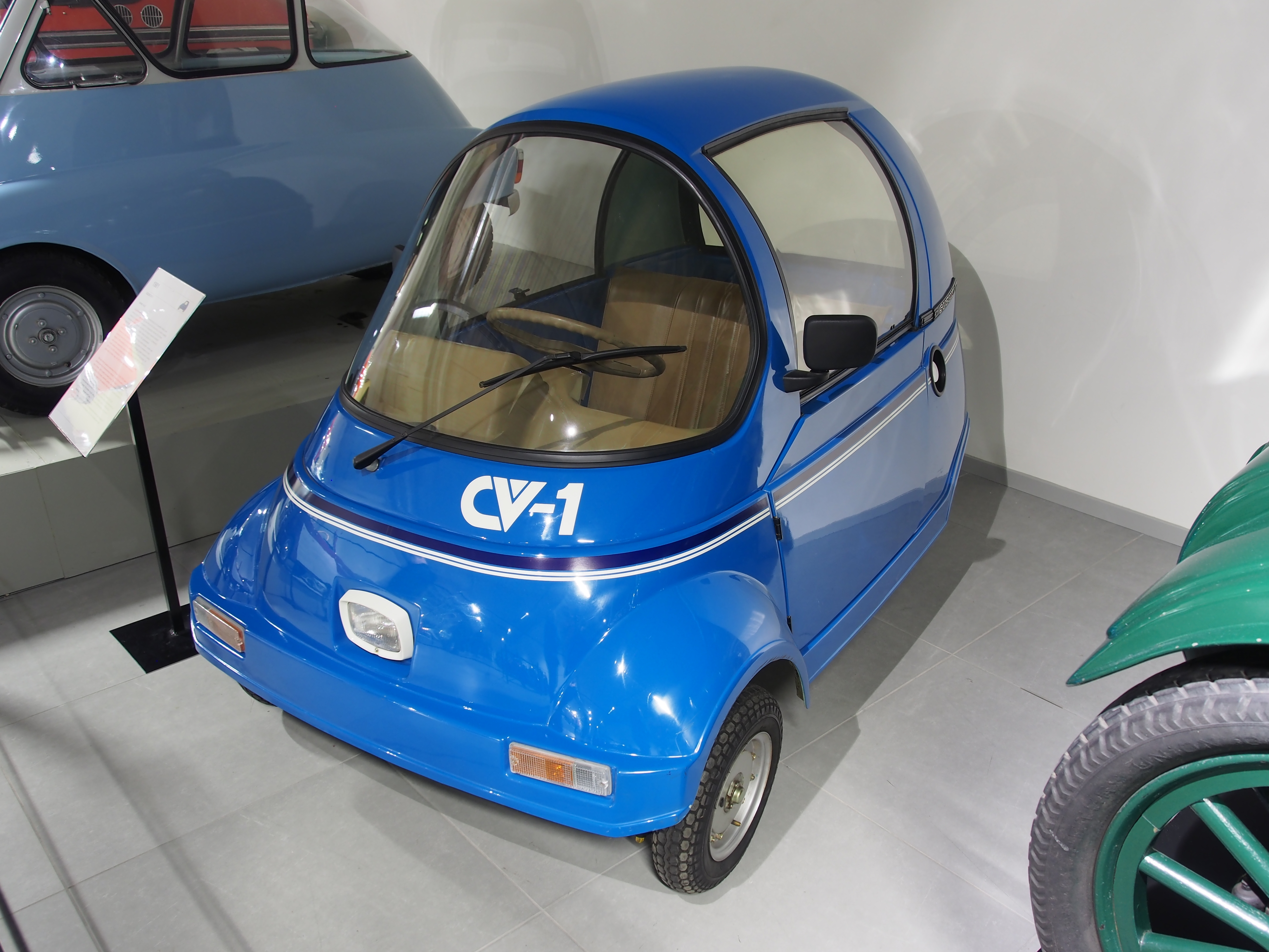
Suzuki CV1 front

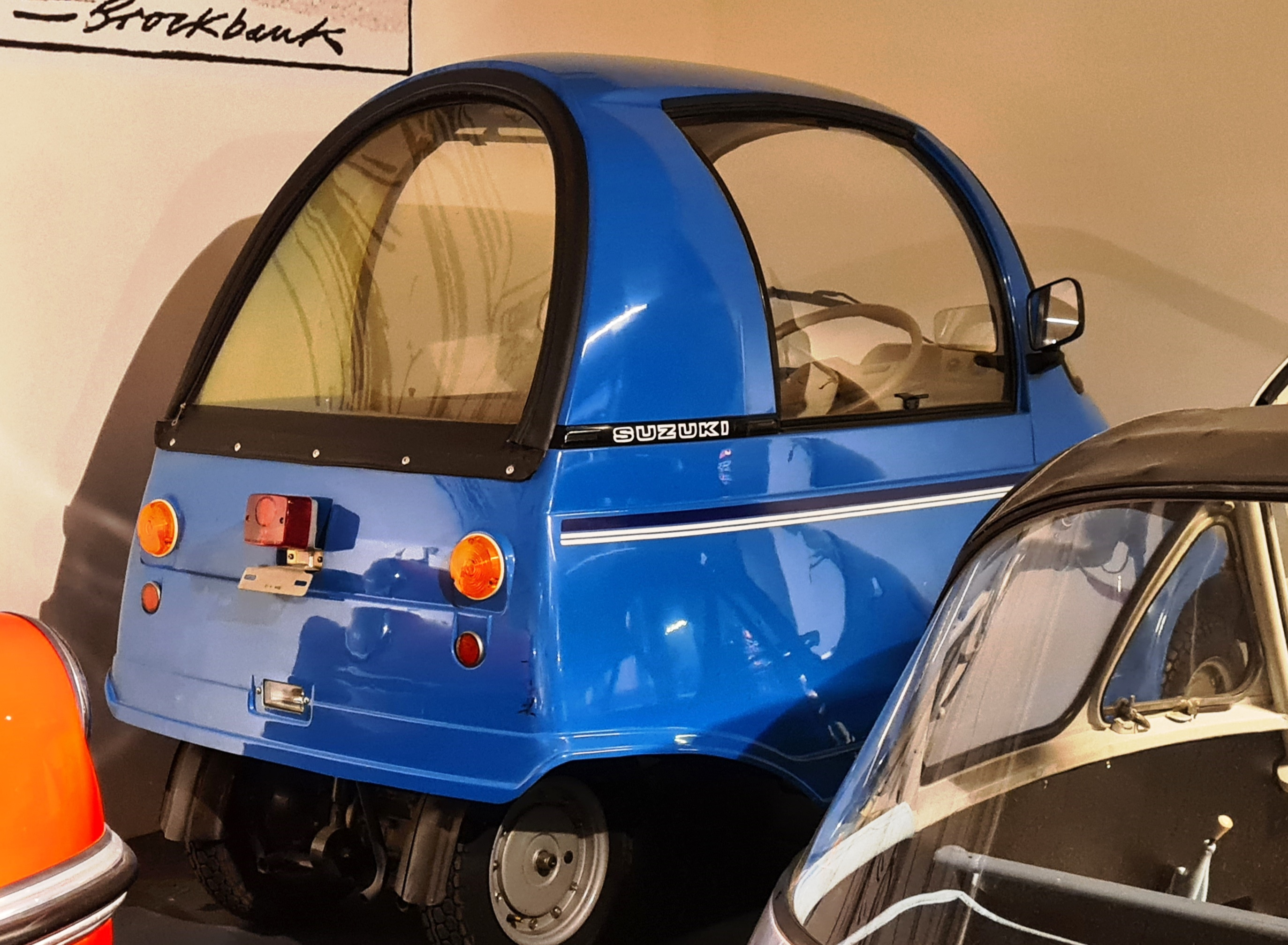
Suzuki CV1 rear

== Sources ==
- Von Mende, Hans-Ulrich; Dietz, Matthias (1994), Kleinwagen, Small Cars, Petites Voitures, Benedikt Taschen, ISBN 9783822889107
