= Taschen Basic Art =

Series of art books

Taschen Basic Art is a series of art collection books, published by Taschen, starting in 1985. Each book looks at a different artist, with a biography, and illustrations of their work. The books are published as hardcover books of 21 x 26 cm. As of 2025, 124 titles had been published. Similar series entitled Taschen Basic Architecture, Taschen Basic Cinema and Taschen Basic Photographies were started after the success of the Basic Art series.

In the spring of 2014, Taschen's Basic Art series received major criticism in Swedish media for its focus on male artists. The series then consisted of 95 books, only five of which were of female artists. The artists Ditte Ejlerskov and EvaMarie Lindahl highlighted the disparity with an art installation at Malmö Konsthall in Sweden.

== Featured artists and topics ==
=== Artists ===
- Alvar Aalto
- Tadao Ando
- Francis Bacon
- Jean-Michel Basquiat
- Hieronymus Bosch
- Fernando Botero
- Sandro Botticelli
- Marcel Breuer
- Pieter Bruegel the Elder
- Santiago Calatrava
- Caravaggio
- Paul Cézanne
- Marc Chagall
- Christo and Jeanne-Claude
- Salvador Dalí
- Giorgio de Chirico
- Tamara de Lempicka
- Edgar Degas
- Marcel Duchamp
- Albrecht Dürer
- Charles and Ray Eames
- James Ensor
- Max Ernst
- M.C. Escher: The Graphic Work
- Lucio Fontana
- Lucian Freud
- Albert Frey
- Caspar David Friedrich
- Antoni Gaudí
- Paul Gauguin
- H. R. Giger
- Francisco de Goya
- El Greco
- Walter Gropius
- Zaha Hadid
- Keith Haring
- Hiroshige
- Hokusai
- Hans Holbein the Younger
- Edward Hopper
- Friedensreich Hundertwasser
- Frida Kahlo
- Louis I. Kahn
- Wassily Kandinsky
- Ernst Ludwig Kirchner
- Paul Klee
- Yves Klein
- Gustav Klimt
- Pierre Koenig
- Jeff Koons
- John Lautner
- Le Corbusier
- Leonardo da Vinci
- Roy Lichtenstein
- Adolf Loos
- August Macke
- Charles Rennie Mackintosh
- René Magritte
- Kazimir Malevich
- Édouard Manet
- Henri Matisse
- Henri Matisse: Cut Outs
- Richard Meier
- Michelangelo
- Mies van der Rohe
- Joan Miró
- Amedeo Modigliani
- Piet Mondrian
- Claude Monet
- William Morris
- Alphonse Mucha
- Edvard Munch
- Richard Neutra
- Oscar Niemeyer
- Georgia O'Keeffe
- Renzo Piano
- Jackson Pollock
- Gio Ponti
- Jean Prouvé
- Raphael
- Odilon Redon
- Rembrandt
- Pierre-Auguste Renoir
- Gerhard Richter
- Diego Rivera
- Norman Rockwell
- Auguste Rodin
- Mark Rothko
- Henri Rousseau
- Peter Paul Rubens
- Eero Saarinen
- Egon Schiele
- Rudolph Michael Schindler
- Titian
- Henri de Toulouse-Lautrec
- J. M. W. Turner
- Jan van Eyck
- Vincent van Gogh
- Diego Velázquez
- Johannes Vermeer
- Andy Warhol
- F. L. Wright

=== Art Movements ===
- 1920s Berlin
- 1920s Paris
- Abstract Art
- Abstract Expressionism
- Bauhaus
- Blaue Reiter
- Die Brücke
- Case Study Houses
- Cubism
- Dadaism
- Egyptian Art
- Expressionism
- Futurism
- Graphic Design 1890–Today
- Impressionism
- Japanese Woodblock Prints
- Pop Art
- Pre-Raphaelites
- Renaissance
- Self-Portraits
- Surrealism
- Vienna 1900
- What Great Paintings Say: Beautiful Nudes
- What Great Paintings Say: Faces of Power
- What Great Paintings Say: Italian Renaissance

== See also ==
- 100 Contemporary Artists A-Z
