= Suzuki Xbee =

Subcompact crossover SUV

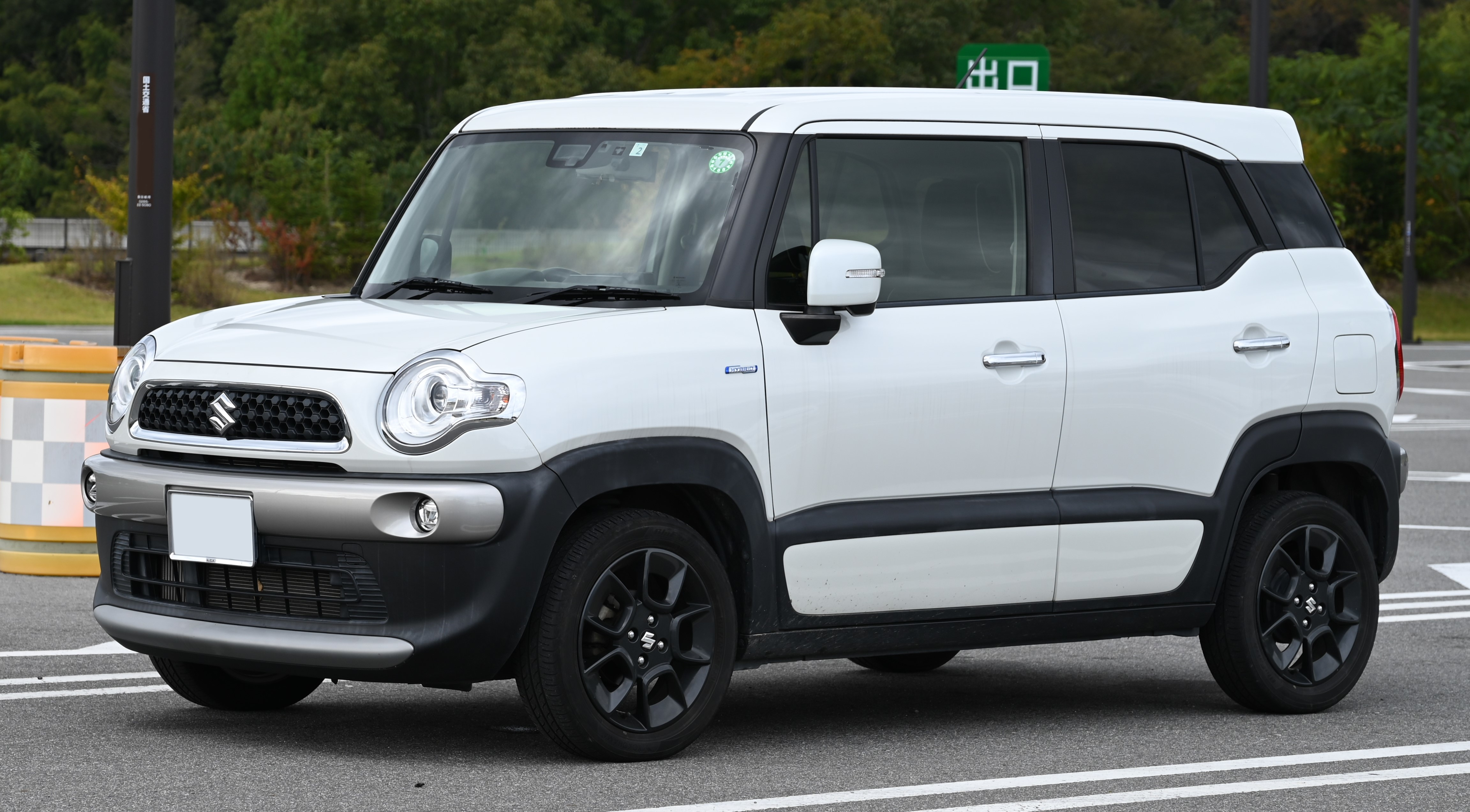
- Suzuki Xbee (MN71S, pre-facelift)

Overview
- Manufacturer: Suzuki
- Model code: MN71S; MND1S
- Production: December 2017 – present
- Assembly: Japan: Makinohara, Shizuoka (Sagara plant)

Body and chassis
- Class: Crossover city car
- Body style: 5-door SUV
- Layout: Front-engine, front-wheel-drive; Front-engine, four-wheel-drive
- Platform: HEARTECT
- Related: Suzuki Ignis; Suzuki Solio

Powertrain
- Engine: Petrol MHEV: 1.0 L K10C turbo I3 (MN71S); 1.2 L Z12E I3 (MND1S)
- Electric motor: DC synchronous: WA05A (MN71S); WA06D (MND1S)
- Power output: 73 kW (98 hp; 99 PS) (1.0 L); 59 kW (79 hp; 80 PS) (1.2 L)
- Transmission: 6-speed automatic (1.0 L); CVT (1.2 L)
- Hybrid drivetrain: 12-volt mild hybrid
- Battery: 3-Ah lithium-ion

Dimensions
- Wheelbase: 2,435 mm (95.9 in)
- Length: 3,760 mm (148.0 in)
- Width: 1,670 mm (65.7 in)
- Height: 1,705 mm (67.1 in)
- Kerb weight: 960–1,030 kg (2,116–2,271 lb)

The Suzuki Xbee (Japanese: スズキ・クロスビー, Hepburn: Suzuki Kurosubī) (pronounced "Crossbee") is a crossover city car produced by Japanese carmaker Suzuki since December 2017, and is sold exclusively in Japan.

== Overview ==
The Xbee made its world premiere at the 2017 Tokyo Motor Show. Although being similar in styling to the Hustler kei car, they do not share the same mechanical parts. Instead, the larger Xbee uses the HEARTECT platform that is shared with the second-generation Ignis and third-generation Solio.

The Xbee is only available with a mild hybrid powertrain coupled to a 6-speed automatic transmission with paddle shifters. The four-wheel drive model is also equipped with hill descent control, which limits the speed to 7 km/h (4 mph) when engaged.

A lightly facelifted model was unveiled on 13 July 2022. This model received redesigned alloy wheels and a front grille with a central, double chrome bar, while the colors were changed and equipment levels changed somewhat. From December 2023, responding to new legal requirements, the Xbee was fitted with a reversing camera.

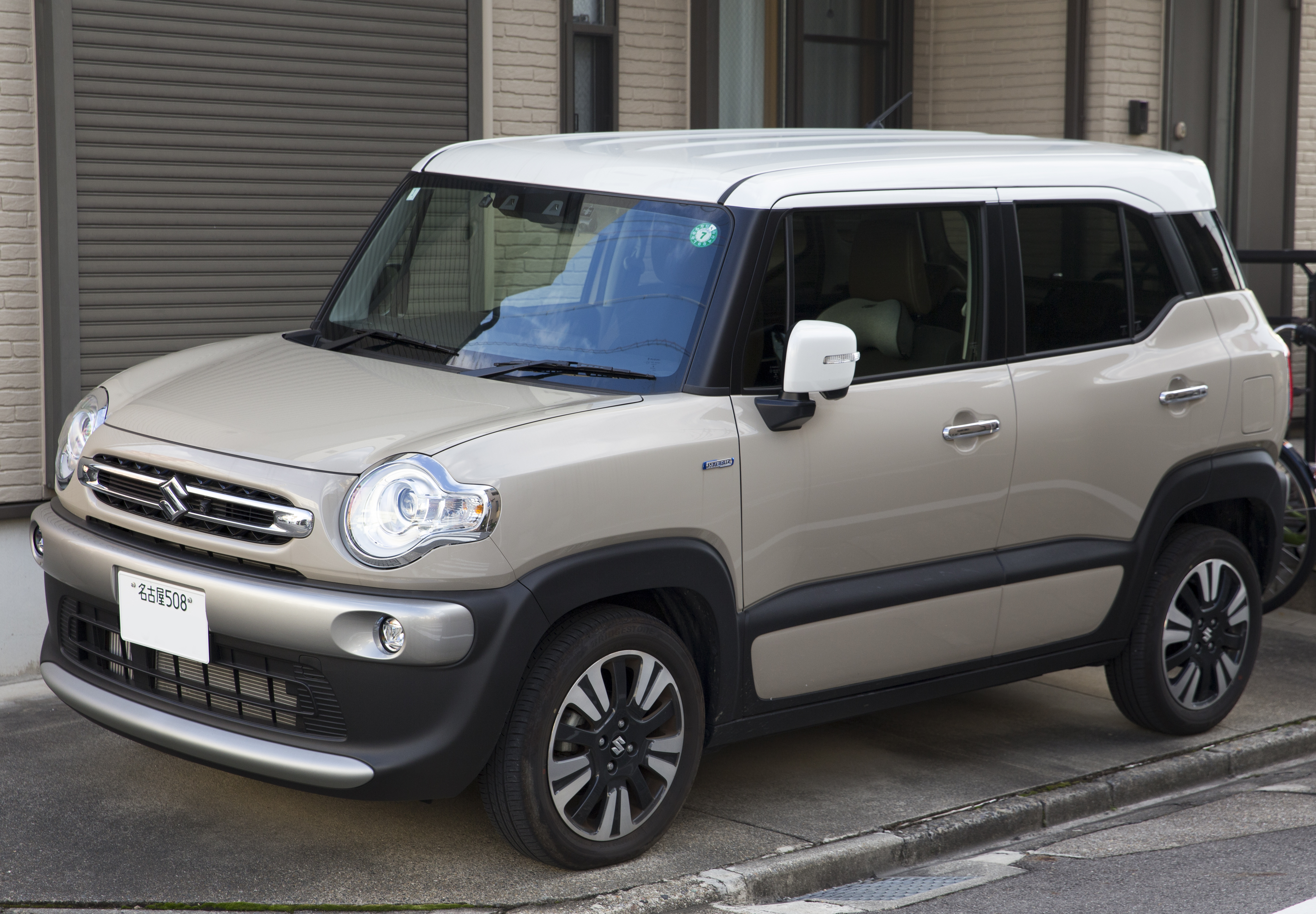
Xbee Hybrid MZ (MN71S, 2022 facelift)

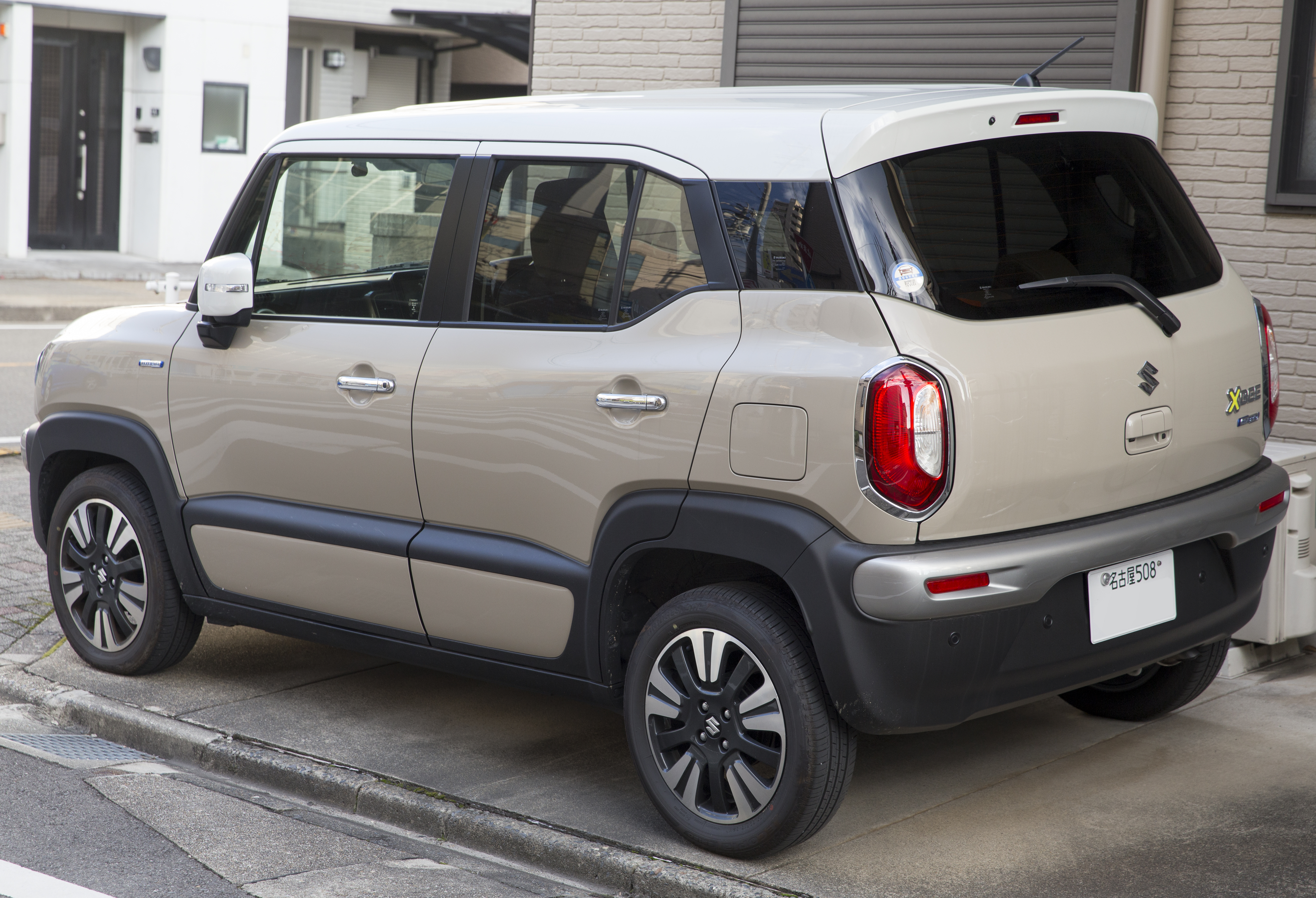
Rear view (MN71S, 2017–2025)

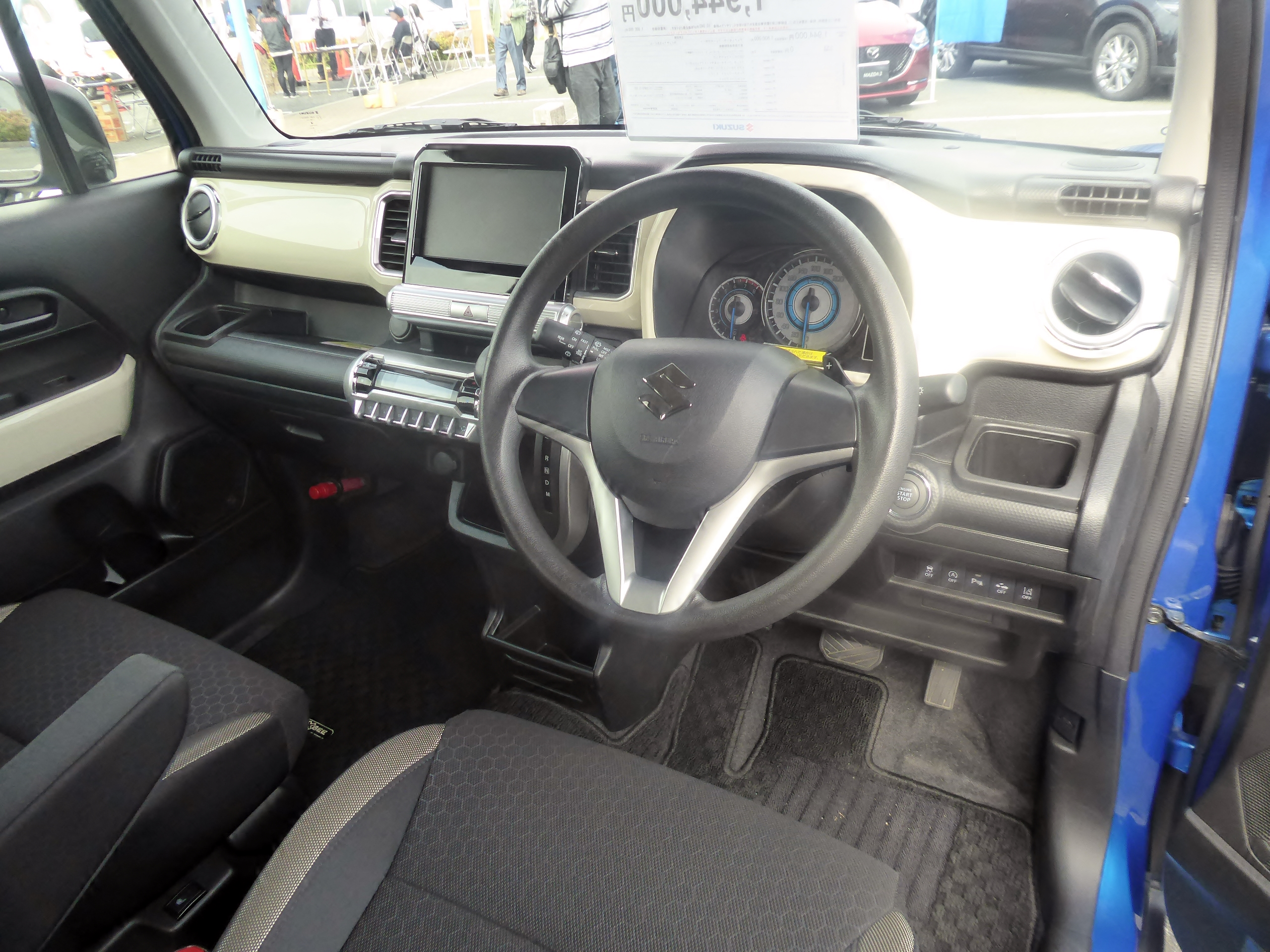
Interior (MN71S, 2017–2025)

=== 2025 facelift ===
The Xbee received a major facelift in October 2025 with a boxier appearance, and LED Headlights. The interior was also refreshed with a new dashboard, steering wheel, 9 inch digital instrument cluster, door panels, instrument cluster, seat upholstery, new X shaped alloy wheels and additional electronic parking brake for the top model. The powertrain was also changed to a naturally aspirated 1.2 L Z12E engine and combined to a CVT, shared with the Swift and Solio. The motor also changed to WA06D replaced the old WA50A. The body colour was added to 13 combinations in total: 9 two-tone colours and 4 one colours, and optional Black Tough 2-tone which unifies the black painted roof, side color panels, and bumper garnish.

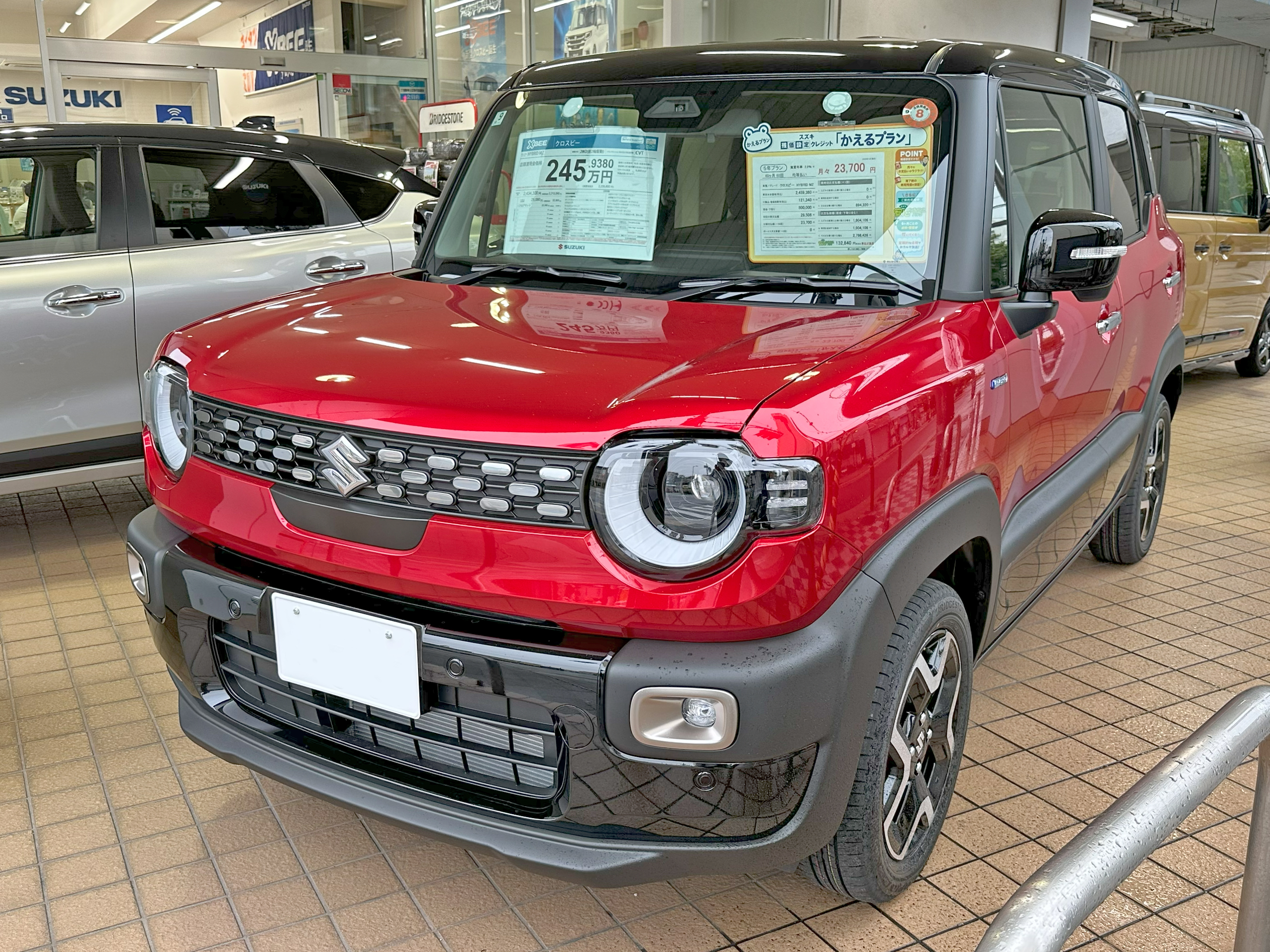
Xbee Hybrid MZ (MND1S, 2025 facelift)

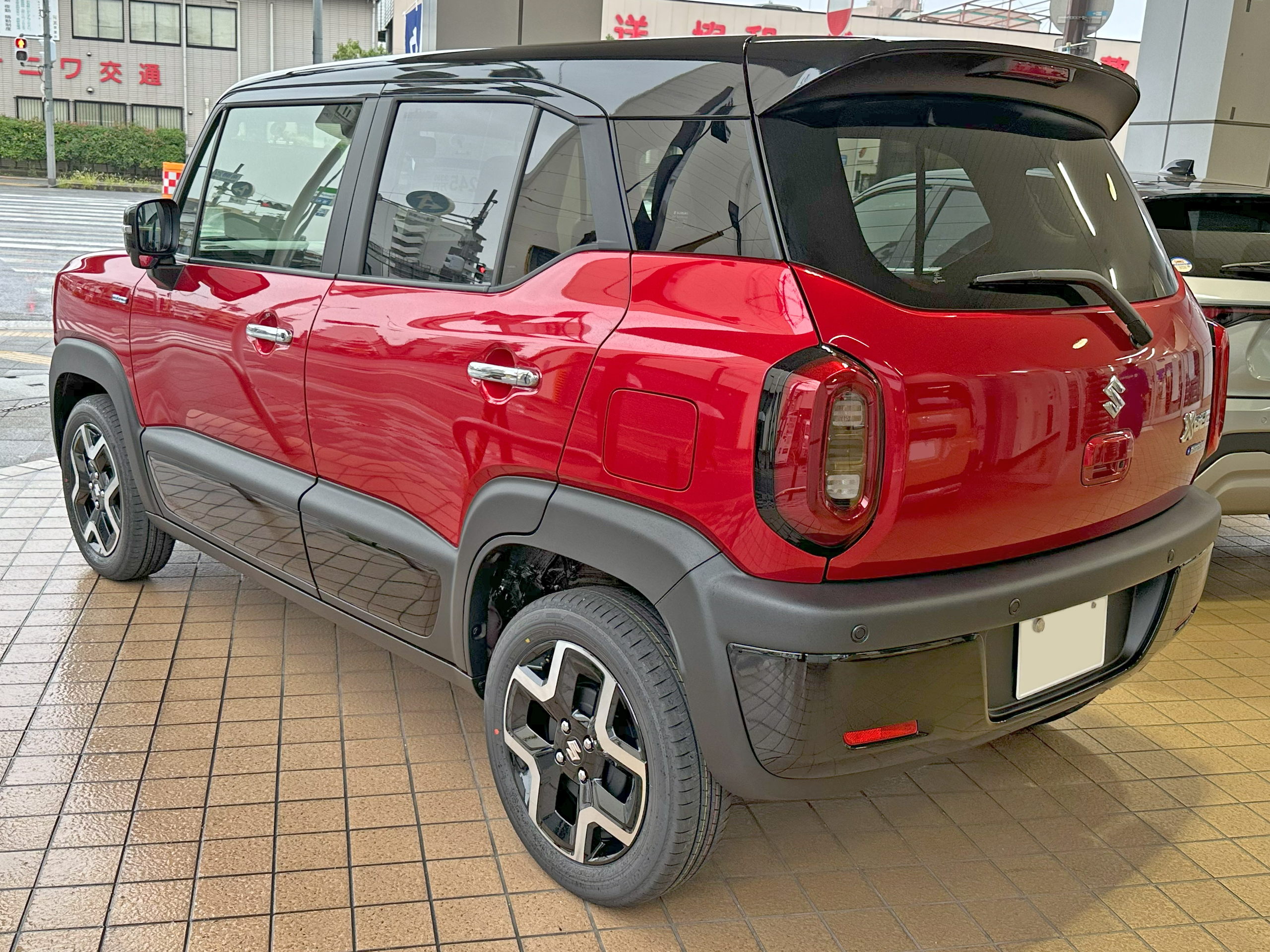
Rear view (MND1S, 2025 facelift)

Interior (MND1S, 2025 facelift)

== Powertrain ==
Model	Engine/motor	Displacement/type	Power	Torque	Transmission	Year
MN71S	K10C turbo I3 + WA05A ISG	1.0 L + 12-volt MHEV	99 PS (73 kW; 98 hp) at 5,500 rpm + 3.1 PS (2.3 kW; 3.1 hp) at 1,000 rpm	150 N⋅m (15.3 kg⋅m; 111 lb⋅ft) at 1,700–4,000 rpm + 50 N⋅m (5 kg⋅m; 37 lb⋅ft) at 100 rpm	6-speed automatic	2017–2025
MND1S	Z12E; I3 + WA06D ISG	1.2 L + 12-volt MHEV	80 PS (59 kW; 79 hp) at 5,700 rpm + 3.1 PS (2.3 kW; 3.1 hp) at 1,100 rpm	108 N⋅m (11.0 kg⋅m; 79.7 lb⋅ft) at 4,500 rpm + 60 N⋅m (6 kg⋅m; 44 lb⋅ft) at 100 rpm	CVT	2025–present

== Sales ==
Year	Japan
2017	1,586
2018	30,624
2019	24,108
2020	15,546
2021	12,401
2022	12,315
2023	13,356
2024	12,592

== See also ==
- List of Suzuki automobiles
