= Suzuki Equator =

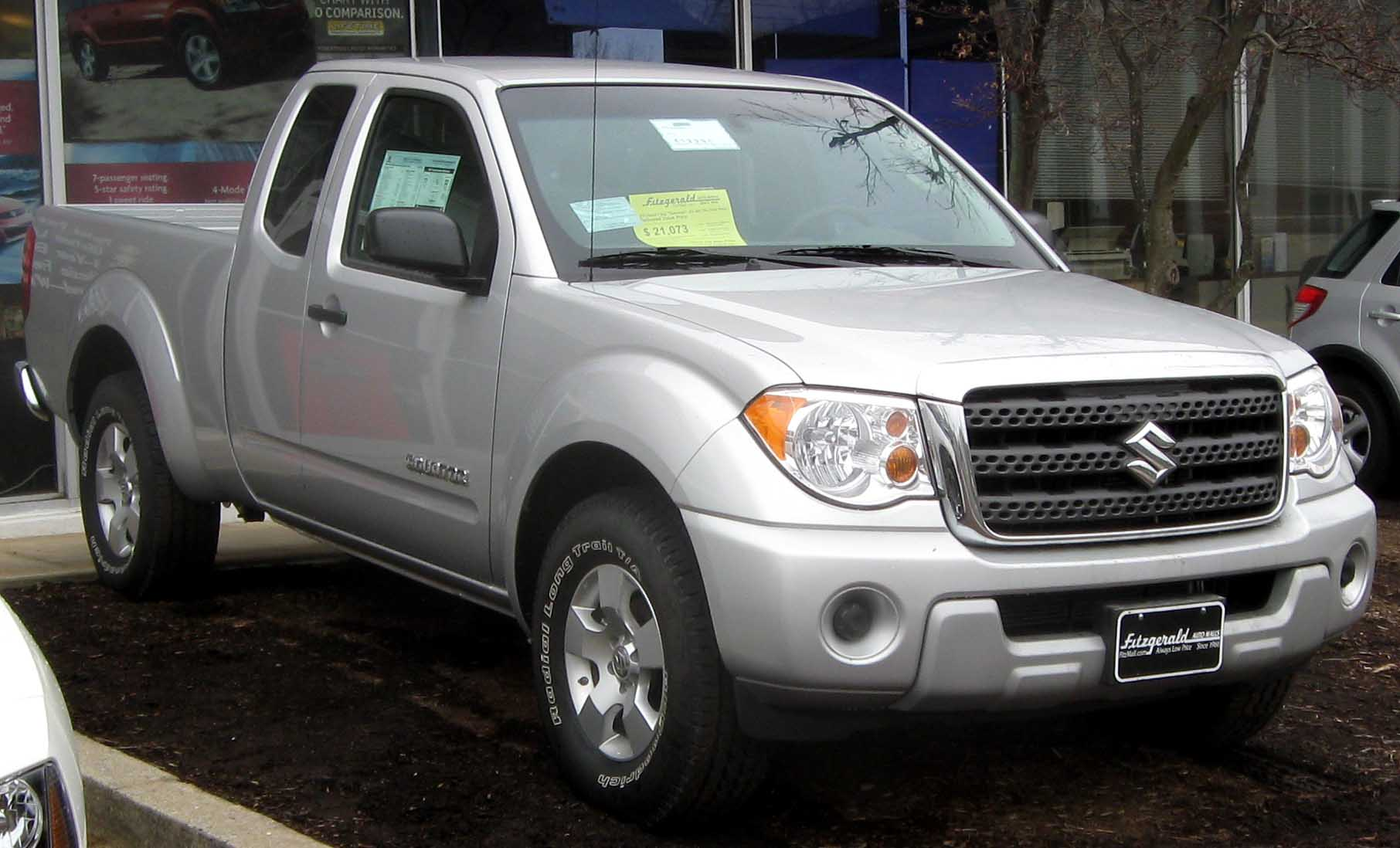

Overview
- Manufacturer: Nissan
- Also called: Nissan Frontier (North America); Nissan Navara
- Production: 2008–2012 (USA); 2008–2010 (Canada)
- Model years: 2009–2012 (USA); 2009–2010 (Canada)
- Assembly: Smyrna, Tennessee, United States

Body and chassis
- Class: Mid-size pickup truck
- Body style: 2-door pickup truck 4-door pickup truck
- Layout: Front-engine, rear-wheel-drive / four-wheel-drive
- Platform: Nissan F-Alpha platform
- Related: Nissan Frontier (D40)

Powertrain
- Engine: 2.5L Nissan QR25DE I4; 4.0L Nissan VQ40DE V6
- Power output: 152 hp (113 kW; 154 PS) (QR25DE); 261 hp (195 kW; 265 PS) (VQ40DE)
- Transmission: 5-speed automatic 5-speed manual

Dimensions
- Wheelbase: 125.9 in (3,198 mm); 139.9 in (3,553 mm) (crew cab/6' bed)
- Length: 206.6 in (5,248 mm); 220.1 in (5,591 mm) (crew cab/6' bed)
- Width: 72.8 in (1,849 mm)
- Height: 68.7 in (1,745 mm); 69.7 in (1,770 mm); 70.1 in (1,781 mm)

The Suzuki Equator is a mid-size pickup truck based on the Nissan Frontier, assembled by Nissan and sold under the Suzuki brand. It was released in the 2009 model year in the United States, it made its debut at the 2008 Chicago Auto Show.

The Equator was offered as either a four-seat Extended Cab or a five-seat Crew Cab. In the Canadian market, the Equator is only offered in the Crew Cab configuration, in a single trim level.

Power on base Extended Cab models comes from a 4-cylinder engine. A V6 is optional on Extended Cab models and standard with the Crew Cab. Both engines are supplied by Nissan.

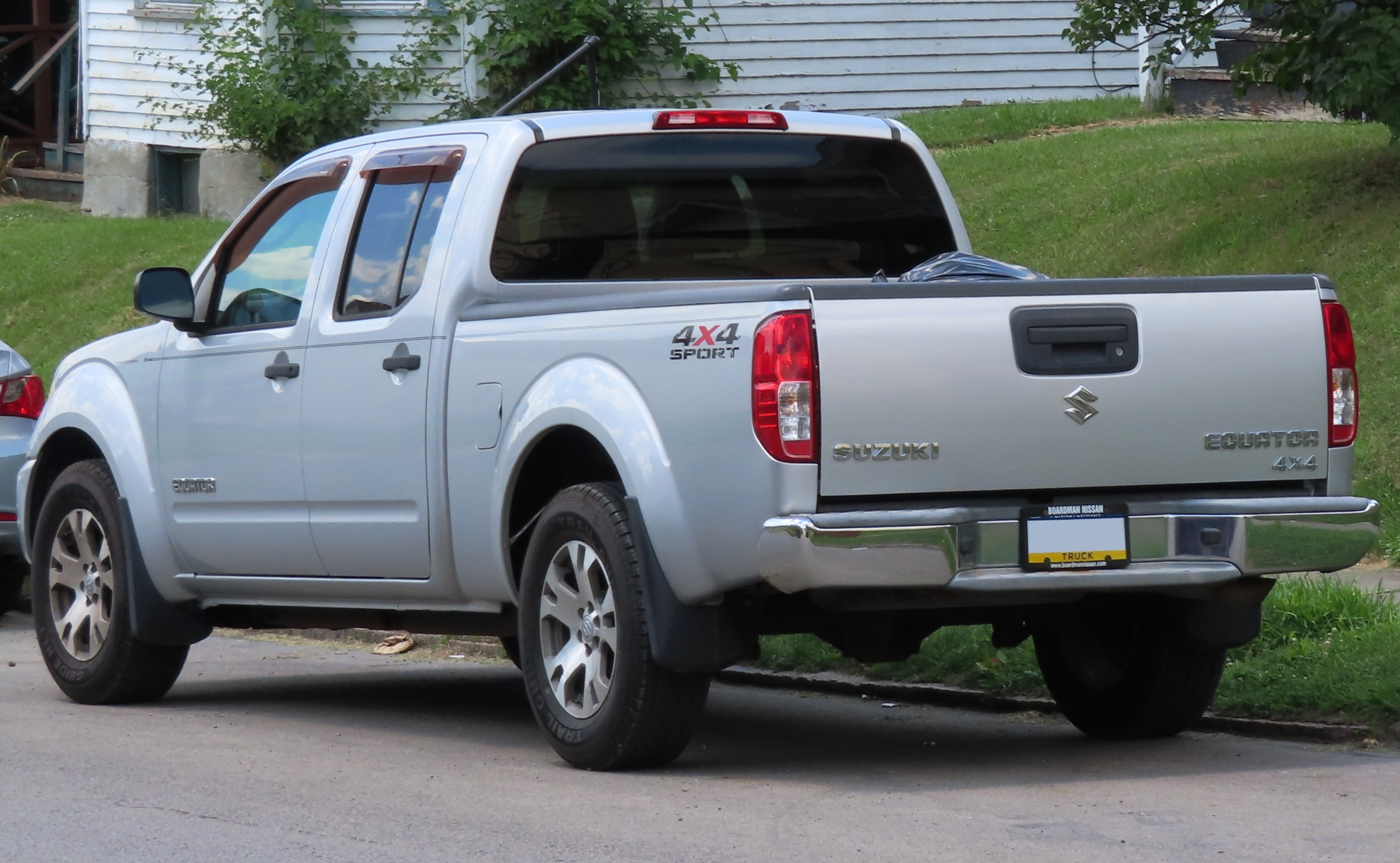
Rear view

The base 2.5 L QR25DE Inline-4 produces 152 hp (113 kW) at 5,200 rpm and 171 lb⋅ft (232 N⋅m) at 4,400 rpm, and is a rear-wheel-drive. It comes with either a five-speed manual transmission or a five-speed automatic.

The 4.0 L VQ40DE V6 engine develops 261 hp (195 kW) at 5,600 rpm and 281 lb⋅ft (381 N⋅m) at 4,000 rpm. It comes standard with a five-speed automatic and is available with four-wheel-drive.

The Equator won Peterson's 4Wheel & Off-Road'S 2009 4x4 of the Year, beating out the Dodge Ram 1500, Ford F150, Hummer H3, Kia Borrego, and Toyota Sequoia. Sales of the Suzuki Equator since 2009 have been 5,808 overall, and it rarely sold over 200 units per month.

The Suzuki Equator was discontinued in 2010 for the Canadian market and 2012 for the United States market.

== See also ==
- Nissan Frontier
