= Suzuki e Sky =

Battery electric kei car

Overview
- Manufacturer: Suzuki
- Model code: KBAAS
- Production: October 2026–present
- Assembly: Japan: Kosai, Shizuoka

Body and chassis
- Class: Kei car (Japan)
- Body style: 5-door hatchback
- Layout: Front-motor, front-wheel-drive
- Platform: HEARTECT-e

Powertrain
- Electric motor: BB8A DC synchronous
- Power output: 47 kW (63 hp; 64 PS)
- Transmission: CVT
- Battery: 26 kWh LFP FinDreams
- Electric range: 310 km (193 mi) (WLTC)
- Plug-in charging: 50 kW DC

Dimensions
- Wheelbase: 2,460 mm (96.9 in)
- Length: 3,395 mm (133.7 in)
- Width: 1,475 mm (58.1 in)
- Height: 1,625 mm (64.0 in)
- Kerb weight: 1,030 kg (2,271 lb)

The Suzuki e Sky (Japanese: スズキ・eスカイ, Hepburn: Suzuki Esukai) (stylised as e SKY) is a battery electric kei car manufactured and sold by Suzuki since 6 October 2026. It was announced on 24 August 2026 and previewed at the 2025 Japan Mobility Show as the Vision e-Sky.

== Overview ==
The Vision e-Sky concept was unveiled in 2025 at the Japan Mobility Show. The production e Sky is boxier compared to the concept vehicle. As the kei car regulations, the car's dimensions are 3,395 mm (133.7 in) long, 1,475 mm (58.1 in) wide, and 1,625 mm (64.0 in) tall, similar to the concept model. The e Sky is equipped with a 26 kWh battery capable of a WLTC range of 310 km (190 mi). This results in shorter charging times.

The headlights are inspired by digital numbers. The interior of the e Sky is equipped with a 10.1-inch floating central control screen and a digital speedometer. The updated Suzuki S emblem was adopted for the first time.

The e Sky was officially released on 6 October 2026, and available in A, G, and X grades. The e Sky received the 2027 RJC Car of the Year award.

Reat view

Interior

== Concept models ==
The e Sky borrows its overall design from the Vision e Sky concept car, which was showcased at the 2025 Japan Mobility Show. The Vision e Sky is one of three electric cars were showcased at the show.

The Vision e Sky features U-shaped headlights, with the incorporation of pixelated lights on the grille. The body size of 1,625 mm (64.0 in) in height and front and rear swing doors, which is similarity to the current generation Wagon R.

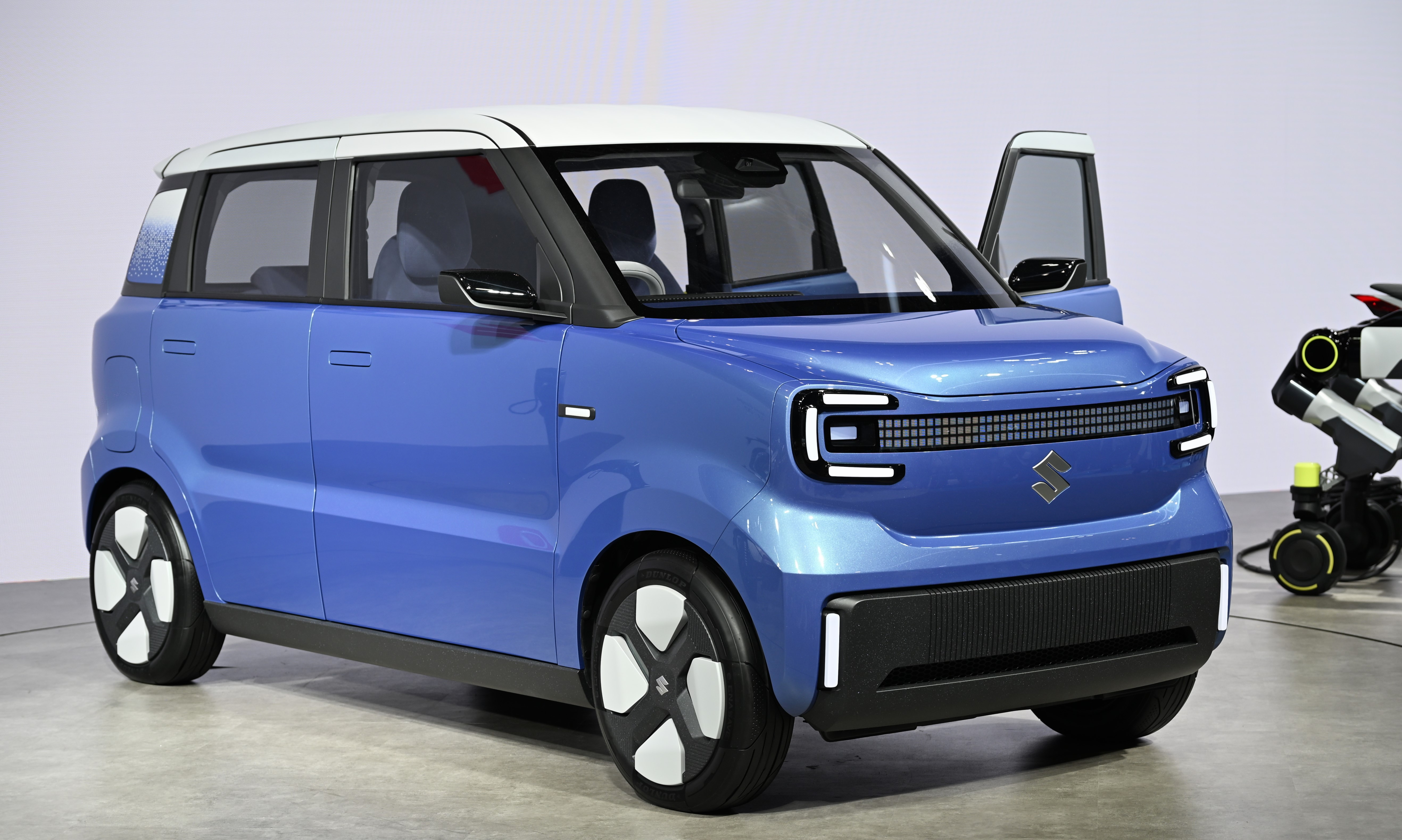
Front view

Rear view

Interior
