= Suzuki Landy =

Automotive nameplate by Suzuki

The Suzuki Landy (Japanese: スズキ・ランディ, Hepburn: Suzuki Randi) is an automobile nameplate used by the Japanese automobile manufacturer Suzuki since 1999 for several minivan models:

- Suzuki Every Landy, a passenger minivan based on the tenth-generation Carry/fourth-generation Every sold between 1999 and 2005
- Changhe Suzuki Landy, a passenger minivan based on the fifth-generation Every sold in China between 2007 and 2012
- Rebadged Nissan Serena for the Japanese market between 2007 and 2022
- Rebadged R90 series Toyota Noah for the Japanese market since 2022.
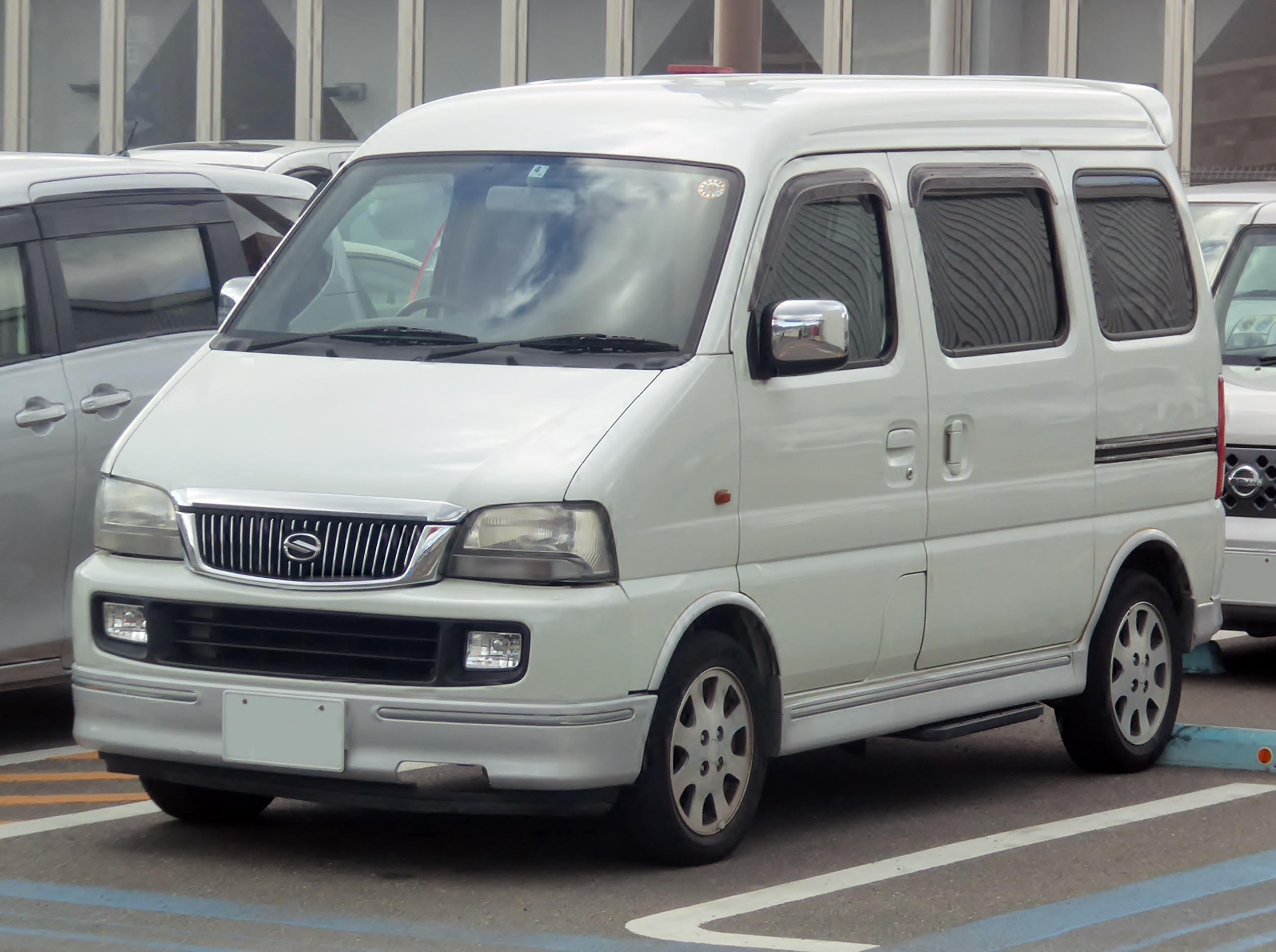
Suzuki Every Landy

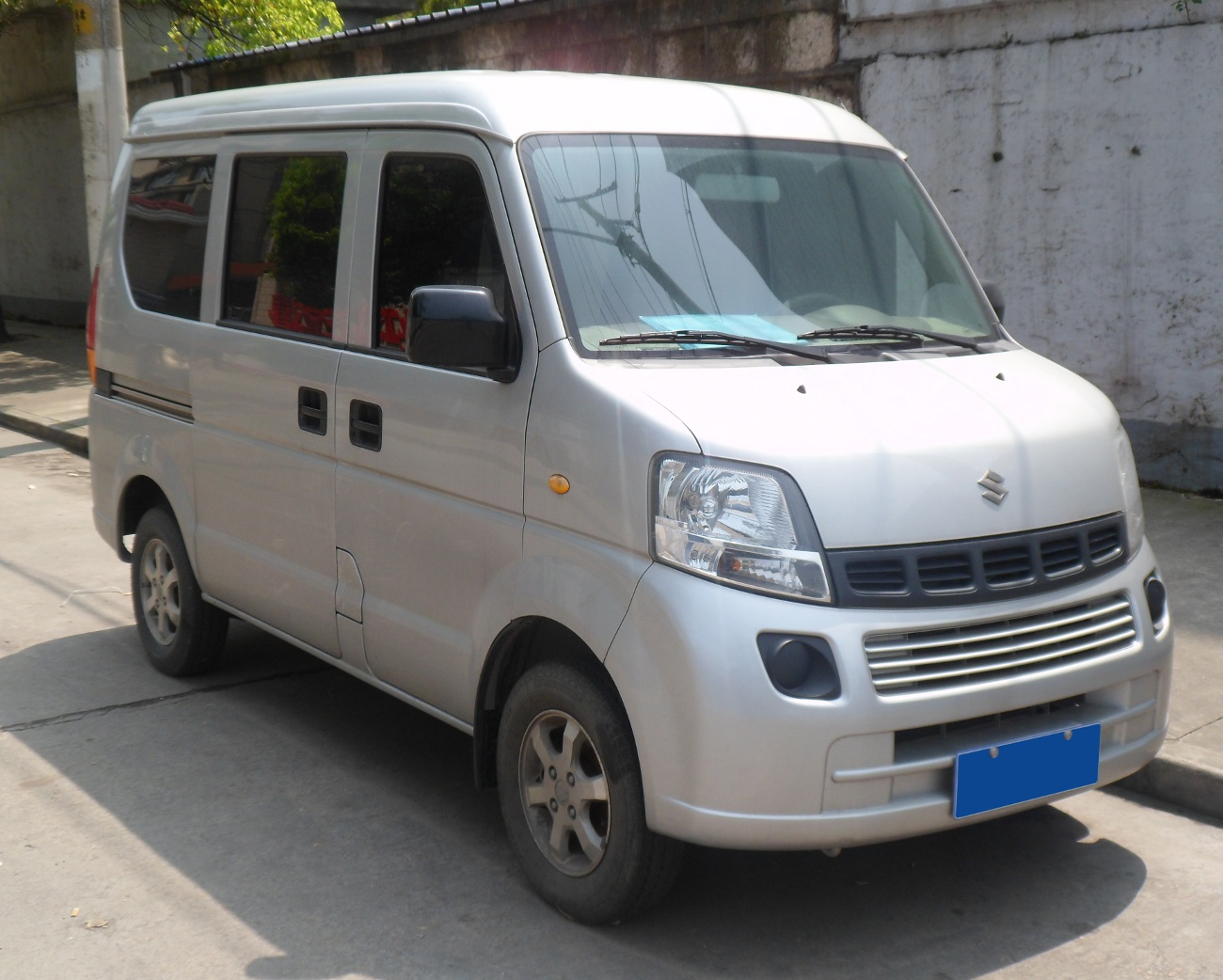
Changhe Suzuki Landy (China)

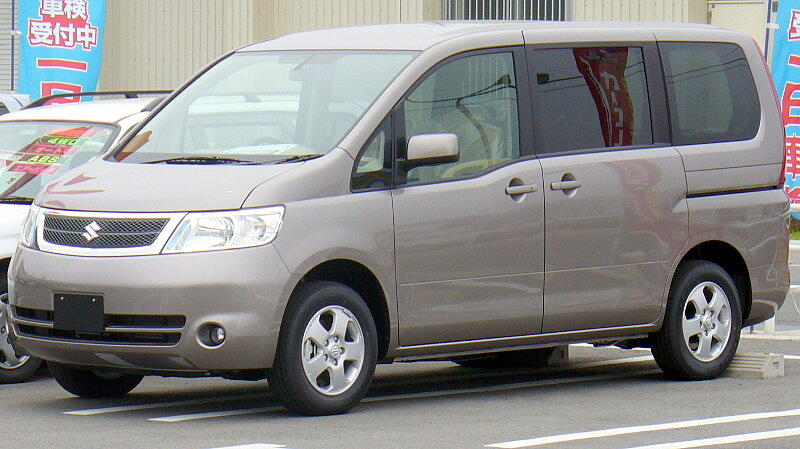
Suzuki Landy (C25)

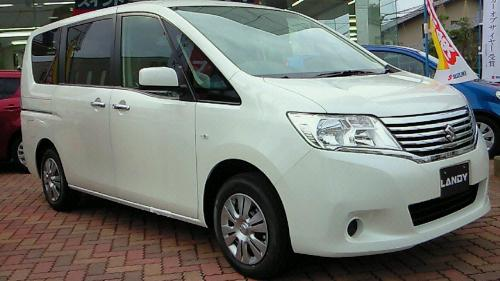
Suzuki Landy (C26)

Suzuki Landy (C27)

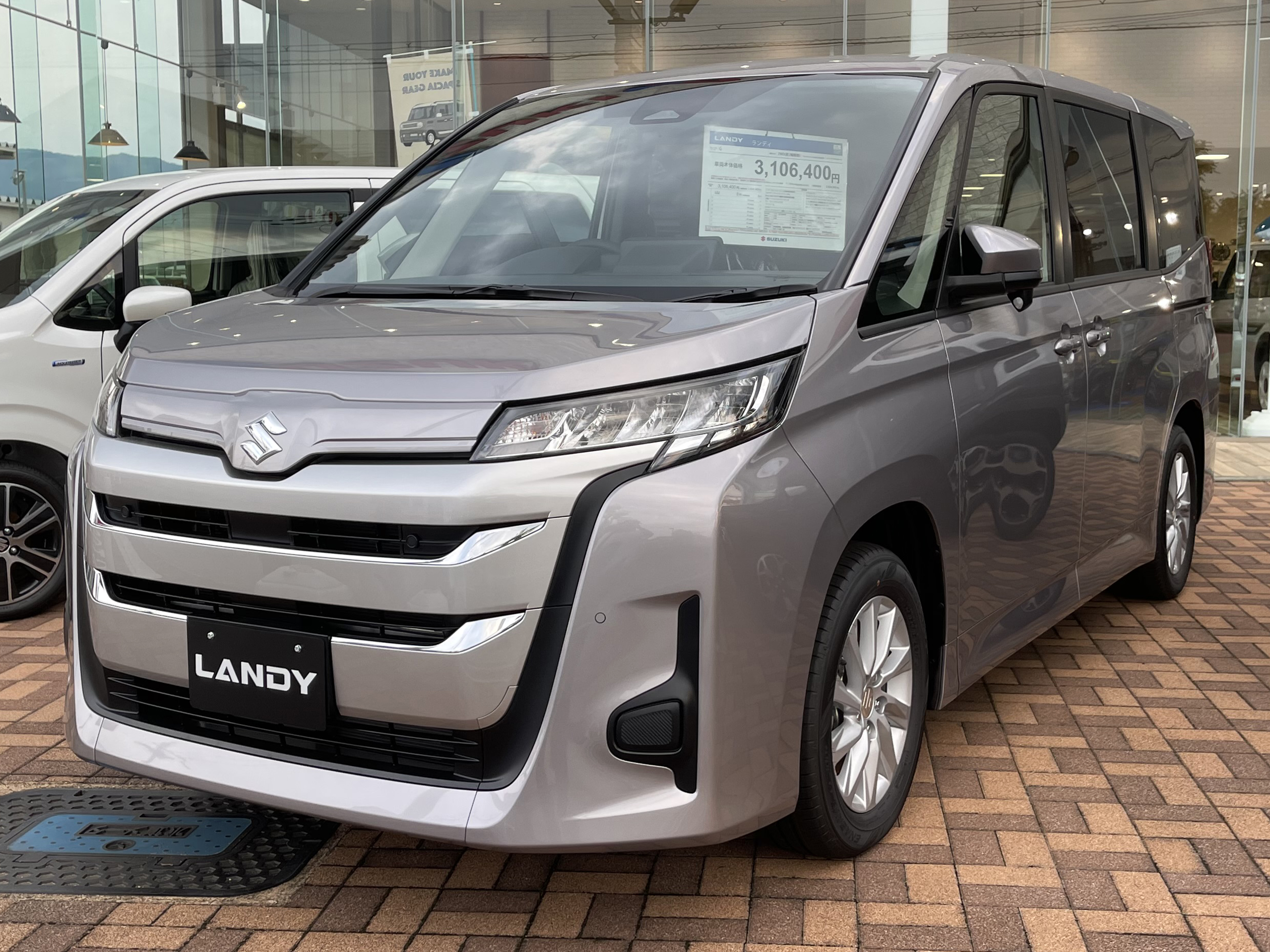
Suzuki Landy (R90)
