= Ditte Ejlerskov =

Danish contemporary artist

Ditte Ejlerskov (born 1982) is a Danish contemporary artist. She was born in Frederikshavn, Denmark, and lives and works in Denmark. In 2017, her official portrait of Helle Thorning-Schmidt at Christiansborg was positively received by local critics.

Parts of Ejlerskovs artistic process consist of interaction with the Internet. Everything from written correspondence with email-scammers, paparazzi photographs downloaded from Google and contemporary music videos are brought into Ejlerskovs universe. With simultaneous disdain and fascination, Ejlerskov started to use Rihanna as a motif in her work. A few years ago, Ejlerskov was drawn to Barbados, Rihanna's home country, after an email correspondence with an Internet scammer. The scammer and Ejlerskov exchanged a series of emails, all of which was turned into a book and a film before she again started to focus on the painting. Ejlerskov's work investigate thematic and perceptual experiences pertaining to her generation, but also with references to post-colonial and post-feminist ideas. A large part of her work deals with contemporary pop-culture, where the purpose is to draw attention to what is happening in the intermediate positions, between the private and public space.

The main tool in Ditte Ejlerskov's practice is media literacy. Most of Ejlerskov's work is founded on interactions with the Internet; written correspondences with email-scammers from exotic parts of the world, translations of trashy paparazzi photos into large scale abstract paintings or detailed medieval-looking copperplate etchings based on imagery from a contemporary music video. Her abstract and representational paintings analyse and explore the potential of painting as medium itself, as well as they are tools for interpreting our contemporary reality.

Most of Ejlerskov's work has a feminist angle and questions the space between the personal and the public; suggesting an individual experience within a stream of collective consciousness. The work "About: The Blank Pages" is a collaboration with EvaMarie Lindahl and it highlights Taschen Basic Art – a book series that consists of 95 books of artists's biographies, 5 of which are of women artists.

== Exhibitions ==
Ejlerskov has mainly exhibited at institutions in Sweden. For example, at Malmö Konsthall in Malmö, at Malmö Art Museum in Malmö, at Skissernas Museum in Lund, Uppsala Konstmuseum in Uppsala and at Konstakademin in Stockholm. She has also exhibited in Norway at Kristiansand Kunsthall in Kristiansand and at Stenersenmuseet in Oslo, at Den Frie Udstillingsbygning and Kunsthal Charlottenborg in Copenhagen, Denmark, at CCA Andratx in Andratx, Spain, at Bonn Art Museum in Bonn, Germany, at Amos Anderson Art Museum in Helsinki, Finland and at Barbara Davis Gallery in Houston, Texas, US. Ejlerskov was nominated for Carnegie Art Award 2012.

== Reviews ==
- Ditte Ejlerskov, un bon coup de Minaj (Libération) (in French)
- Whatever happened to the sisterhood (Mousse Magazine) (in English)
- Alongside (Houston Press) (in English)
- Taschen Under Fire (Kunstkritikk) (in English)
- Feminist history in the making (Culture Nordic) (in English)
- En lyckad konstkupp (Konstrelaterat) (in Swedish)
- Gesterna på parad (Sydsvenskan) (in Swedish)
- Lika genialt som trivialt (Sydsvenskan) (in Swedish)
- Abstraktion och realism kolliderar (Sydsvenskan) (in Swedish)
- Painting is hard core and non-specific (Helsingin Sanomat) (in Finnish)
- Afrikansk svindel forvandles til kunst (U-lands Nyt) (in Danish)
