= EvaMarie Lindahl =

Swedish artist (born 1976)

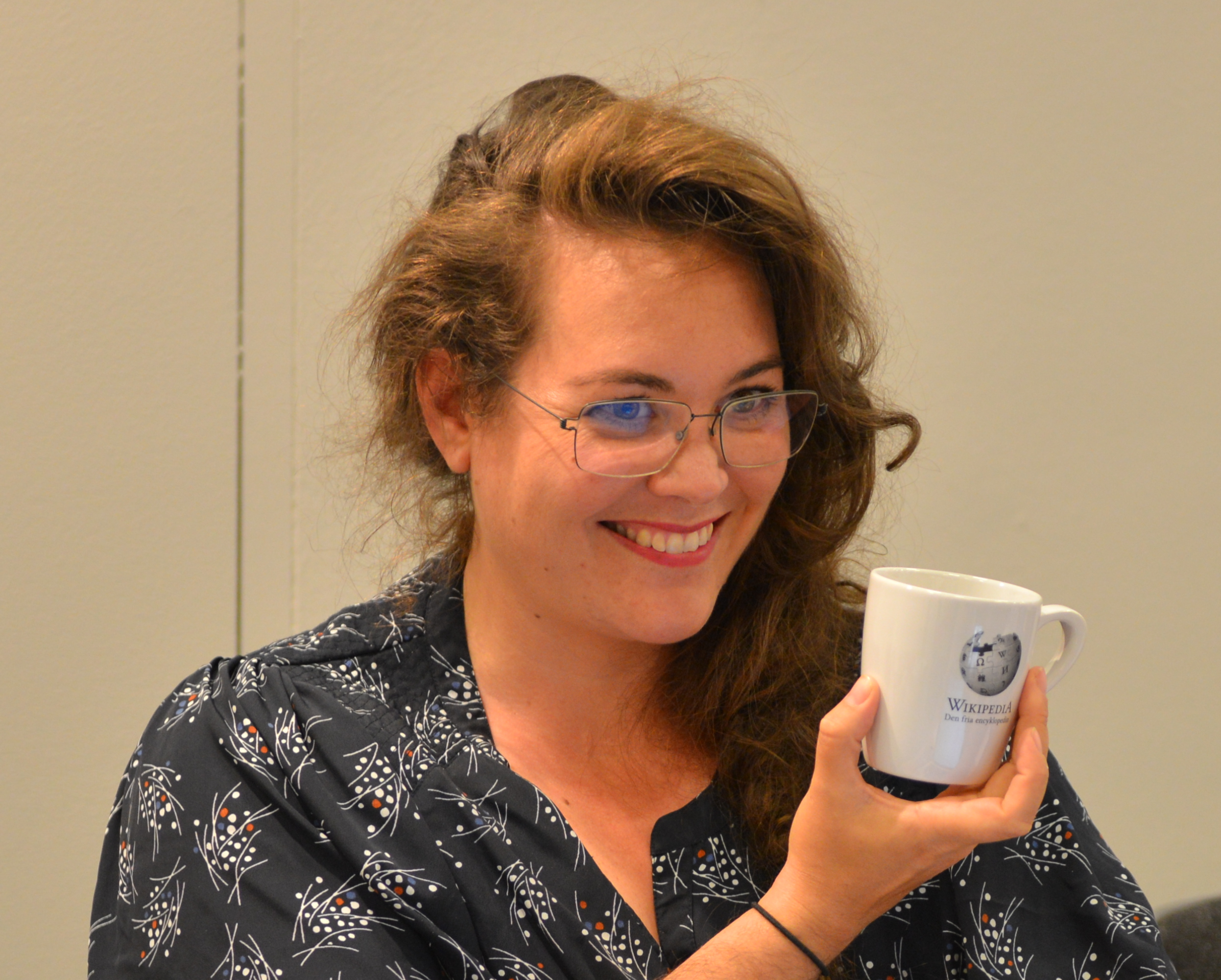
EvaMarie Lindahl, 2014.

EvaMarie Lindahl (born 1 December 1976) is a Swedish artist, who works mainly in pencil drawing.

She was born in Viken, Sweden, and studied at Gotland School of Art, Funen Art Academy, Umeå Art Academy, and completed a Master of Fine Arts at Malmö Art Academy in 2008. She lives in Malmö.

In 2014 she collaborated with Danish artist Ditte Ejlerskov on an installation artwork "About: The Blank Pages" to highlight the "missing" books on women artists in the Taschen Basic Art series, which includes 97 books of artists' biographies, but only 5 female artists among 92 men. The installation includes the 97 Taschen books, and 100 similar "books" on women artists, with covers created by Ejlerskov and Lindahl but containing only blank pages, from Artemisia Gentileschi and Louise Élisabeth Vigée Le Brun to Berthe Morisot, Louise Bourgeois and Bridget Riley.
