= Marlene Taschen =

German publisher

- Born: 25 September 1985 (age 41); Cologne, West Germany
- Education: London School of Economics (M.S.); Kingston University London (B.A.)
- Occupation: Chief Executive Officer at TASCHEN
- Notable work: James Lovelock et al. The Earth and I
- Website: taschen.com

Marlene Taschen (born 25 September 1985, Cologne) is a German publisher and CEO of Taschen.

== Life and career ==
Marlene Taschen was born in Cologne, Germany, in 1985. She is the eldest daughter of Taschen founder Benedikt Taschen and his first wife, Daniela Henke.

She holds an MSc in Social and Cultural Psychology from the London School of Economics and a bachelor’s degree in business and psychology from Kingston University London. Before joining Taschen, she lived and worked in the United Kingdom, Panama, and Australia, gaining experience in brand management, project development, and the cultural sector.

Taschen began her career as a project manager at The Museum of Everything, an experimental art initiative founded by James Brett in London. She later joined Taschen, starting in retail operations at the company's stores in London and New York in 2011. Over time, she took on expanded roles in business development, e-commerce, distribution, and store operations.

In 2017, she was appointed CEO of Taschen, assuming joint leadership of the publishing house with her father. Since then, she has led significant operational and structural developments within the company, including the expansion of international offices and retail locations. Taschen now operates eleven stores and five offices globally, including in Cologne, Paris, London, Milan, and Los Angeles.

She serves as Chair of the Instituto Terra Endowment Fund and lives in Milan with her husband, Maia Guarnaccia, and their two daughters.
