= Suzuki G70 =

Suzuki concept vehicle

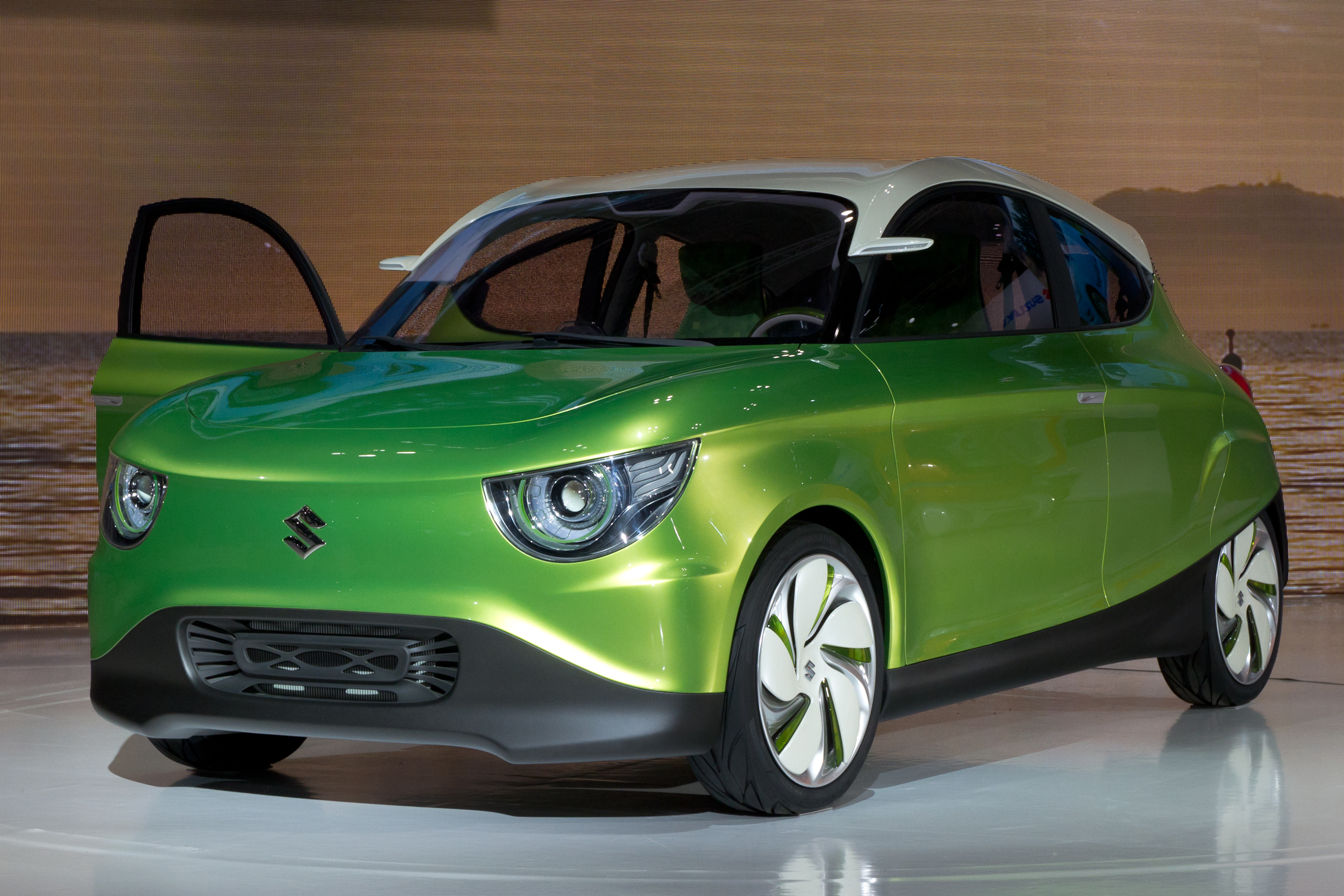
- 2011 Suzuki Regina (G70) at the Tokyo Motor Show

Overview
- Manufacturer: Suzuki
- Also called: Suzuki Regina (Tokyo Motor Show)
- Production: 2011

Body and chassis
- Class: Subcompact (B)
- Body style: 5-door hatchback
- Layout: Front-engine, front-wheel drive (FF)

Powertrain
- Engine: 800cc turbo ICE
- Transmission: CVT automatic

Dimensions
- Wheelbase: ~2,425 mm (95.5 in)
- Length: ~3,550 mm (140 in)
- Width: ~1,630 mm (64 in)
- Height: ~1,640 mm (65 in)
- Curb weight: ~730 kg (1,610 lb)

The Suzuki G70 (formerly Suzuki Regina) is a subcompact hatchback concept revealed by Japanese automobile manufacturer Suzuki at the 2011 Tokyo Motor Show.

== Overview ==
The Suzuki G70 concept was initially revealed at the Tokyo Motor Show on December 2, 2011, in Tokyo, Japan as the Suzuki Regina, alongside the second-generation Suzuki Swift Sport, the Swift EV Hybrid concept, and the Q Concept, as the automaker's idea of a fuel-efficient global small car. The Regina was later shown at the Geneva Motor Show the following year on March 8, 2012, in Geneva, Switzerland as the G70. The new name was chosen to reflect its low produced CO_{2} emissions of 70 g (0.15 lb) per kilometer. The name was initially used during development of the concept.

== Specifications ==
=== Technical specifications ===
The Suzuki G70 concept uses a 800cc turbocharged internal combustion engine with a start-stop system and a CVT automatic transmission, and is in the front-engine, front-wheel drive layout. Also featured in the G70 concept is regenerative braking.

=== Exterior ===
The exterior of the Suzuki G70 is somewhat resemblant of the Citroën DS, as described by Car and Driver, for its overall shape and semi-covered rear wheels. The concept is painted in a bright green with a white roof, and features white rims with green accents.

=== Interior ===
The interior of the Suzuki G70 concept continues the exterior color scheme of green, white, and black, and features a large front center touchscreen.
