= Taschen =

German art book publisher

- Status: GmbH
- Founded: 1980; 46 years ago
- Founder: Benedikt Taschen
- Country of origin: Germany
- Headquarters location: Cologne
- Distribution: Worldwide including Ingram Publisher Services (US) and Littlehampton Book Services (UK)
- Key people: Benedikt Taschen; Marlene Taschen
- Publication types: Art books
- Nonfiction topics: Arts
- No. of employees: 250
- Official website: www.taschen.com

Taschen is a luxury art book publisher founded in 1980 by Benedikt Taschen in Cologne, Germany. As of January 2017, Taschen is co-managed by Benedikt Taschen and his eldest daughter, Marlene Taschen.

Taschen focuses on making lesser-seen art and imagery available to bookstores. The firm has brought potentially controversial art and imagery, including fetishistic imagery, queer art, historical erotica, pornography, and adult magazines (including multiple books with Playboy magazine) into broader public view, publishing it alongside its books of comics reprints, art photography, painting, design, fashion, advertising history, film, and architecture.

Taschen publications are available in a various sizes, from oversized tomes and limited editions, to small pocket-sized books. The company has also produced calendars, address books, and postcards sets.

== History ==
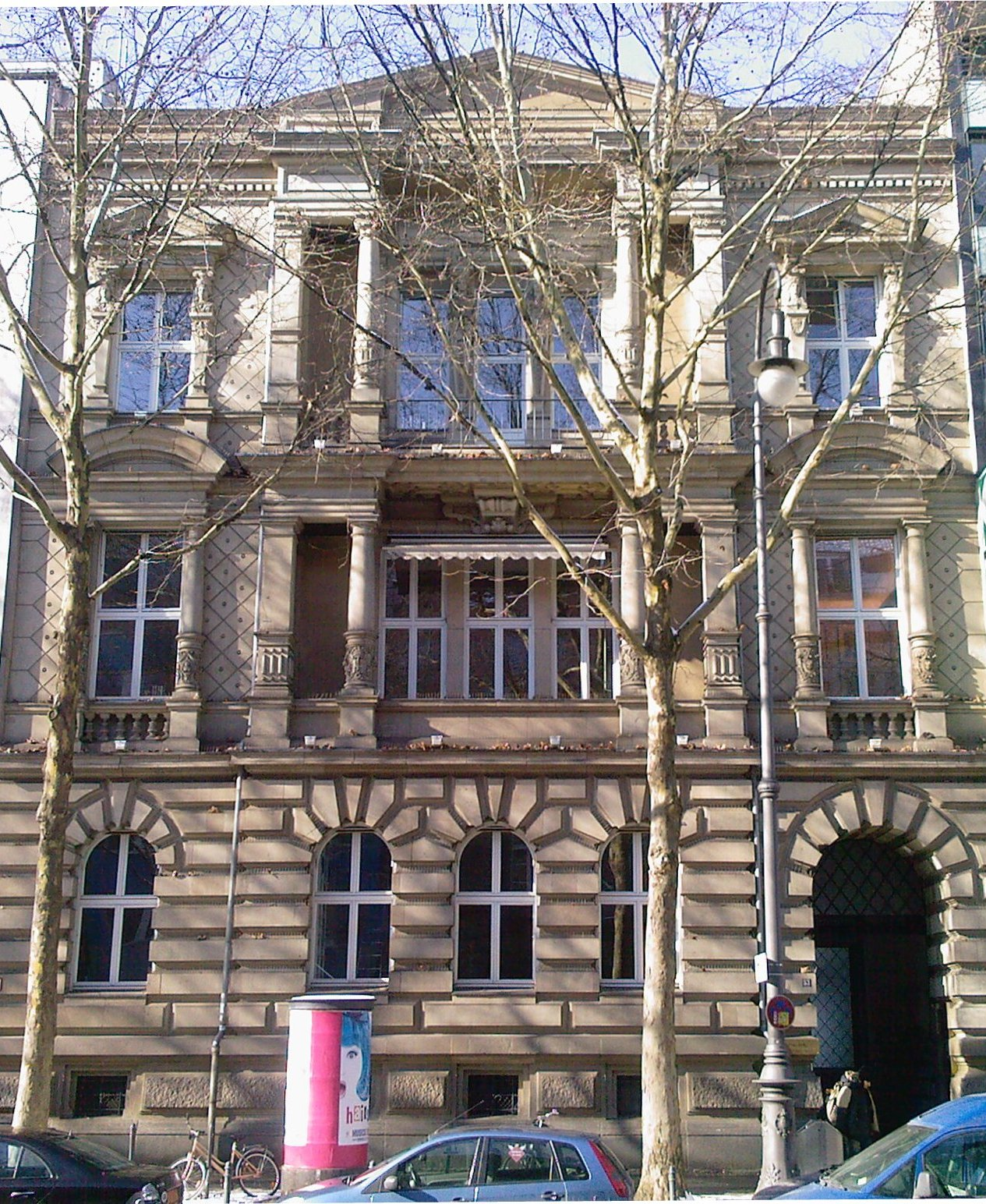
Taschen headquarters on Hohenzollernring 53, Cologne

The company began as Taschen Comics, publishing Benedikt's comic collection.

In 1985, Taschen introduced the Basic Art series with an inaugural title on Salvador Dalí. Today's series comprises over 100 titles available in up to 30 languages, each about a separate artist, from classical to contemporary. Further series followed, alongside an expansion into new themes like architecture, design, film, and lifestyle. For example, the firm also publishes a "Basic Architecture" series in the same style as "Basic Art" that covers some of the most prominent architects in history.

=== Representation of artists ===
In the spring of 2014, the firm's Basic Art Series drew criticism in Swedish public media for the limited number of female artists represented. At the time, the series comprised 95 volumes, of which only five focused on women. Malmö Konsthall in Sweden first highlighted the disparity, following a project by the artists Ditte Ejlerskov and EvaMarie Lindahl. Commentators noted that the imbalance reflected a broader tendency within the established art historical canon, which had traditionally emphasized male artists. In subsequent years TASCHEN expanded the series to include additional women such as Frida Kahlo and Hilma af Klint, and has also published a range of titles dedicated to female artists, designers, and photographers across its wider catalogue.

=== The Helmut Newton SUMO ===
In 1999, Taschen expanded to the luxury market with the Helmut Newton SUMO.

Signed and limited to 10,000 copies, the folio-sized publication quickly sold out. It later became the most expensive book published in the 20th century, with SUMO copy number 1 selling at auction for $304,000.

This book paved the way for Taschen's GOAT – Greatest Of All Time, an homage to Muhammad Ali, which Der Spiegel called "the biggest, heaviest, most radiant thing ever printed in the history of civilization".

Further Collector's Editions followed, including titles with Nobuyoshi Araki, Peter Beard, David Hockney, Marvin E. Newman, David LaChapelle, Sebastião Salgado, Annie Leibovitz, and The Rolling Stones, often reaching ten times their original price within a few years.

== Book series ==
=== Taschen Basic Art ===
Taschen's Basic Art series, launched in 1985 with a monograph on Salvador Dalí, has become one of the publisher's best-known and longest-running collections. Conceived as an affordable introduction to major figures in art history, each volume combines accessible texts with high-quality reproductions and is typically published in multiple languages. Over time the series has expanded to include more than 100 titles, covering artists from the Renaissance to contemporary practice, including Leonardo da Vinci, Frida Kahlo, Jean-Michel Basquiat, and Yayoi Kusama. The books are widely distributed in museums, bookstores, and academic settings, and have been credited with helping to democratise access to art publishing by offering scholarly yet inexpensive surveys to a global readership.

The Basic Art series now also incorporates the basic architecture books.

=== Bibliotheca Universalis ===
Taschen's Bibliotheca Universalis is a series of famous artworks in an affordable (about 15 euros) hardback format (14 x 19.5 cm). They are generally multilingual, with English, German and French texts and legends. Some books are also published in Spanish, Italian and European Portuguese.

=== Taschen Basic Architecture ===
Taschen Basic Architecture is a series of books on architects published by Taschen. Each book looks at a different architect, with a biography and pictures of their work.

=== Sexy Books ===
Since the early 2000s Taschen has maintained a distinct catalogue of erotic and sexually themed titles marketed under its Sexy Books line. The collection ranges from anthologies of vintage erotica (Erotica Universalis, History of Men's Magazines) to contemporary photography (Ren Hang, Araki by Araki) and pop-culture surveys such as The Art of Pin-up and Sexy Record Covers (2025). These publications often combine archival material with critical essays, situating erotic imagery within broader histories of art, design, and popular culture. While controversial, the line has been noted for treating sexual content with the same design quality and scholarly framing as Taschen's art and photography monographs. Critics have argued that this approach has helped preserve and legitimise visual traditions—such as pin-up illustration, fetish photography, and men's magazines—that were often excluded from mainstream publishing or marginalised in institutional collections.

== Locations ==
Through the mid-to-late 1990s, the company expanded by opening stores in other cities. Some dedicated flagship Taschen bookstores, conceived in collaboration with artists and designers such as Albert Oehlen, Beatriz Milhazes, Jonas Wood, Marc Newson, Mark Grotjahn, Philippe Starck, and Toby Ziegler, are located in:

- Berlin
- Beverly Hills
- Brussels
- Cologne
- Dallas (Taschen Library)
- Hollywood
- Hong Kong
- London
- Madrid
- Miami
- Milan
- Paris

The firm has publishing offices in Berlin, Cologne, London, Paris, Los Angeles, and Hong Kong.

Between 2014 and 2018, Taschen owned and curated its own 6,000-square feet art gallery space in Los Angeles, featuring exhibitions on Michael Muller, Mick Rock, Ellen von Unwerth, and Albert Watson. The publishing house employs more than 250 staff members worldwide and many freelance editors.

== General bibliography ==
- Bernhard, Brendan (11 September 2002). "Sex & Beauty, Art & Kitsch: The Exquisite Mayhem of Benedikt Taschen". LA Weekly.
- Kirkpatrick, David D. (7 January 2002). "Price Cutting and Oversupply Imperil Art Book Houses". The New York Times.
