= Benedikt Taschen =

German publisher

- Born: 10 February 1961 (age 65); Cologne, West Germany
- Occupations: Publisher & Art Collector
- Spouses: Daniela Taschen (m. 1985; div. 1995) Angelika Taschen (m. 1996; div. 2004) Lauren Taschen (m. 2005)
- Children: Marlene Taschen; Benedikt Taschen Jr.; Charlotte Taschen; Laszlo Taschen; Balthazar Taschen
- Website: taschen.com

Benedikt Taschen (born 10 February 1961) is a German publisher and contemporary art collector. He is the founder and managing director of the publishing house Taschen, an international publisher known for publications on a range of themes including art, architecture, design, film, photography, pop culture, and lifestyle.

== Early life ==
Benedikt Taschen is the youngest of five children; both of his parents were doctors. From an early age he was an enthusiastic reader and comic book fan. At 12 years old, he began a successful mail order business selling used comic books from the United States.

== Founding of TASCHEN ==
In February 1980, the day before his 19th birthday, he opened a 250-square-foot (23 m^{2}) comic book store, named TASCHEN COMICS, in his home town of Cologne, Germany, in which he put his extensive comic book collection up for sale. Soon he began publishing comic books himself.

=== Entry into art book publishing ===
In 1984, his venture into the art book business began after he borrowed money from an aunt and purchased 40,000 remainder copies of an English-language Magritte monograph for one dollar apiece at a trade show in the United States. Within two months, he had resold all the books at an affordable retail price of 9.95 Deutsche Mark. To Taschen, this demonstrated a gap in the art book market, until then dominated by expensive editions, and made it clear there was demand for well-designed, inexpensive, multilingual illustrated art books. He then made his first publishing foray in art books with a monograph on photographer Annie Leibovitz. By the end of the 1980s TASCHEN titles were available in over a dozen languages at prices that made art books affordable to students and collectors alike.

=== International recognition and SUMO series ===
By the late 1990s, he had become known in publishing. When Vanity Fair’s Matt Tyrnauer described him as, “one of the few people in business who has the courage to do exactly what he wants whenever he wants to”, Benedikt Taschen tested the theory with Helmut Newton’s SUMO, the largest bound book of the 20th century, released in 1999 with its own stand designed by Philippe Starck, at what was then the price of $1500. Critics called him crazy, and predicted a major loss for the company, but by the time of the book's release 7000 of the 10,000 signed and numbered copies had been pre-sold. The book made TASCHEN's name internationally, and led to the even more ambitious GOAT — Greatest of All Time, a tribute to Muhammad Ali, published in Spring 2004. Four years in the making, GOAT weighs 75lbs and is 20" × 20" in size, with nearly 800 pages of archival and original photographs, graphic artwork and articles and essays – including those of Ali himself. The SUMO line - oversized books with accompanying unique stands conceived by internationally acclaimed designers - is now a well established part of the company, including titles celebrating the works of Sebastiåo Salgado, David Hockney, David Bailey, Annie Liebovitz and the history of the Rolling Stones.

== Architecture and collections ==
In 1998, Taschen purchased the 1961 John Lautner–designed Chemosphere House in the Hollywood Hills, long considered the most modern house in the world, and restored it precisely to Lautner's original vision, including installation of laser-cut black slate floors impossible to produce at the time the house was conceived.

=== Personal life and recognition ===
In 2000, Billy Wilder told magazine Vanity Fair that “Benedikt reminds me of an old-time Hollywood figure. A studio head, someone who is in firm command and has his hand in everything.” In turn, Matt Weiner, creator and producer of the hit series Mad Men, described Taschen as “a miracle of taste in publishing ... He consistently maintains incredible quality in content and style ... He documents both the present and the past in an indispensable way.”

=== Art collection ===
Alongside his work in publishing, Taschen has also made a name for himself as a collector of contemporary art. Initially concentrating on German artists like Martin Kippenberger, Albert Oehlen, and Günther Förg, he has since the late 1980s acquired numerous works by American artists like Jeff Koons, Mike Kelley, and Christopher Wool. In 2004, the Reina Sofía Museum dedicated an extensive exhibition to his private collection. Benedikt Taschen has continuously been listed in the ARTnews 'Top 200 collectors' since 2003, artnet ranks him and his wife Lauren first among the “10 Los Angeles Art Power Couples”. In 2013, Taschen gave 15 works from his private collection to the Städel Museum in Frankfurt to reinforce their collection's focus on German painting of the 1980s.

=== Philanthropy ===
In 2014, Taschen donated $500,000 to the Wende Museum in Culver City, California, to facilitate the founding of an international center for the exploration and preservation of the culture, art, design, and history of the Cold War. Benedikt and his wife Lauren Taschen also donated an extensive collection of works by young American and European artists to MOCA in Los Angeles.

== Personal life ==
Taschen is in his third marriage, to Lauren Taschen, and has five children; three from his first and two from his third marriage. His eldest daughter, Marlene, began work at the publishing house in 2011 and has risen to managing director of the company. Taschen lives and works in Los Angeles.

== Awards and honors ==
- 2013 Lucie Awards
- 2016 Photographic Publishing Award, Royal Photographic Society, Bath, UK
- 2018 Order of Merit of the Federal Republic of Germany

== Quotes ==
Basically, everything I ever needed to learn about capitalism I learnt from Carl Barks and his characters Donald Duck and Uncle Scrooge.

— Benedikt Taschen, The Wealth Collection, Winter 2009.

Benedikt reminds me of an old-time Hollywood figure—a studio head, someone who is in firm command and has his hand in everything.

— Billy Wilder, Vanity Fair, October 2000.

I have done a lot of books, and I can tell you — without mentioning names — that publishers are not all like him. There are very few like him. Or there are none like him. He is also, I might add, a madman.

— Helmut Newton, Vanity Fair, October 2000.
