= Ritz =

Ritz or The Ritz may refer to:

== Facilities and structures ==
=== Hotels ===
- The Ritz Hotel, London, a hotel in London, England
  - Ritz Club casino
- Hôtel Ritz Paris, a hotel in Paris, France
- Hotel Ritz (Madrid), a hotel in Madrid, Spain
- Hotel Ritz (Lisbon), a hotel in Lisbon, Portugal
- The Ritz-Carlton Hotel Company, parent company to the Ritz-Carlton hotel chain
  - Ritz-Carlton Atlantic City, a former hotel in New Jersey, United States
  - The Ritz-Carlton Millenia Singapore, a hotel in Singapore
  - Ritz-Carlton Montreal, a hotel in Montreal, Canada
  - Ritz-Carlton Tokyo, a hotel in Roppongi, Tokyo, Japan
  - Ritz-Carlton Hotel (New York City), a former hotel in New York City
  - Ritz-Carlton, Riyadh, a hotel in Riyadh, Saudi Arabia
- The Ritz-Carlton Yacht Collection, a luxury cruise line operating under a brand license from The Ritz-Carlton Hotel Company
- Ritz Beach Club, a former beach resort in South Andros, Andros, Bahamas

=== Other structures ===
- Ritz (Austin, Texas), a historic theater
- Ritz Cinema (disambiguation)
- Ritz Theatre (disambiguation)
- Ritz Tower, a residential building in New York City
- The Ritz (Manchester), a Manchester, England Rock club, in which Ian Gillan and The Charlatans have both recorded
- The Ritz (rock club), a New York City Rock club that existed in the 1980s and early 1990s

== People ==
- César Ritz (1850–1918), hotelier
- Charles Ritz (1891–1976), son of César Ritz
- Glenda Ritz (born 1954), Indiana politician
- Walther Ritz (1878–1909), theoretical physicist
- Rosalie Ritz (1923–2008), pioneering courtroom artist
- David Ritz (born c. 1942), author
- Gerry Ritz (born 1951), Canadian federal politician
- Ritz Brothers, comedy team from the 1920s through the 1960s
- Dathan Ritzenhein (born 1982), American distance runner and Olympian, often referred to as "Ritz"
- Rittz (Jonathan McCollum; born 1980), American rapper
- DiDa Ritz, American drag queen

=== Fictional characters ===
- Fritzi Ritz, a major character in the long-running comic strip Nancy (comic strip).
- Ritz Malheur, a fictional character in Final Fantasy Tactics Advance

== Music ==
- "Ritz", a rock song on The Psychomodo album by Steve Harley & Cockney Rebel
- The Ritz (quartet), a barbershop quartet that won the International Championship in 1991

== Television, theatre, films ==
- The Ritz (film), the 1976 film version of the play
- The Ritz (play), a 1975 Broadway play by Terrence McNally
- The Ritz (TV series), a 1987 BBC television series

== Other uses ==
- Ritz (cigarette), a Portuguese brand
- Ritz (crater), a lunar impact crater located on the far side of the Moon
- Ritz Camera & Image, in the United States
- Ritz Crackers, a brand of snack crackers
- Ritz Metro, a Mexican snack
- Ritz Newspaper, sometimes Ritz Magazine, a defunct UK fashion and gossip periodical
- Ritz Video, a chain of video rental stores in the United Kingdom that was bought out by Blockbuster
- Maruti Suzuki Ritz, the Indian version of the Suzuki Splash, a hatchback city car
- Rydberg–Ritz combination principle
- Ritz method (mathematics)

== See also ==
- Puttin' On the Ritz (disambiguation)
- Rytz, a Swiss surname
- Writs
