= Ritz (cigarette) =

Portuguese cigarette brand

- Product type: Cigarette
- Current owner: British American Tobacco
- Produced by: Tabaqueira
- Country: Brazil
- Introduced: 1970; 56 years ago
- Markets: See Markets

Ritz is a Brazilian brand of cigarettes, owned by multinational British American Tobacco. Ritz cigarettes are manufactured by Tabaqueira (subsidiary of Altria) and Souza Cruz).

== History ==
The brand was created in 1970 and is sold in Portugal and Brazil.

As of 2016, it holds a market share of 0,8% on the Brazilian market, which is a lot less compared to brands like Hollywood (5,92%) and Derby (3,93%).

== Controversy ==
In January 1997, counterfeit cigarettes from known brands like Ritz, but also Hollywood and Derby, were sold in Paraguay. According to Mário Aguilera, legal representative of Souza Cruz in Ciudad del Este, Boqueron manufactures between 20 and 25 thousand boxes of illegal cigarettes per month for the Paraguayan market. In Brazil, The Third Section of the STJ (Superior Court of Justice) has determined that the 1st Criminal Court of the District of Poços de Caldas (MG) can search and seize counterfeit cigarettes with illegal tax stamps being sold on the Brazilian market, as well as arrest the sellers of said illegal cigarettes.

== Markets ==
Ritz is mainly sold in Portugal and Brazil, but was or is also sold in Sweden, Finland, United States and Paraguay.

== See also ==
- Tobacco smoking
