= Hollywood (cigarette) =

Brazilian cigarette brand

- Product type: Cigarette
- Current owner: British American Tobacco
- Produced by: Souza Cruz
- Country: Brazil
- Introduced: 1931; 95 years ago
- Discontinued: 2020
- Markets: See Markets
- Tagline: "Isto é Hollywood" ("This is Hollywood"), "Isto é Hollywood, O Sucesso!" ("This is Hollywood, what a success!").

Hollywood was a Brazilian brand of cigarette, owned and manufactured by Souza Cruz, a subsidiary of British American Tobacco. It was one of Brazil's best-known and sold cigarette brands, second to Derby brand.

== History ==
In 1903, Albino Souza Cruz, a manufacturer of cigarettes, settled in Rio de Janeiro and created a company to sell different brands of cigarettes. In 1931, he announced the launch of Hollywood cigarettes, which gradually became famous for using a slogan, namely, "success".

In the early 1970s, Souza Cruz invented the slogan "Isto é Hollywood" ("This is Hollywood"), popularizing the image through rustic and well related young practicing extreme sports. The motto remains alive to this day: ""Isto é Hollywood O Sucesso" ("This is Hollywood success").

The "young" practicing various kinds of sports, who were the characters in the TV advertisements, were responsible for the brand's success by associating it with the idea of adventure. The appeal took, too, to the patronage of a pioneer rock festival organized in Brazil, Hollywood Rock, in the summer of 1975 in Rio de Janeiro. The event was recorded in the breakneck pace of the same year.

In the 1990s, more ads were displayed, of which the "Flying Lap" commercial was one of them. TV sponsorship for Hollywood, as well as various other brands, ended once the Brazilian parliament voted to repeal cigarette advertisements on public television.

In mid 2016, the brand Marlboro has surpassed Hollywood as the most popular brand on Brazil, holding Hollywood as the second most popular.

In early 2020, BAT announced the Lucky Strike flavor would replace Hollywood until the end of the year, discarding all un-sold packs on January 2021

== Sponsorships ==
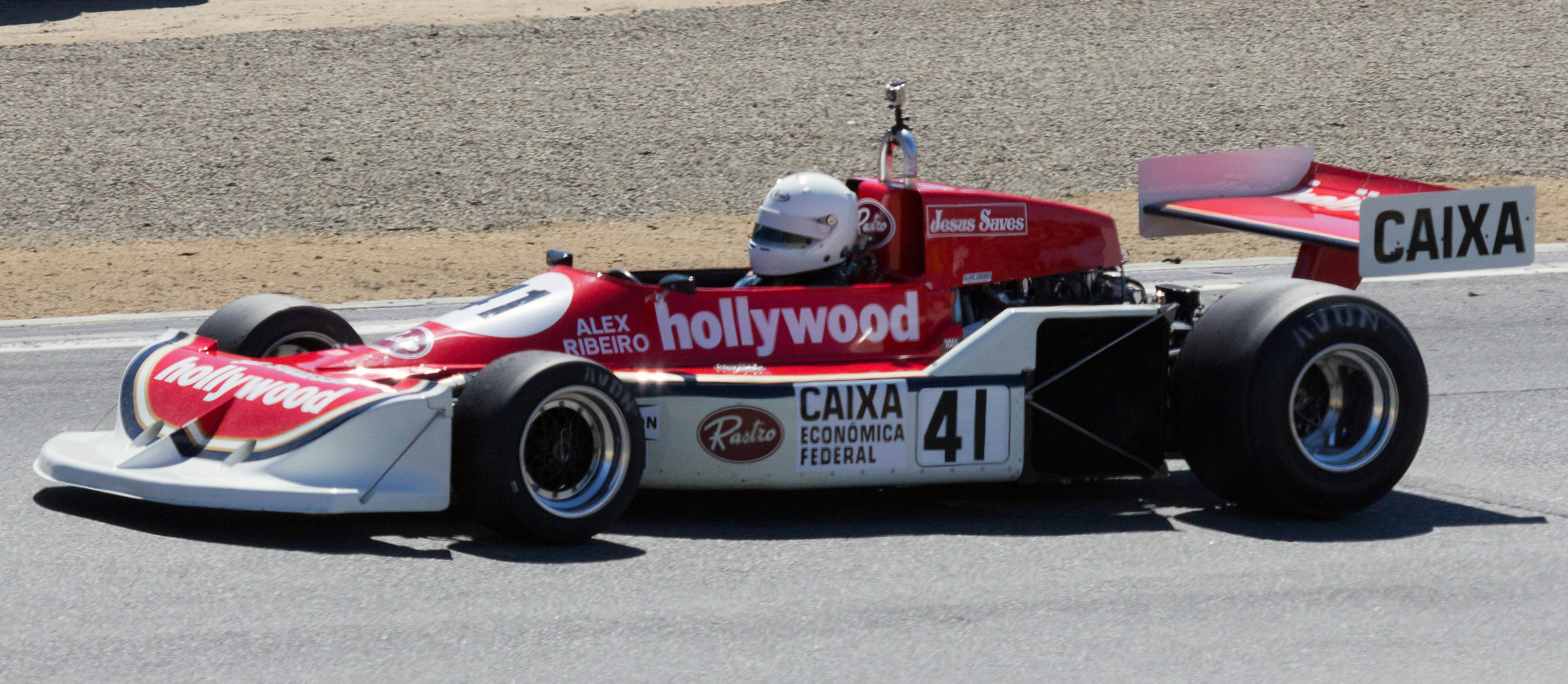
1976 March 761 c/n 761–8, raced by Robin Hunter at the 2011 Monterey Historics Races at Laguna Seca.

=== Formula 1 ===
During the 1977 Formula One season, the March F1 Team was sponsored by Hollywood cigarettes. Alex Ribeiro drove the car during all races.

=== CART ===
From 1993 until 1999 the Dick Simon Racing, Chip Ganassi Racing and PacWest Racing were sponsored by Hollywood cigarettes. Maurício Gugelmin drove the car. And was the main sponsor of Mo Nunn Racing during the 2000 and 2001 seasons.

== Markets ==
Hollywood cigarettes were mainly sold in Brazil, but being also available in Cuba, Paraguay, Germany, Czech Republic, Latvia, Slovakia, Belarus, Georgia and Bangladesh.

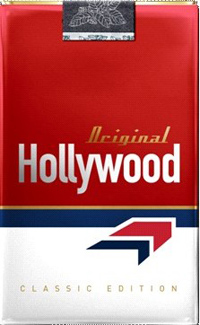
Pack of cigarettes

== See also ==
- Tobacco smoking
