= Ritz Theatre =

Ritz Theatre or Ritz Theater is the name of several facilities:

In England

- Ritz Theatre (Lincoln, England)

In Australia

- Ritz Cinema, Sydney, a heritage-listed theatre in Sydney, New South Wales

In the United States

- Ritz Theatre (Elizabeth, New Jersey)
- Ritz Theatre (Hollywood, California)
- Ritz Theatre (Los Angeles, California)
- Ritz Theatre (Brunswick, Georgia), contributing property of the Brunswick Old Town Historic District
- Ritz Theatre (Jacksonville), Duval County, Florida
- Wayne Densch Performing Arts Center, Sanford, Seminole County, Florida, formerly the Ritz Theater, the Milane Theatre, and the Helen Stairs Theatre
- Ritz Theatre (Haddon Township, New Jersey)
- Ritz Theater (Newburgh, New York), Orange County
- Walter Kerr Theatre, New York City, originally the Ritz Theatre
- Ritz Theatre and Hoskins Rexall Drug Store No. 2, on the National Register of Historic Places listings in Anderson County, Tennessee
- Ritz (Austin, Texas)

== See also ==
- Ritz (disambiguation), other cinemas and facilities named "Ritz"
- Ritz Cinema (disambiguation)
