= Rytz =

Rytz may refer to:

- David Rytz (1801–1868), Swiss mathematician and teacher
- Matthieu Rytz, Canadian documentary filmmaker
- Regula Rytz (born 1962), Swiss sociologist, historian, and politician

== See also ==
- Rytz's construction, a classical construction of Euclidean geometry
- Ritz
