= Opel Agila =

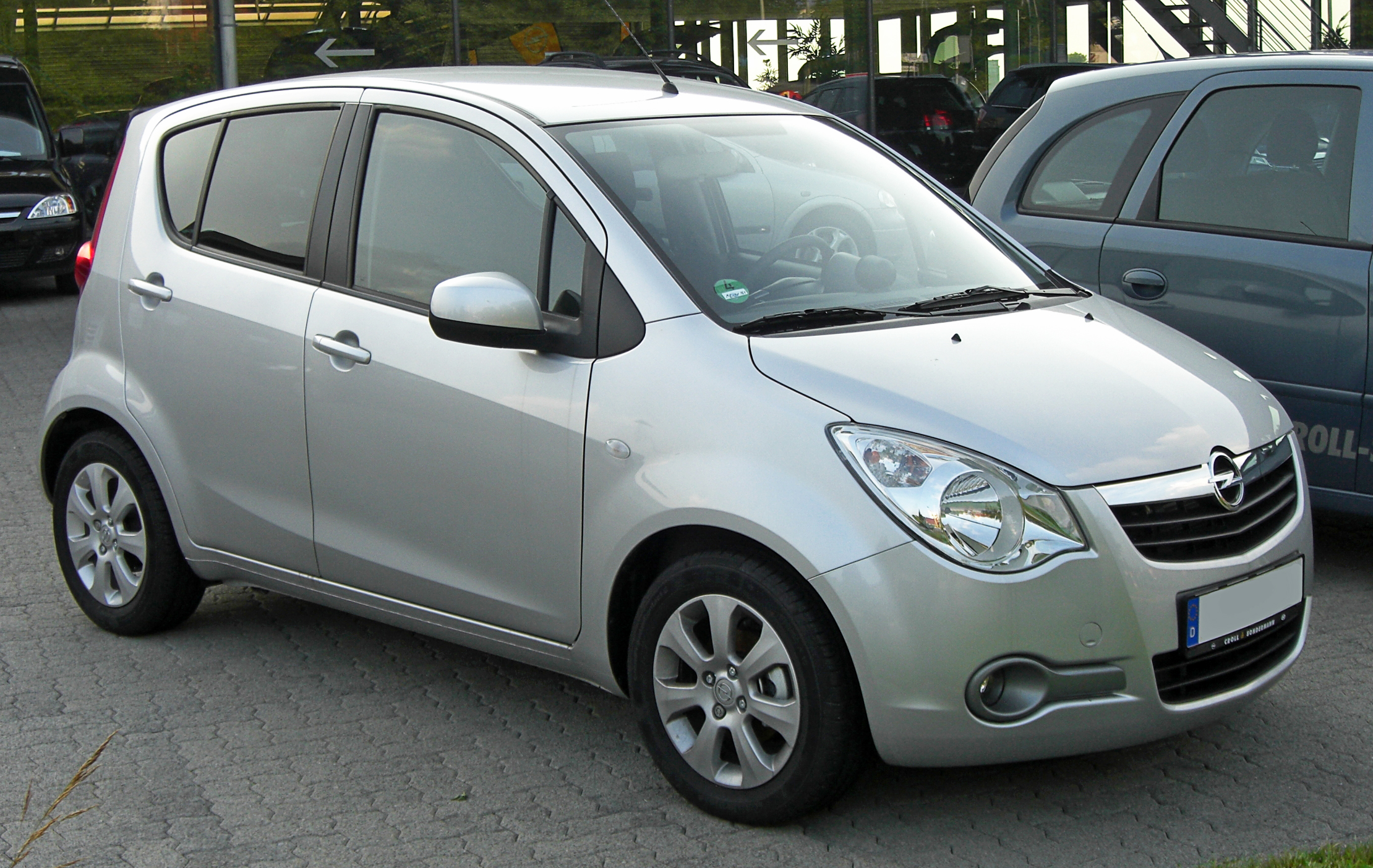

Overview
- Manufacturer: Suzuki
- Also called: Vauxhall Agila; Suzuki Wagon R-Wide (2000–2007); Suzuki Splash (2007–2014)
- Production: 2000–2014

Body and chassis
- Class: City car (A)
- Layout: Front-engine, front-wheel-drive

Chronology
- Successor: Opel Karl/Vauxhall Viva; Opel Adam

The Opel Agila (from Lat. agilis, "agile") is a city car marketed under the German marque Opel from 2000 to 2014, as a rebadged variant of the Suzuki Wagon R+ (first generation) and the Suzuki Splash (second generation). It has been marketed under the Vauxhall marque in the United Kingdom.

Its first generation was classified as a city car, whereas the second generation is a mini MPV, and the car was replaced in March 2015 by the Opel Karl, which is known as the Vauxhall Viva in the United Kingdom.

== First generation (H00; 2000) ==
Agila A
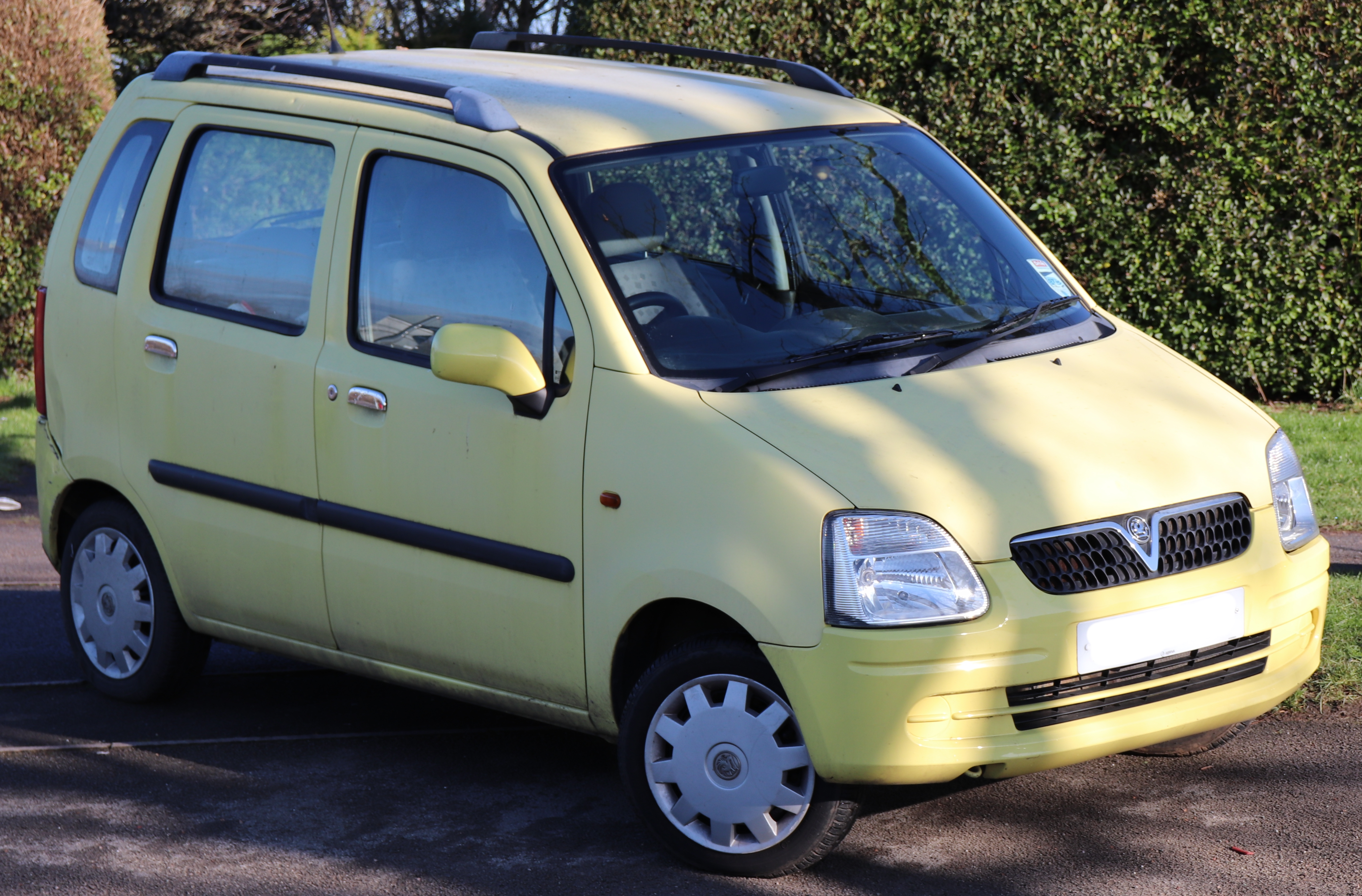

Overview
- Also called: Suzuki Wagon R+ Vauxhall Agila; Suzuki Wagon Solio (Japan); Chevrolet MW (Japan)
- Production: 2000–2007
- Assembly: Poland: Gliwice (Opel Polska)
- Designer: Hideo Kodama

Body and chassis
- Body style: 5-door hatchback

Powertrain
- Engine: Petrol: 973 cc Z10XE I3; 998 cc Z10XEP TwinPort I3; 1199 cc Z12XE I4; 1229 cc Z12XEP TwinPort I4; Diesel: 1248 cc Fiat Z13DT I4
- Transmission: 5-speed manual

Dimensions
- Wheelbase: 2,360 mm (92.9 in)
- Length: 3,535 mm (139.2 in)
- Width: 1,620 mm (63.8 in)
- Height: 1,660 mm (65.4 in)
- Curb weight: 993 kg (2,189 lb)

The first generation Agila is a rebadged version of the Suzuki Wagon R+, which was produced in Japan, and later given the "Solio" surname. The Agila's Opel sourced 1.0 and 1.2 litre petrol engines were smaller than the 1.3 litre found in the European market Wagon R+. The cam-chain Opel engines, as used in the Corsa, proved less reliable than the cambelt driven Suzuki unit. Sales began in August 2000.

The 1.0 engine was the Z10XE engine with three cylinders in line and 973 cc. The 1.2 engine was the Z12XE with four cylinders in line and 1199 cc. The Agila was built at Opel's factory in Gliwice, Poland. The Suzuki Wagon R+ for the European market was built at the Magyar Suzuki plant in Esztergom, Hungary. The facelift was launched in August 2003. This was also when the 1.25-liter diesel option was introduced. The petrol engines were also updated and now featured Opel's TwinPort technology as well as marginal displacement increases, although the updated 1.2-liter four-cylinder option did not arrive until January 2004.

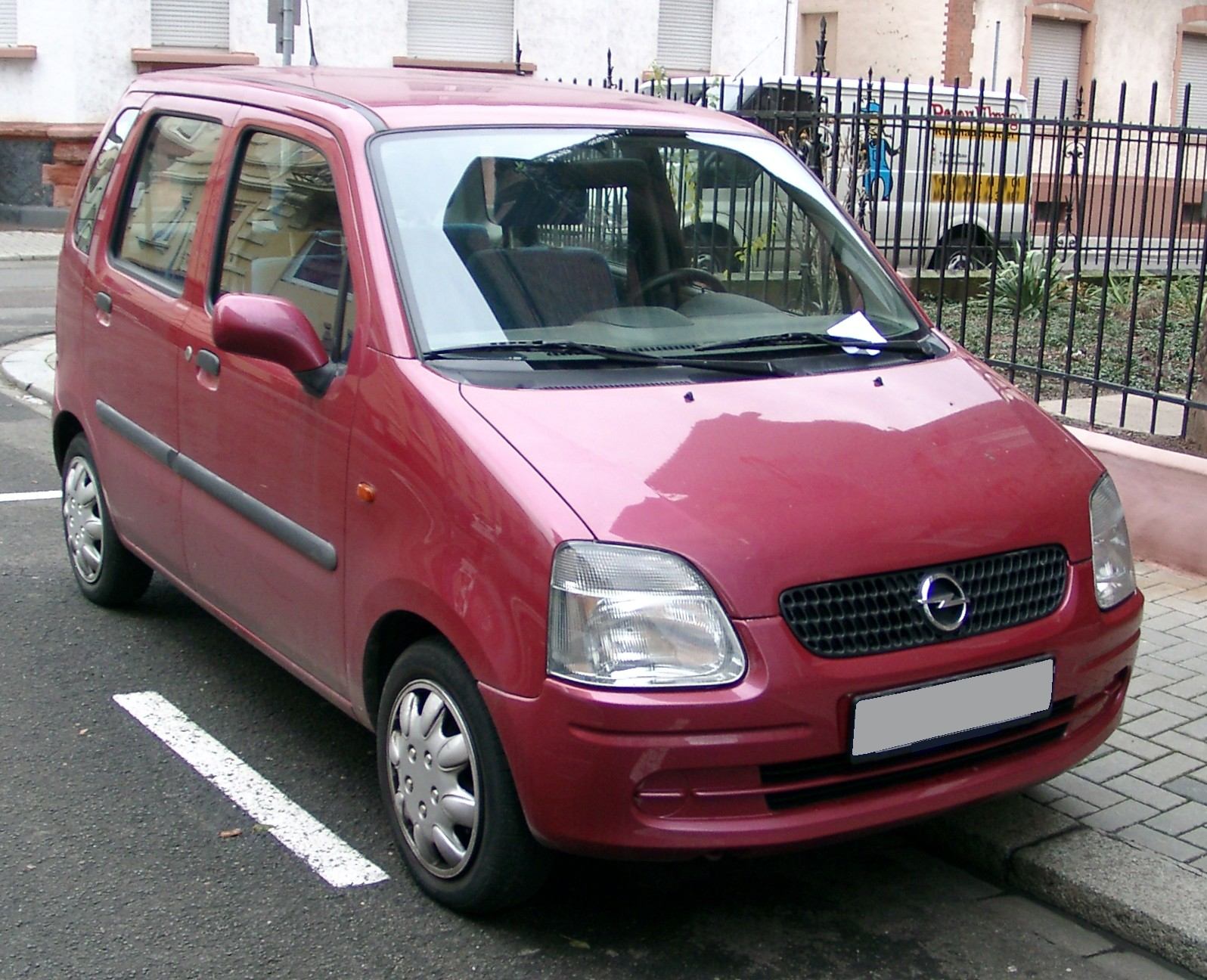
Opel Agila pre-facelift

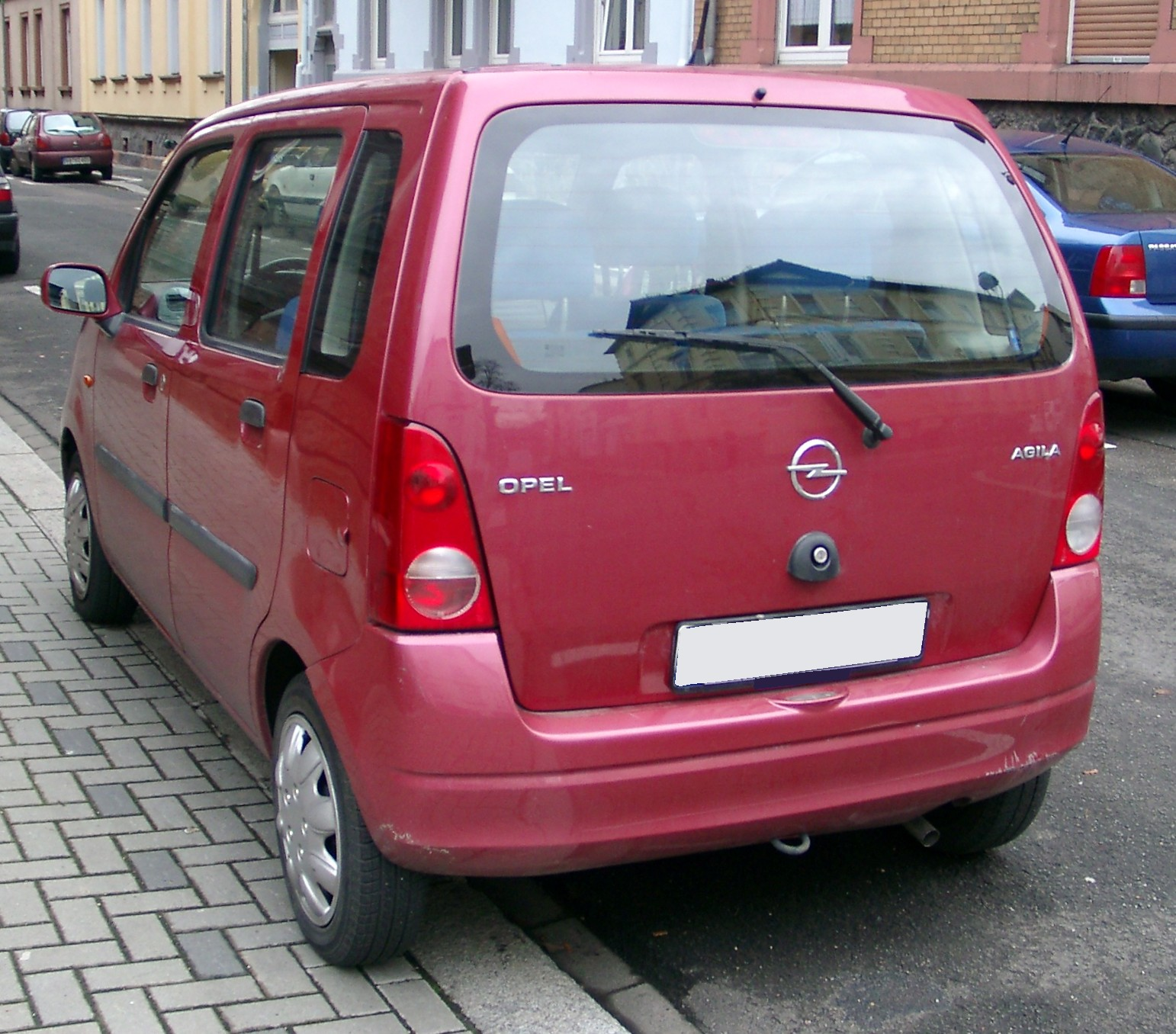
Rear view

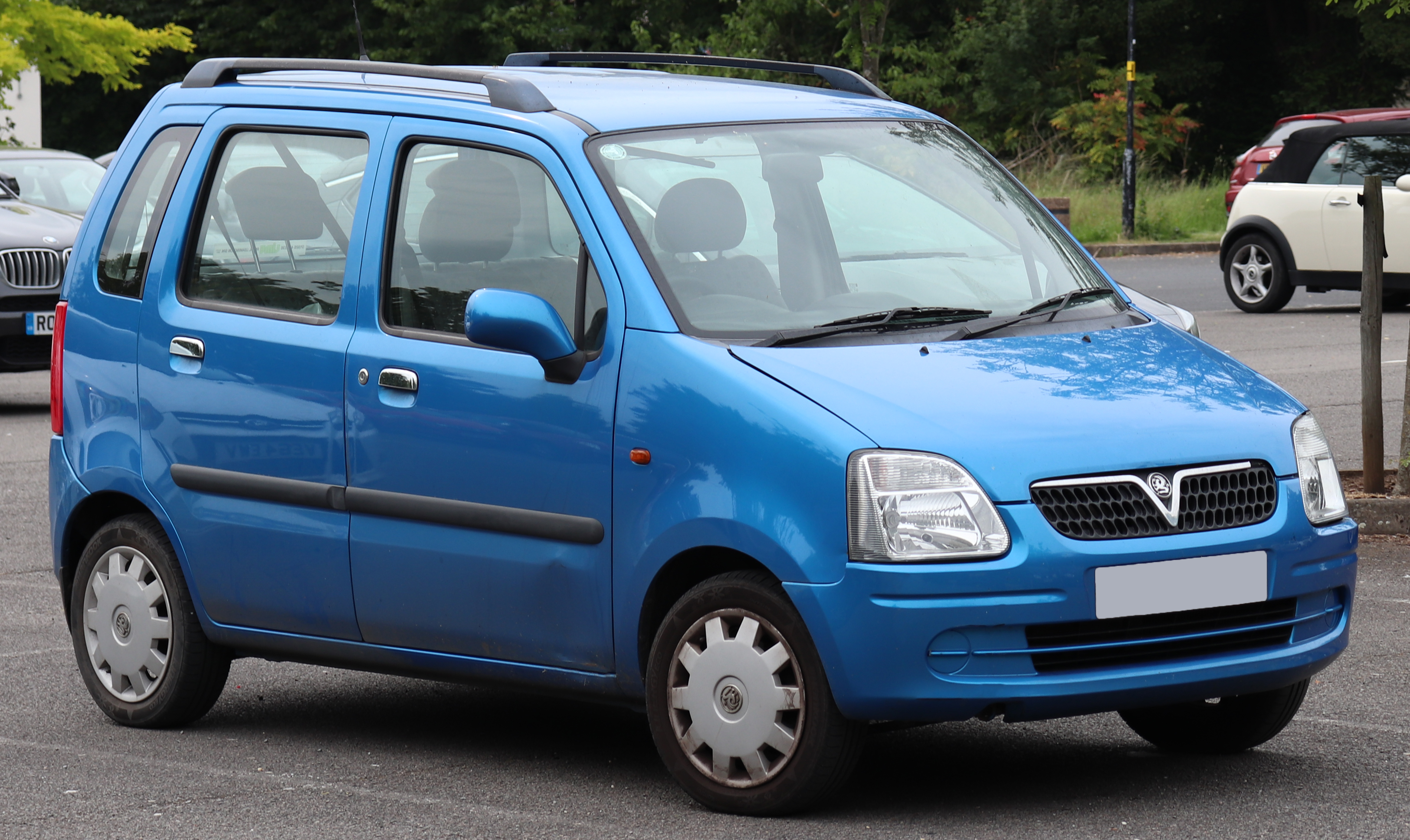
In the United Kingdom, the Agila was badged as a Vauxhall

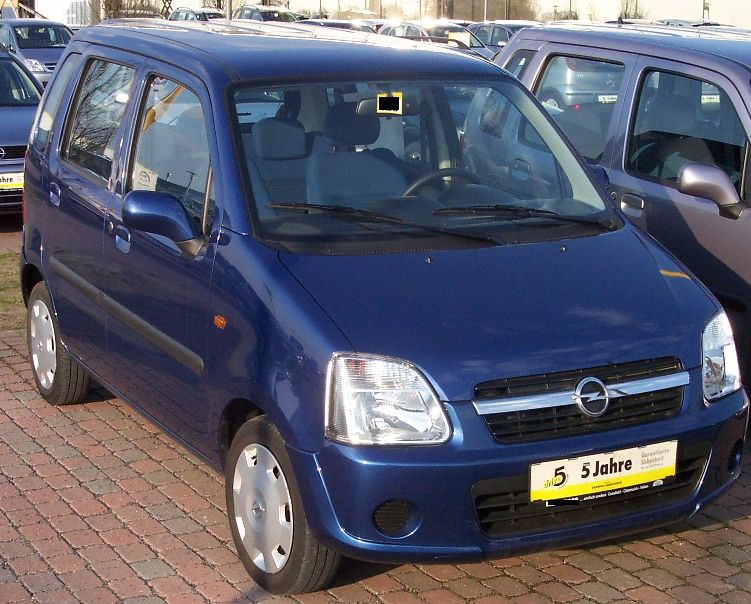
Opel Agila facelift

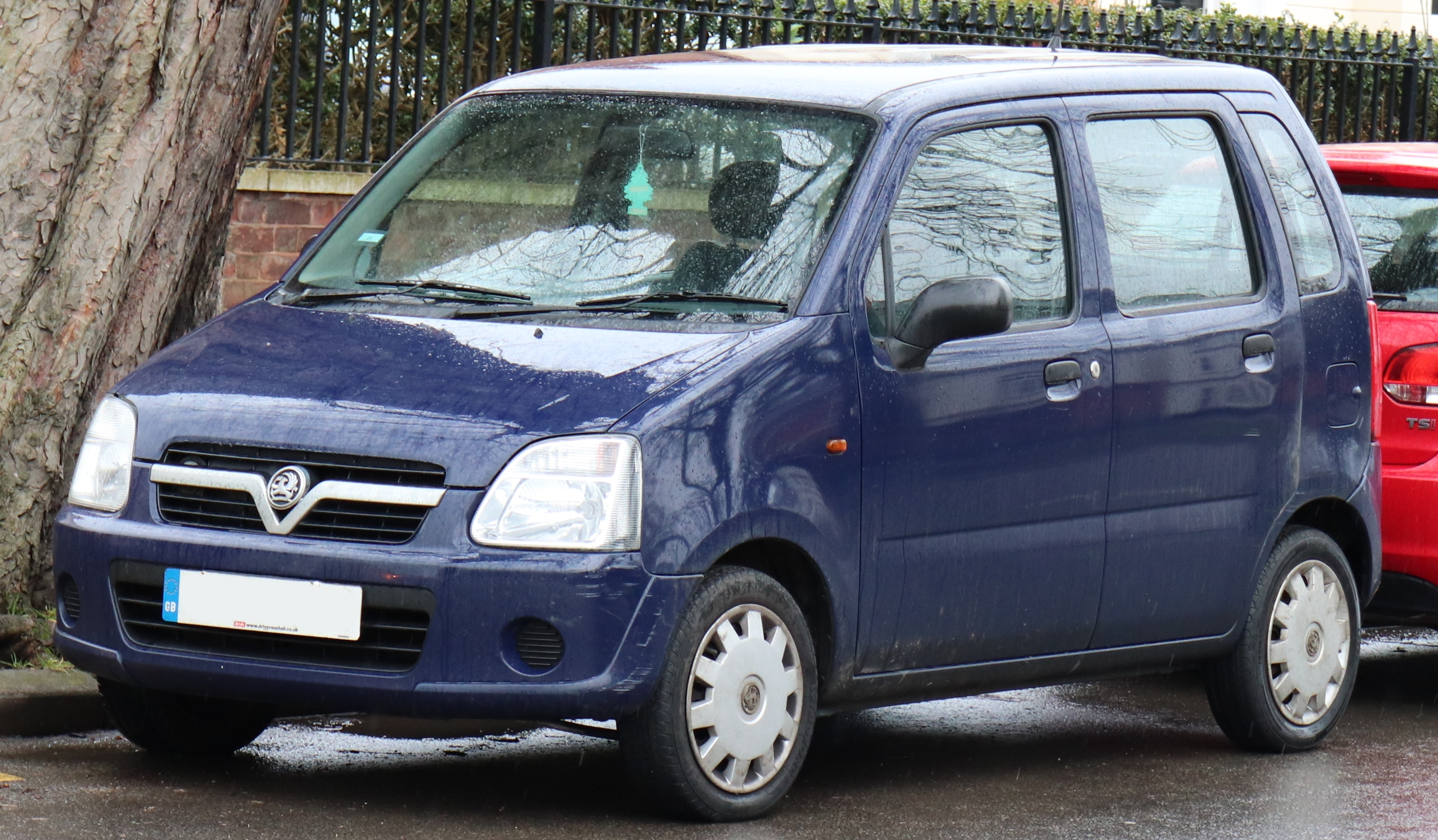
Vauxhall Agila facelift

== Second generation (H08; 2007) ==
Agila B
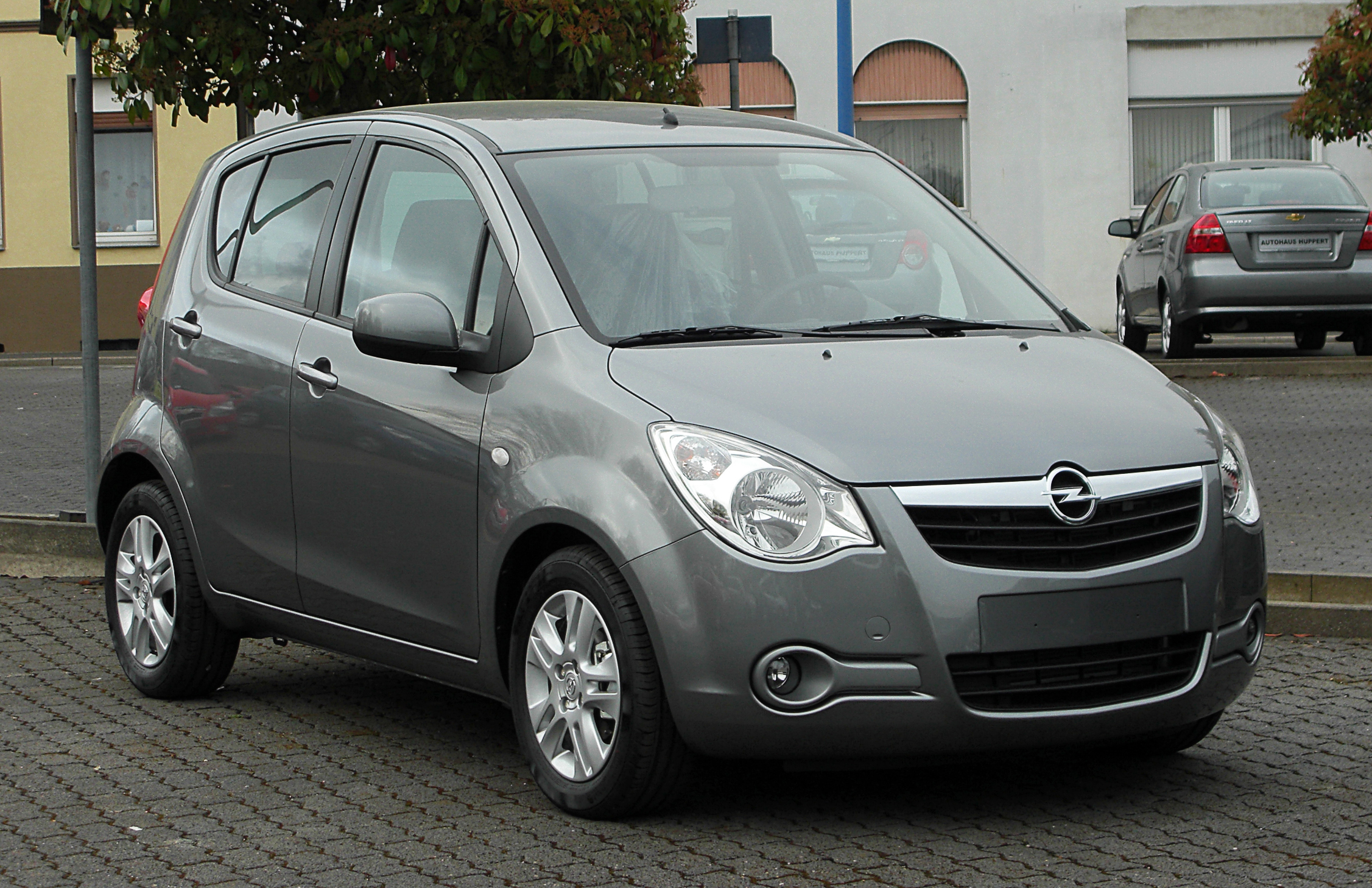

Overview
- Also called: Suzuki Splash; Chevrolet Spark; Daewoo Matiz; Vauxhall Agila; Maruti Ritz (India); Changhe Spla (China and South America)
- Production: 2007–2014
- Assembly: Hungary: Esztergom (Magyar Suzuki)

Body and chassis
- Body style: 5-door hatchback
- Related: Suzuki Swift (RS); Suzuki Splash; Chevrolet Spark; Daewoo Matiz

Powertrain
- Engine: Petrol: 1.0 L Suzuki K10B I3; 1.2 L Suzuki K12B I4; Diesel: 1.3 L Fiat Z13DT CDTi I4
- Transmission: 5-speed manual 4-speed automatic

Dimensions
- Wheelbase: 2,360 mm (92.9 in)
- Length: 3,740 mm (147.2 in)
- Width: 1,680 mm (66.1 in)
- Height: 1,590 mm (62.6 in)

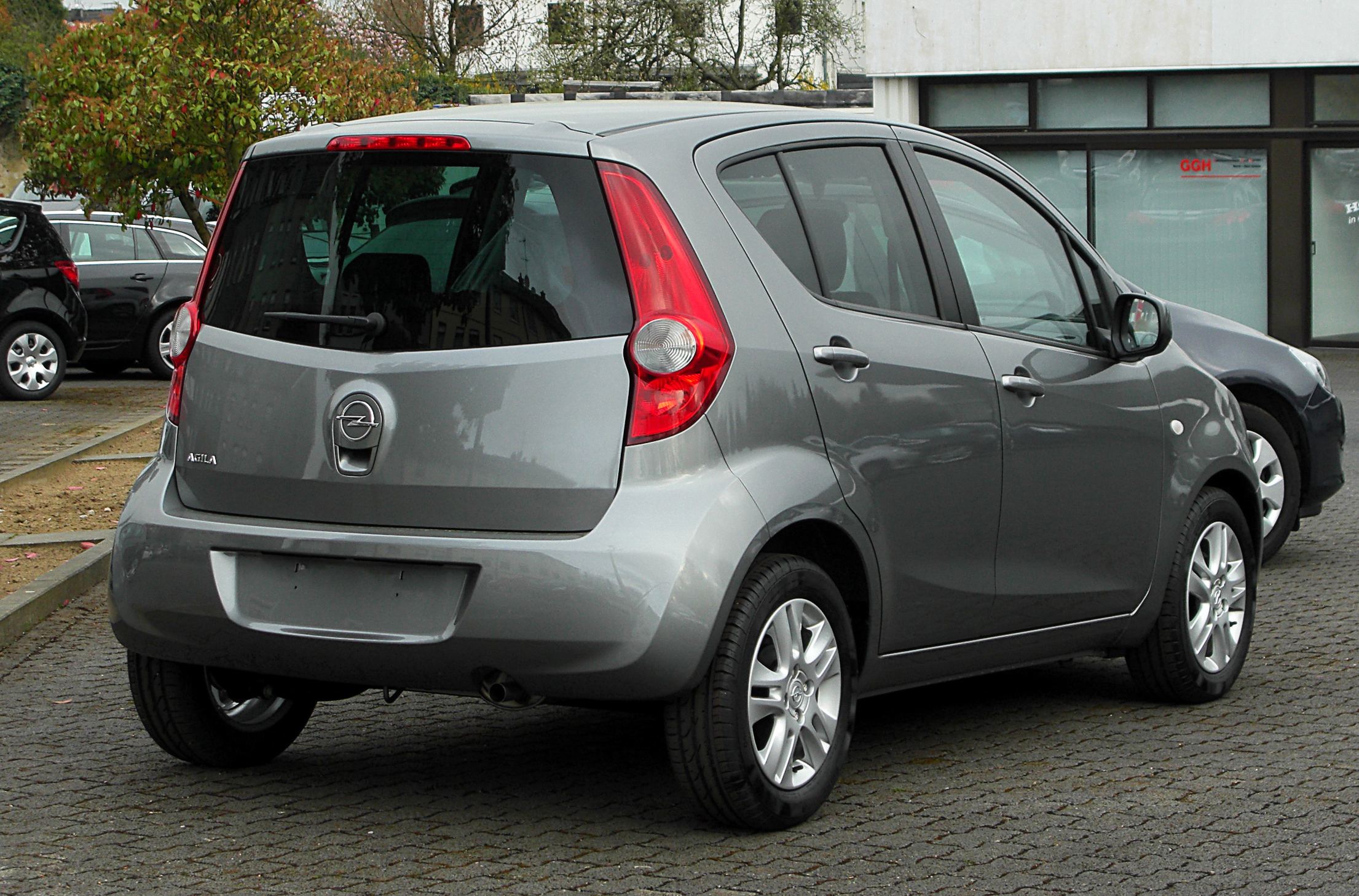
Rear view

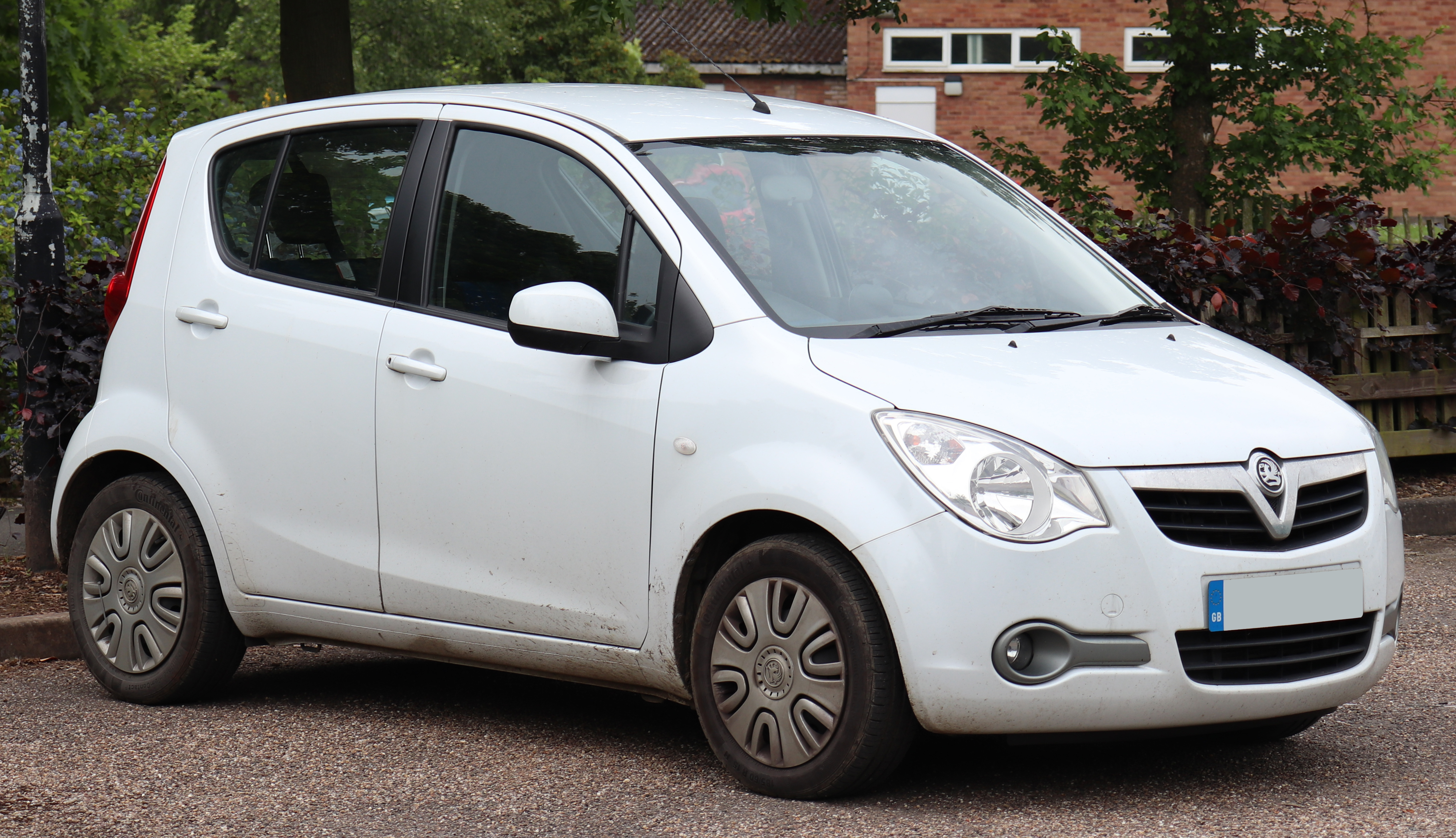
Vauxhall Agila

The second generation Agila was officially announced on 15 May 2007, and was presented at the 2007 Frankfurt Motor Show, as a rebadged variant of the Suzuki Splash.

The car was 200 mm (7.9 in) longer than its predecessor — similar to superminis and mini MPVs such as the Citroën C3 Picasso, Toyota Yaris, Honda Jazz and Nissan Micra. It was slightly larger in size than the previous generation, and was classified as a mini MPV. Sales began in April 2008.

Petrol engines were a three-cylinder 1.0 litre, 65 PS (48 kW; 64 bhp) and a four-cylinder 1.2 litre 86 PS (63 kW; 85 bhp), and the diesel unit a four-cylinder 1.2 litre CDTi 75 PS (55 kW; 74 bhp) with common rail technology. The Agila came in two different trim levels: Base/Essentia and Edition/Enjoy.

European production of the Opel Agila and Suzuki Splash took place at the Magyar Suzuki plant in Esztergom, Hungary. The car was replaced in March 2015 by the Opel Karl, known as the Vauxhall Viva in the United Kingdom.

=== Engines ===
All engines contain the 'Ecotec' technology.

Petrol engine
| Model | Engine | Displacement | Power | Torque | Note | CO_{2} emission (g/km) |
|---|---|---|---|---|---|---|
| 1.0 ecoFLEX | I3 | 973 cc | 65 PS (48 kW; 64 hp) at 6,000 rpm | 90 N⋅m (66 lb⋅ft) at 4,800 rpm | | 120 (2008–10) 119 (2010-) |
| 1.2 VVT | I4 | 1199 cc | 86 PS (63 kW; 85 hp) at 5,500 rpm | 114 N⋅m (84 lb⋅ft) at 4,400 rpm | | 131 (2008–10) 119 (2010-) |
Diesel engine
| Model | Engine | Displacement | Power | Torque | Note | CO_{2} emission (g/km) |
| 1.2 CDTI | I4 | 1248 cc | 70 PS (51 kW; 69 hp) at 4,000 rpm | 170 N⋅m (130 lb⋅ft) at 1,750 rpm | (2008–10) | 120 |
