= Fiat Sedici =

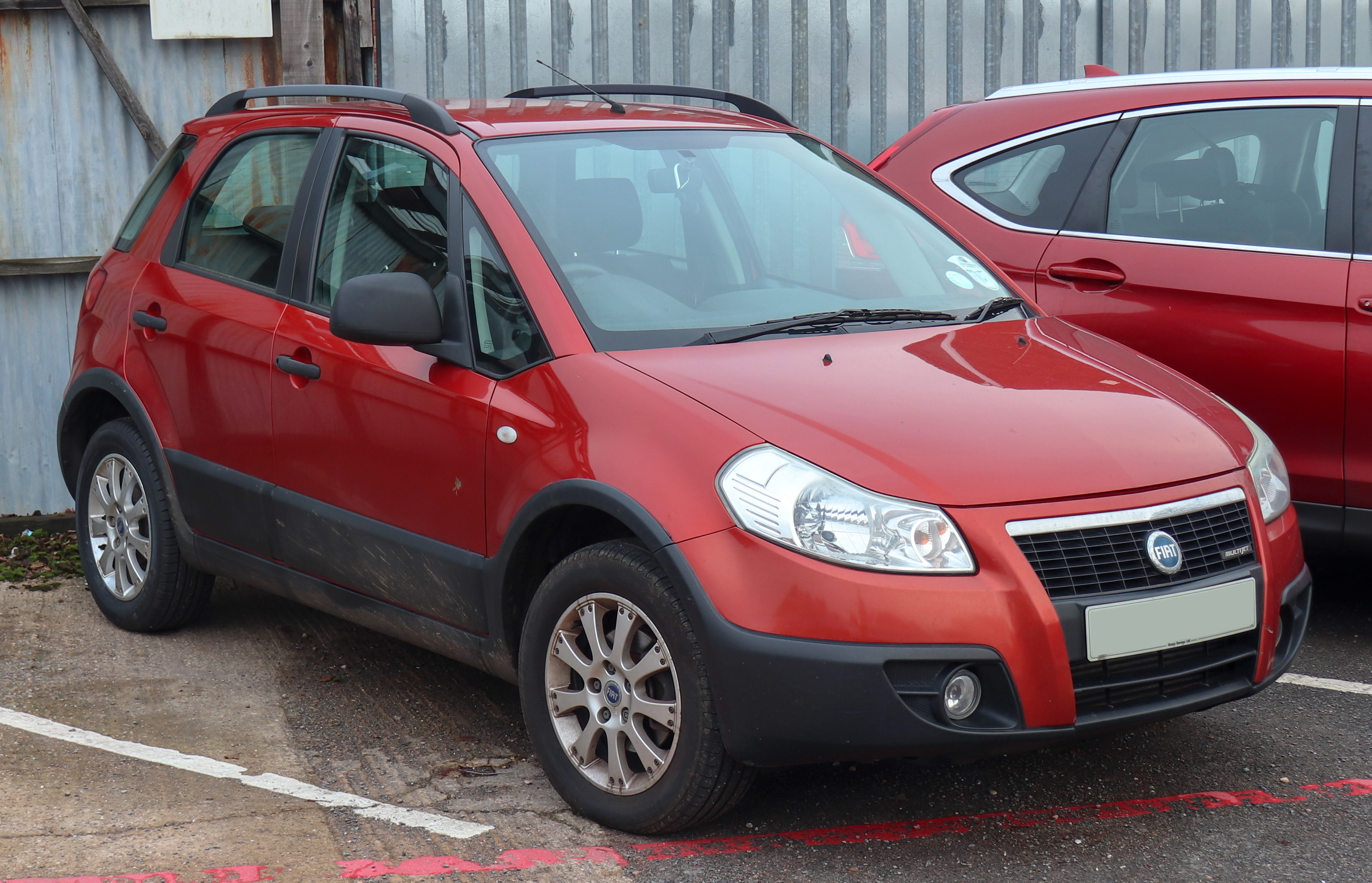

Overview
- Manufacturer: Suzuki
- Also called: Suzuki SX4
- Production: 2005–2014 (LHD); 2005–2010 (RHD)
- Assembly: Hungary: Esztergom (Magyar Suzuki)
- Designer: Giorgetto Giugiaro at Italdesign

Body and chassis
- Class: Subcompact crossover SUV (B)
- Body style: 5-door SUV
- Layout: Front engine, front-wheel drive / four-wheel drive

Powertrain
- Engine: petrol: 1.6 L M16A I4; diesel: 1.9 L Multijet I4; 2.0 L Multijet I4
- Transmission: 5-speed manual (petrol); 6-speed manual (diesel); 4-speed automatic

Dimensions
- Wheelbase: 2,500 mm (98.4 in)
- Length: 4,115 mm (162.0 in)
- Width: 1,730 mm (68.1 in)
- Height: 1,575 mm (62.0 in)
- Curb weight: 1,320–1,425 kg (2,910–3,142 lb)

Chronology
- Successor: Fiat 500X

The Fiat Sedici is a subcompact crossover SUV (B-segment) that was co-developed by Fiat and Suzuki, mainly for the market in Europe. Introduced in December 2005, it was manufactured until October 2014 (with the last model year being 2015). As 4x4 is 16, the car is named Sedici (Italian: [ˈseːditʃi]), which means "sixteen" in Italian.

== History ==
It was introduced in December 2005, at the Bologna Motor Show, and was built at the Magyar Suzuki plant in Hungary. The expected production volume was 60,000 units per year, one third of these to be sold by Fiat, and two thirds sold by Suzuki and badged as the SX4.

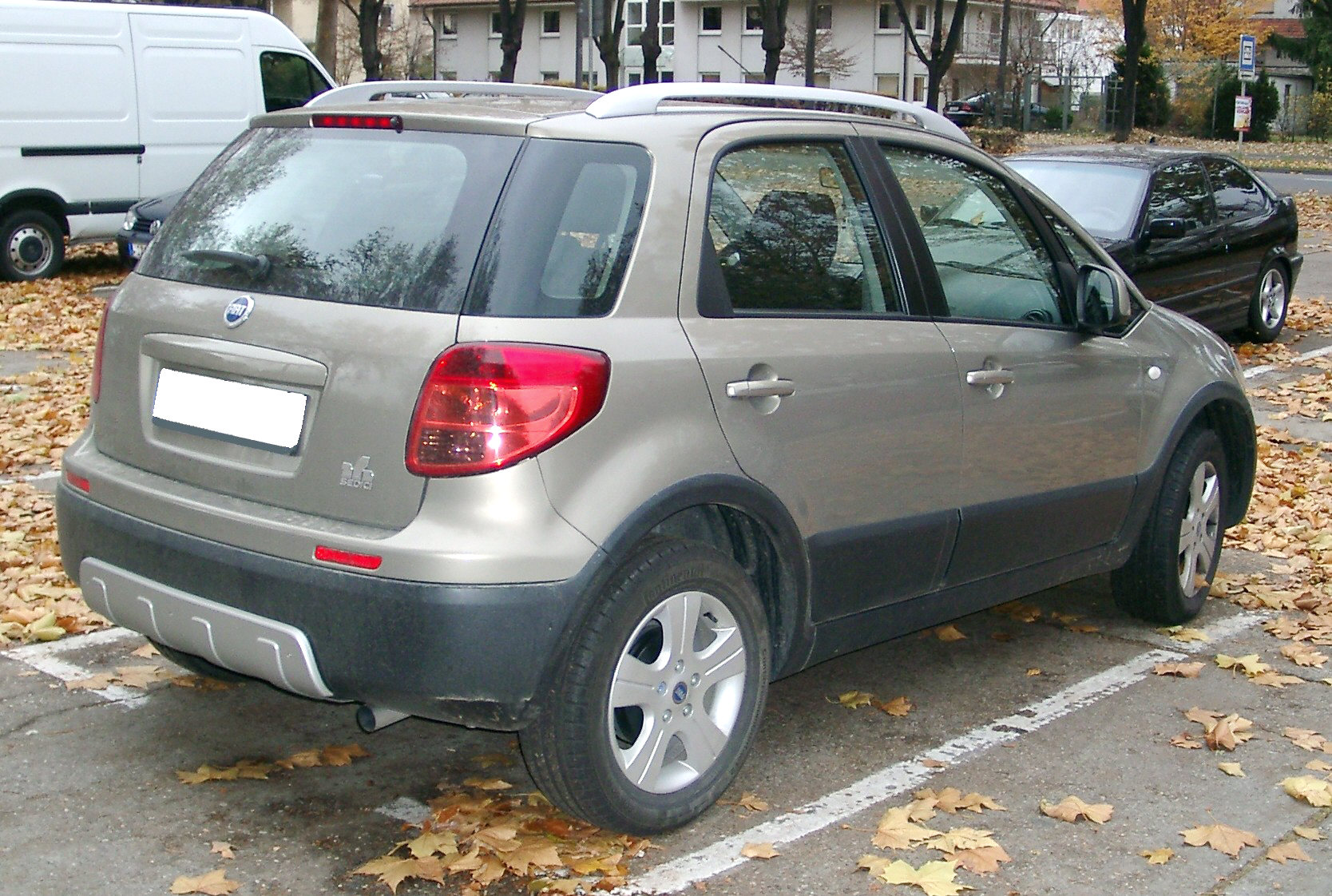
Fiat Sedici (pre-facelift)

The design was created by Giorgetto Giugiaro's Italdesign Giugiaro studio, and was an alternative to mini multi-purpose vehicles (MPV), which have a more "boxy" appearance. It was the official car of the 2006 Winter Olympics. As the car is four wheel drive, it could be considered a 4x4.

By flicking a switch, the driver can change between 4x2 and 4x4 transmission modes. The car also has electronic stability control (ESC) on the options list and a diesel particulate filter (DPF) is a standard feature.

It was the second best selling SUV in the market in Italy in November 2006, and by June 2007, it was the best selling such vehicle. Since 2012, the Sedici has been sold in Israel, with automatic (four speed) or manual (five speed) gearbox. During 2010, the Sedici was withdrawn from the United Kingdom, due to poor sales.

== Sedici 4x2 ==
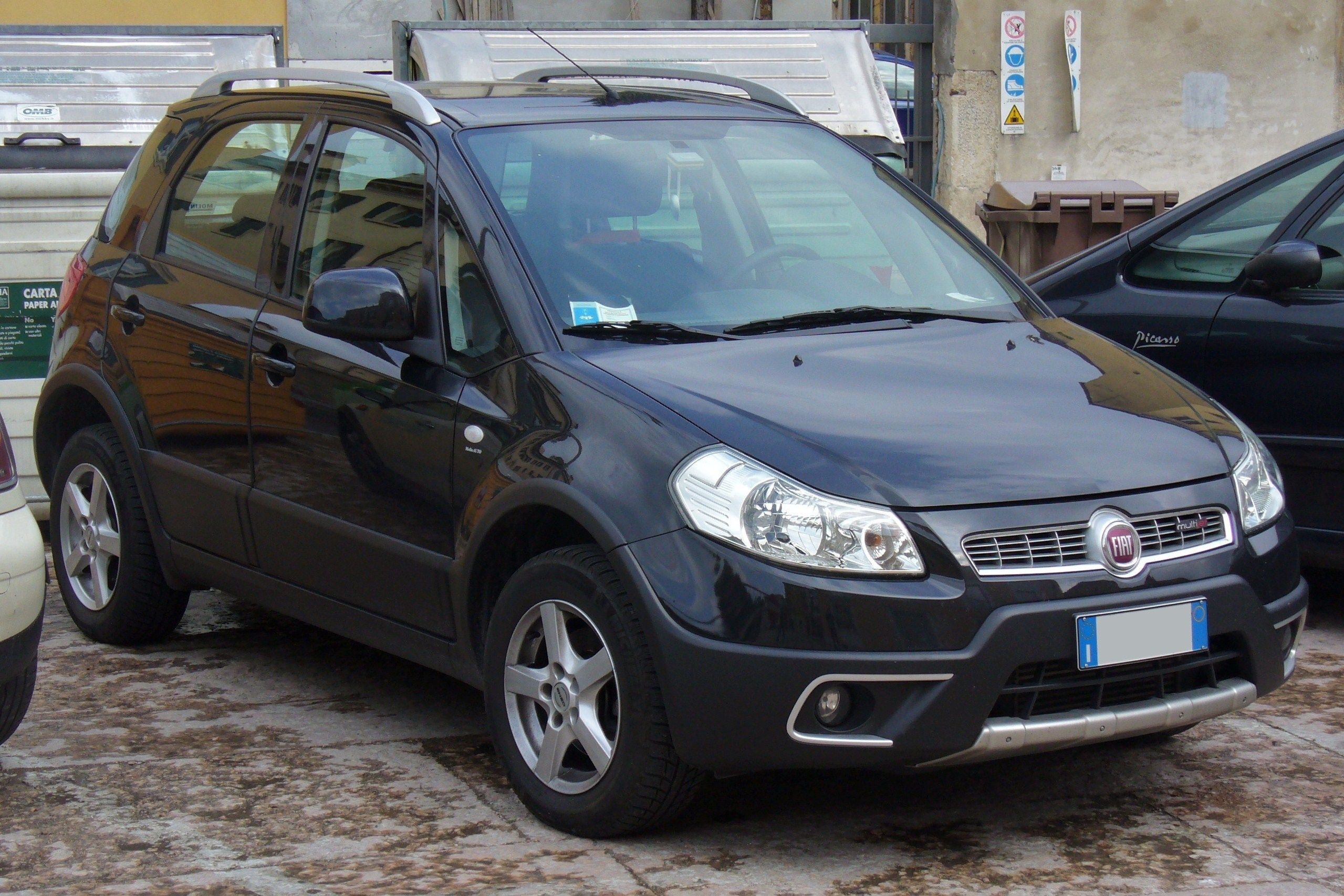
2009 Fiat Sedici (facelift)

The front wheel drive version of the Sedici was unveiled in May 2008. It was available with the same engine choices as the 4X4 version and was available in two trim levels: Dynamic and Emotion. The price, in Italy, was around €2000 cheaper than the 4x4 version.

=== Engines ===
There were two engines available: a 1.6 L Suzuki petrol and a 1.9 L Fiat turbodiesel.

Model	Engine	Displacement	Power	Torque	Top speed
1.6 Petrol	I4	1586 cc	79 kW; 106 hp (107 PS) @5600 rpm	145 N⋅m (107 lb⋅ft) @4000 rpm	4WD: 170 km/h (106 mph)
1.9 Multijet Diesel	I4	1910 cc	88 kW; 118 hp (120 PS) @4000 rpm	280 N⋅m (207 lb⋅ft) @2050 rpm	4WD: 180 km/h (112 mph)

== Facelift (2009) ==
In March 2009, the Sedici was given a more substantial upgrade: A changed front grille, similar to that of the Bravo, and a new bumper. Inside, it had more sophisticated instrumentation, new fabrics, the air conditioning vents were changed, and it had new Euro 5 compliant engines.

The 1.9 litre Multijet engine was replaced by the more modern 2.0 litre Multijet engine producing 99 kW; 133 hp (135 PS), also the petrol 1.6 litre engine was upgraded to have 88 kW; 118 hp (120 PS), with lower fuel consumption. This coincided with the withdrawal of sales of the Sedici in the United Kingdom, although a handful of facelifted cars were sold there.

Model	Engine	Displacement	Power	Torque	Top speed
1.6 Petrol	I4	1586 cc	88 kW; 118 hp (120 PS) @6000 rpm	156 N⋅m (115 lb⋅ft) @4400 rpm	FWD: 185 km/h (115 mph); 4WD: 175 km/h (109 mph)
2.0 16V Diesel Multijet DPF	I4	1956 cc	99 kW; 133 hp (135 PS) @3500 rpm	320 N⋅m (236 lbf⋅ft) @1500 rpm	FWD: 190 km/h (118 mph); 4WD: 180 km/h (112 mph)

== Total production ==
Calendar Year	Production
2012	8,683
2011	14,777
2010	16,505
2009	19,315
2008	30,952
2007	34,522
2006	24,943
2005	350
