= Magyar Suzuki =

Automotive Manufacturing Plant

Coordinates: 47°46′01″N 18°45′01″E

Magyar Suzuki Corporation
- Type: Private (subsidiary)
- Industry: Automotive, marine (outboard engines), motorcycles
- Founded: 1991; 35 years ago
- Headquarters: 2500 Esztergom, Schweidel József u. 52, Hungary
- Area served: Europe
- Key people: Masato Atsumi (CEO)
- Products: Automobiles
- Production output: 111,492 cars (2024)
- Revenue: 2,245.6 million euro (US$2,638.6 million) (2024)
- Net income: 77,500,000 euro ($91,043,125) (2018)
- Number of employees: 2,858 (2024)
- Parent: Suzuki Motor Corporation (97.53%); ITOCHU Corporation (2.46%); Hungarian shareholders (0.01%)
- Website: www.suzuki.hu

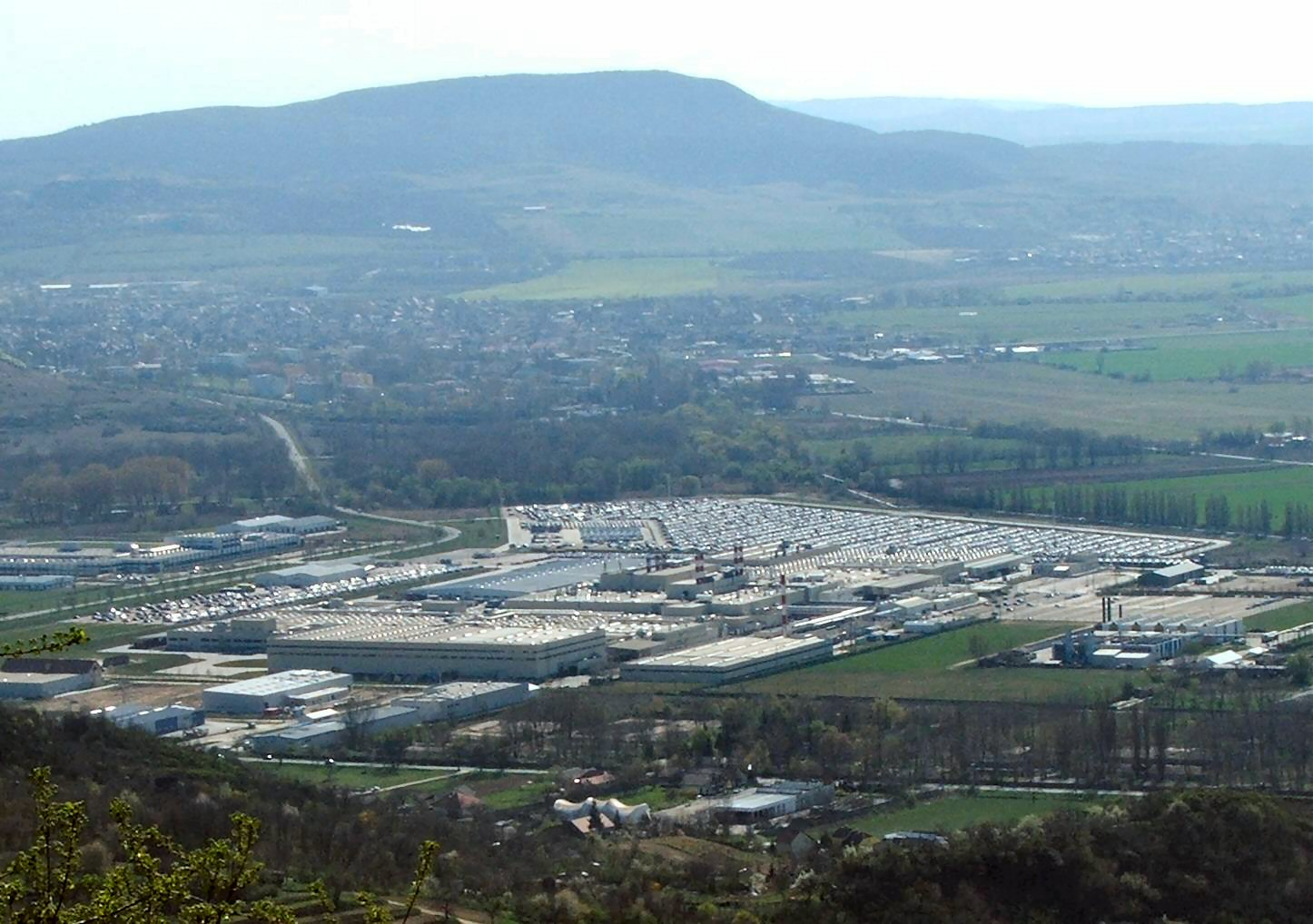
Magyar Suzuki in Esztergom, Hungary, had over 2,858 employees as of 2024

Magyar Suzuki Corporation is an automobile manufacturing plant, subsidiary of Suzuki, located in Esztergom, Hungary and founded in 1991 with investments from Suzuki Japan, the Government of Hungary, Itochu and the World Bank.

== History ==
Magyar Suzuki Corporation started production in October 1992.

Through the end of September 2005, the plant had a cumulative production volume of 849,000 vehicles: 465,000 Suzuki Swift through March 2003, 187,000 Suzuki Wagon R+, 137,000 Suzuki Ignis and 60,000 Suzuki Swift (previous model, based on the Suzuki Cultus). In addition to the Suzuki-badged vehicles, the Hungarian plant also produced 24,943 Fiat Sedici CUVs and 4,494 Ignis-based Subaru G3X Justys. Current production capacity is 300,000 units/year. The plant also produced the Suzuki Splash, as well as a rebadged version, the Opel Agila.

Constructed with an investment of 14 billion Hungarian forints, the plant initially produced 1.0-litre and 1.3-litre Suzuki Swifts, reaching the ten thousandth car in 1993.

The plant meets ISO 14001 quality levels, engines manufactured at the plant meet Euro 4 requirements, and Suzuki requires ISO 9001:2000 quality assurance certification from suppliers and dealerships. Magyar Suzuki's VIN identifier (the first three digits of the chassis number) is TSM.

=== Milestones ===
Former logo used until 2025

On 6 October 2006, the plant produced its one millionth car, a five-door second generation Suzuki Swift. Total production reached 2 million in July 2011, 3 million in April 2017 and 4 million in February 2024.

== Current production ==
- Suzuki SX4 S-Cross (2006–present) - First, second and third generation models
- Suzuki Vitara (2015–present) - Fourth generation model

== Former production ==
- Suzuki Swift (1992–2003) – The first generation model, based on the Suzuki Cultus. It was also badged as the Subaru Justy.
- Suzuki Wagon R+ (2000–2007) – A rebadged version was produced in Poland, as the Opel Agila.
- Suzuki Ignis (2003–2008) – Also badged as the Subaru G3X Justy.
- Suzuki Swift (2005–2010) – The second generation model.
- Suzuki SX4 (2006–2014) – Also badged as the Fiat Sedici.
- Suzuki Splash (2008–2014) – Also badged as the Opel Agila.
- Suzuki Swift (2010–2016) – The third generation model.
