= Puttin' On the Ritz (disambiguation) =

"Puttin' On the Ritz" is a song written by Irving Berlin.

Puttin' On the Ritz may also refer to:

- Puttin' On the Ritz (film), a 1930 musical film
- Putting on the Ritz (novel), a 1991 book by novelist Joe Keenan
- A 1962 episode of the British sitcom Hugh and I
