= Ritz Metro =

Biscuit

A Ritz Metro Packet

Ritz Metro is a biscuit launched in 2007 by Kraft Foods, now Mondelez International.
