= Ritz Cinema =

Ritz Cinema may refer to:

- Ritz Cinema, Barrow-in-Furness, Cumbria, England
- Ritz Cinema, Harringay, London, England
- Ritz Cinema, Thirsk, North Yorkshire, England
- Ritz Cinema, Nuneaton, Warwickshire, England
- Ritz Cinema, Randwick, Sydney, Australia

== See also ==
- Ritz Theatre (disambiguation)
- Ritzy Cinema, Brixton, London
