= Suzuki Splash =

City car

Suzuki Splash (XB/EX)
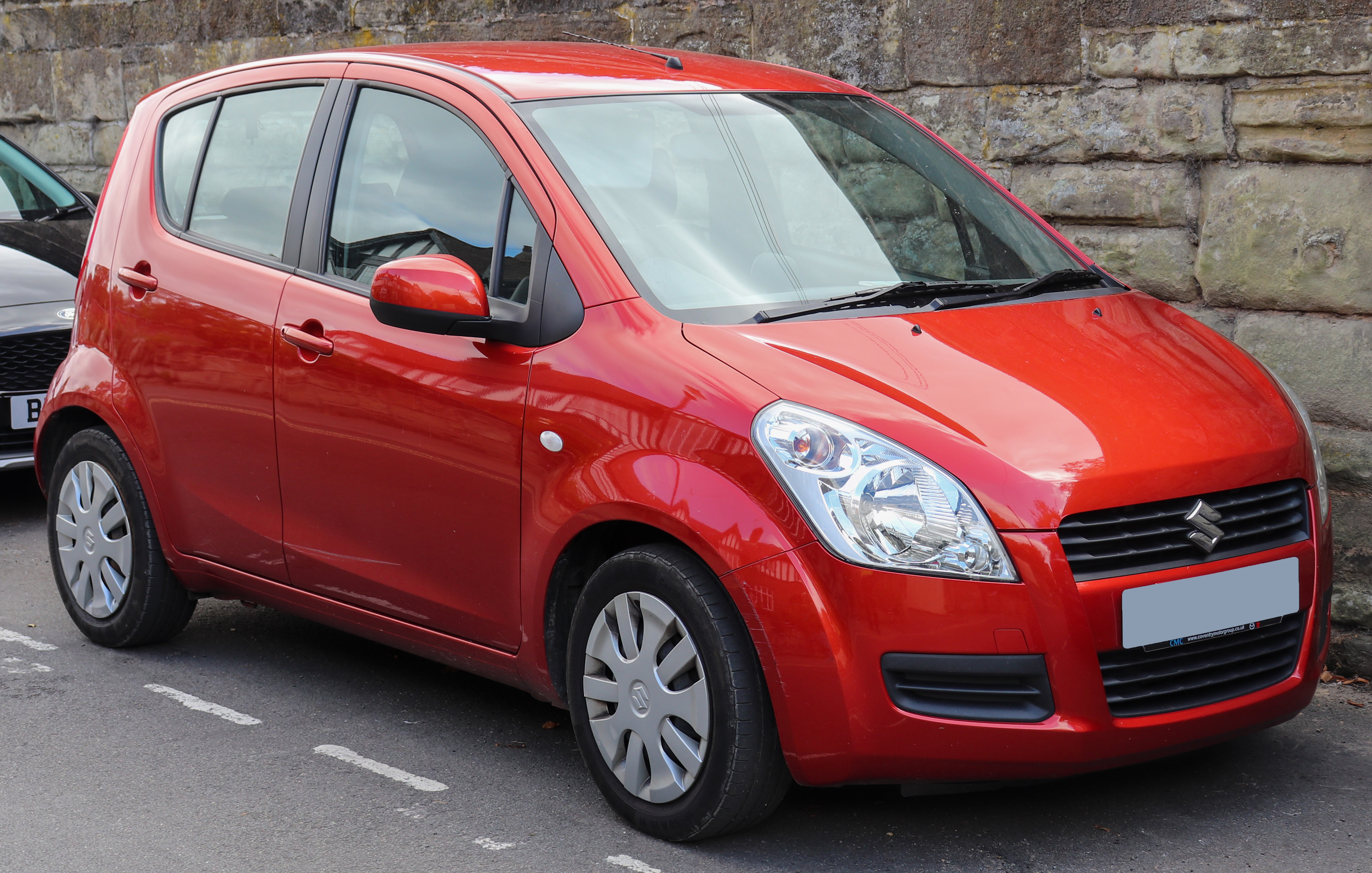
- Pre-facelift model

Overview
- Manufacturer: Suzuki
- Also called: Opel Agila B (Europe); Vauxhall Agila (United Kingdom); Maruti Suzuki Ritz (India); Changhe Spla (China/South America)
- Production: 2008–2014 (Hungary); 2009–2016 (India); 2010–2018 (China)
- Assembly: Hungary: Esztergom (Magyar Suzuki); India: Manesar (Maruti Suzuki); China: Jingdezhen (Changhe Suzuki)
- Designer: Takashi Miyazawa

Body and chassis
- Class: City car (A)
- Body style: 5-door hatchback
- Layout: Front-engine, front-wheel-drive
- Related: Suzuki Swift (RS); Opel Agila B Chevrolet Spark

Powertrain
- Engine: Petrol; 1.0 L K10B I3; 1.2 L K12M I4 (India/Indonesia); 1.2 L K12B I4; 1.4 L K14B I4 (China/South America); Diesel: 1.3 L D13A I4-TD (Europe/India)
- Transmission: 5-speed manual; 4-speed automatic; CVT

Dimensions
- Wheelbase: 2,360 mm (92.9 in)
- Length: 3,720 mm (146.5 in)
- Width: 1,680 mm (66.1 in)
- Height: 1,590 mm (62.6 in)
- Curb weight: 975–1,050 kg (2,149.5–2,314.9 lb)

Chronology
- Predecessor: Suzuki Wagon R+ (Europe)
- Successor: Suzuki Ignis; Suzuki Solio (Japan)

The Suzuki Splash is a city car that was introduced to the market in 2008. It was jointly developed by Suzuki Motor Corporation and Opel GmbH, which marketed their version under the name of Agila. Its debut as a concept car took place at the 2006 Paris Motor Show, making its production form debut at the 2007 Frankfurt Motor Show.

== Markets ==
=== Europe ===
In the European market lineup, the Splash was positioned below the Swift and used a shortened wheelbase version of its chassis. In the Japanese market lineup, however, the car was situated between the Swift and the Suzuki Solio. The model was launched with three versions of petrol engines, a three-cylinder 1.0 liter and two four-cylinder 1.2 liter (1197 cc and 1242 cc) K engines, and a four-cylinder 1.3-liter version of Fiat's MultiJet turbo-diesel engine. The Splash was also marketed as the Vauxhall Agila in the United Kingdom and as the Opel Agila in other European markets. It has different front and rear end styling.

=== Japan ===
The Splash was introduced to the Japanese market on 20 October 2008, available with the 1.2-litre engine.

=== India ===
Maruti Suzuki released the Splash in India as Maruti Suzuki Ritz. Maruti Suzuki changed its name because the name "Splash" was already registered by Ford in that market. More than 200,000 Ritz were sold within the first 37 months of release.

In India, the Maruti Ritz is available in ten specifications; five equipment levels with either petrol or diesel engine options. The petrol variants are powered by Suzuki's 1.2 liter (1197 cc) K12M petrol engine. This light weight all aluminum engine delivers 85 PS (63 kW; 84 hp) of maximum power at 6000 rpm with 113 N⋅m (83 lb⋅ft) of maximum torque at 4000 rpm. The mileage it delivers on city roads is around 14.5 km/L, and 18 km/L on highways. The diesel variants of Maruti Ritz are powered by Fiat's 1.3-liter Multijet turbodiesel engine. This engine delivers 75 PS (55 kW; 74 hp) power of 4000 rpm with 190 N⋅m (140 lb⋅ft) of torque of 2000 rpm. The mileage it delivers is 17.7 km/L in the city and on the highway: 21 km/L.

A refreshed Ritz was launched in India in 2012. This version sports a new ZDI variant, three new colors, and improved fuel efficiency.

The Maruti Suzuki Ritz 2015 model was launched with a redesigned trim. The technical specifications remain unchanged. As part of the upgrades the vehicle received a new front fascia with a new grille, headlamps and bumpers. The vehicle is also sports new optional alloy wheels, new seat upholstery, and a new infotainment system.

=== Others ===
In Indonesia, the Splash was launched on 21 March 2010 and it was imported from India. It was initially offered only with manual transmission. The facelifted Splash was launched in the country on 27 April 2013 and also offered with automatic transmission. Sales ended in 2016.

In China, it was released by Changhe Suzuki towards the end of 2010. it was continued to available as Changhe Spla with 1.4-liter petrol engine until 2018 and this car was also offered in South American market. The Splash also went on sale in New Zealand in 2011.

== Discontinuation ==
The Splash was discontinued in Europe at the end of 2014. It was replaced by the second generation Ignis in early 2016. The Splash was also discontinued in Indonesia in June 2016, while the Ritz was discontinued in India in February 2017.

== Safety ==
ANCAP test results Suzuki Splash New Zealand variants (2011)
Test	Score
Overall	4 /5 stars
Frontal offset	13.10/16
Side impact	15.50/16
Pole	Not Assessed
Seat belt reminders	1/3
Whiplash protection	Not Assessed
Pedestrian protection	Adequate
Electronic stability control	Standard

== Gallery ==
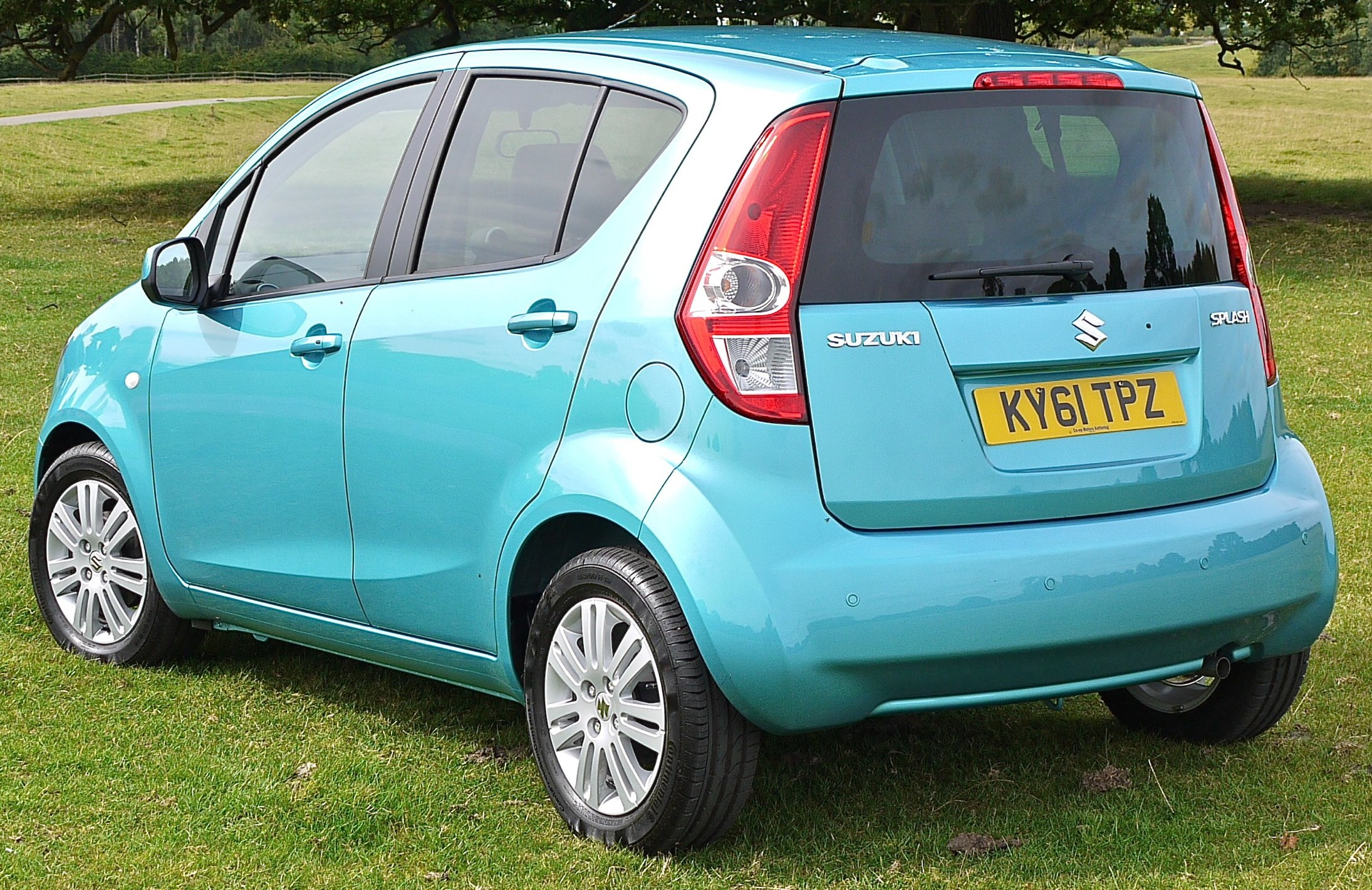
Pre-facelift

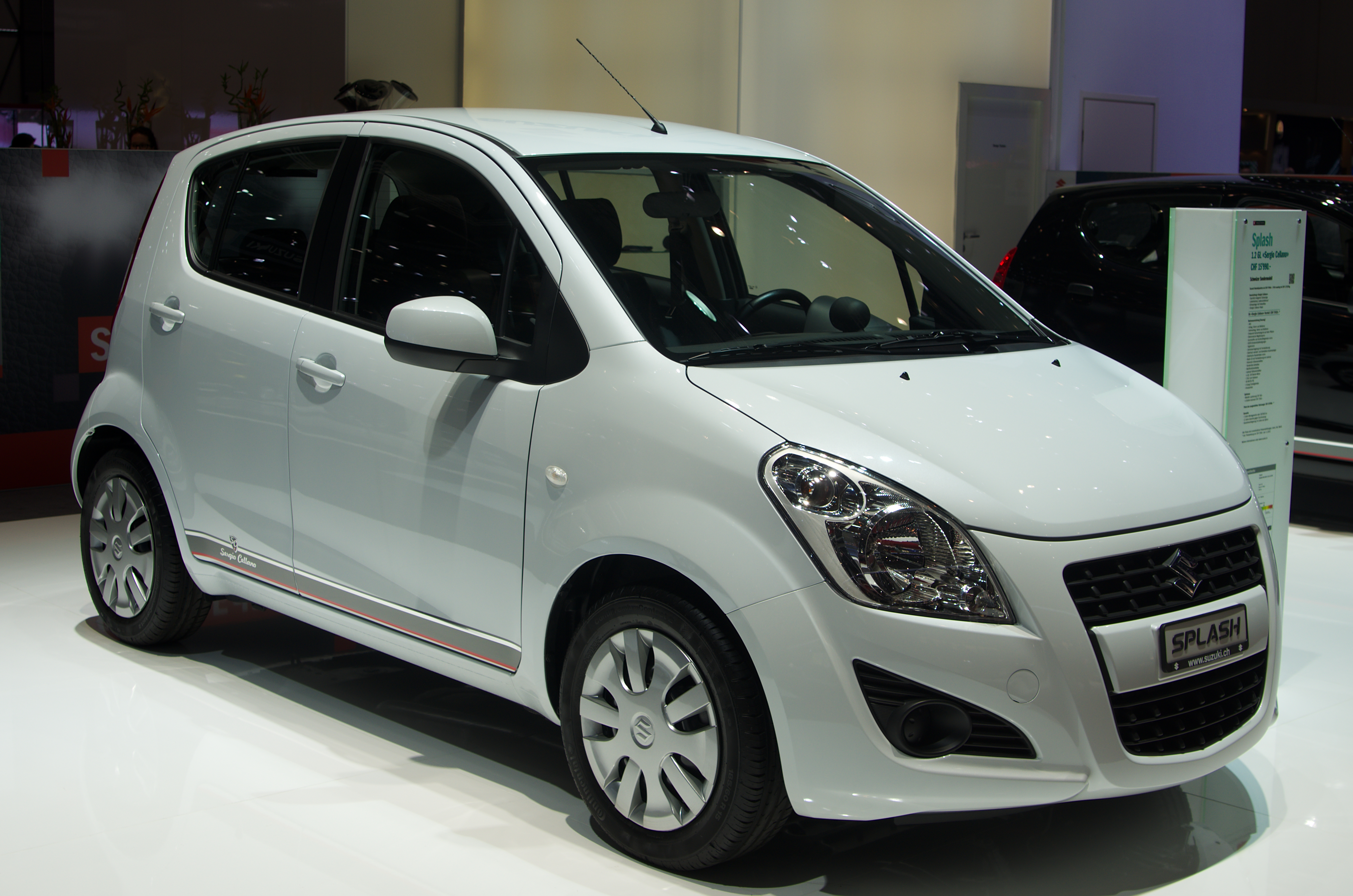
2013 facelift

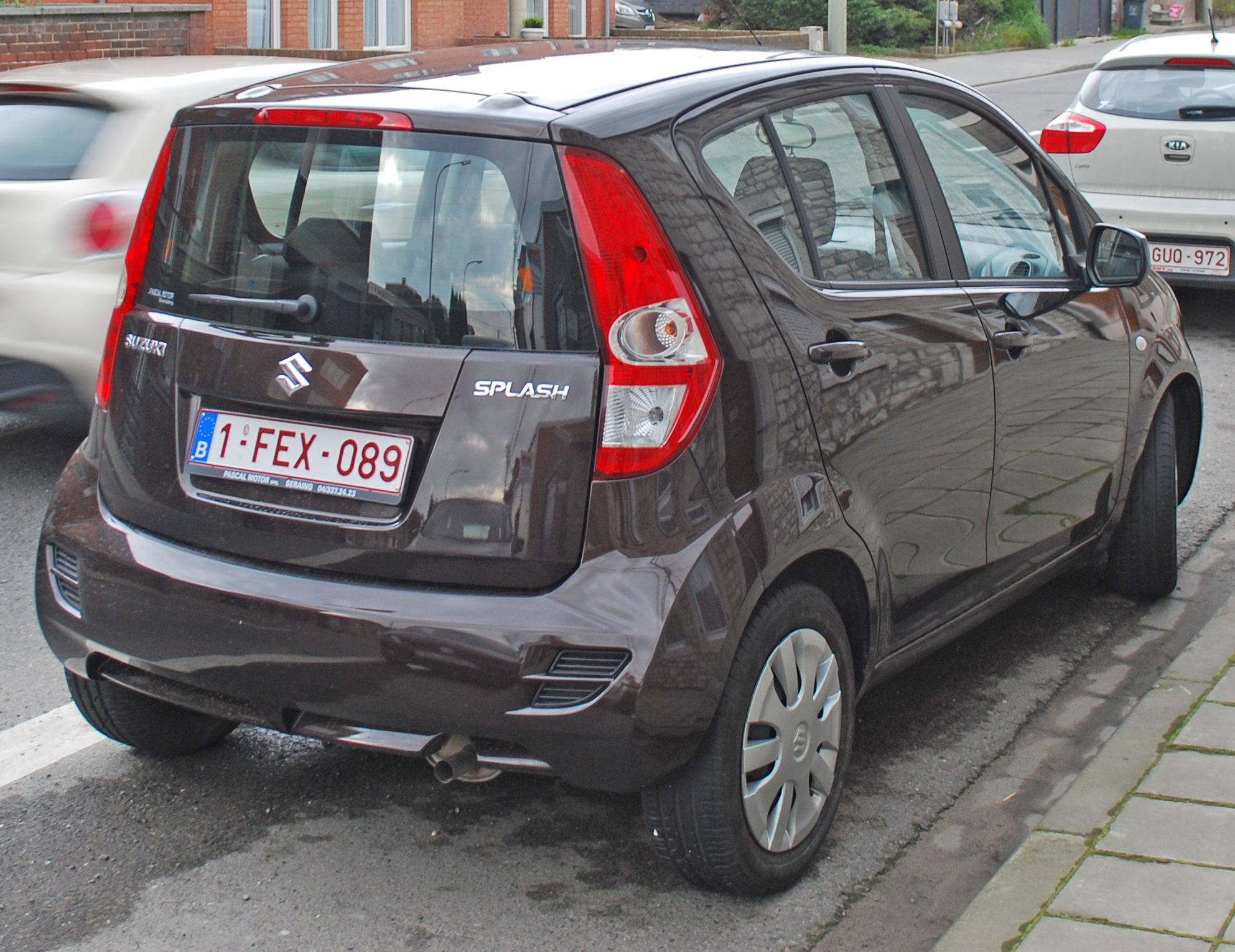
2013 facelift

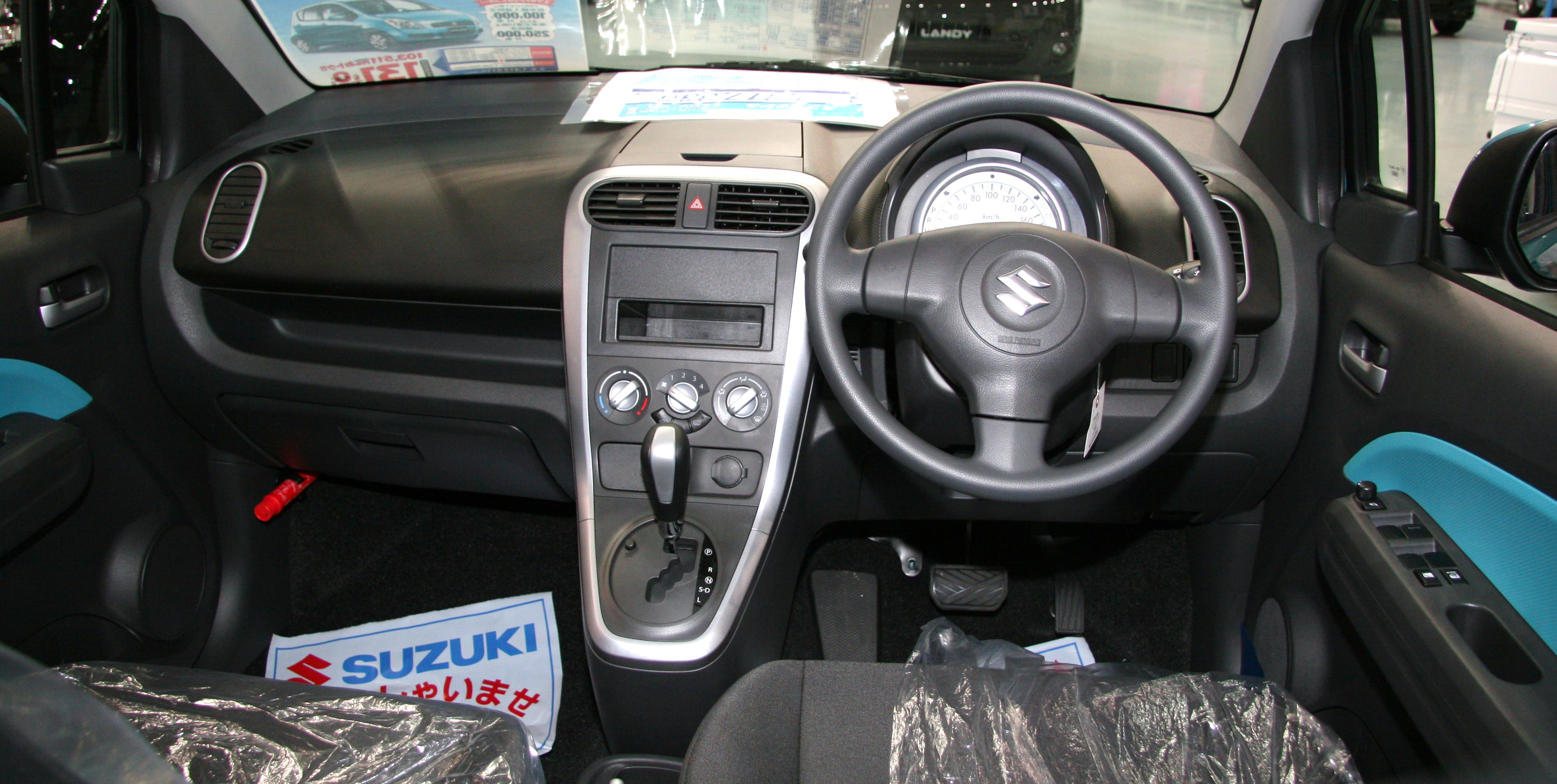
Interior

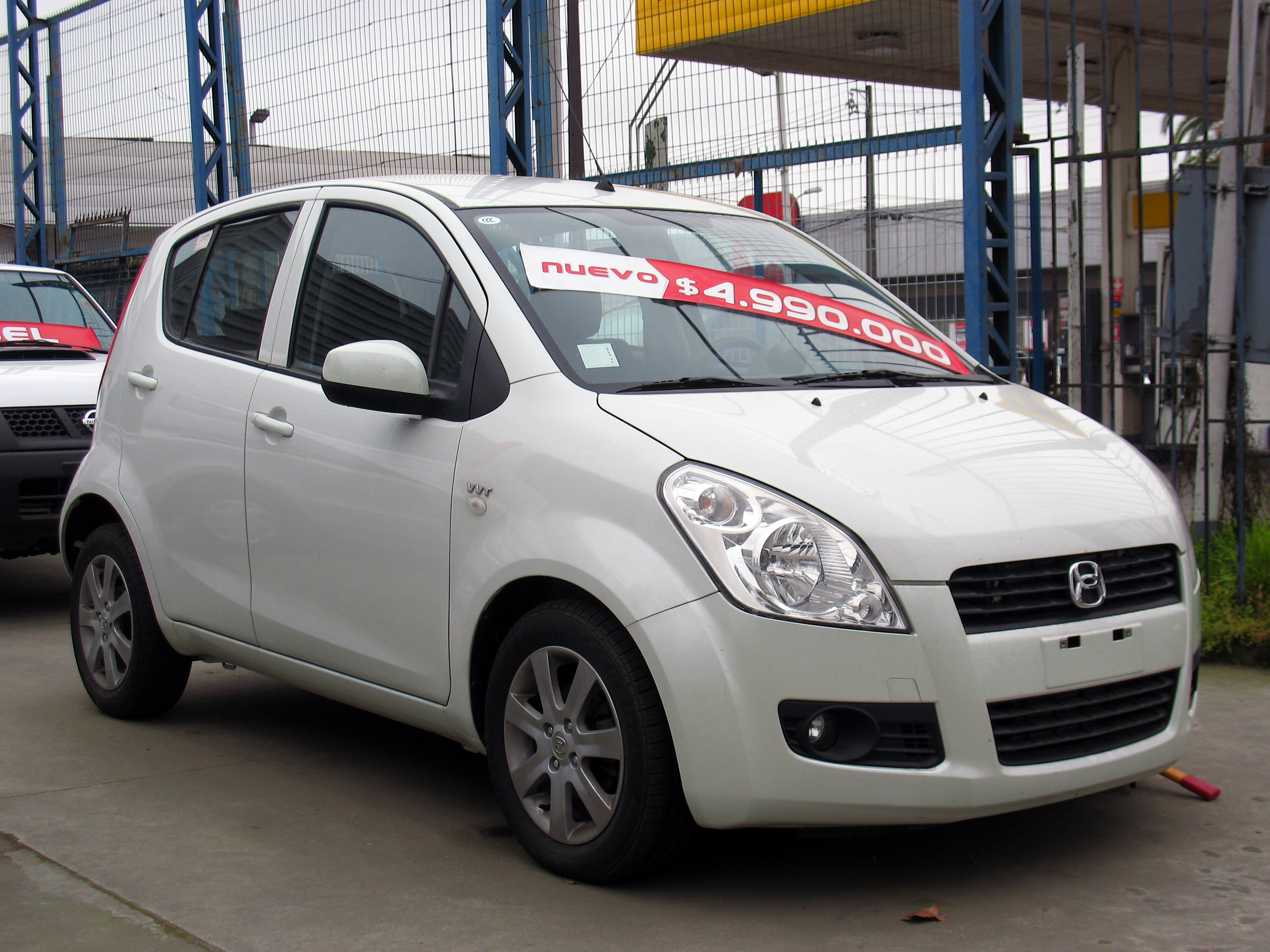
Changhe Spla

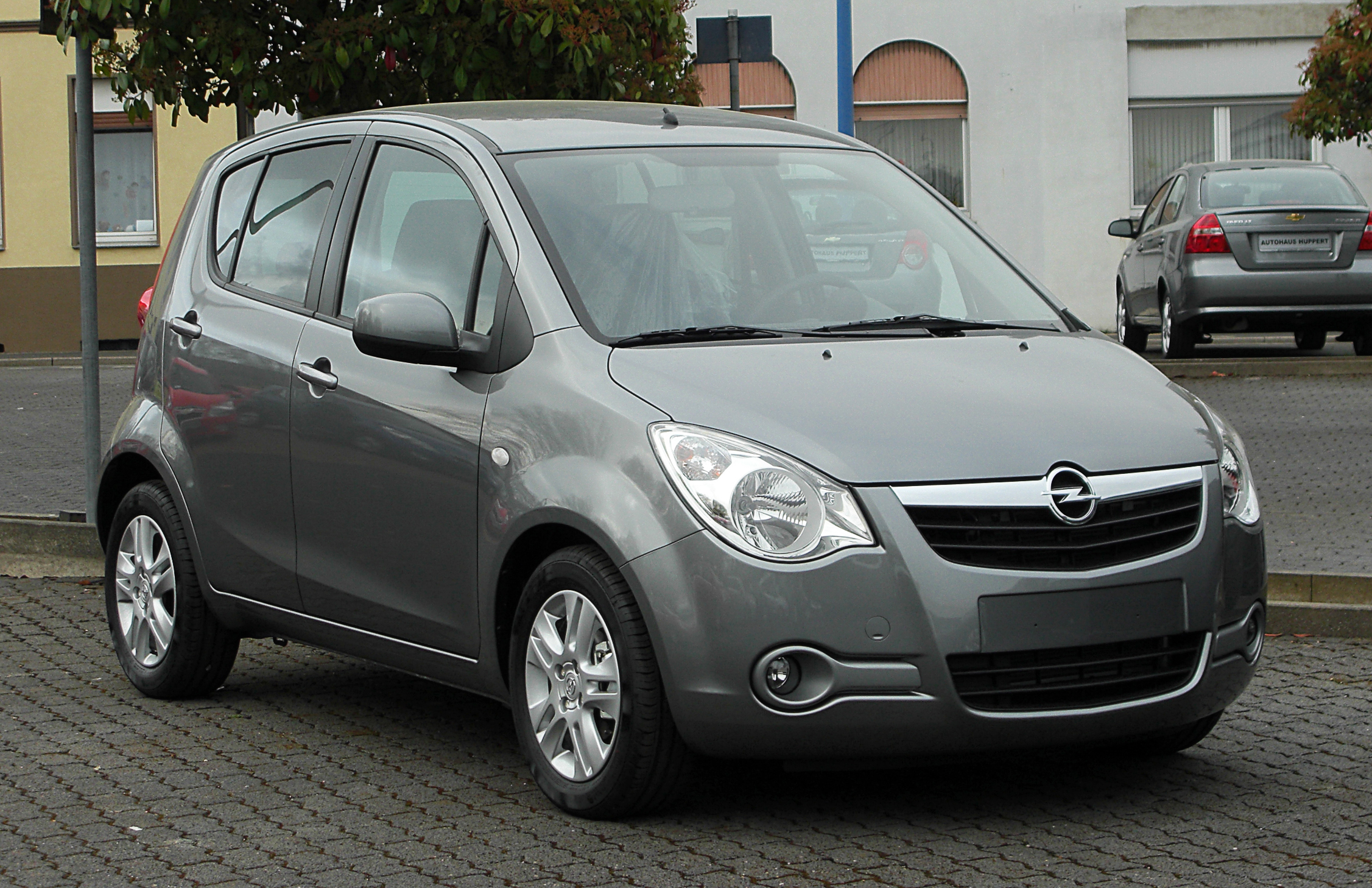
Opel Agila

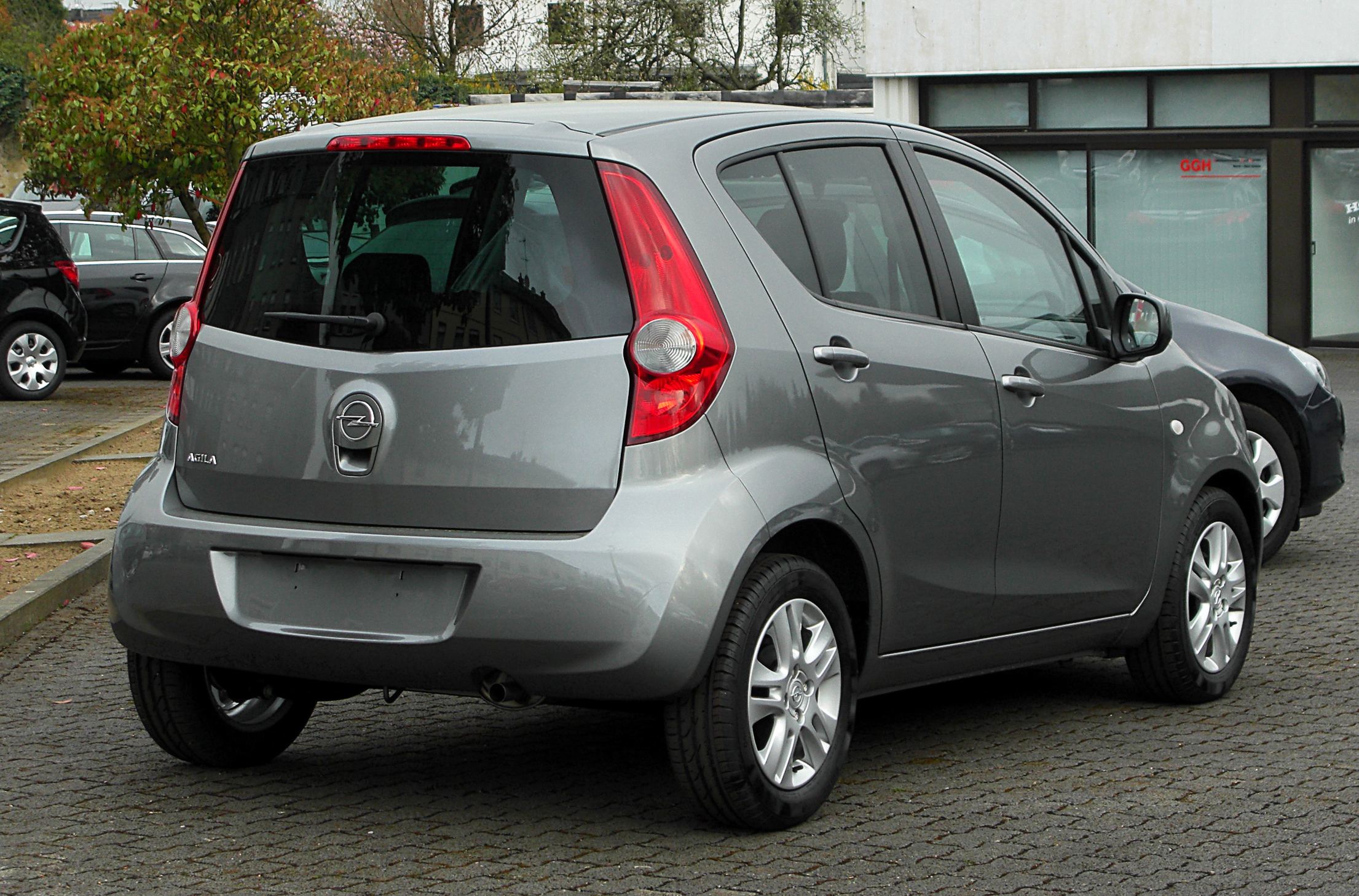
Opel Agila

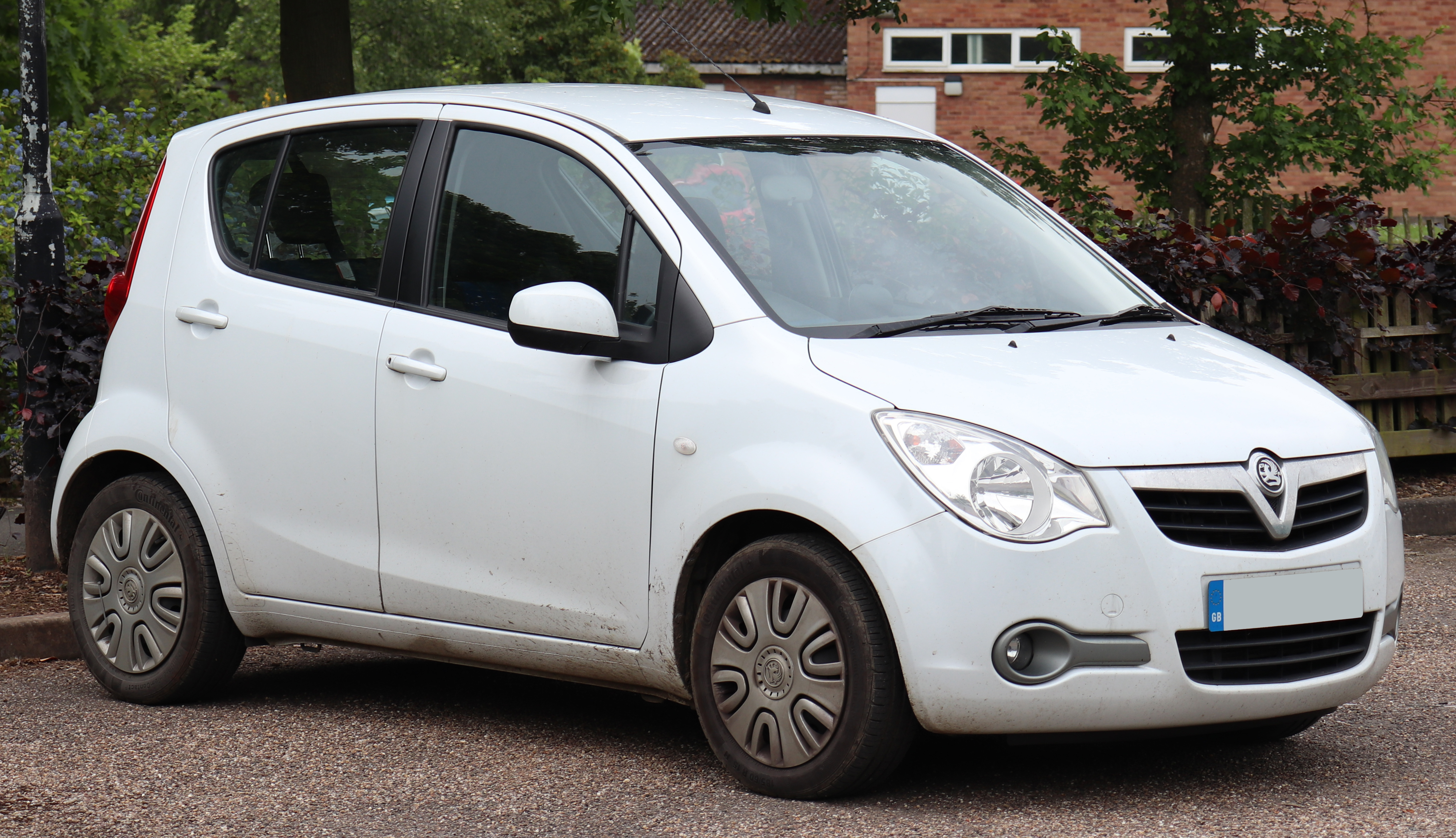
Vauxhall Agila

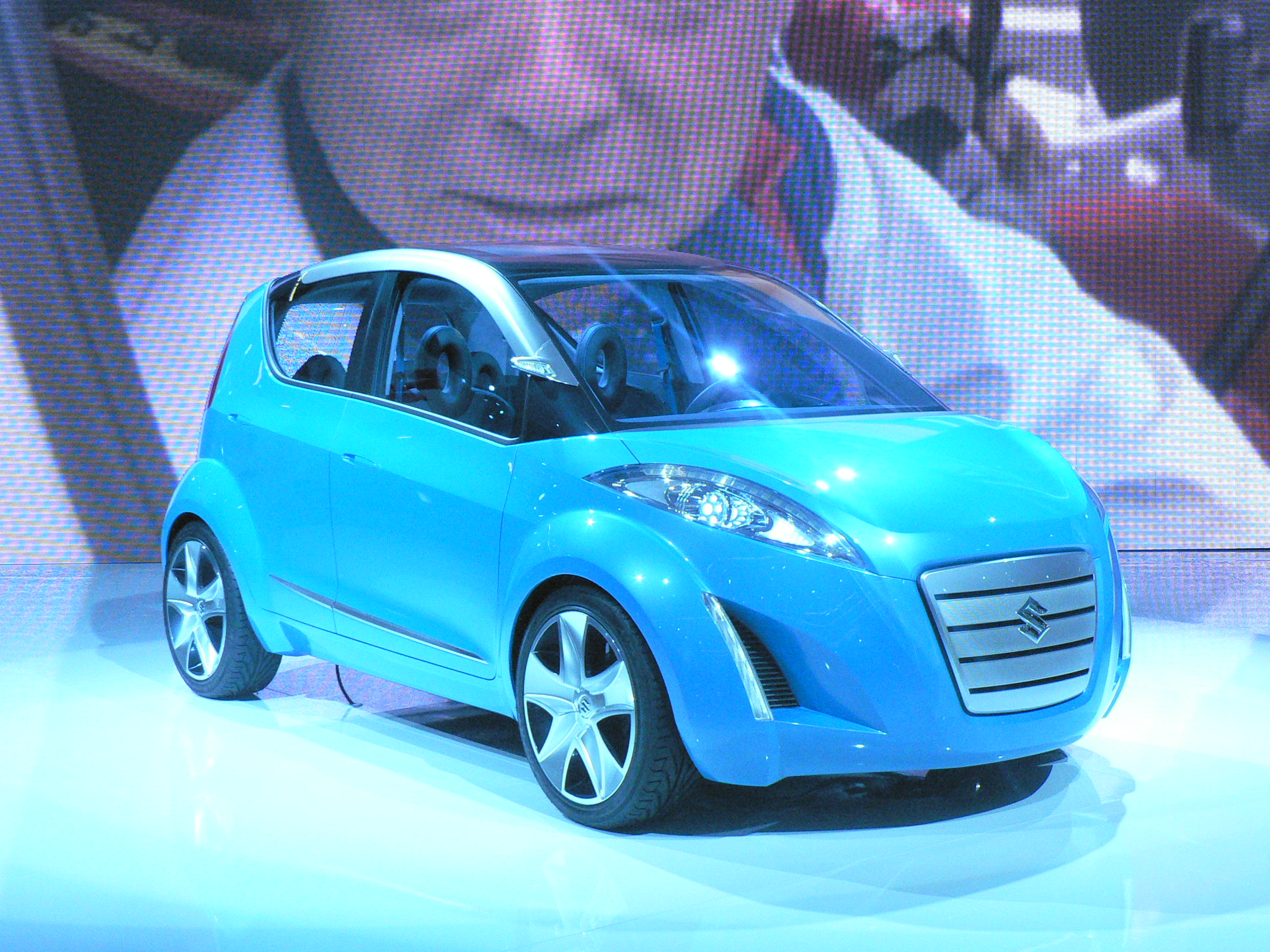
Concept model

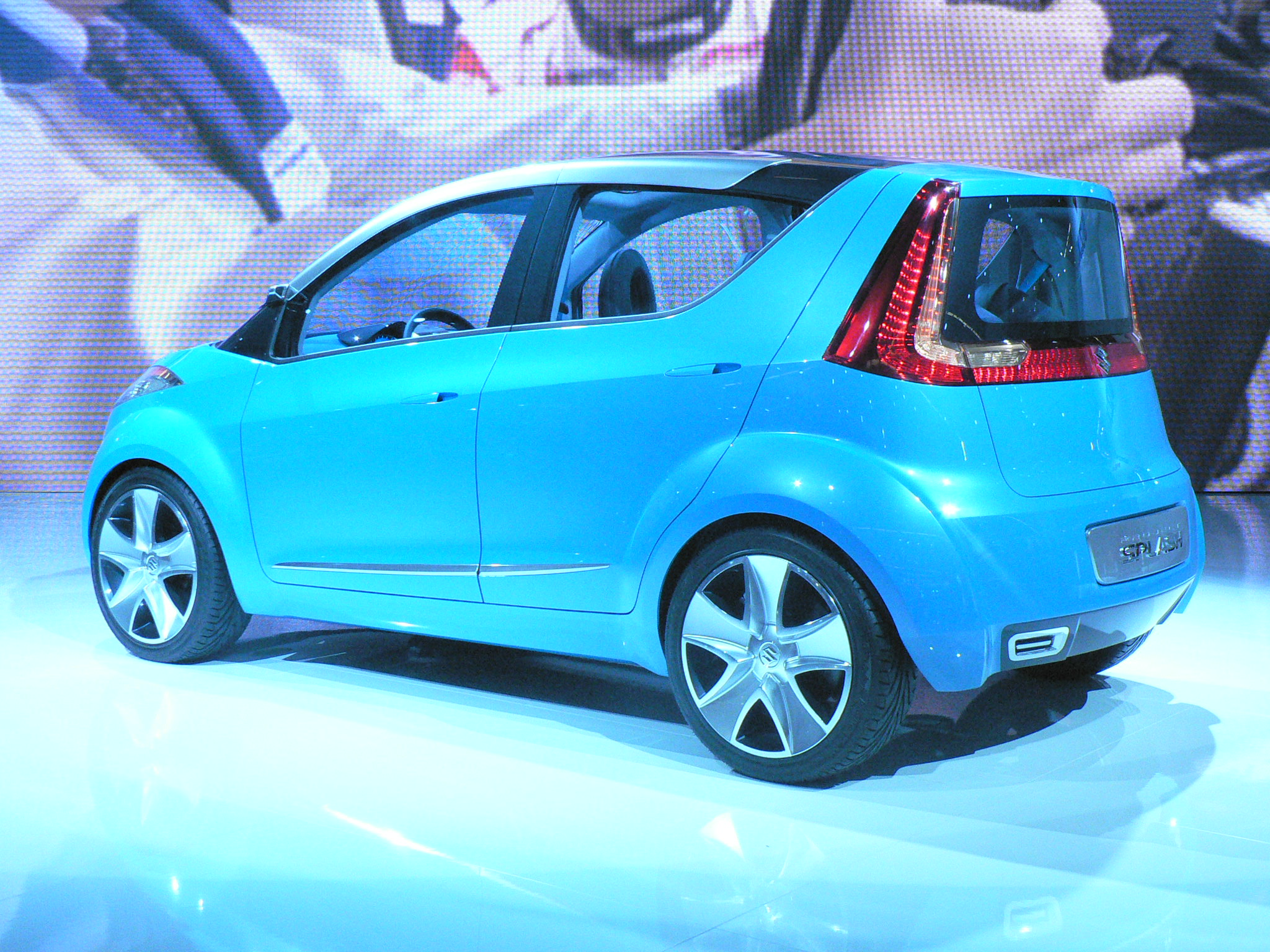
Concept model
