= Derby (cigarette) =

Brazilian cigarette brand

- Product type: Cigarette
- Current owner: British American Tobacco
- Produced by: Souza Cruz
- Country: Brazil
- Introduced: 1993; 33 years ago
- Markets: Latin America, Europe, Asia
- Tagline: "The taste that won Brazil", "100% Brazil Flavor"

Derby is a Brazilian brand of cigarettes, launched in 1993 and currently owned and manufactured by Souza Cruz, a subsidiary of British American Tobacco.

== History ==
After the introduction of the brand, it eventually became the market leader in Brazil, especially in the segment of lower-income consumers, with the slogan "The taste that won Brazil" and "100% Brazil Flavor". The seal was for many years one of the cheaper cigarette brands in Brazil, which made it achieve high sales and the leadership of cigarette sales in the third month after launch. In 1996, the company had sales of 6.2 billion Brazilian real, with Derby as the leader in cigarette sales with 42.4% of the total.

The brand is mainly sold in Brazil, but also is or was sold in Argentina, Bolivia, Chile, Colombia, Costa Rica, Guatemala, Paraguay, Peru, Venezuela, Belgium, Germany, Romania and China.

Brazilian pack of Derby

== See also ==
- Tobacco smoking
