= Souza Cruz =

Tobacco company

Souza Cruz S.A.
- Type: Subsidiary
- Industry: Tobacco
- Founded: 25 April 1903; 123 years ago
- Founder: Albino Souza Cruz
- Headquarters: Rio de Janeiro, Brazil
- Key people: Jack Bowles (chairman); Andrea Martini (CEO)
- Products: Cigarettes
- Revenue: ▲US$ 2.6 billion (2013)
- Net income: ▲US$ 719.4 million (2013)
- Number of employees: 9,000
- Parent: British American Tobacco
- Website: souzacruz.com.br

Souza Cruz S.A., doing business as BAT Brasil, is a Brazilian tobacco manufacturing company based in Rio de Janeiro. Souza Cruz is a subsidiary of British American Tobacco. The company was founded in 1903 by the Portuguese immigrant Albino Souza Cruz, who in 1914 converted the company into a corporation and transferred the controlling interest to British American Tobacco.

Souza Cruz is currently the leader in the domestic market for cigarettes, with a 62.1% share of the Brazilian market, and is among the top ten tax payers in the country.

== Overview ==
It operates throughout the product cycle, from production and processing of tobacco through manufacturing and distribution of cigarettes. Souza Cruz employs nearly nine thousand people at tobacco harvest time. The company markets more than 78 billion units of cigarettes a year through 260 thousand retail stores.

In the production of tobacco, about 40 thousand integrated producers receive technical assistance from the company. In addition to processing tobacco for its own products for the domestic market, the integrated production system of Souza Cruz produces more than 127 tons of tobacco for export to more than 50 countries on 5 continents.

The company is based in Rio de Janeiro and has two cigarette factories: one in Uberlândia, Minas Gerais, and another in Cachoeirinha, Rio Grande do Sul, which is also the site of the company's center for research and development. It also has five central integrated distribution centers, in São Paulo, Rio de Janeiro, Belo Horizonte, Porto Alegre and Recife, responsible for coordinating distribution to the retailer. The company also has processing plants in the main tobacco regions, in Santa Cruz do Sul, Blumenau, Rio Negro and Patos, in the states of Rio Grande do Sul, Santa Catarina, Paraná and Paraíba, respectively.

== Joint ventures ==
Souza Cruz has two joint ventures: Brascuba and Agrega.

Brascuba is an equally owned joint venture with the Cuban government that has existed since 1995, dedicated to the production and export of cigarettes. The Cuban government considers the company one of the five biggest successes of the joint enterprise in the country.

Agrega is a joint venture between AmBev and Souza Cruz, with a focus on strategic thinking and process improvement, optimizing costs and identifying market opportunities. It began operations in January 2002 with the aim of reducing costs through scale and materials management services and utilizing synergies between the two companies.
