= Suzuki HEARTECT platform =

Subcompact car platform

Overview
- Manufacturer: Suzuki
- Production: 2014–present

Body and chassis
- Class: Kei car; City car; Subcompact car; Mini MPV; Compact MPV; Subcompact crossover SUV
- Layout: Front-engine, front-wheel-drive; Front-engine, four-wheel-drive

The HEARTECT platform is an automobile platform that underpins various Suzuki models since 2014. It was first introduced in the eighth-generation Alto, which debuted in December 2014.

== Construction ==
The platform is claimed to utilize "Advanced High Tensile Steel" and "Ultra High Tensile Steel", which are intended to increase occupant safety in case of a collision. Suzuki also claims that the platform offers increased body stiffness, allowing for better ride quality and handling. Additionally, via a reduction in weight of up to 30 kg (66 lb), the platform helps achieve an improved power to weight ratio.

The platform is shown to utilize MacPherson strut front suspension.

A derivative platform for battery electric vehicles, named Heartech-e, was first introduced on the e Vitara in 2024.

== Applications ==
=== Kei cars ===
- Suzuki Alto / Mazda Carol — HA36S/V (2014–2021)
- Suzuki Alto / Mazda Carol — HA37/97 (2021–present)
- Suzuki Alto Lapin (2015–present)
- Suzuki Wagon R / Mazda Flair (2017–present)
- Suzuki Spacia / Mazda Flair Wagon — MK53S (2017–2024)
- Suzuki Hustler / Mazda Flair Crossover (2020–present)
- Suzuki Wagon R Smile (2021–present)
- Suzuki Spacia Base — MK33V (2022–present)
- Suzuki Spacia / Mazda Flair Wagon — MK54S (2023–present)

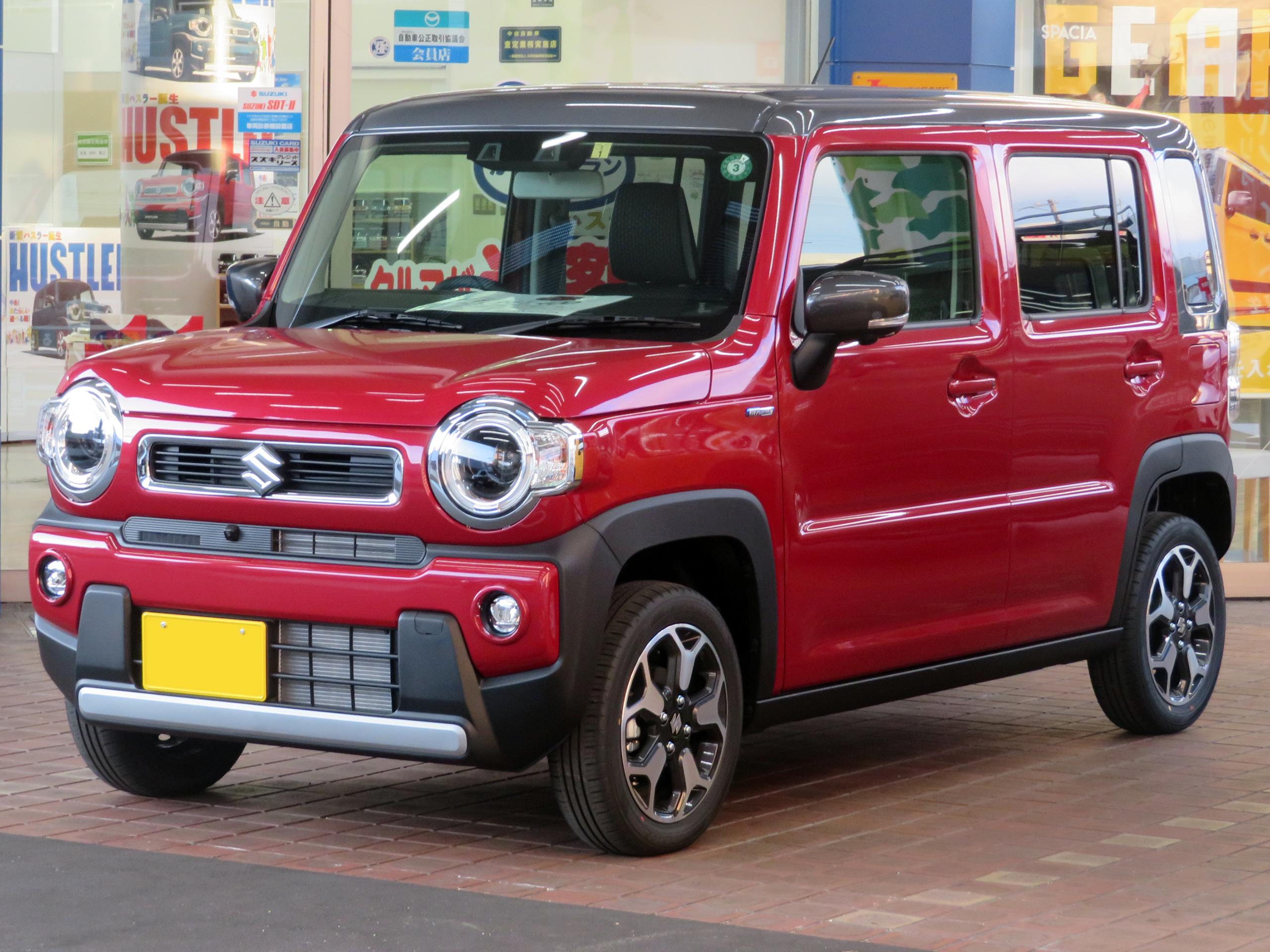
Suzuki Hustler

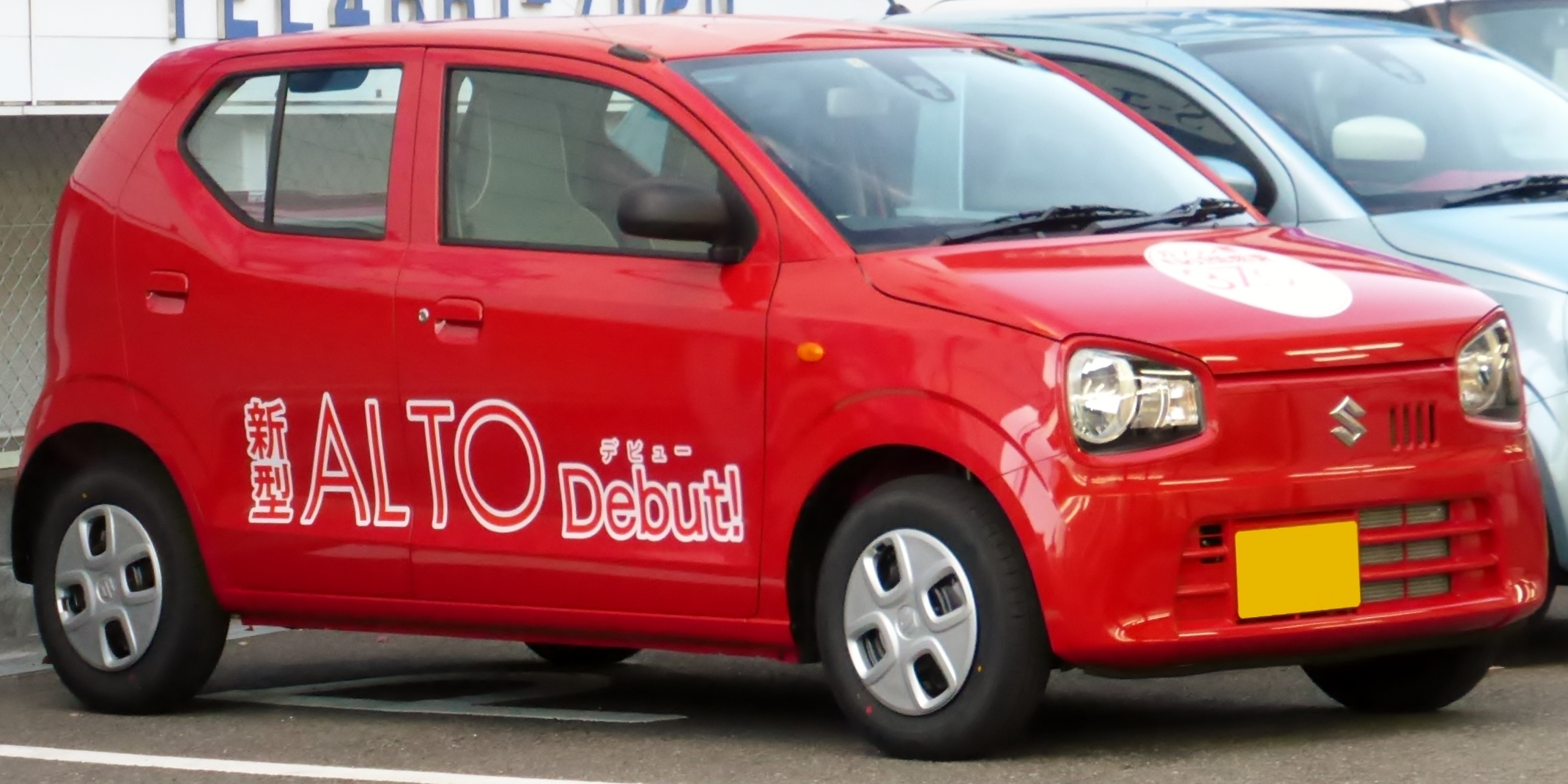
Suzuki Alto (HA36S/V)

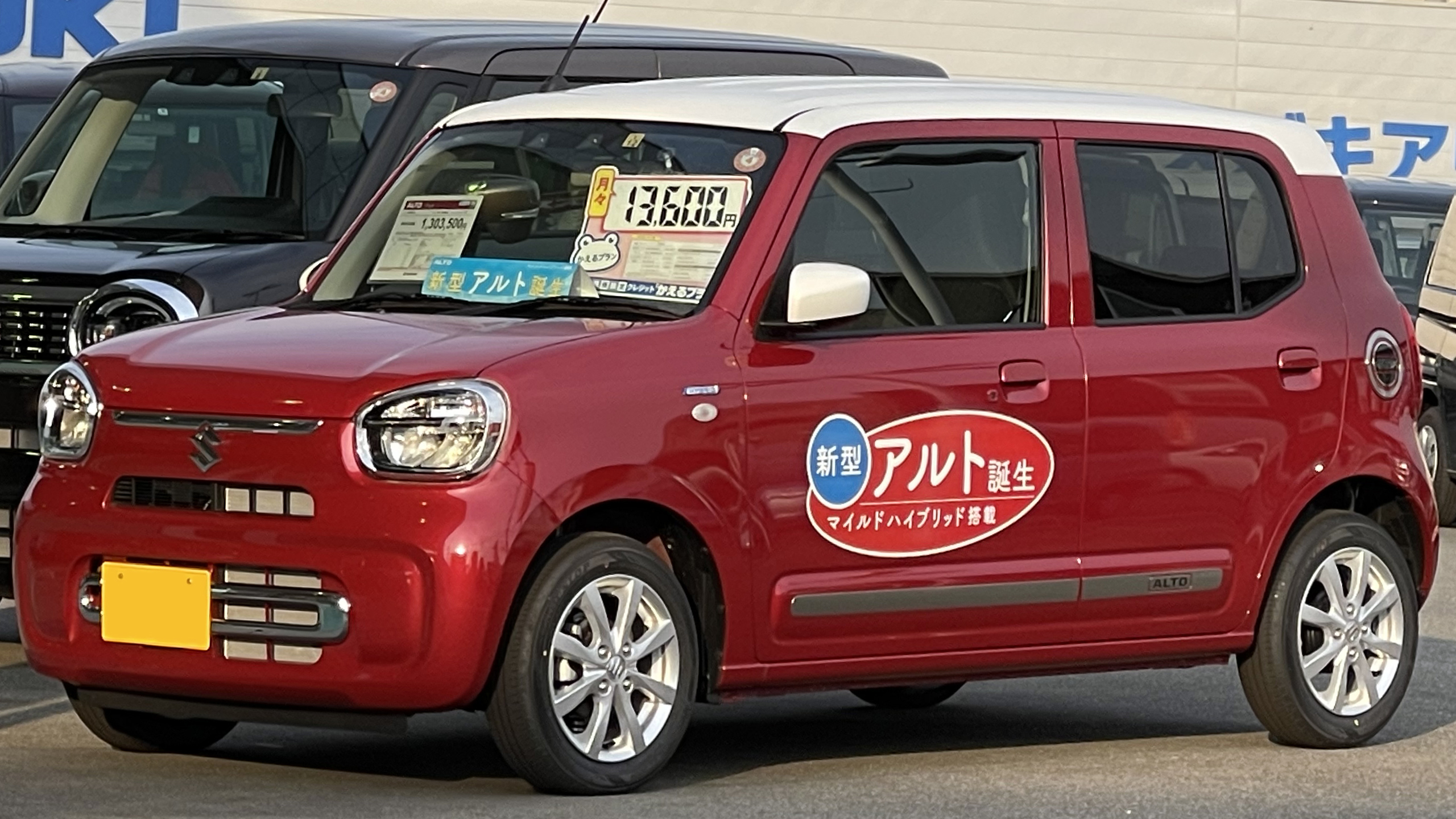
Suzuki Alto (HA37/97)

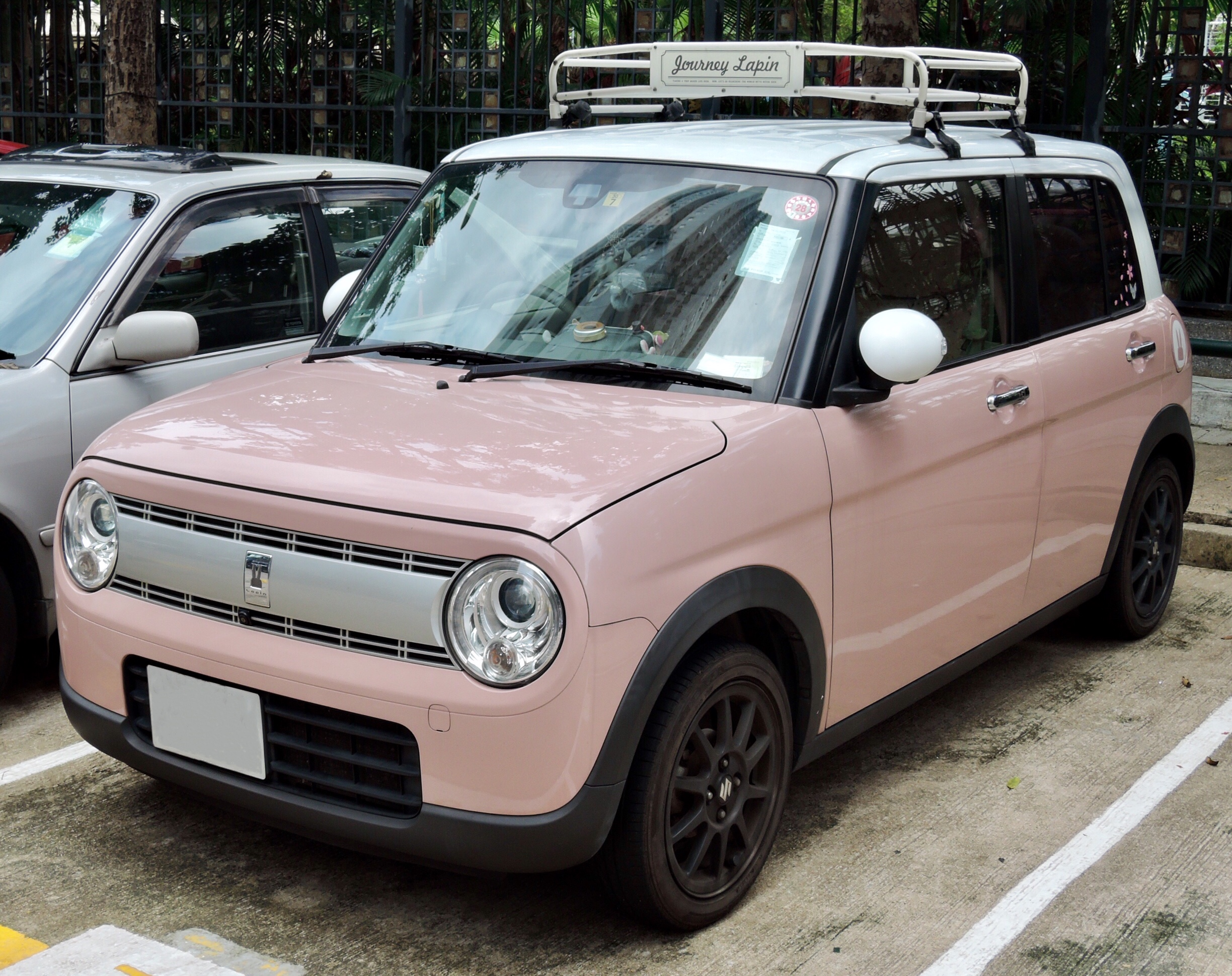
Suzuki Alto Lapin

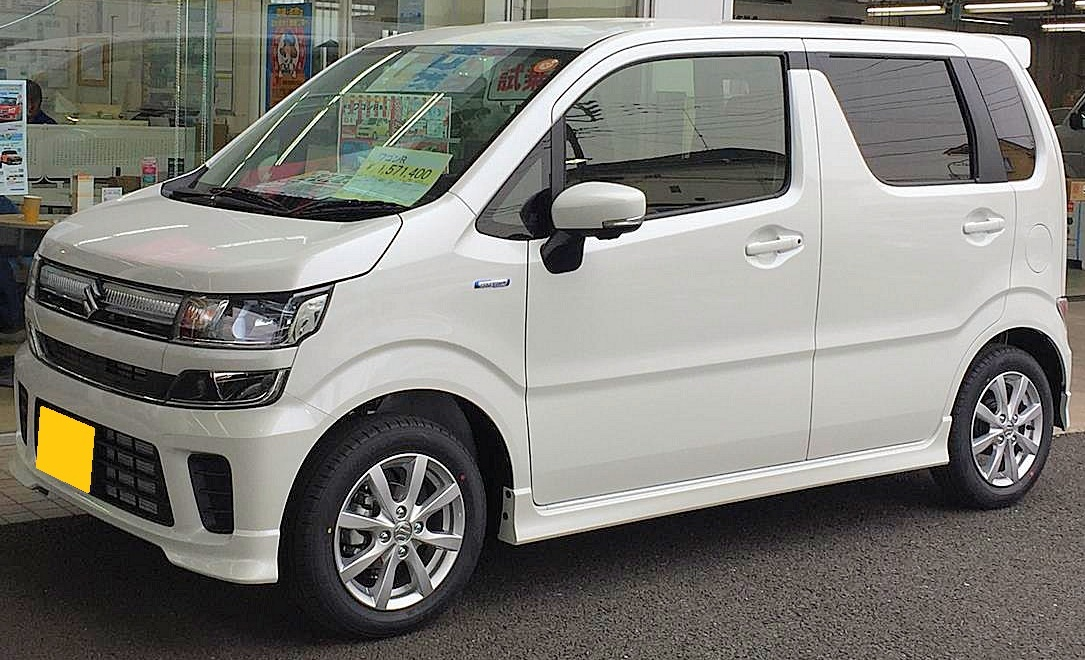
Suzuki Wagon R

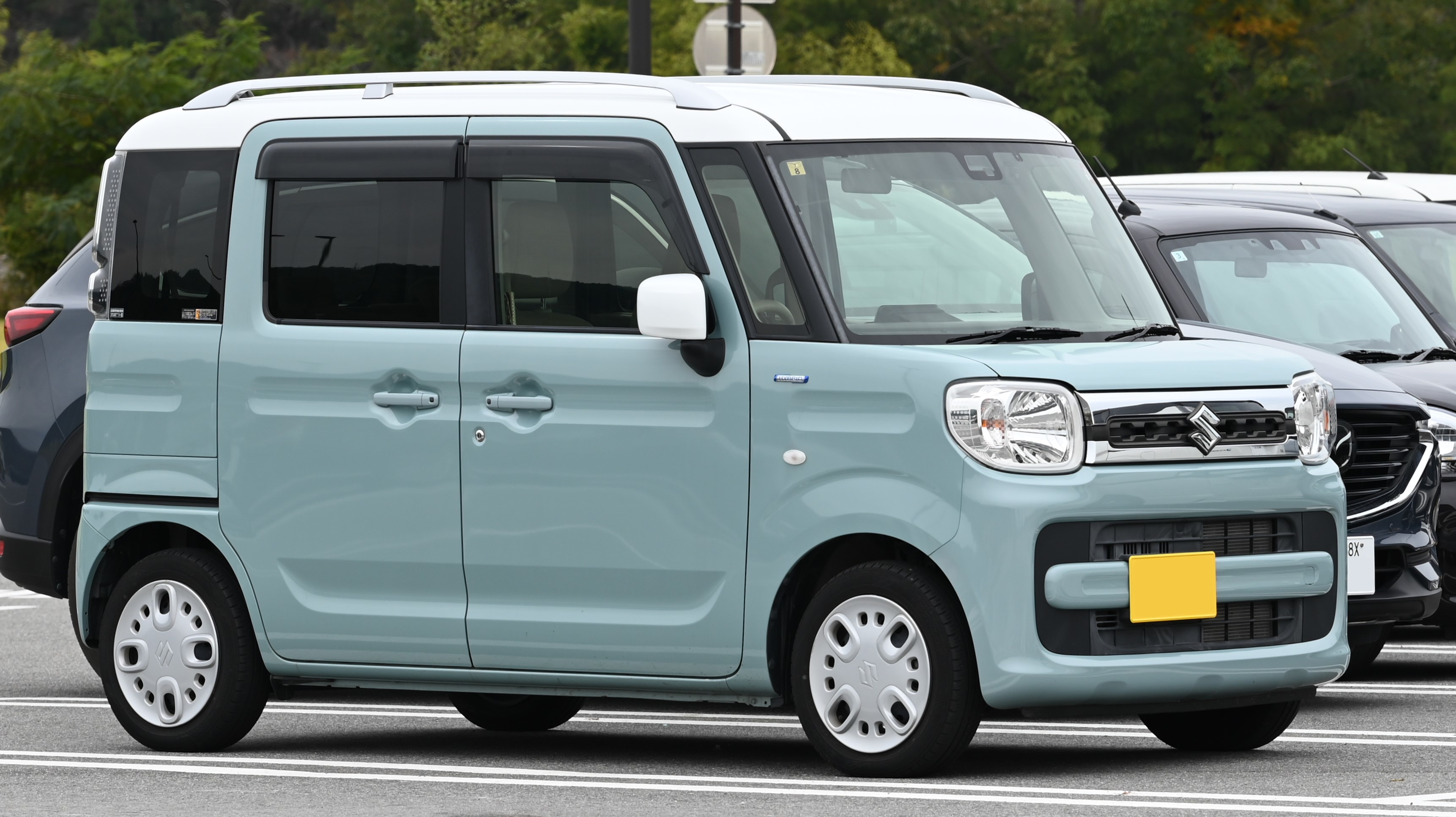
Suzuki Spacia (MK53S)

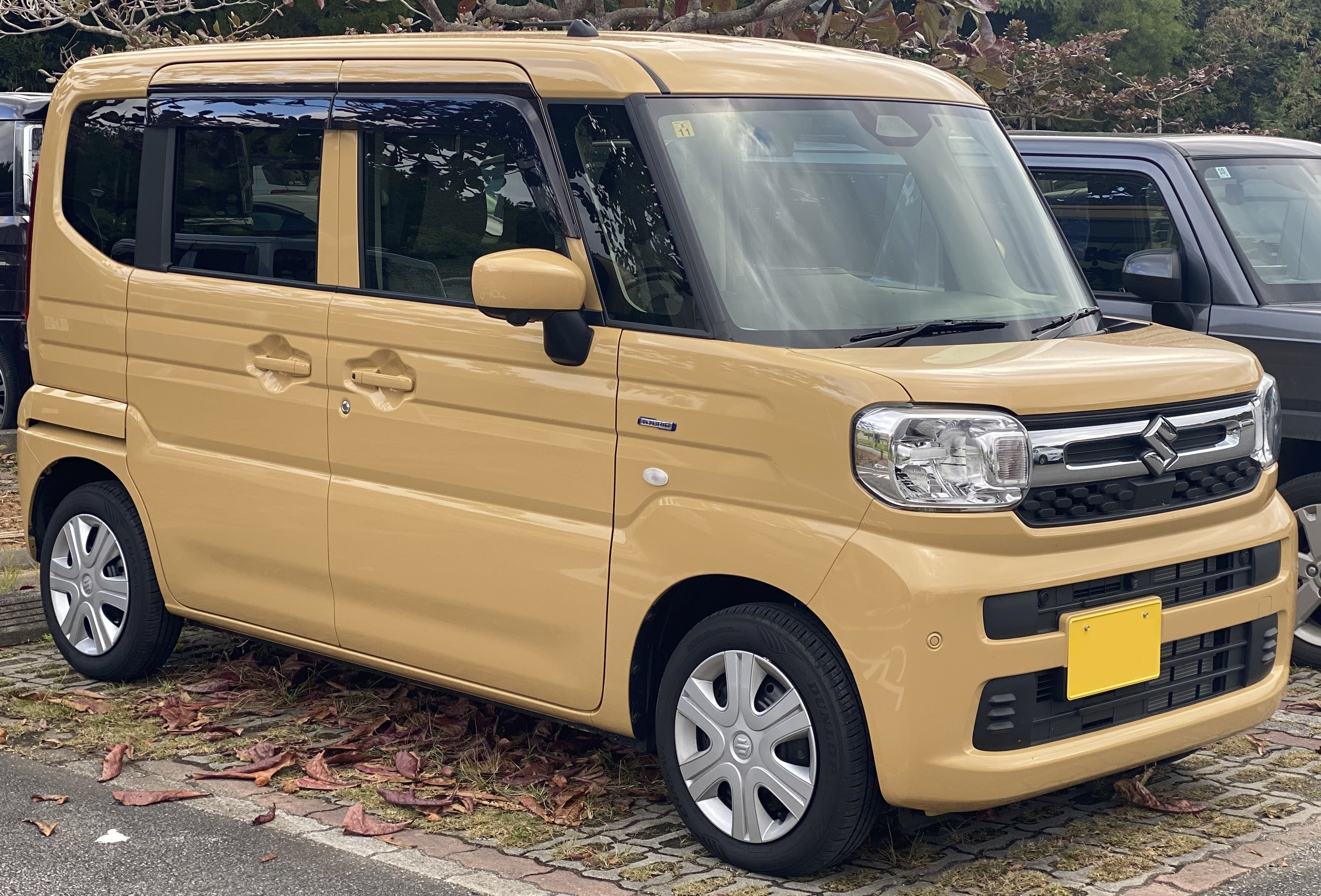
Suzuki Spacia (MK54S)

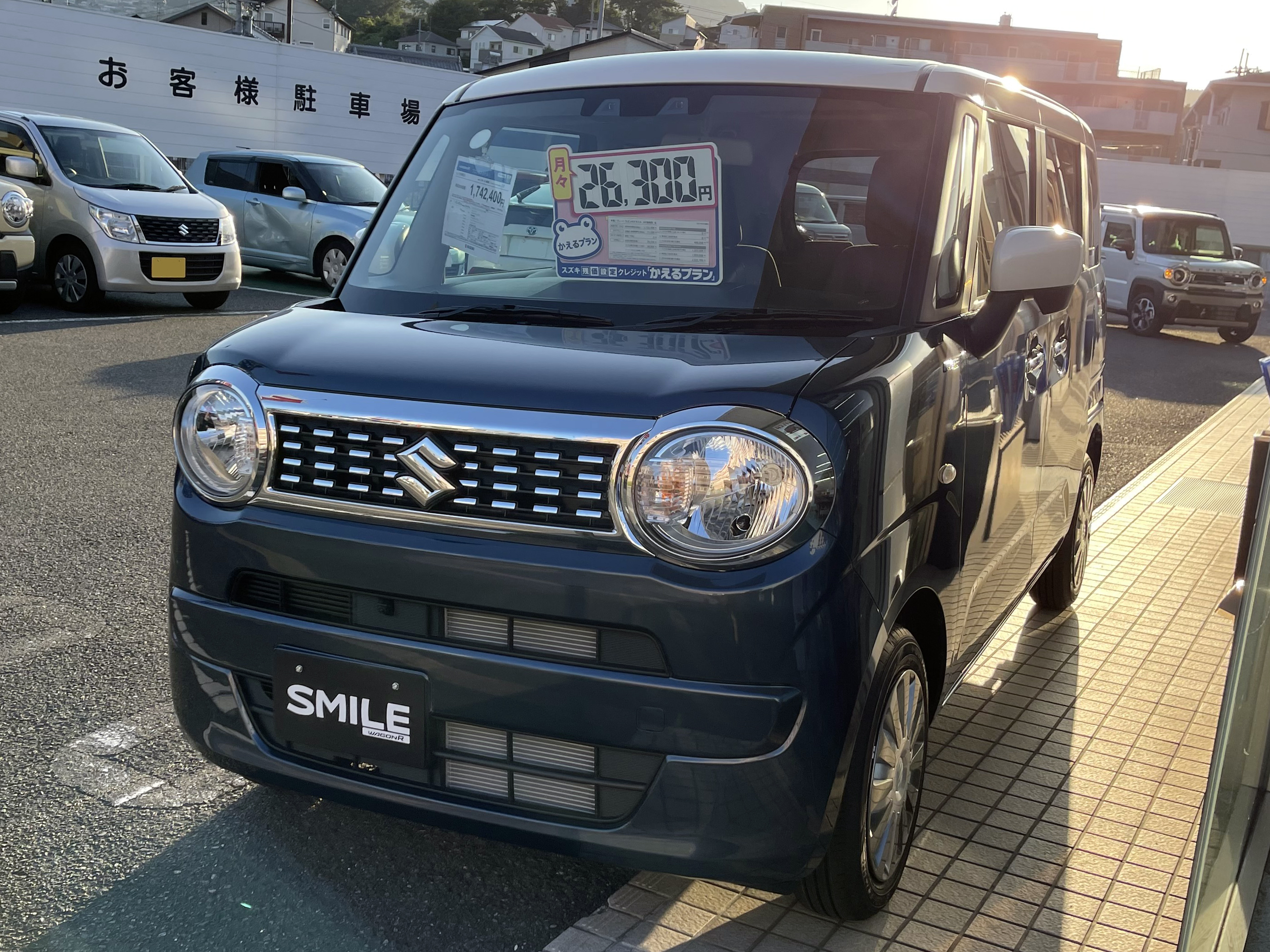
Suzuki Wagon R Smile

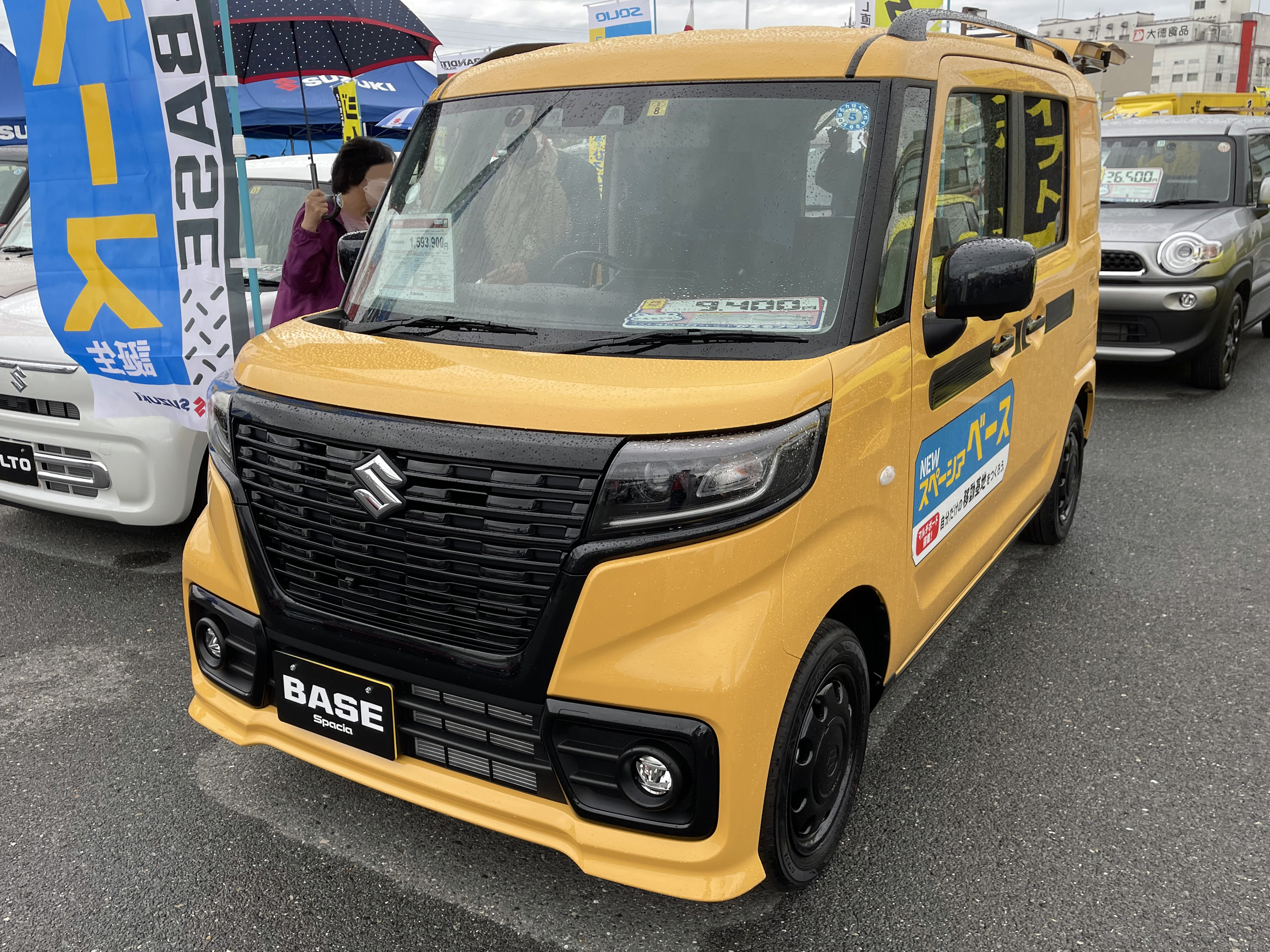
Suzuki Spacia Base

=== Subcompact cars ===
- Suzuki Baleno / Toyota Glanza / Starlet — WB1 (2015–2022)
- Suzuki Baleno / Toyota Glanza / Starlet — WB2 (2022–present)
- Suzuki Solio / Mitsubishi Delica D:2 — MA26S/36S/46S (2015–2020)
- Suzuki Solio / Mitsubishi Delica D:2 — MA27S/37S/D7S (2020–present)
- Suzuki Ignis (2016–2026)
- Suzuki Swift — A2L (2016–2023)
- Suzuki Swift — AOL (2023–present)
- Suzuki Dzire (2017–2024)
- Suzuki Dzire (2024–present)
- Suzuki Xbee (2017–present)
- Maruti Suzuki Wagon R (2019–present)
- Suzuki S-Presso (2019–present)
- Suzuki Celerio / Toyota Vitz (2021–present)
- Maruti Suzuki Alto K10 (2022–present)
- Suzuki Fronx / Toyota Urban Cruiser Taisor/ Starlet Cross (2023–present)
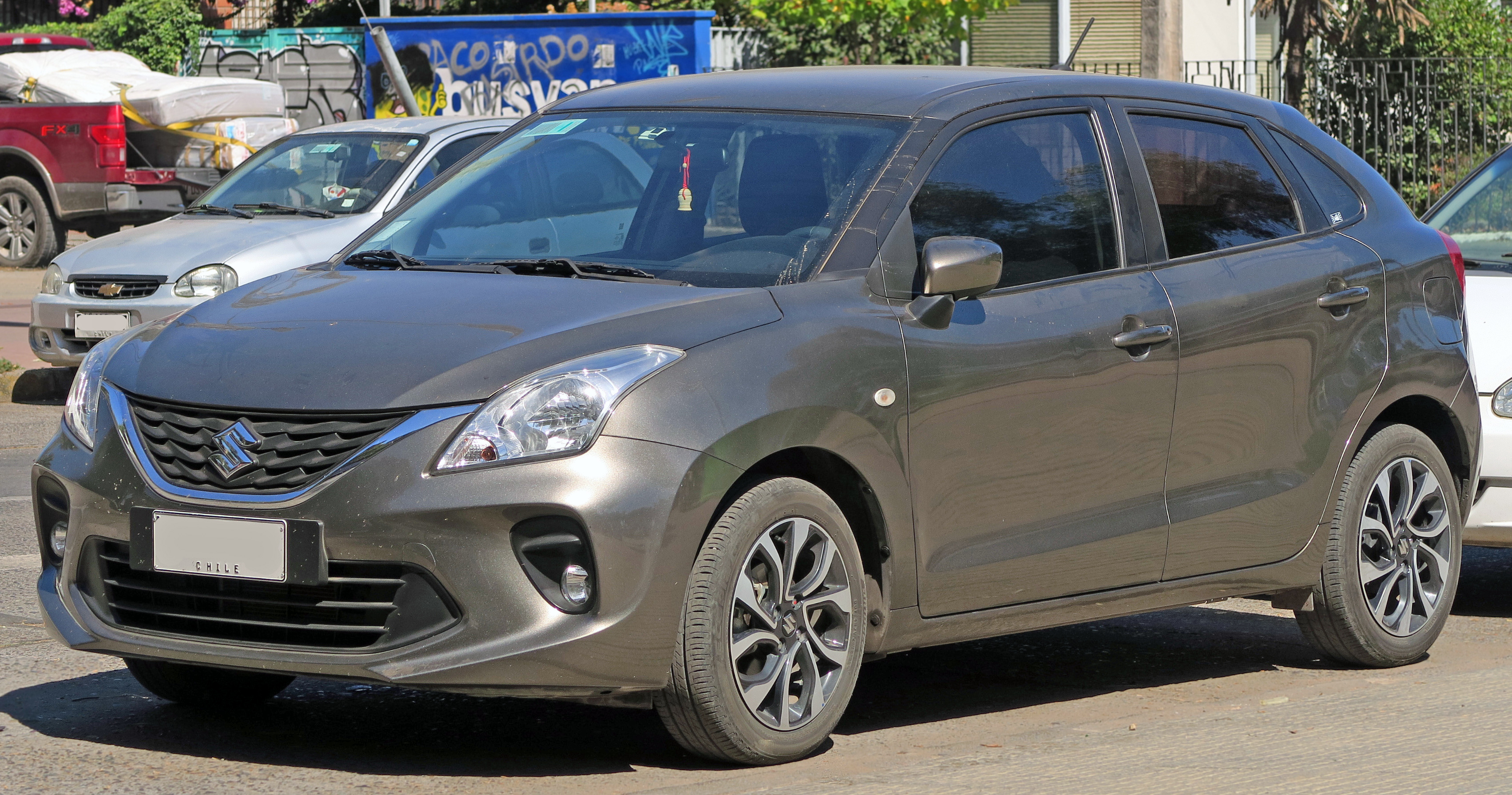
Suzuki Baleno (WB1)

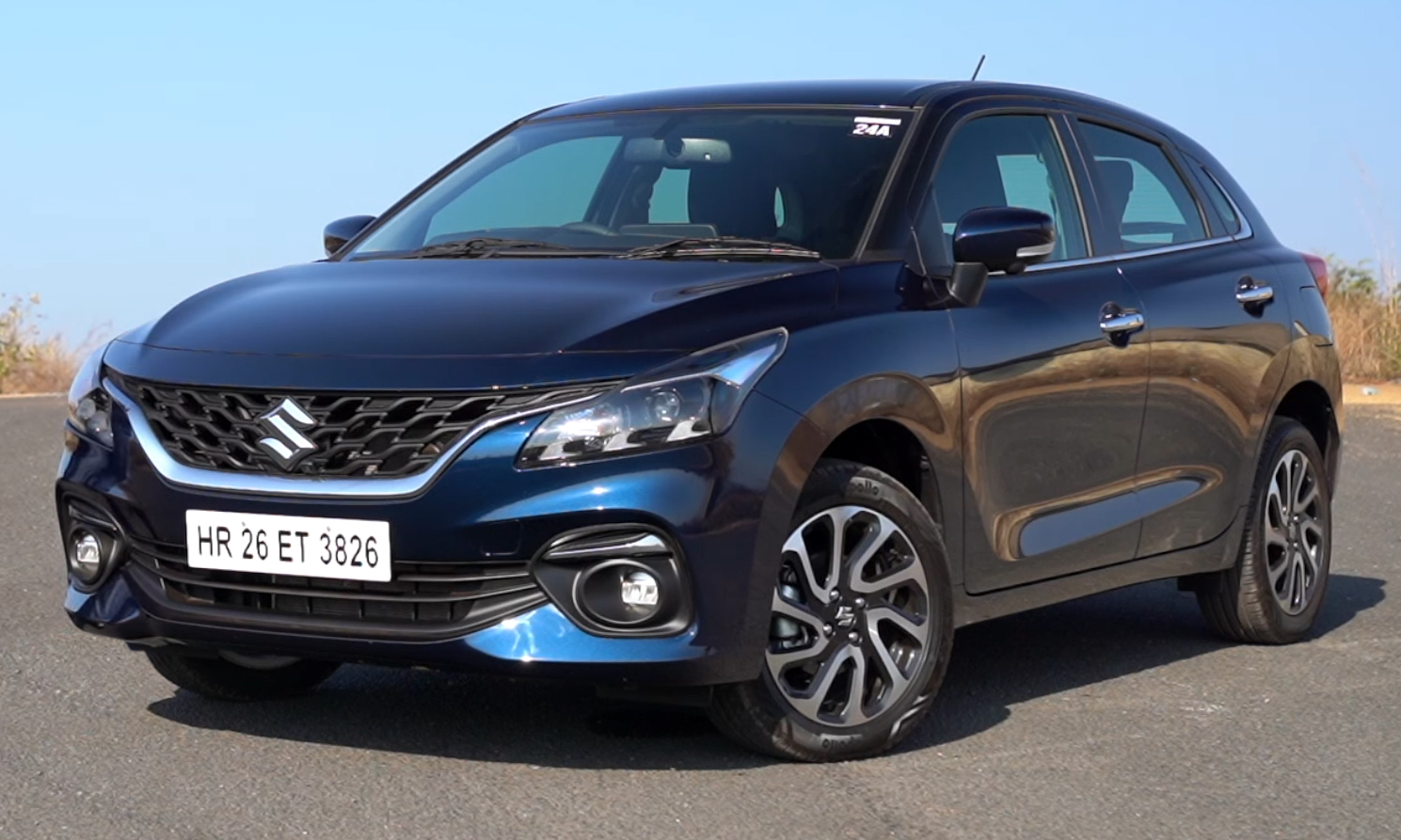
Suzuki Baleno (WB2)

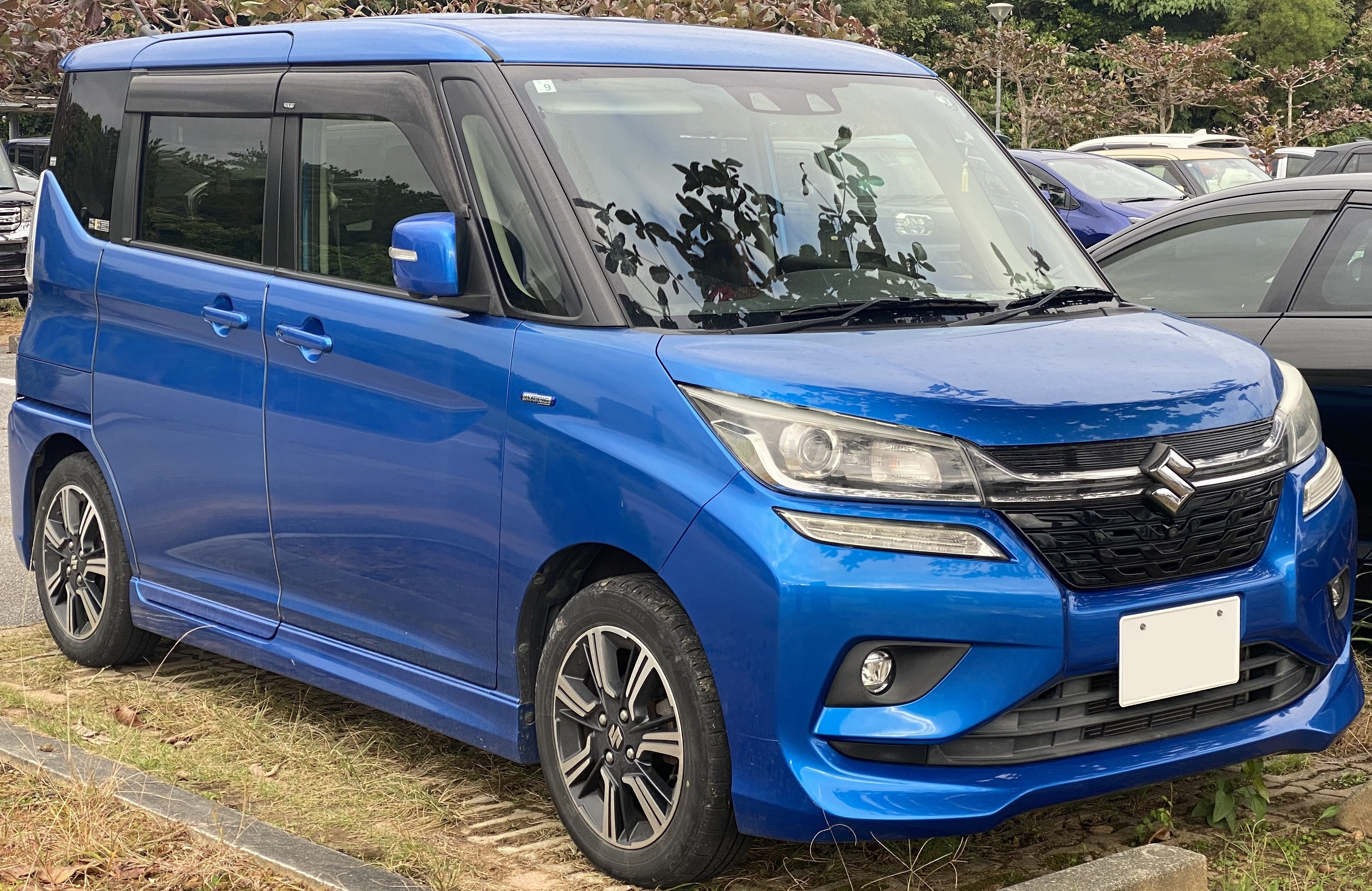
Suzuki Solio (MA26S/36S/46S)

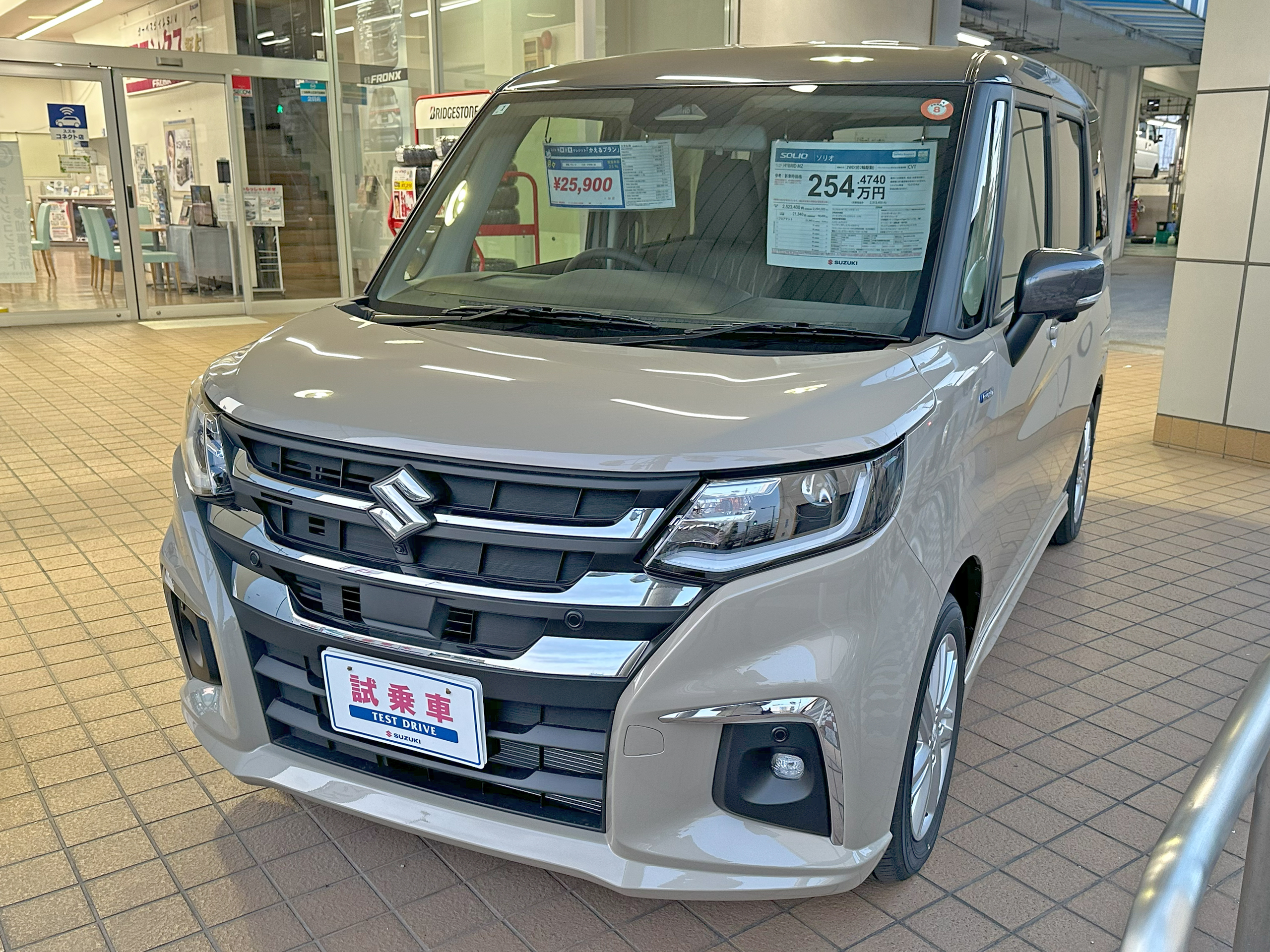
Suzuki Solio (MA27S/37S/D7S)

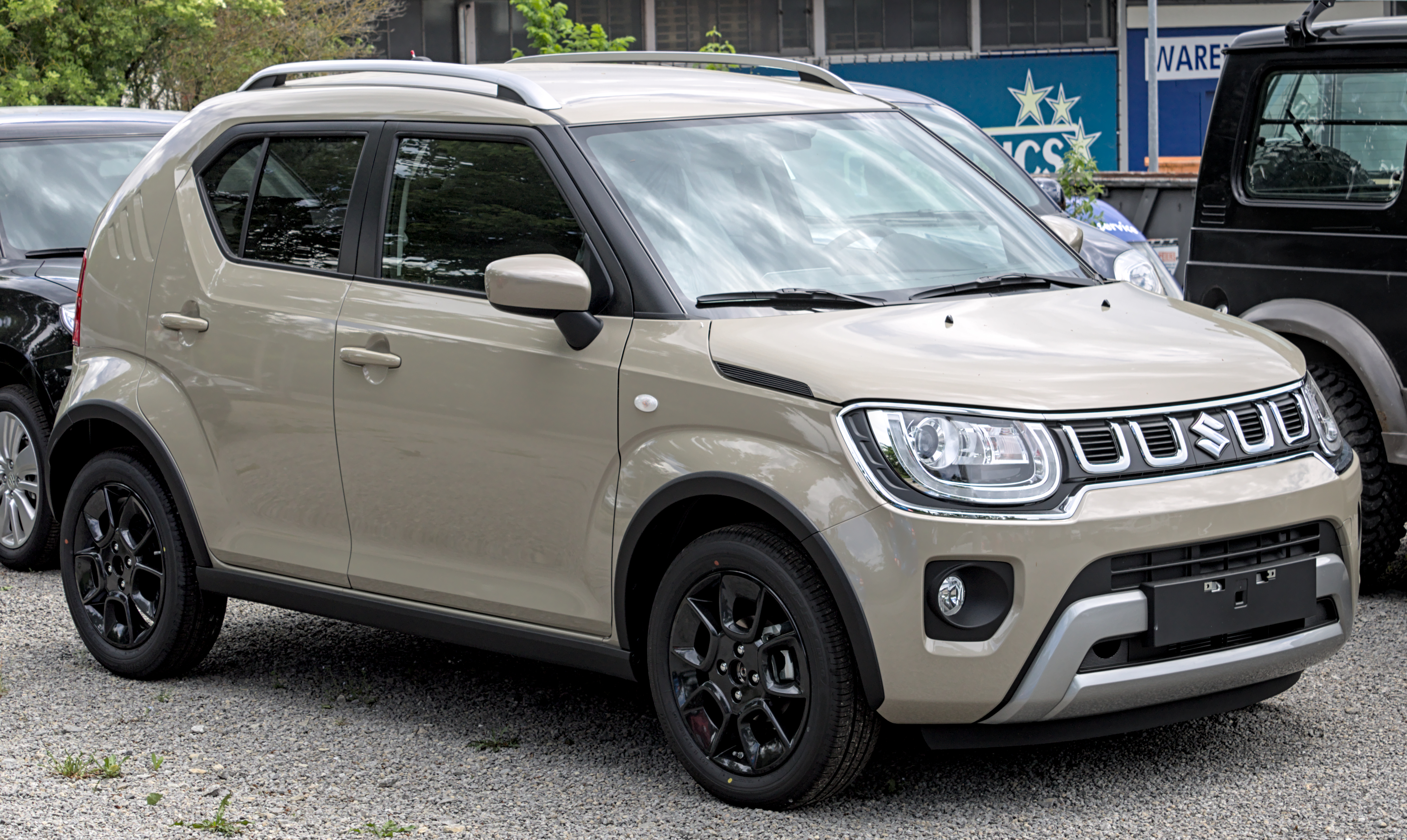
Suzuki Ignis

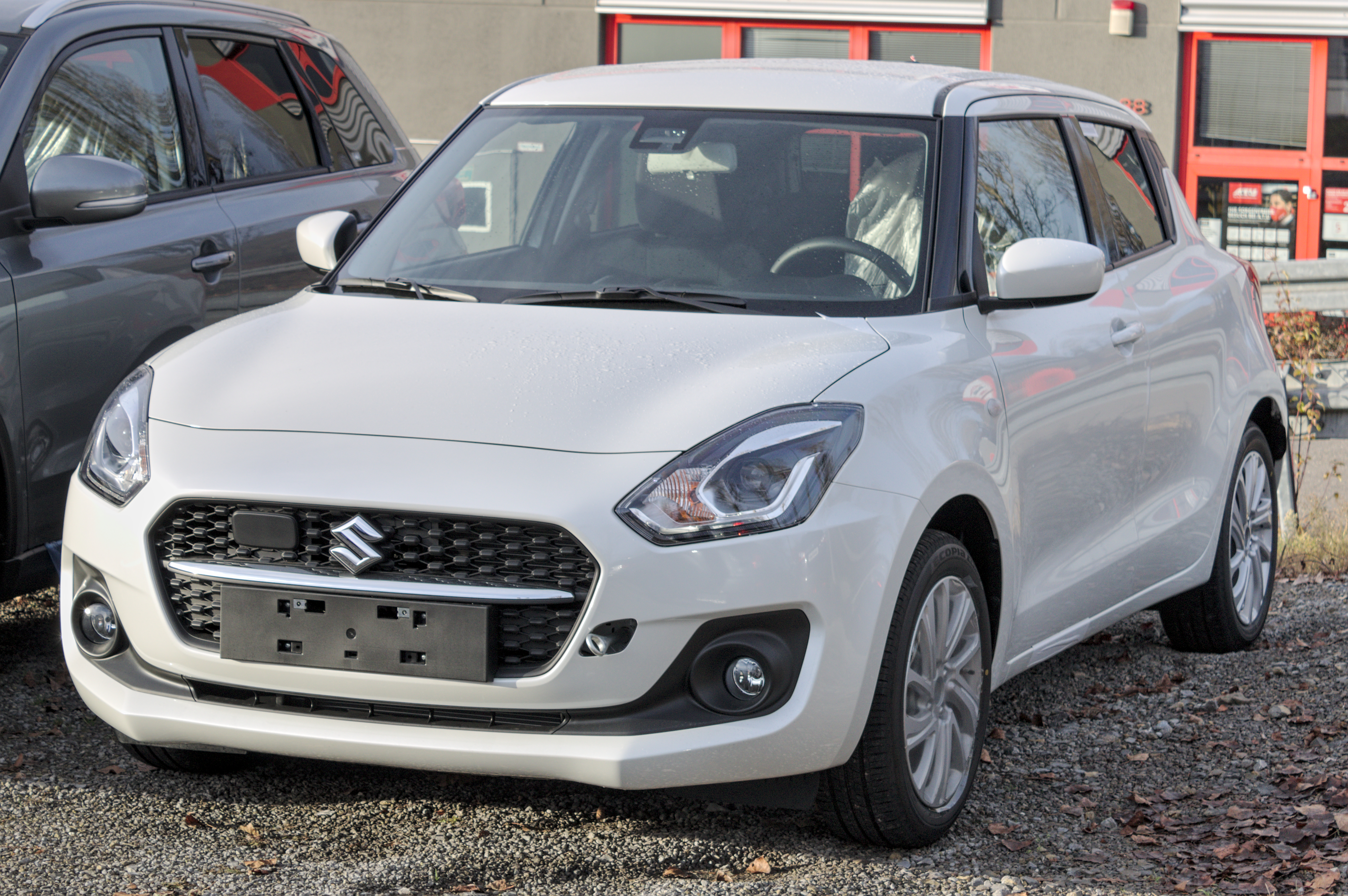
Suzuki Swift (A2L)

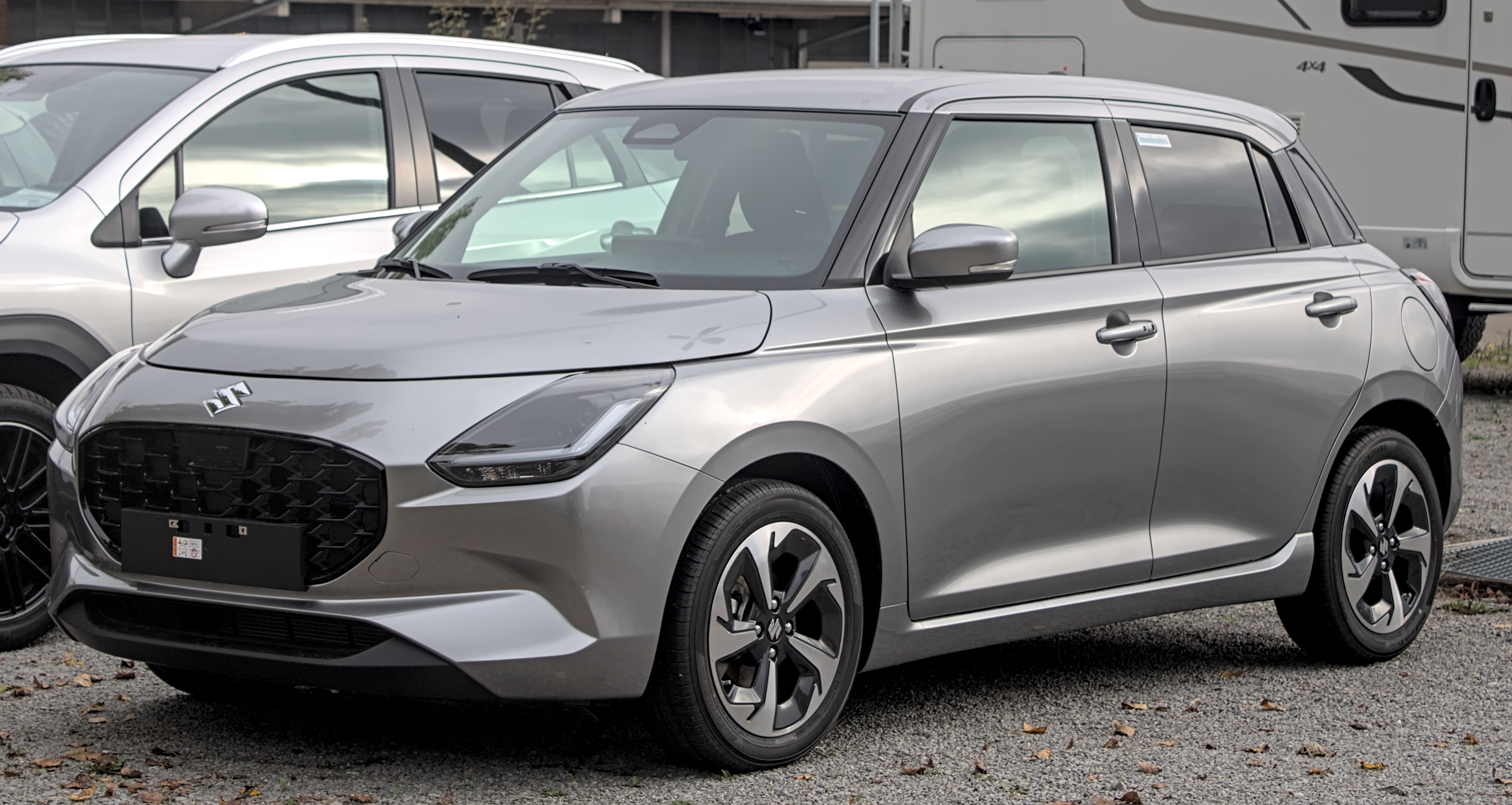
Suzuki Swift (AOL)

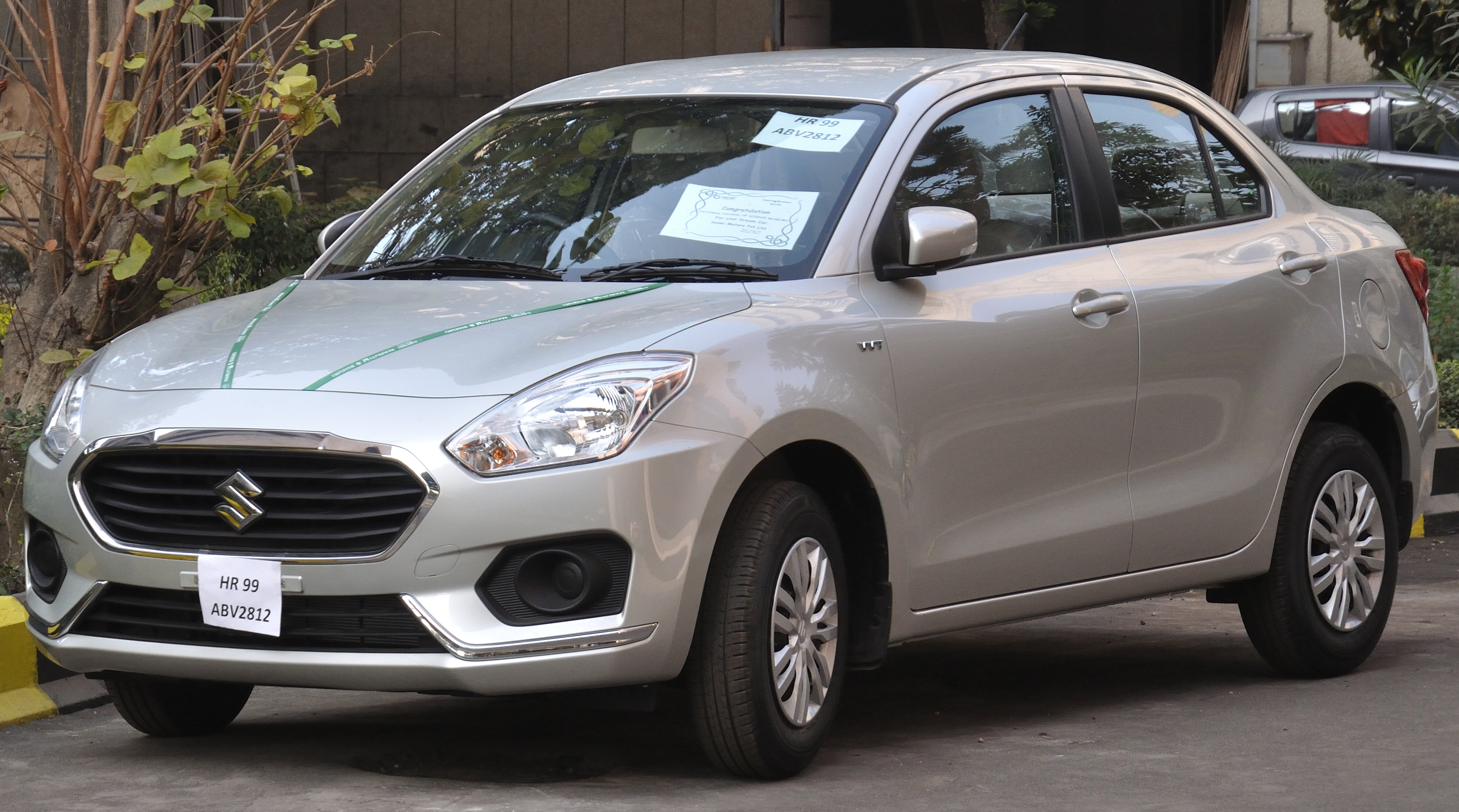
Suzuki Dzire

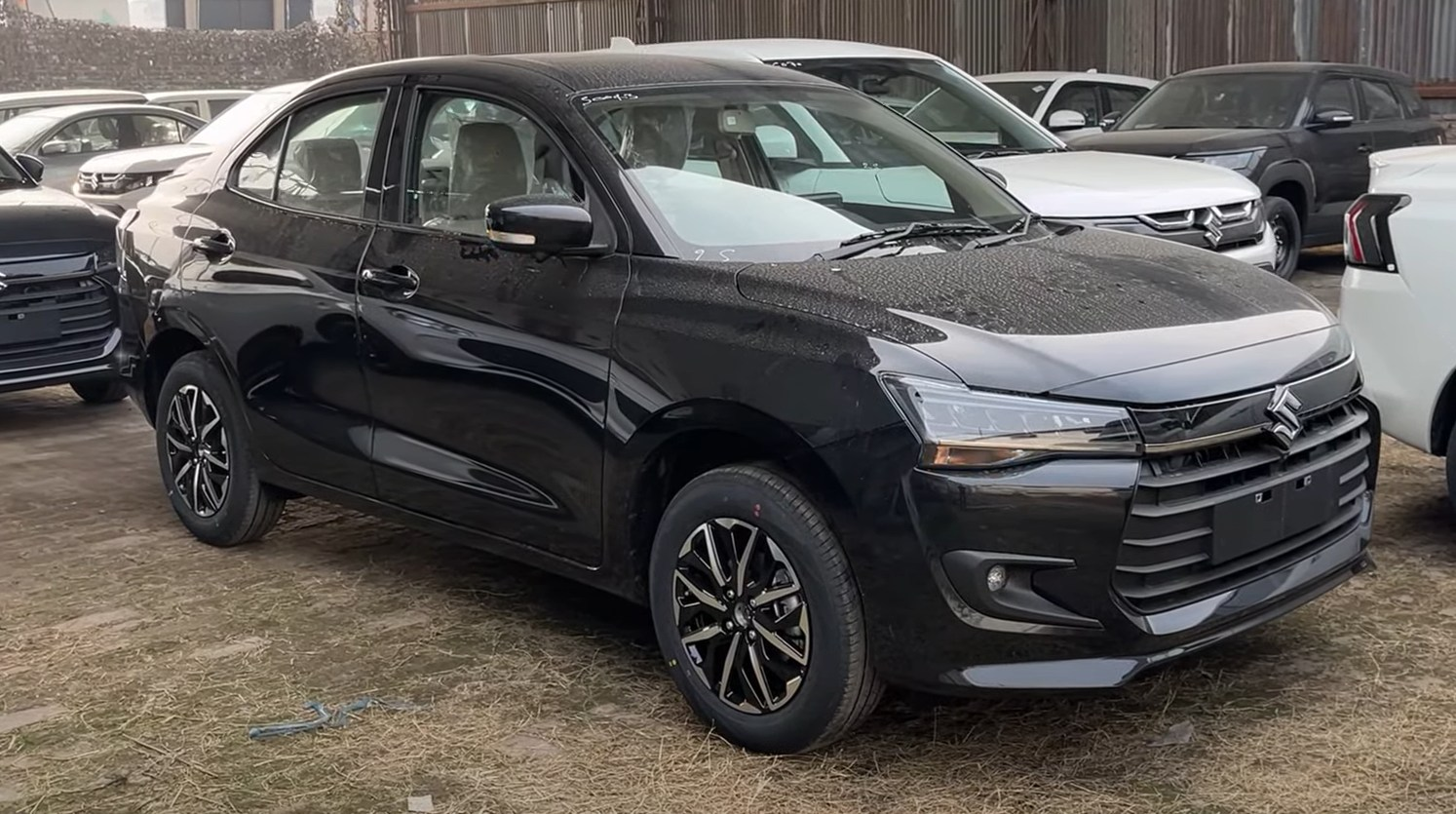
Suzuki Dzire

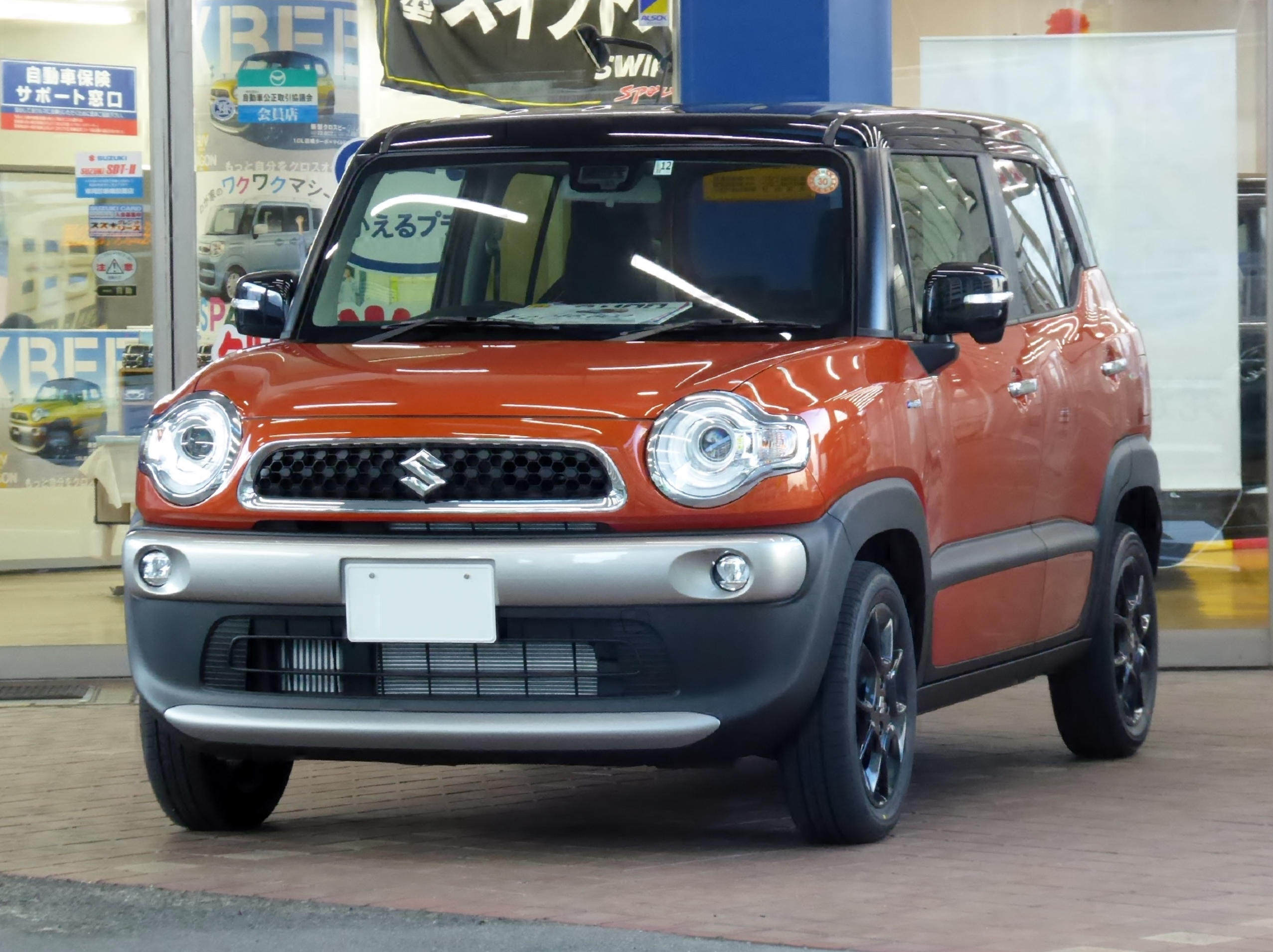
Suzuki Xbee

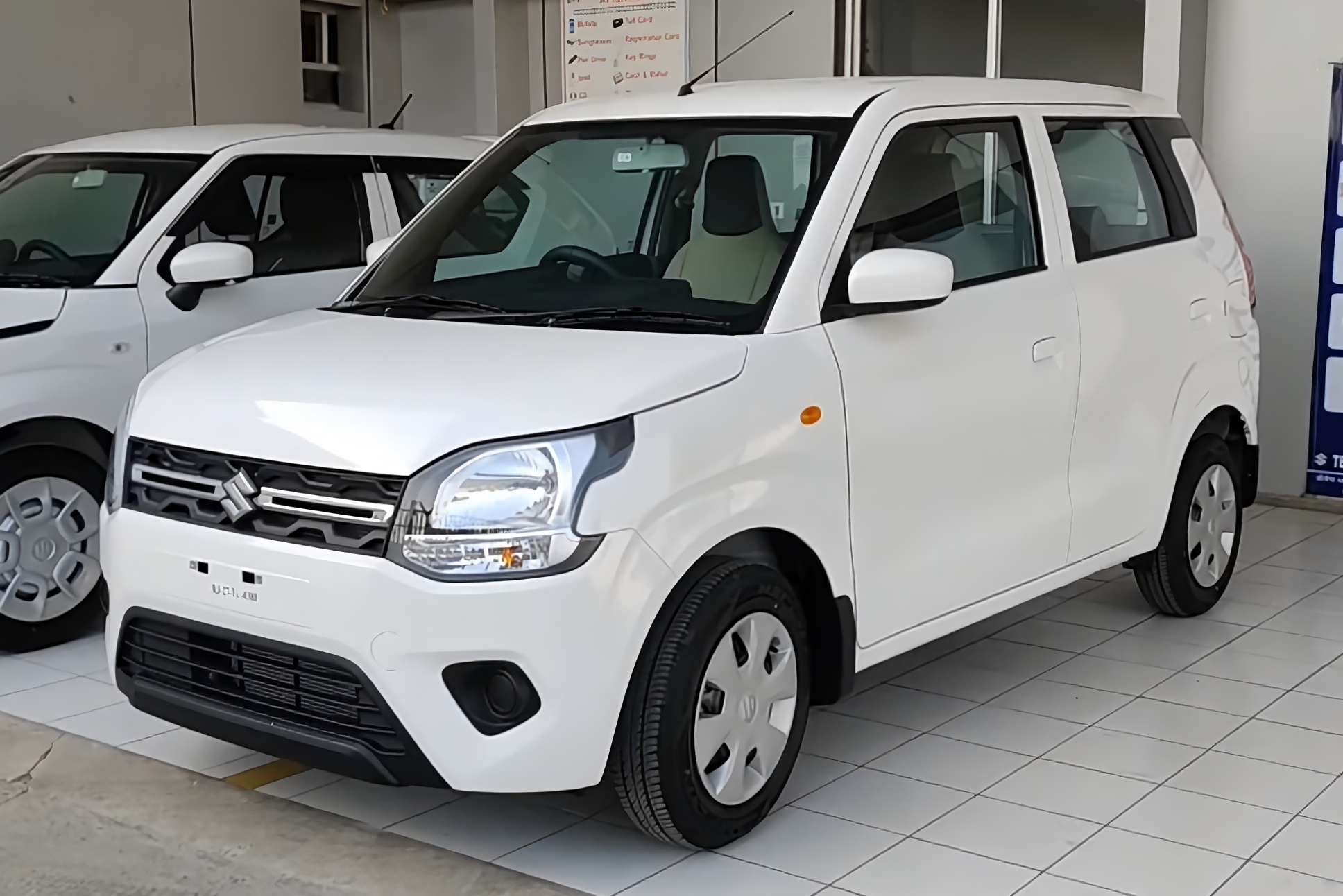
Maruti Suzuki Wagon R

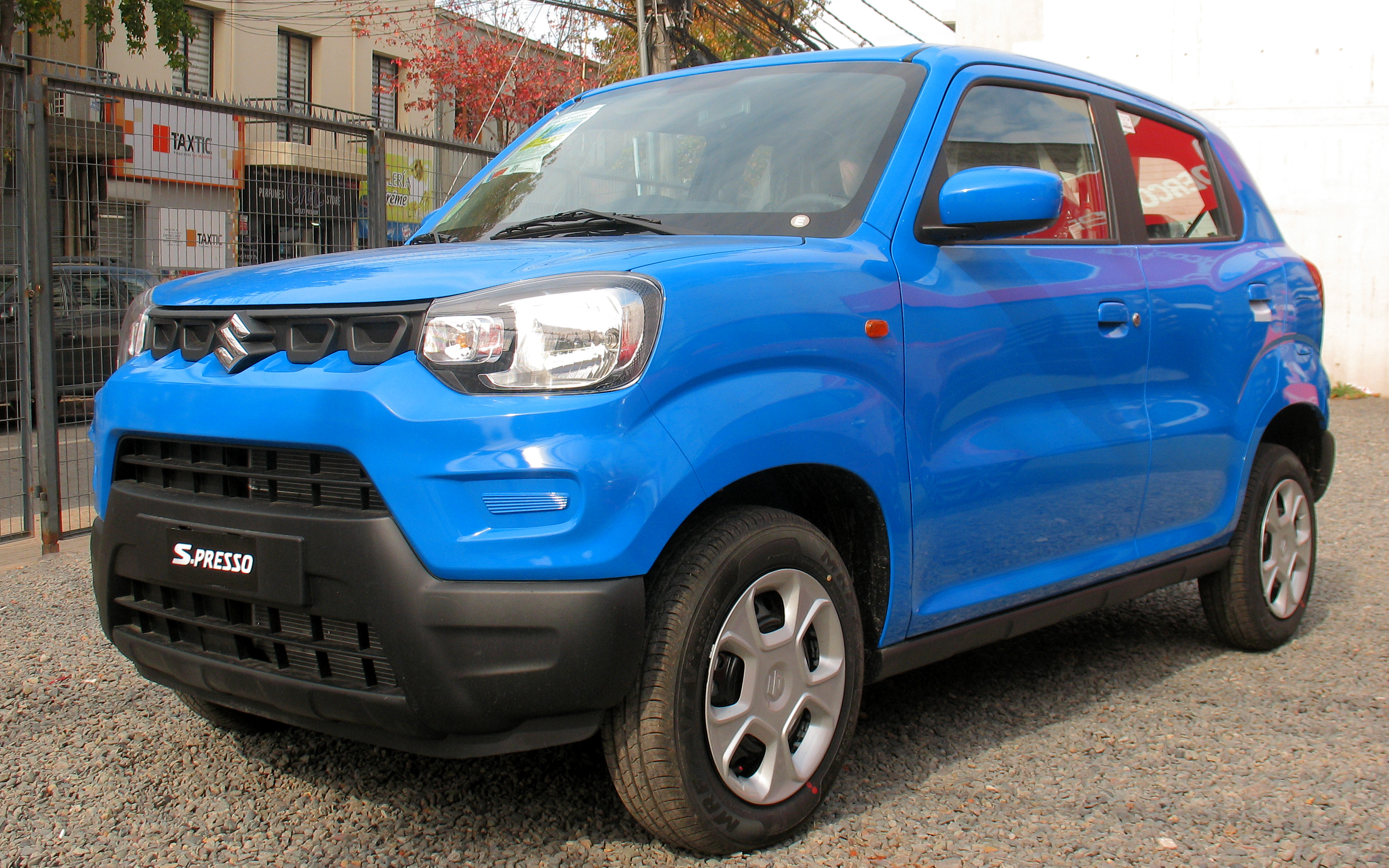
Suzuki S-Presso

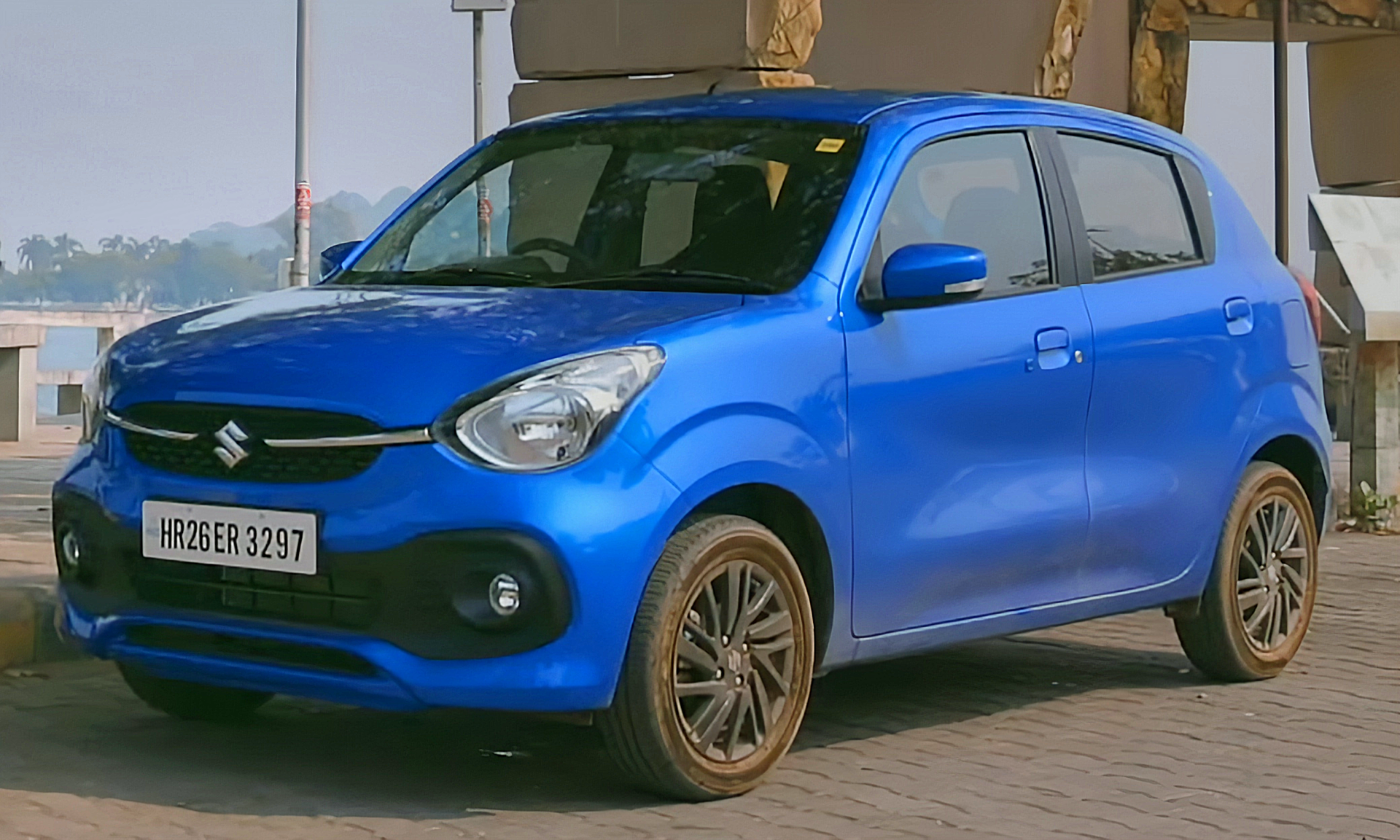
Suzuki Celerio

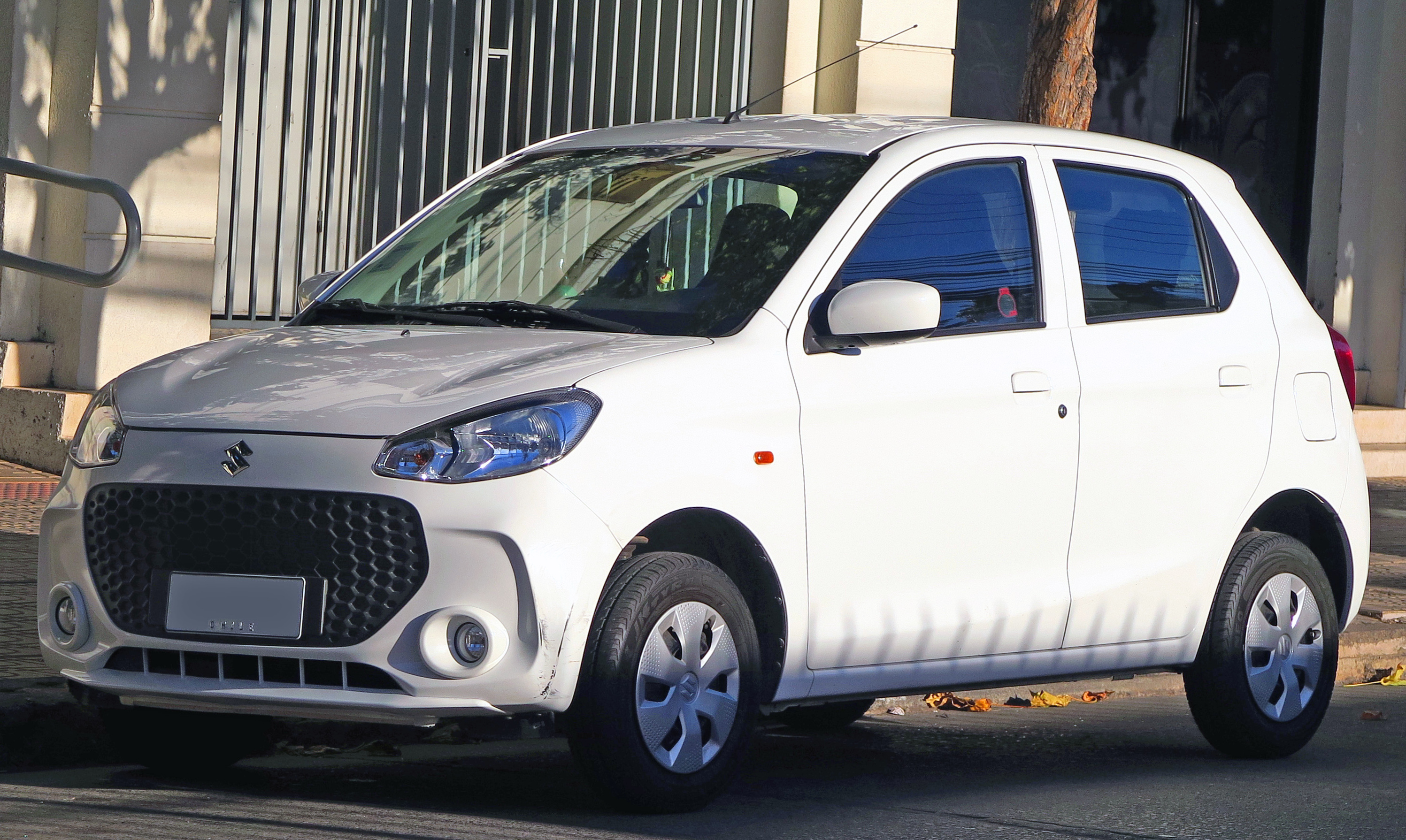
Maruti Suzuki Alto K10

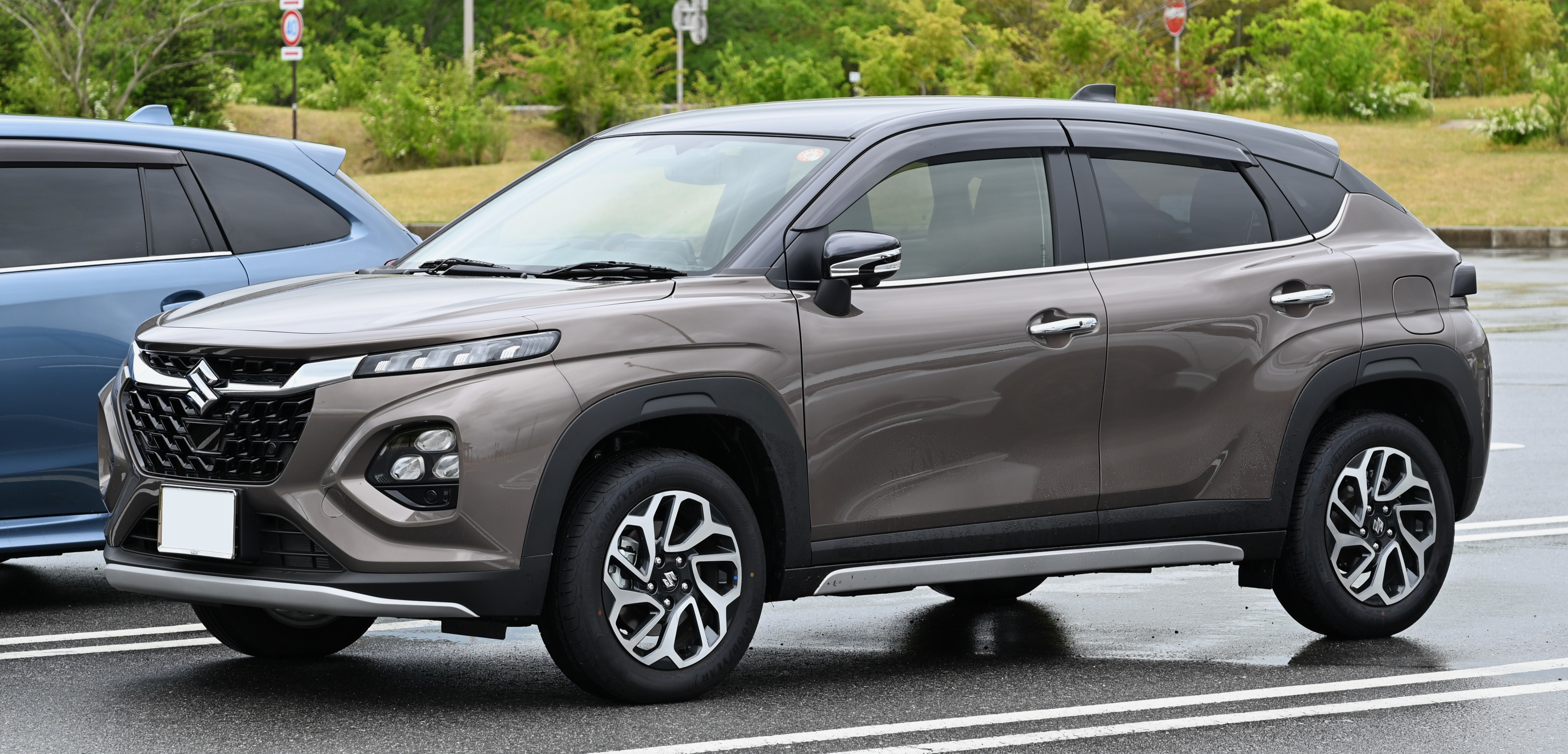
Suzuki Fronx

=== Compact cars ===
- Suzuki Ertiga / Toyota Rumion (2018–present)
- Suzuki XL6/XL7 (2019–present)
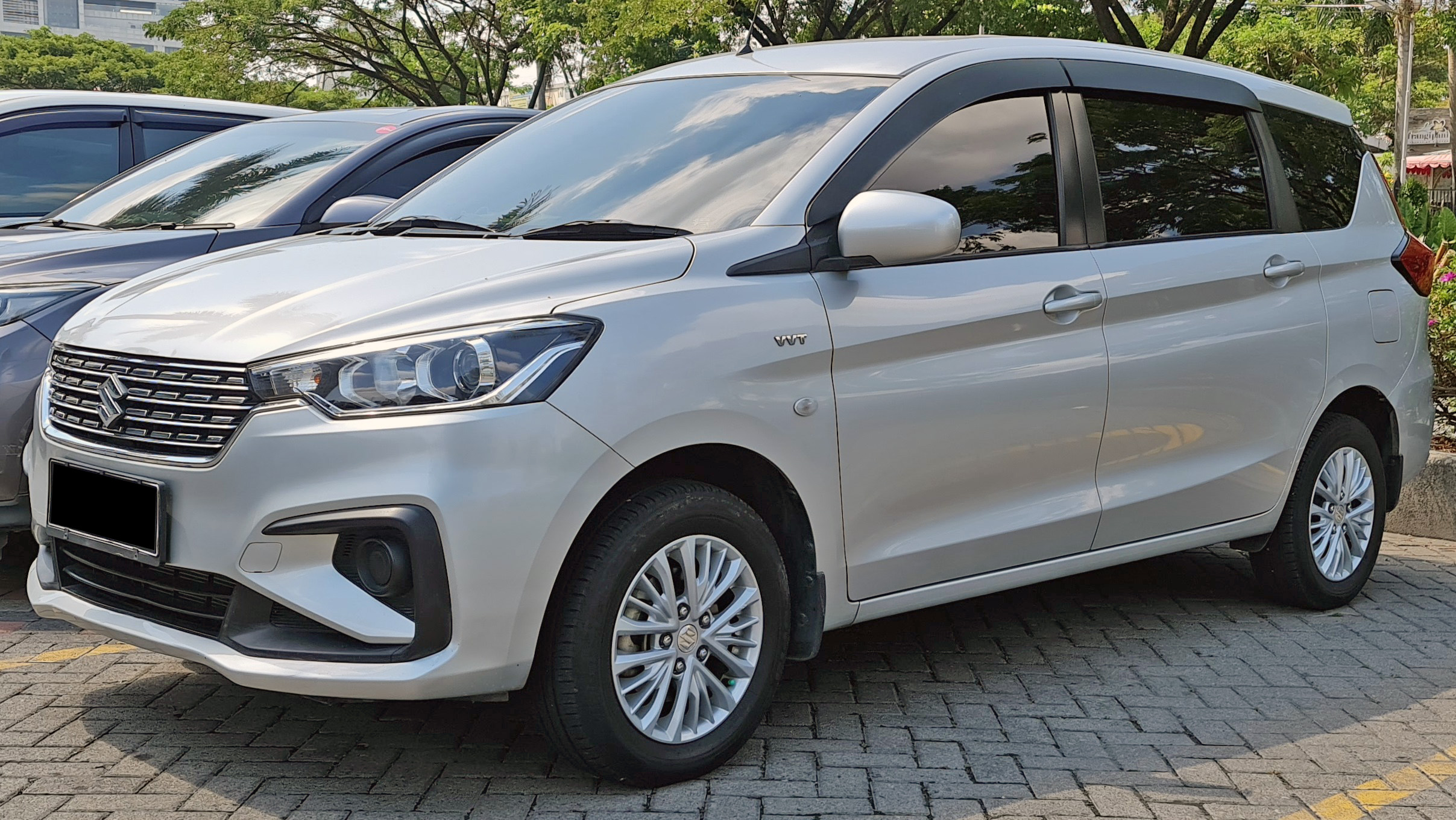
Suzuki Ertiga

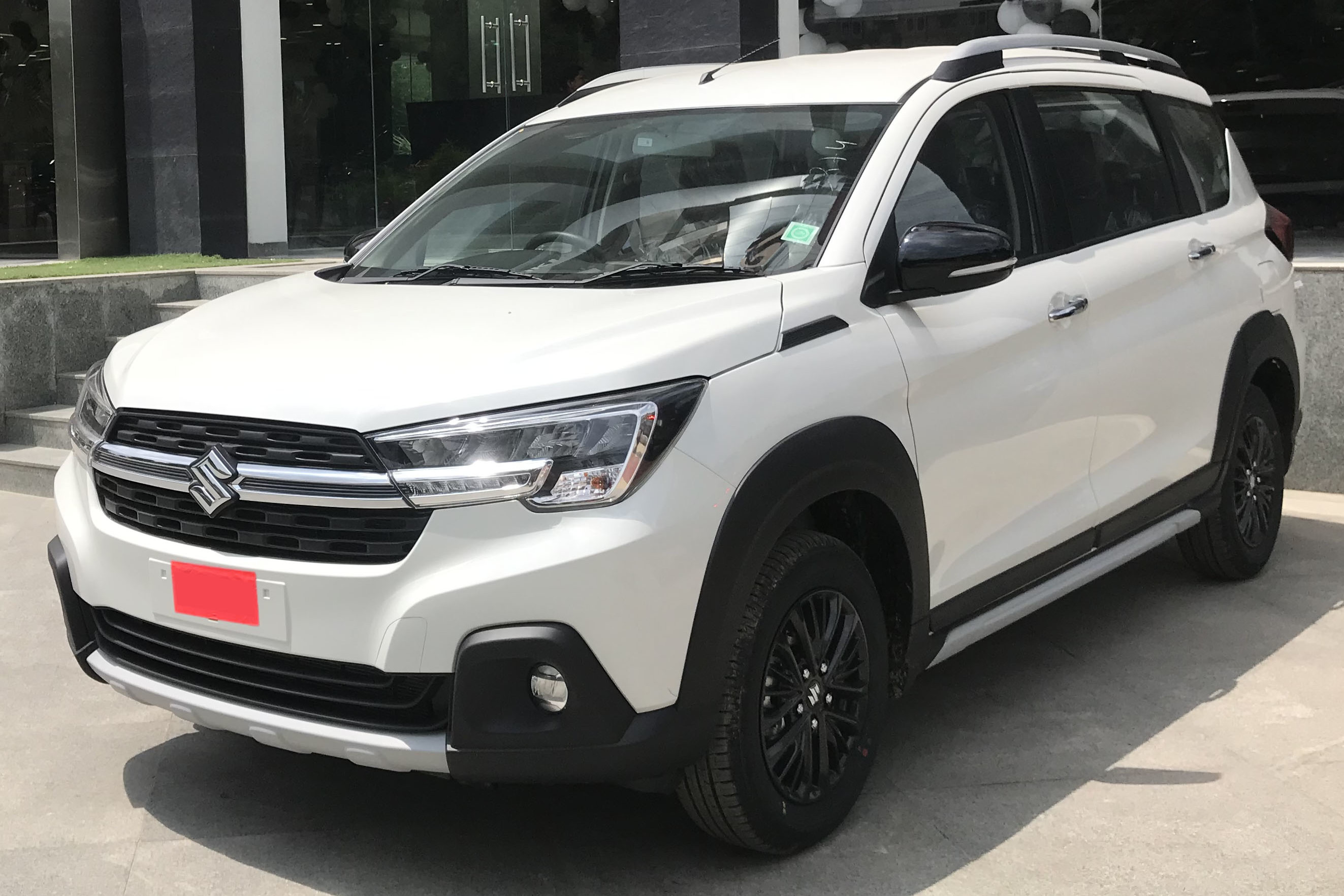
Suzuki XL6

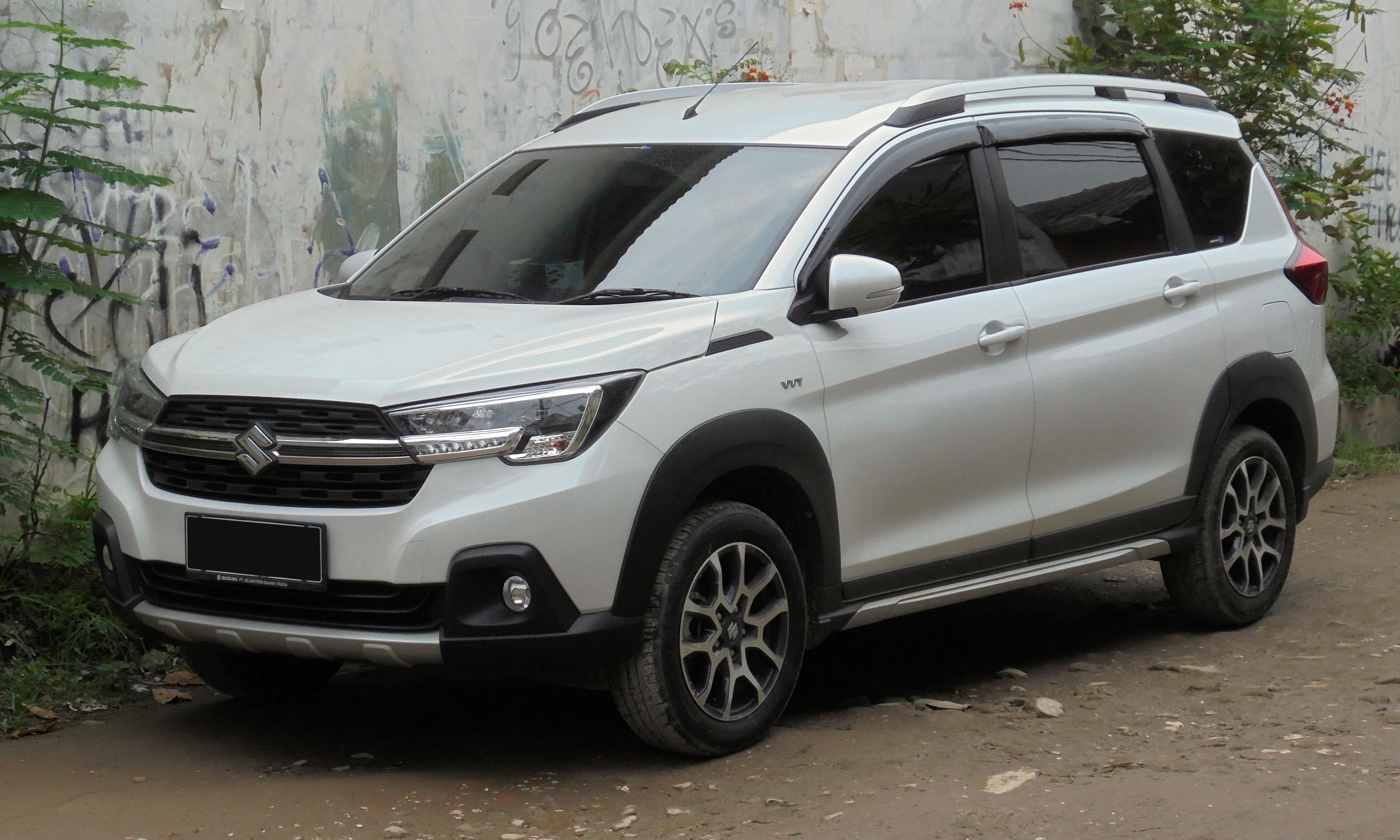
Suzuki XL7

=== Heartect-e ===
- Suzuki e Vitara / Toyota Urban Cruiser / Urban Cruiser Ebella (2025–present)
- Suzuki e Sky (2026–present)
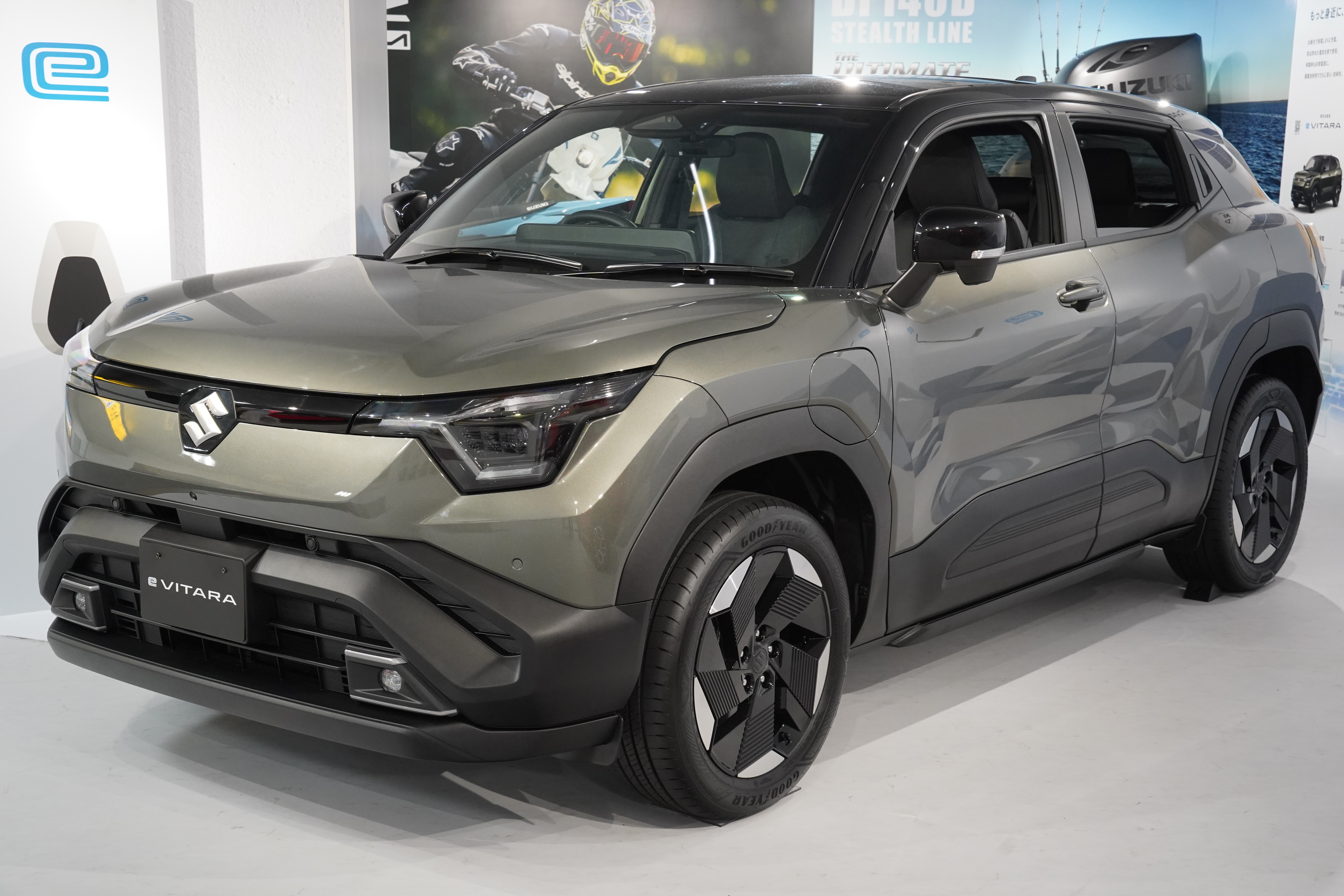
Suzuki e Vitara

Suzuki e Sky
