= Suzuki Wagon R =

Japanese mini car introduced in 1993

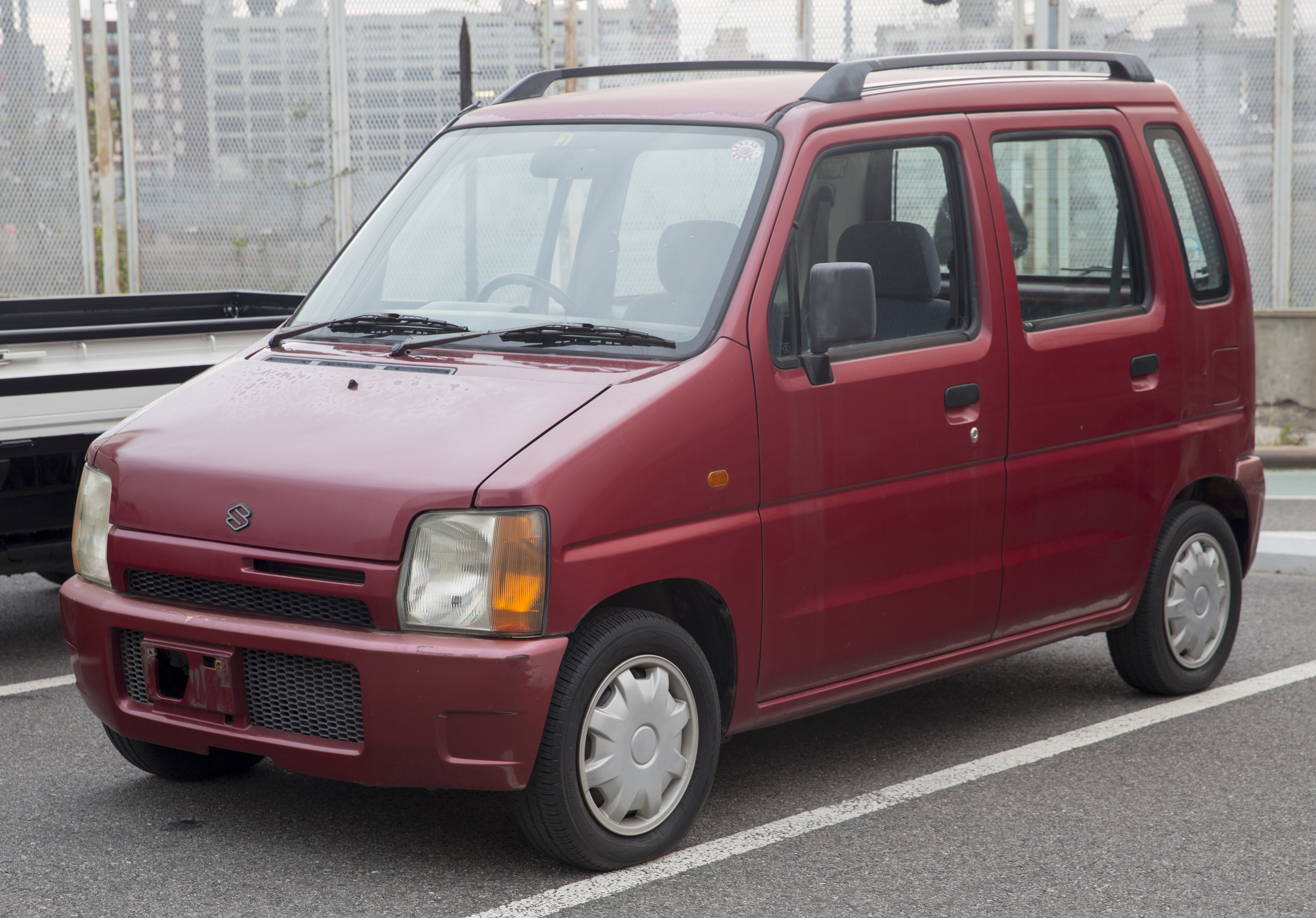
- First generation Wagon R

Overview
- Manufacturer: Suzuki
- Also called: Mazda AZ-Wagon (1994–2012); Mazda Flair (2012–present)
- Production: 1993–present
- Assembly: Japan: Kosai, Shizuoka (Kosai Assembly Plant)

Body and chassis
- Class: Kei car
- Body style: 4/5-door hatchback
- Layout: Front-engine, front-wheel-drive; Front-engine, four-wheel-drive
- Related: Suzuki Palette; Suzuki Spacia; Suzuki Solio; Maruti Suzuki Wagon R; Changhe Beidouxing; Suzuki Wagon R Smile

The Suzuki Wagon R (Japanese: スズキ・ワゴンR, Suzuki Wagon'āru) is a kei car manufactured and marketed by Suzuki since 1993. The R in the name stands for Revolution and Relaxation. The Wagon R uses a "tall wagon" configuration to maximize cabin space within kei car dimensional restrictions. The Wagon R is also sold by Mazda as the AZ-Wagon from 1994 to 2012 and as the Flair from 2012.

The Wagon R has been the best-selling kei car in Japan since 2003. In 2008, Suzuki produced its three-millionth Wagon R. Sales reached 5 million at the end of February 2010.

== First generation (CT21S/CT51S/CV21S/CV51S; 1993) ==
First generation
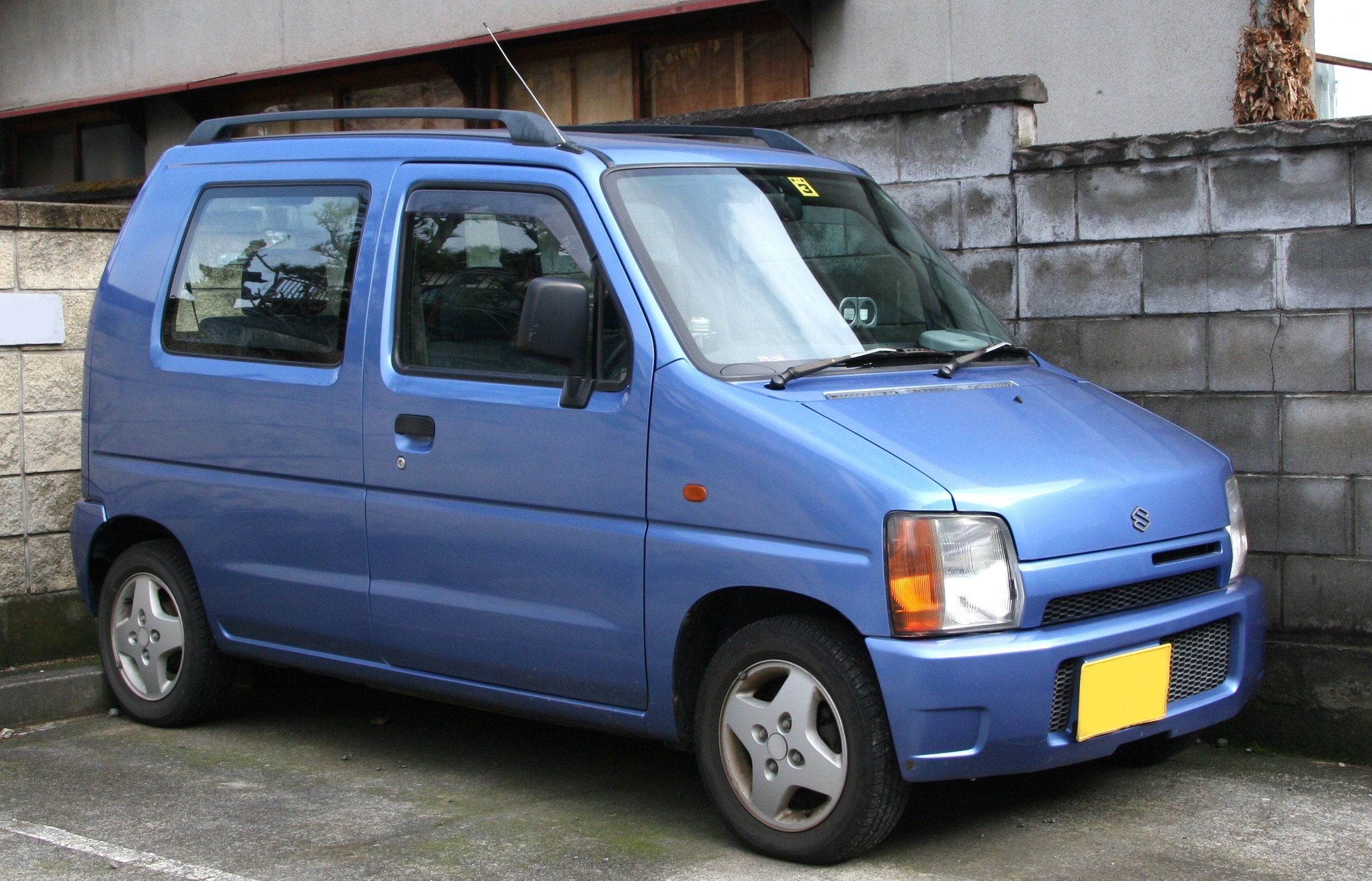
- First generation Wagon R 4-door (right-hand side)

Overview
- Model code: CT21S/CT51S/CV21S/CV51S
- Also called: Autozam AZ Wagon; Mazda AZ Wagon
- Production: September 1993 – October 1998

Body and chassis
- Body style: 4/5-door hatchback

Powertrain
- Engine: 657 cc F6A SOHC I3; 657 cc F6A SOHC turbo I3; 658 cc K6A DOHC I3; 658 cc K6A DOHC turbo I3
- Transmission: 3-speed automatic 4-speed automatic 5-speed manual

Dimensions
- Wheelbase: 2,335 mm (91.9 in)
- Length: 3,295 mm (129.7 in)
- Width: 1,395 mm (54.9 in)
- Height: 1,640–1,695 mm (64.6–66.7 in)
- Curb weight: 720–820 kg (1,587–1,808 lb)

The first generation Wagon R is 1,640 mm (64.6 in) high, or 255 mm (10.0 in) taller (170 mm (6.7 in) internally) than the JDM Suzuki Alto sold at the same time (which was exactly the same length and width, as dictated by the Kei class regulations). The R used the same 660 cc F6A three-cylinder engines as did the Alto and other Suzuki kei cars. The car was developed with low cost manufacturing in mind, with 70 percent parts commonality (by value) with the related Alto.

Originally with two doors on the left side and a single door on the right (driver's) side, it was introduced at the 1993 Tokyo Motor Show. In August 1996 the more common, symmetrical five-door setup became available and soon supplanted the earlier body style. For model year 1994, it won the Automotive Researchers' and Journalists' Conference Car of the Year award in Japan. The Wagon R was an unexpected runaway success, with 900,000 examples of the first generation sold in the Japanese home market - even outselling perennial bestseller Toyota Corolla on occasion.

The rebadged Autozam AZ Wagon was presented in September 1994. Also using the F6A engine, this model was marketed through Mazda's Autozam network as part of an OEM deal. After April 1997, this was sold as the "Mazda AZ Wagon".

A bigger first generation Wagon R, the Suzuki Wagon R+, was added in early 1997 and manufactured in Japan until the end of 2000 for the European market. The car featured a wider body and the K10A naturally aspirated engine with 996 cc and four-cylinders. The same Wagon R+ was also available with a 1.2-litre K12A engine.

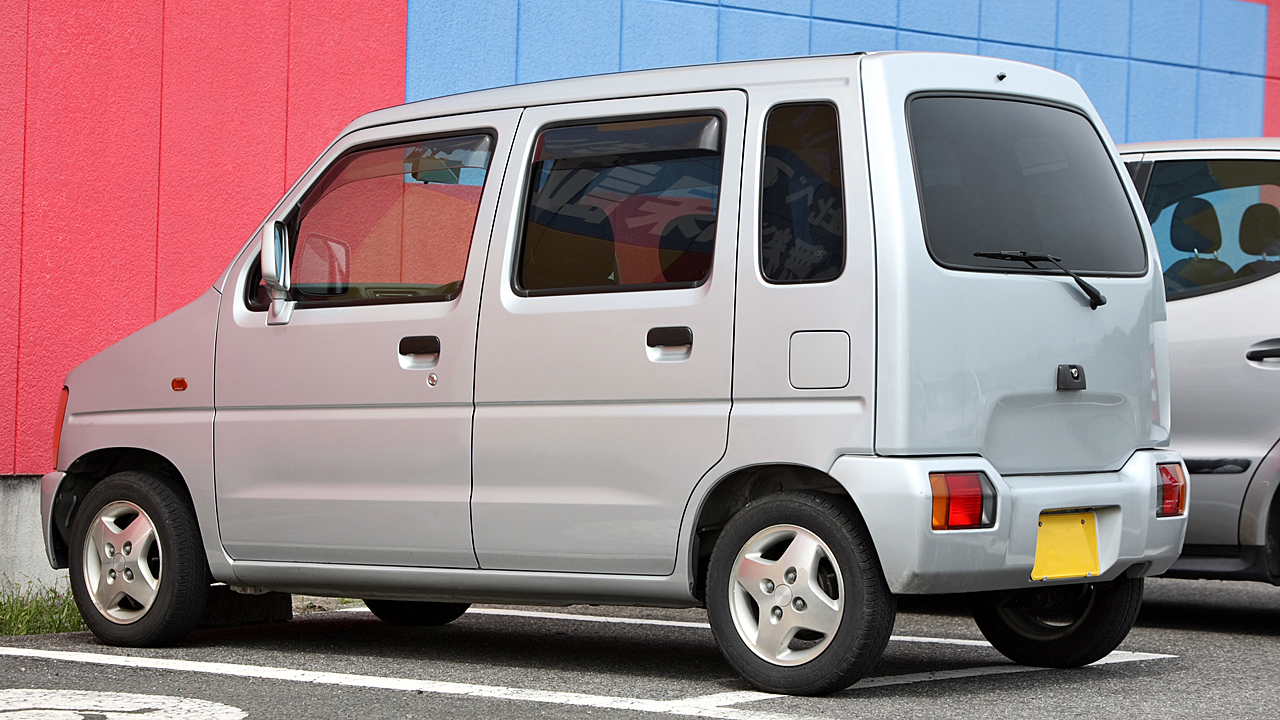
Rear view (5-door)

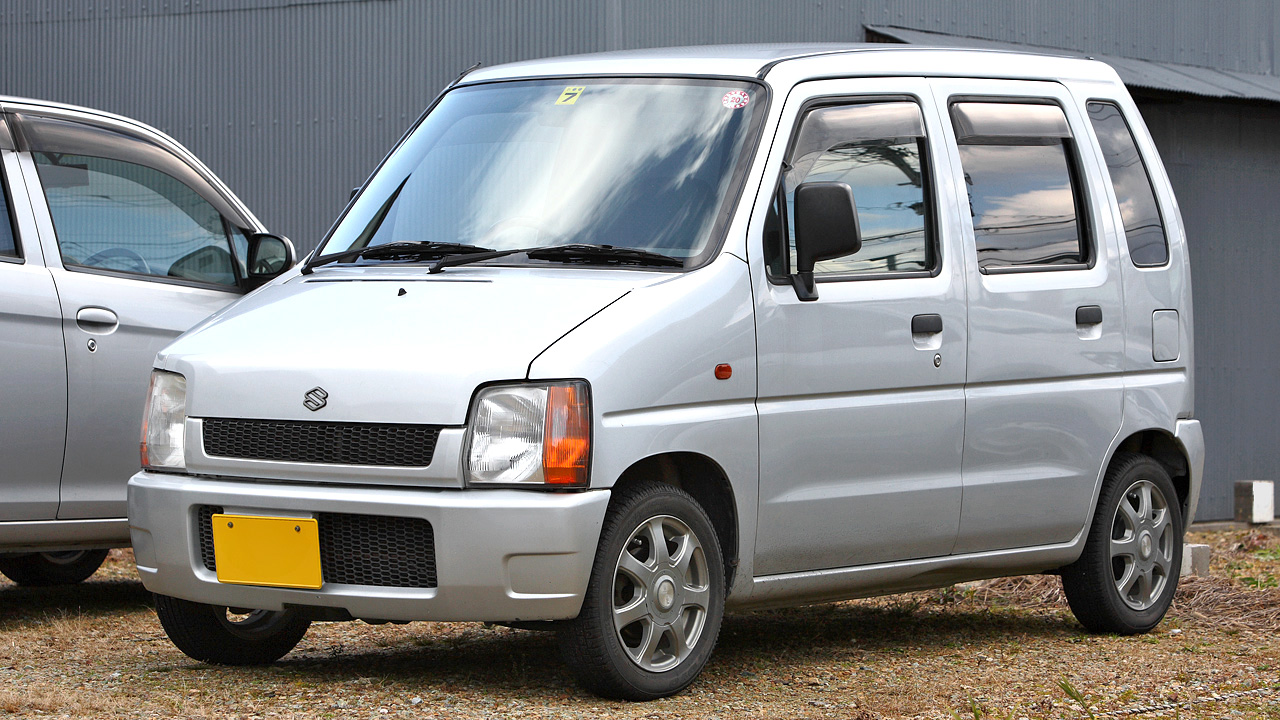
Suzuki Wagon R (facelift)

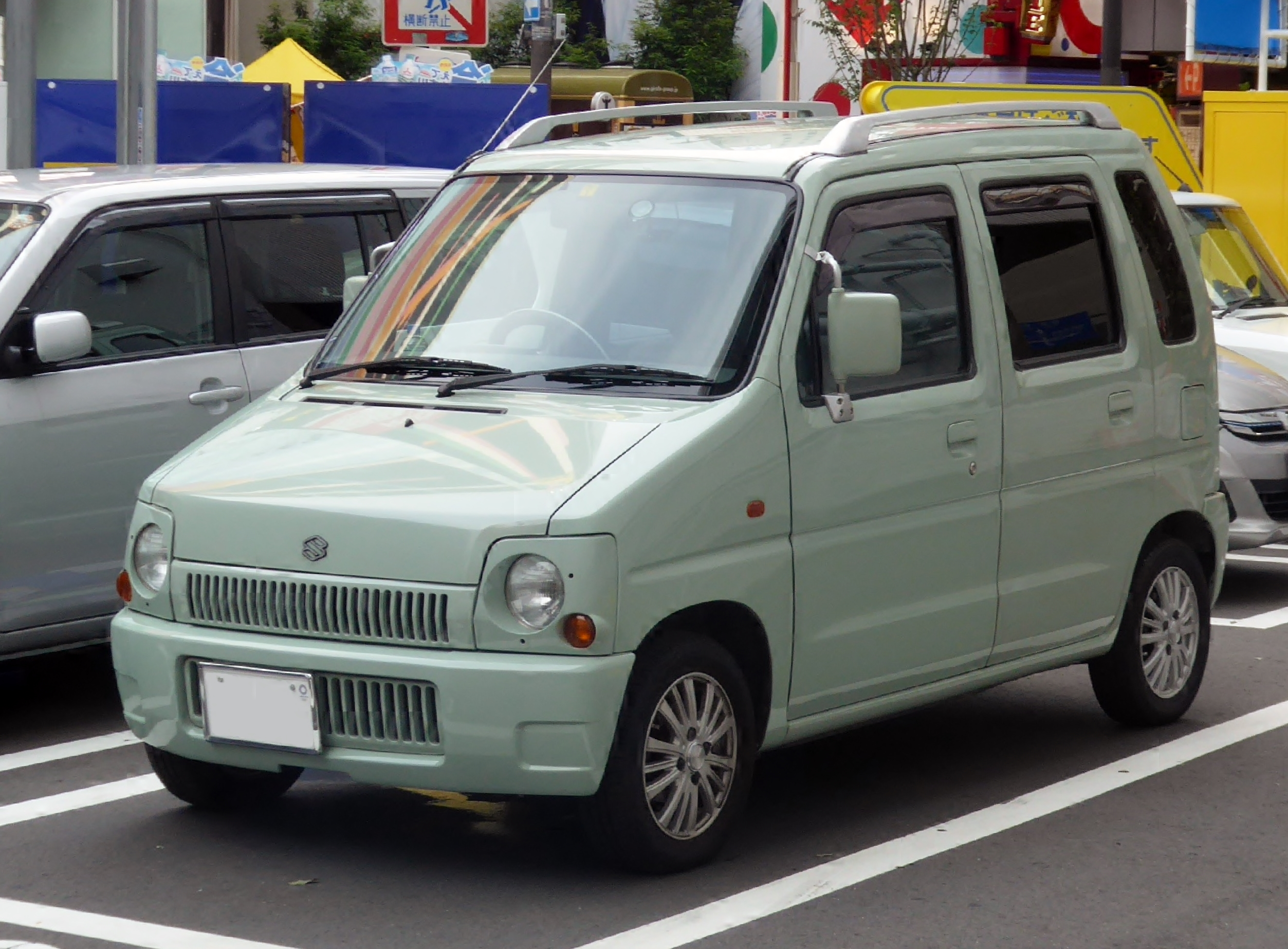
1998 Wagon R Column

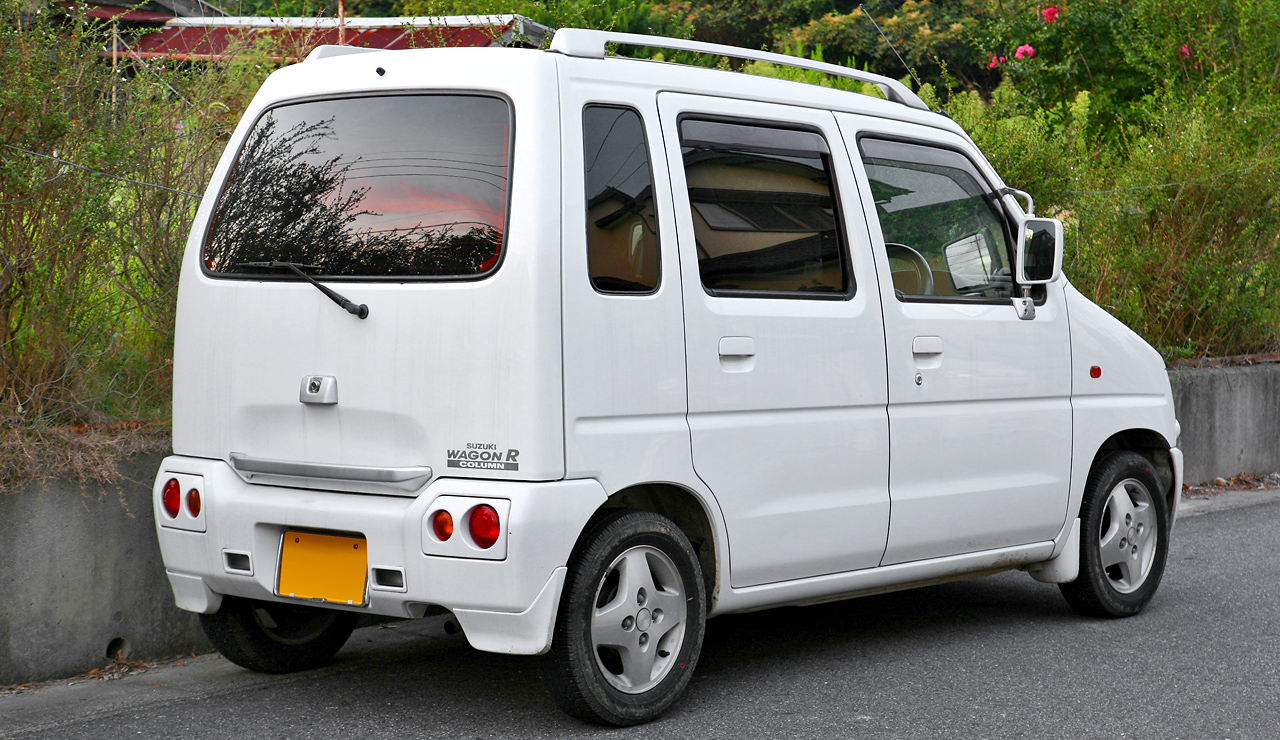
1998 Wagon R Column

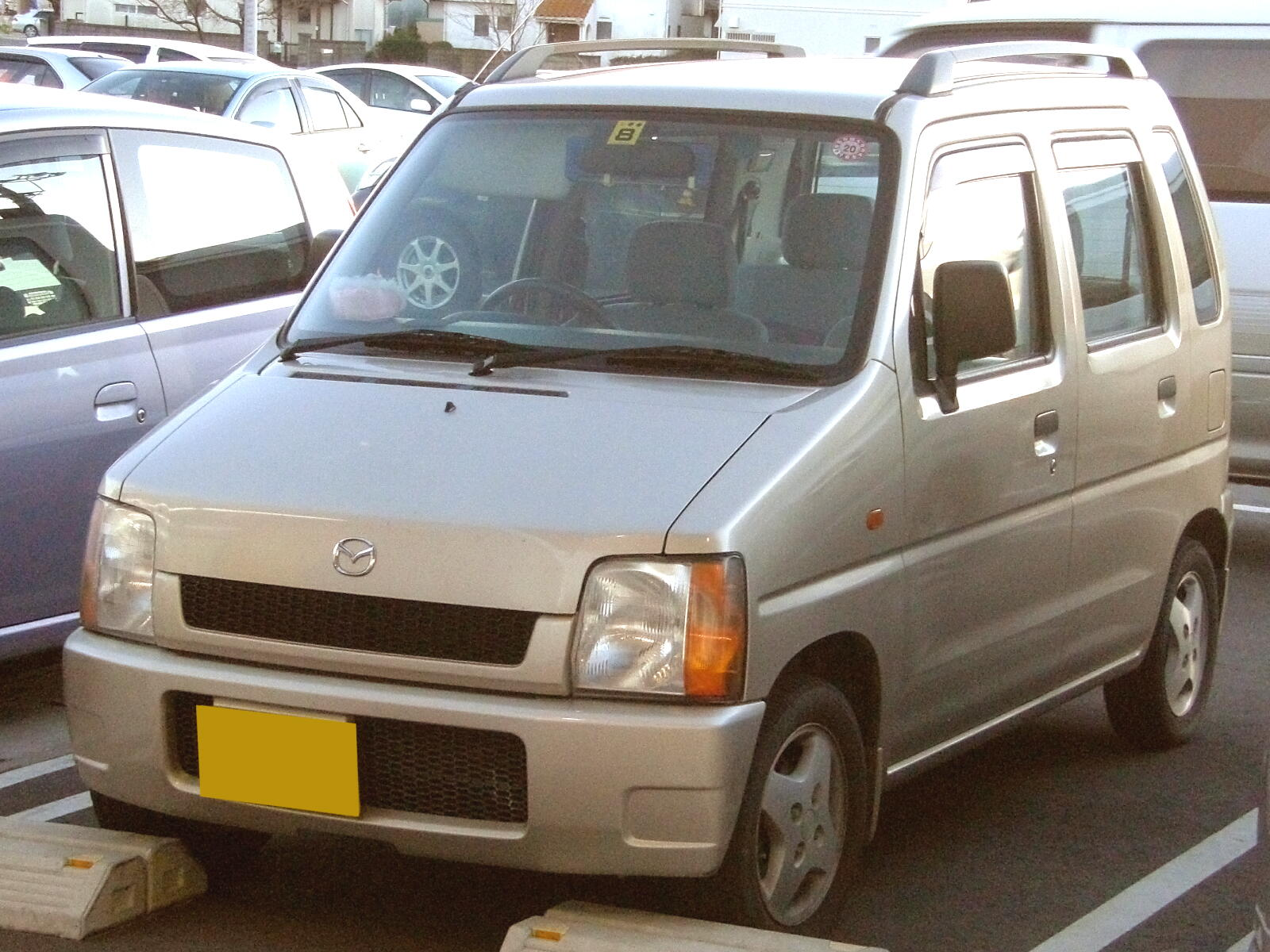
1997 Mazda AZ Wagon

== Second generation (MC11S/12S/21S/22S; 1998) ==
Second generation
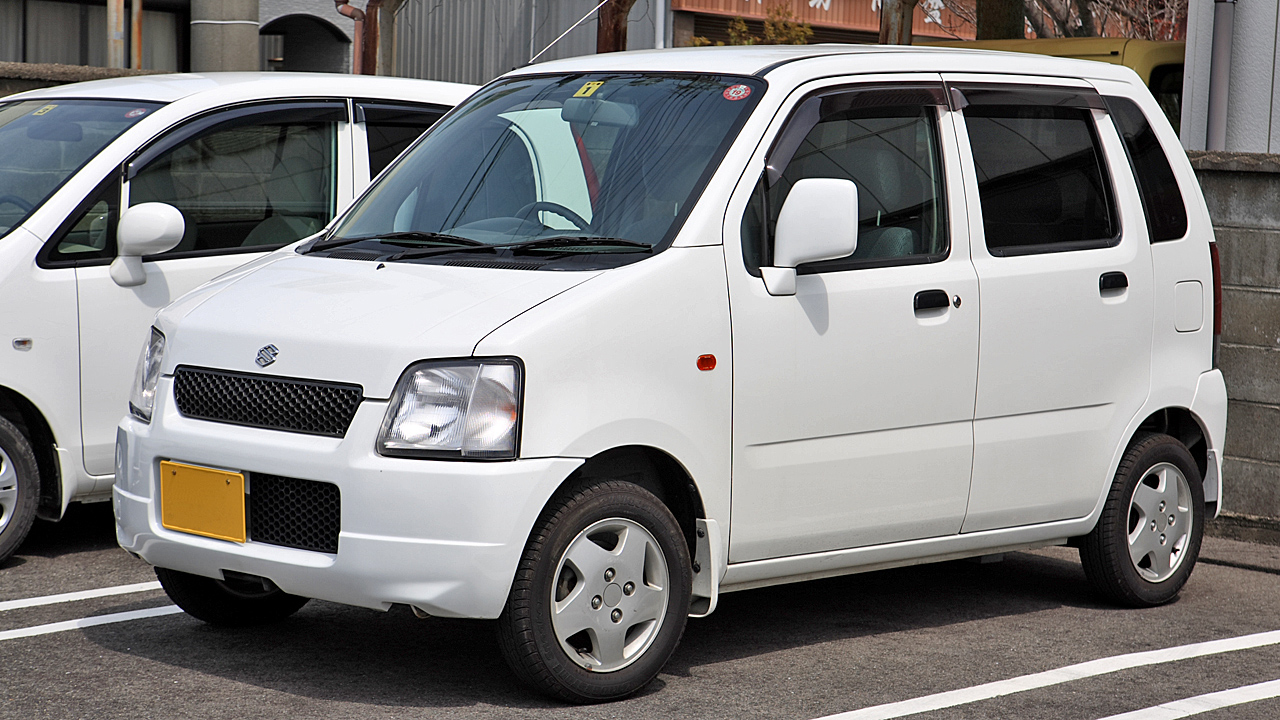
- Second generation Suzuki Wagon R (pre-facelift)

Overview
- Model code: MC11S/MC12S/MC21S/MC22S
- Also called: Mazda AZ Wagon
- Production: October 1998 – September 2003

Body and chassis
- Body style: 4/5-door hatchback
- Related: Maruti Suzuki Wagon R (first generation)

Powertrain
- Engine: 657 cc F6A SOHC I3; 657 cc F6A SOHC turbo I3; 658 cc K6A DOHC I3; 658 cc K6A DOHC turbo I3
- Transmission: 5-speed manual 3/4-speed automatic CVT

Dimensions
- Wheelbase: 2,360 mm (92.9 in)
- Length: 3,395 mm (133.7 in)
- Width: 1,475 mm (58.1 in)
- Height: 1,640–1,685 mm (64.6–66.3 in)
- Curb weight: 730–900 kg (1,609–1,984 lb)

1998 saw the introduction of the second-generation Wagon R in Japan.

The larger (non-kei) Wagon R+ was replaced in 1999 - this was brought to Europe in 2000, with larger engines and was sold as the Suzuki Wagon R+. This larger version is also produced in Esztergom in Hungary by Magyar Suzuki and in Gurgaon, India by Maruti Suzuki. The Opel Agila is a badge engineered version of the Suzuki Wagon R-Wide, also introduced in summer 2000. This generation of Maruti Suzuki Wagon R in India was produced until 2010.

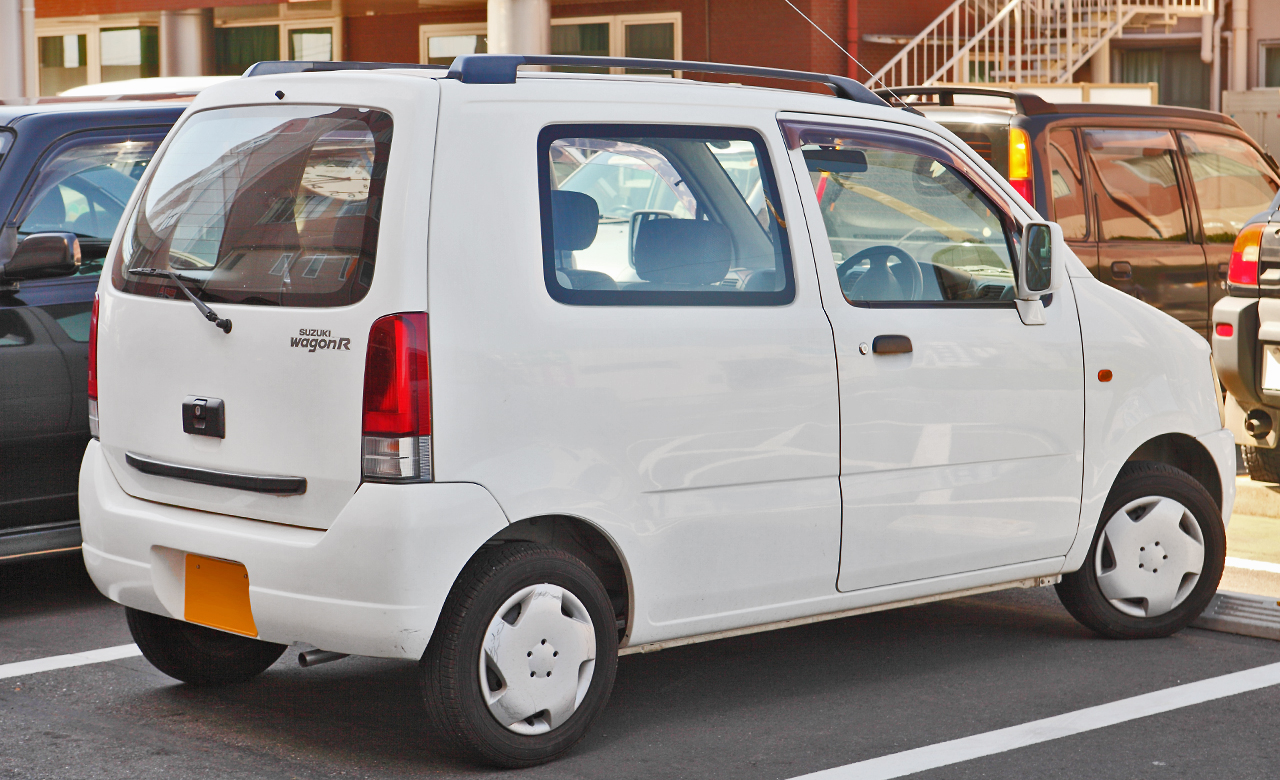
Rear view (4-door, pre-facelift)

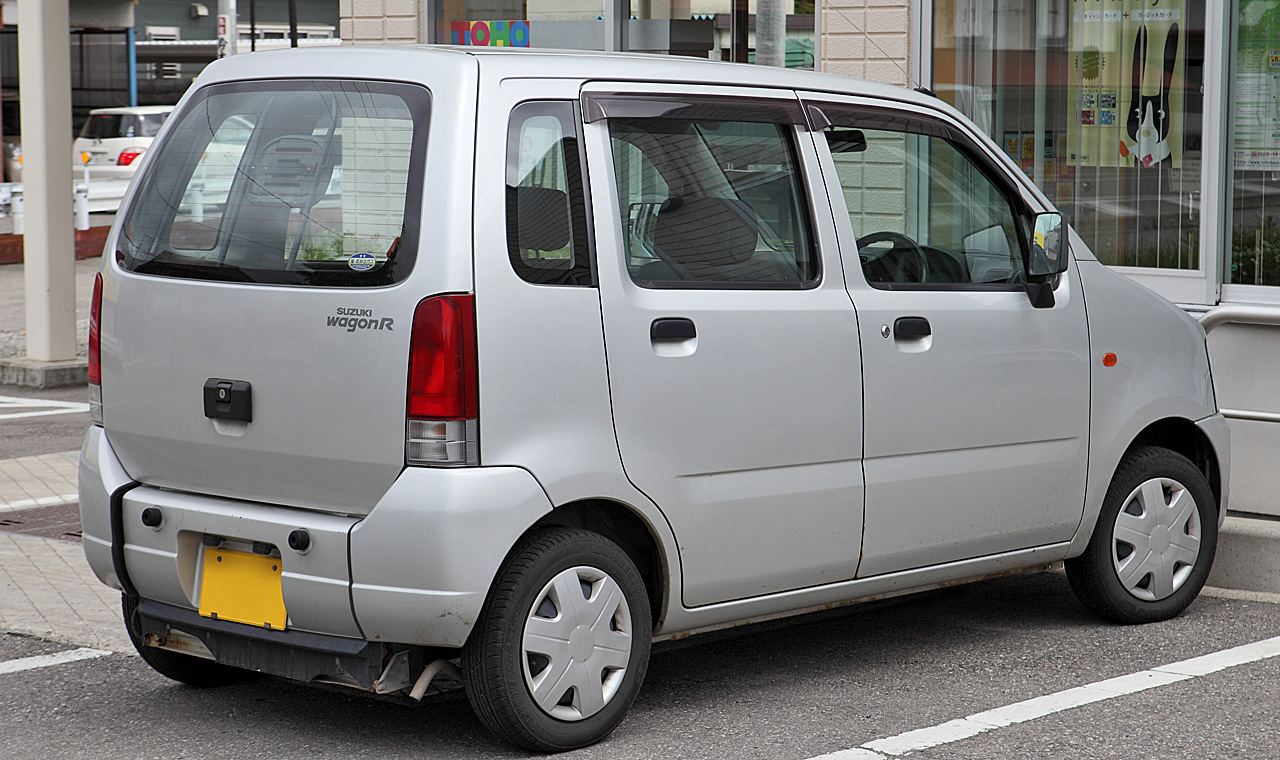
Rear view (5-door, pre-facelift)

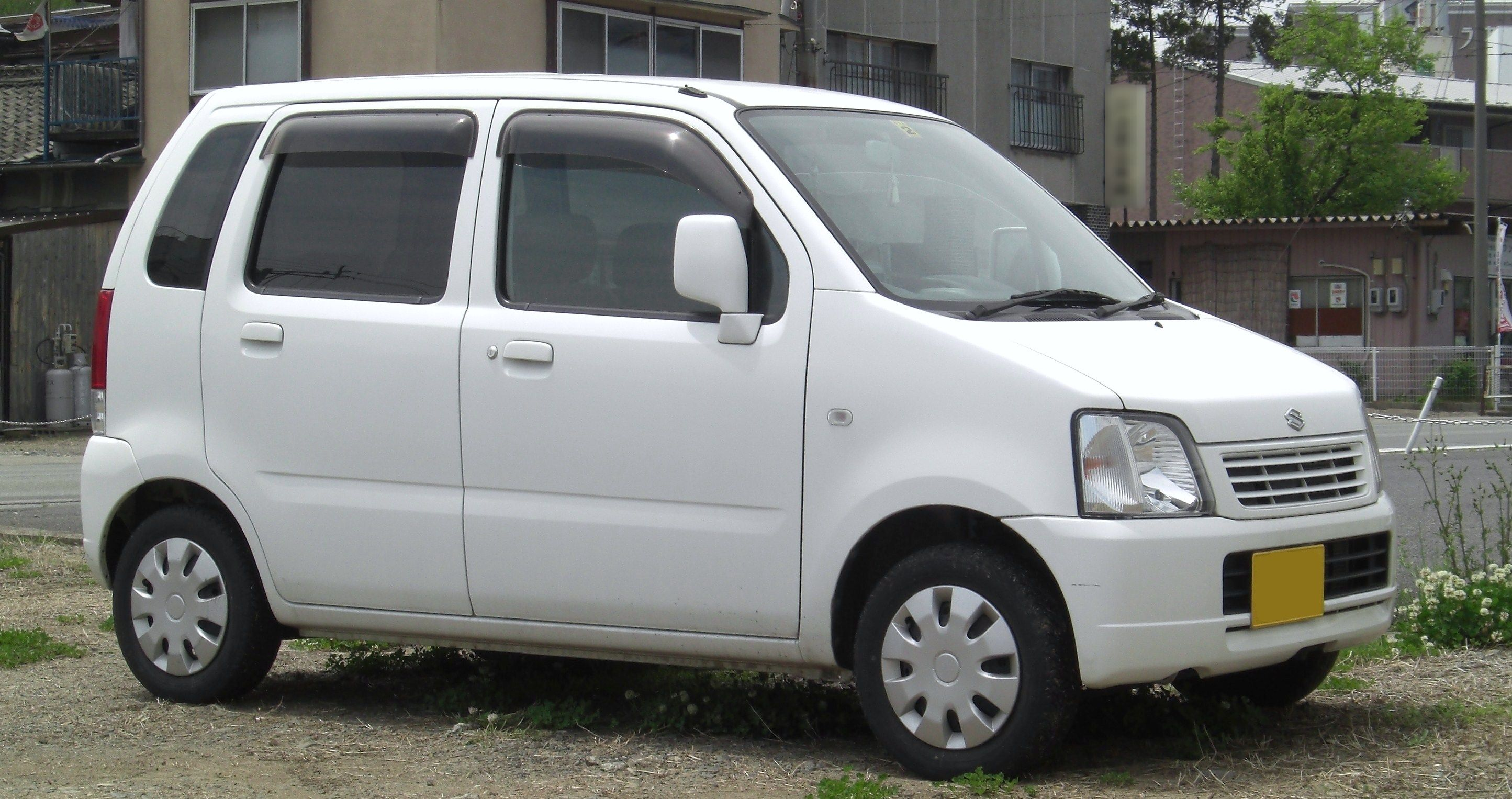
Suzuki Wagon R (facelift)

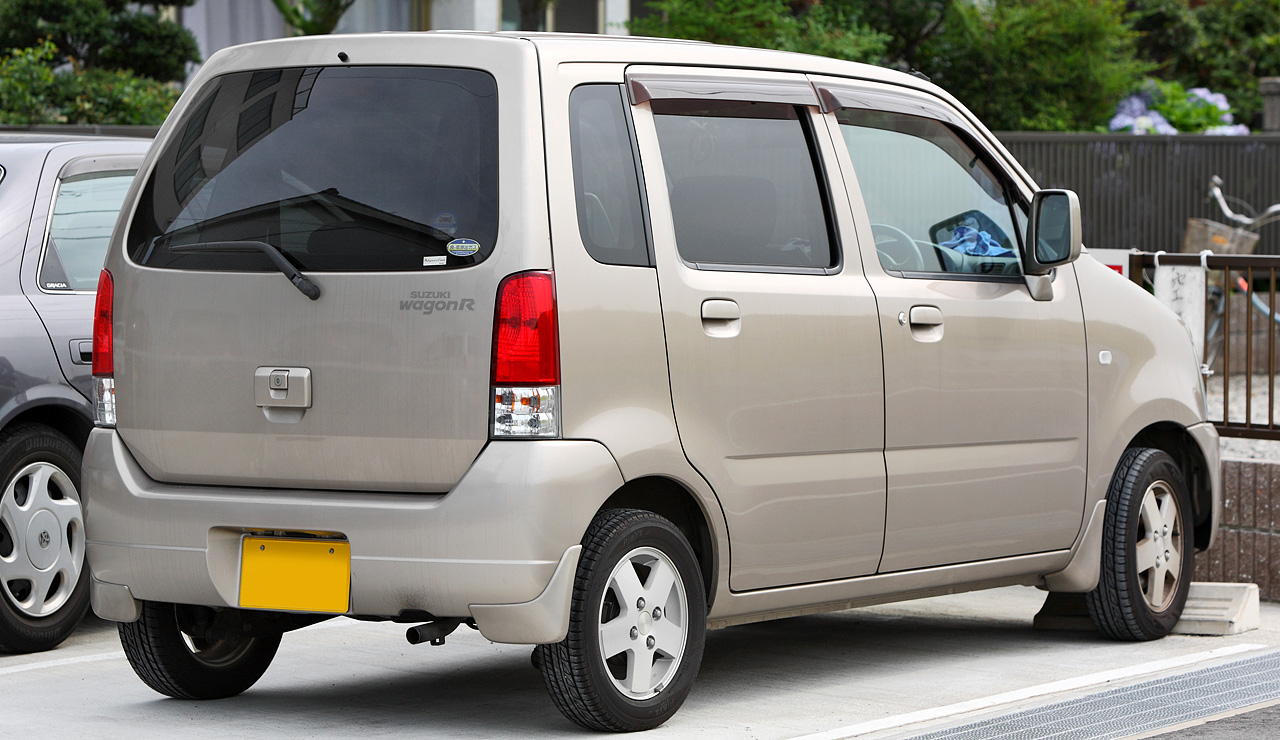
Suzuki Wagon R (facelift)

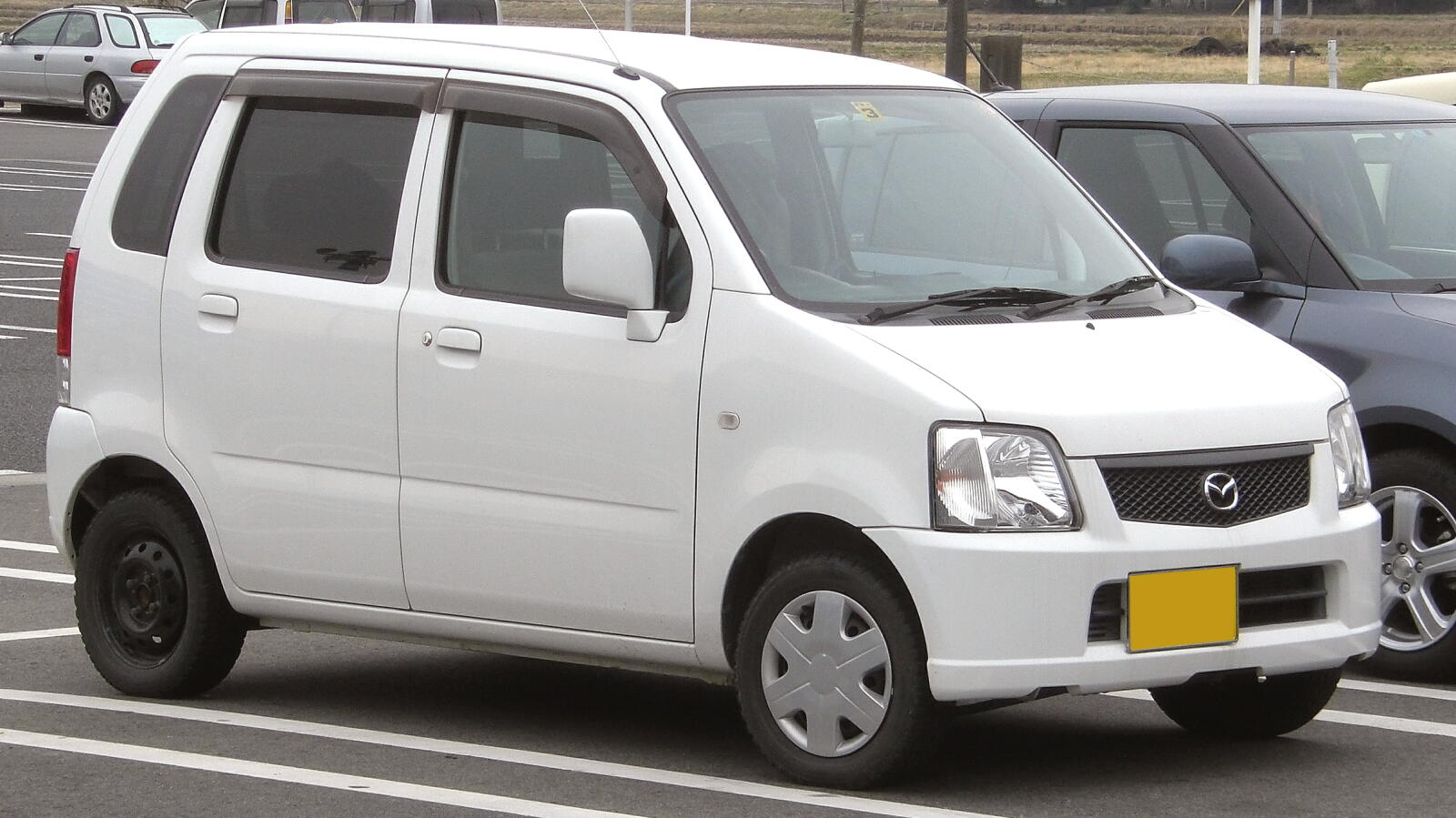
Mazda AZ Wagon (facelift)

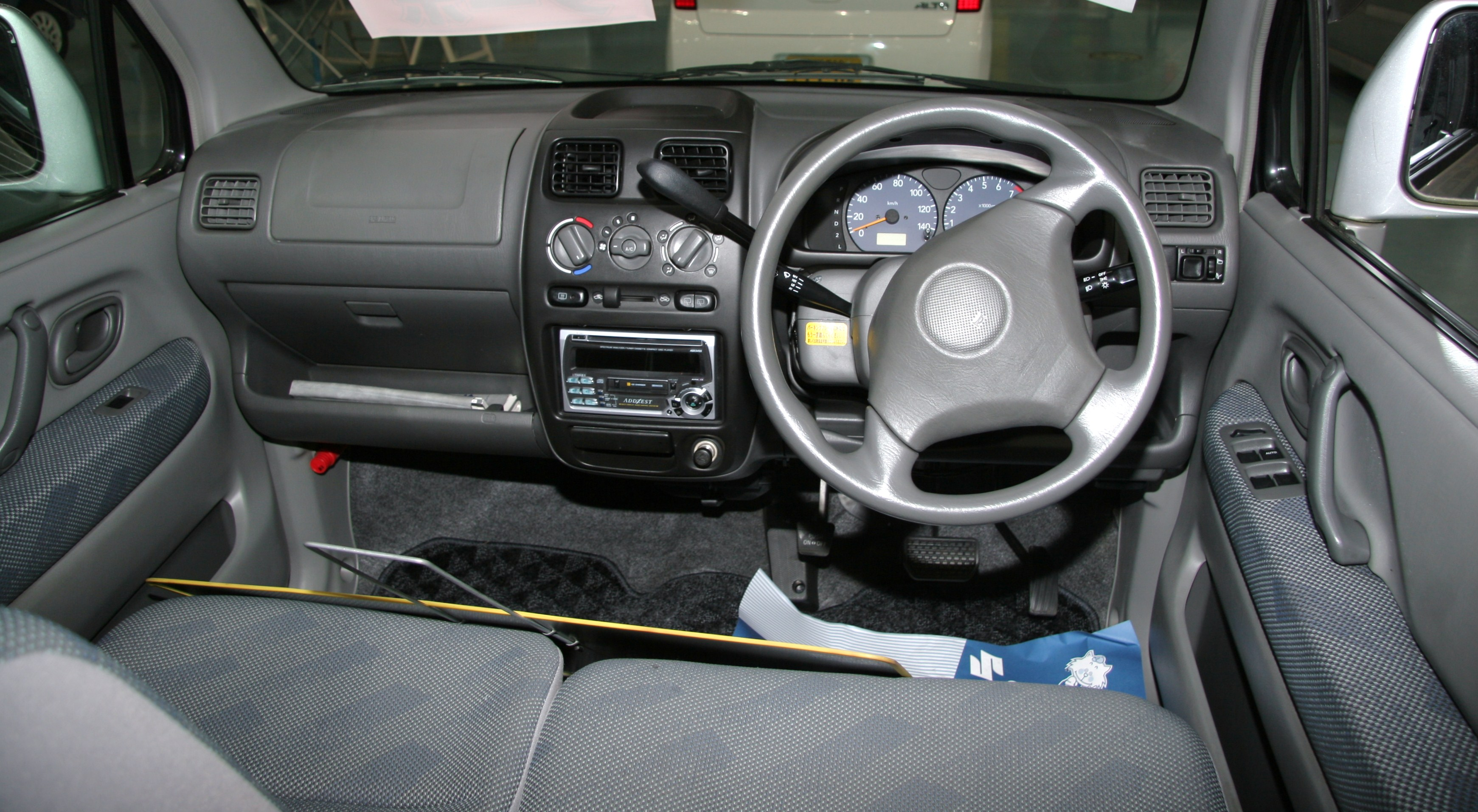
Interior

== Third generation (MH21S/MH22S; 2003) ==
Third generation
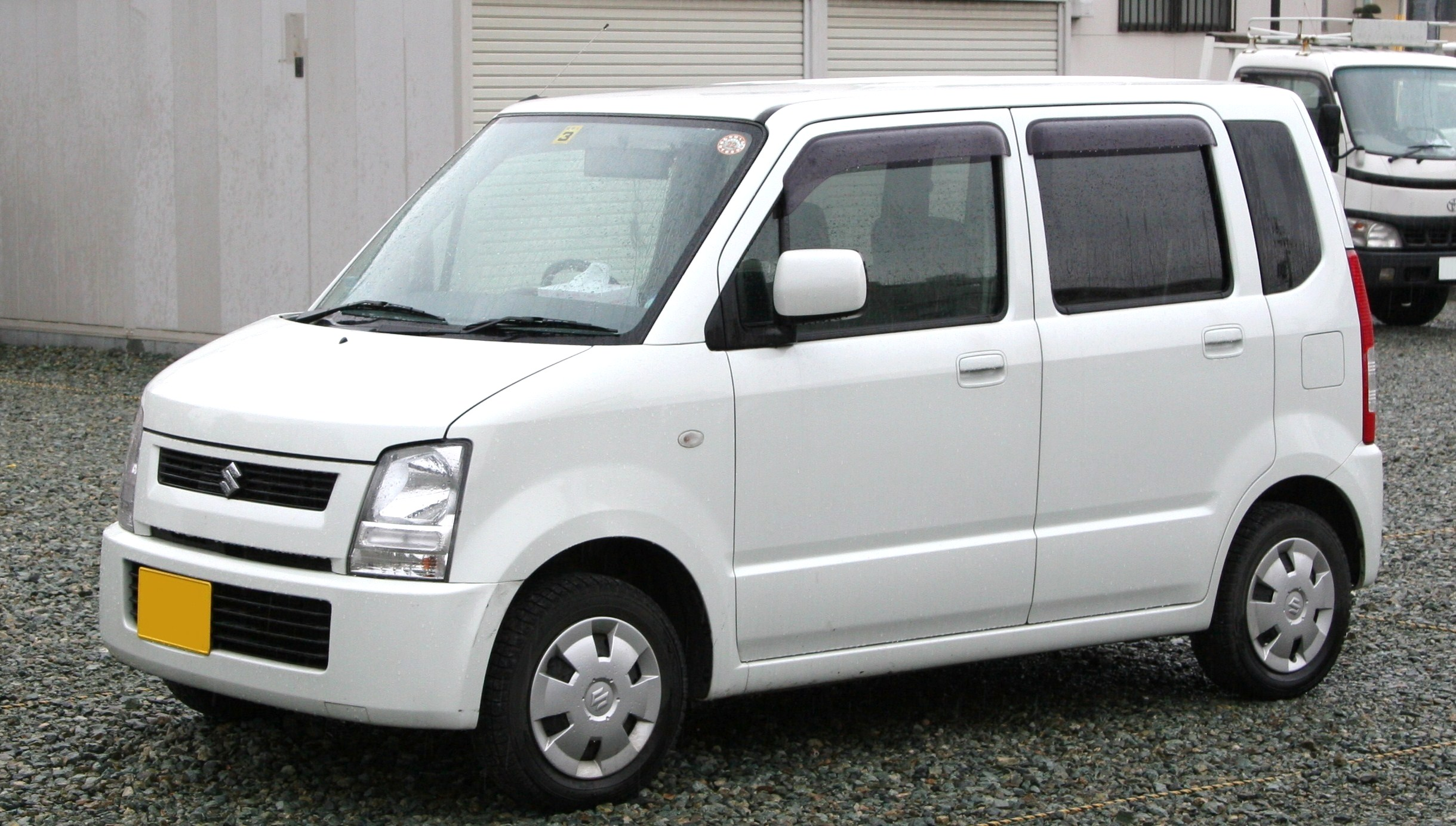
- Suzuki Wagon R (pre-facelift)

Overview
- Model code: MH21S/MH22S
- Also called: Mazda AZ Wagon
- Production: September 2003 – September 2008

Body and chassis
- Body style: 5-door hatchback

Powertrain
- Engine: 658 cc K6A DOHC I3; 658 cc K6A DOHC turbo I3
- Transmission: CVT; 4-speed automatic 5-speed manual

Dimensions
- Wheelbase: 2,360 mm (92.9 in)
- Length: 3,395 mm (133.7 in)
- Width: 1,475 mm (58.1 in)
- Height: 1,635–1,655 mm (64.4–65.2 in)
- Curb weight: 810–940 kg (1,786–2,072 lb)

The third generation Wagon R was launched in Japan in September 2003 for the Wagon R's tenth Anniversary. The Wagon R only powered by a 660 cc K6A engines from most Suzuki's kei car range and the more wider version was not developed and replaced to the Solio. The third generation was then facelifted in September 2005 and replaced three years later. The somewhat sportier looking Wagon R/RR continued to be on offer, being released at the same time. Two engines were available to the RR, both turbocharged and intercooled K6A engines with 64 PS (47 kW) at 6,500 rpm, but one has direct injection for cleaner emissions and better fuel economy. The RR was also facelifted in September 2005, with a new grille and bumpers (front and rear). At this time, the conventional (not direct injection) engine was discontinued; in September 2006 it was replaced by the less powerful "M Turbo" engine with 60 PS (44 kW) at 6,000 rpm.

The sportier Wagon R Stingray (Japanese: ワゴンR スティングレー, Wagon'āru Sutingurēi), was launched in February 2007, is a sportier version of the third generation Suzuki Wagon R. The name is an homage to the "Sting Ray" Fronte which was introduced in 1970. In addition to a more aggressive front end treatment, the Stingray also received clear taillights. Alloy wheels and an aero kit were also standard. The 660 cc engine was powered by a turbocharger, further enhancing the speed and acceleration. On average, the Stingray went from 0 to 100 km/h (62 mph) in about 15 seconds.

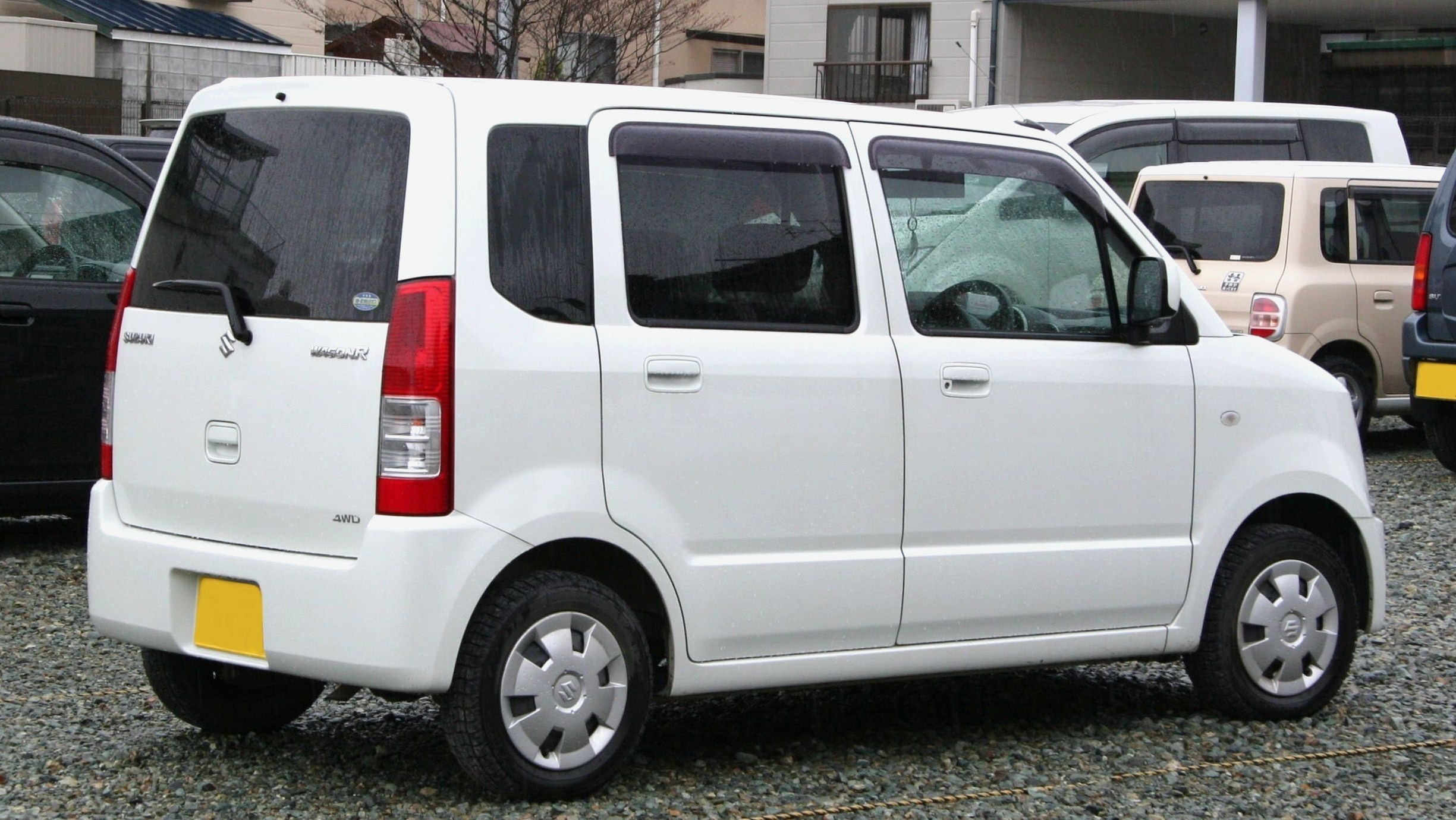
Suzuki Wagon R (pre-facelift)

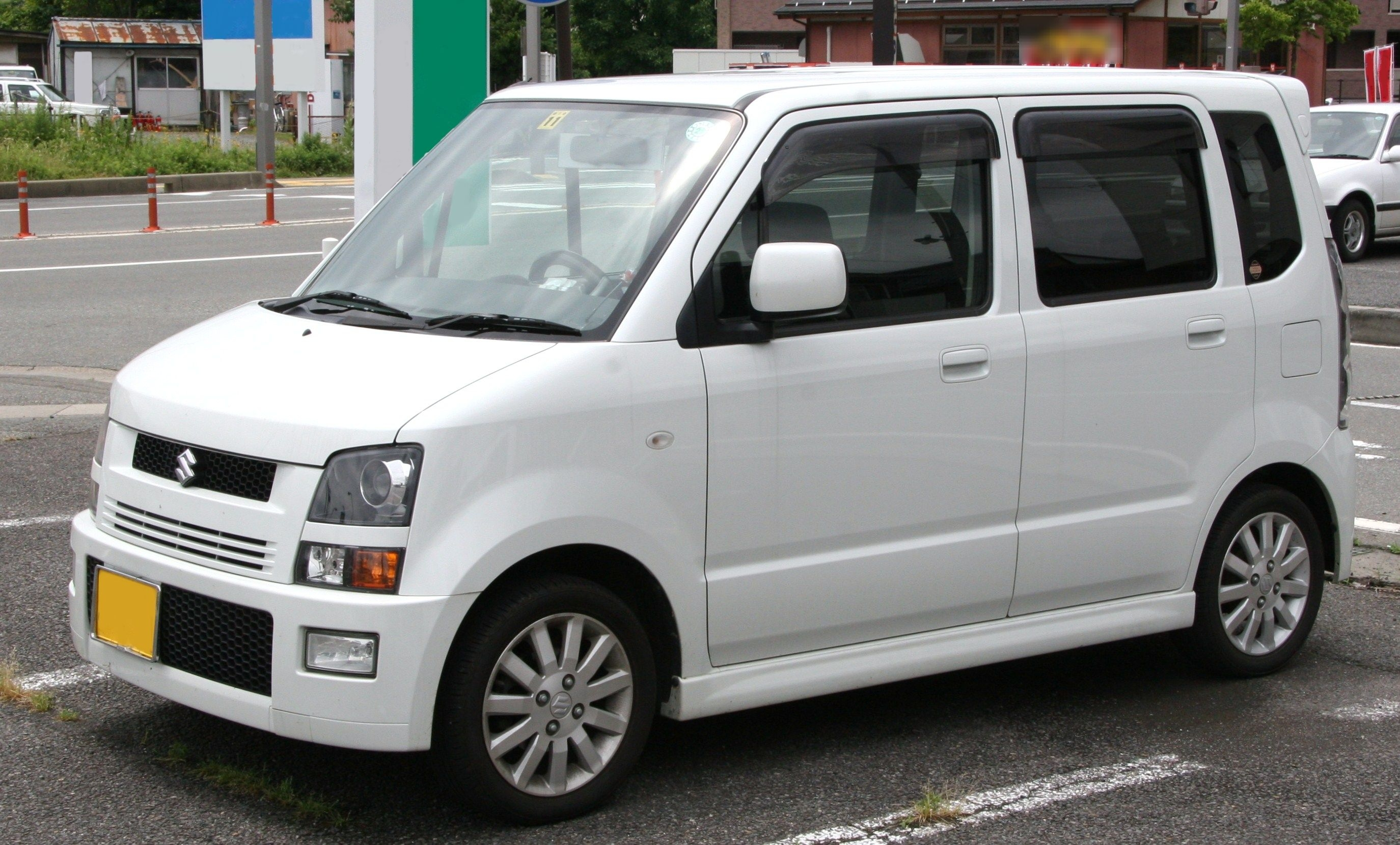
Suzuki Wagon R RR (pre-facelift)

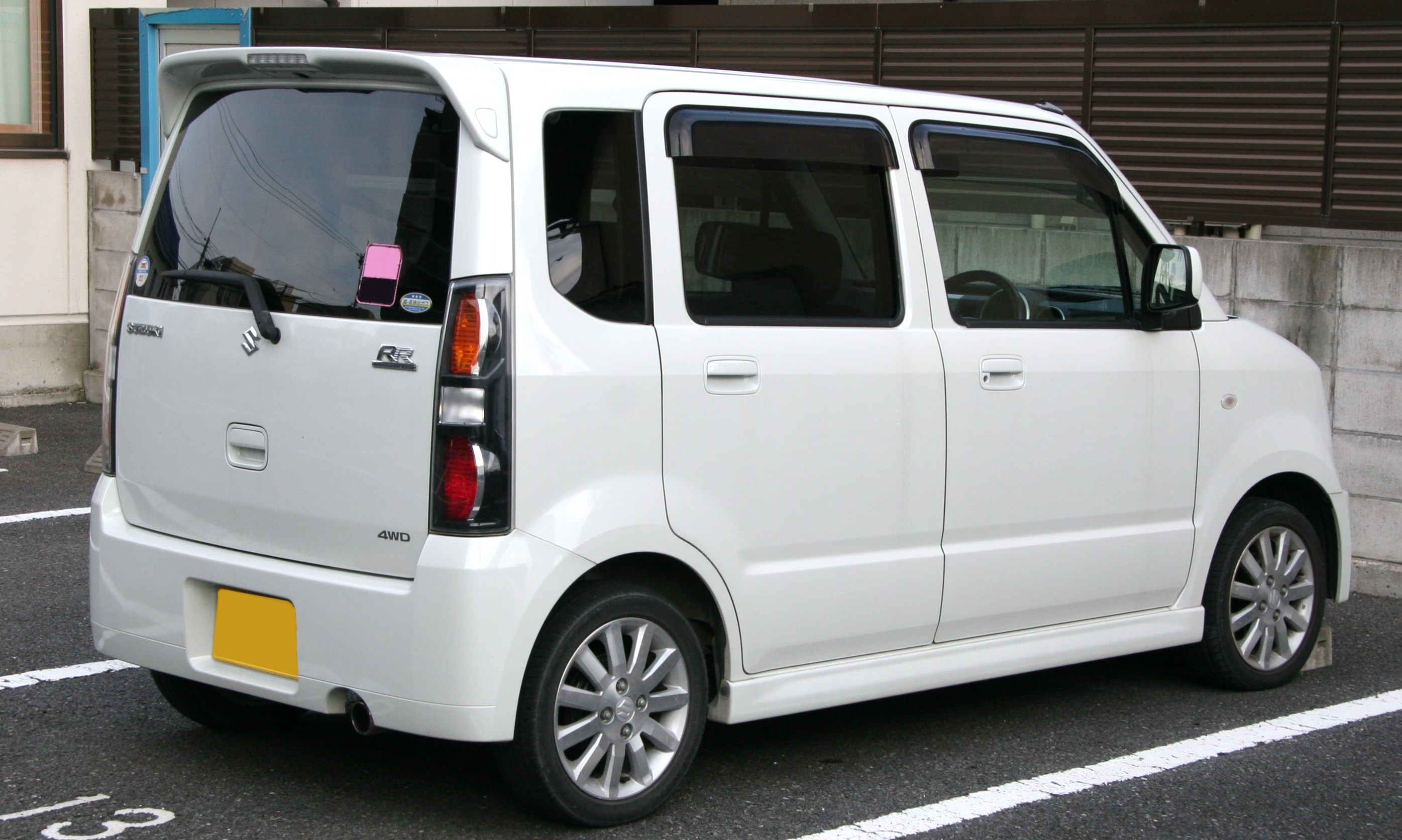
Suzuki Wagon R RR (pre-facelift)

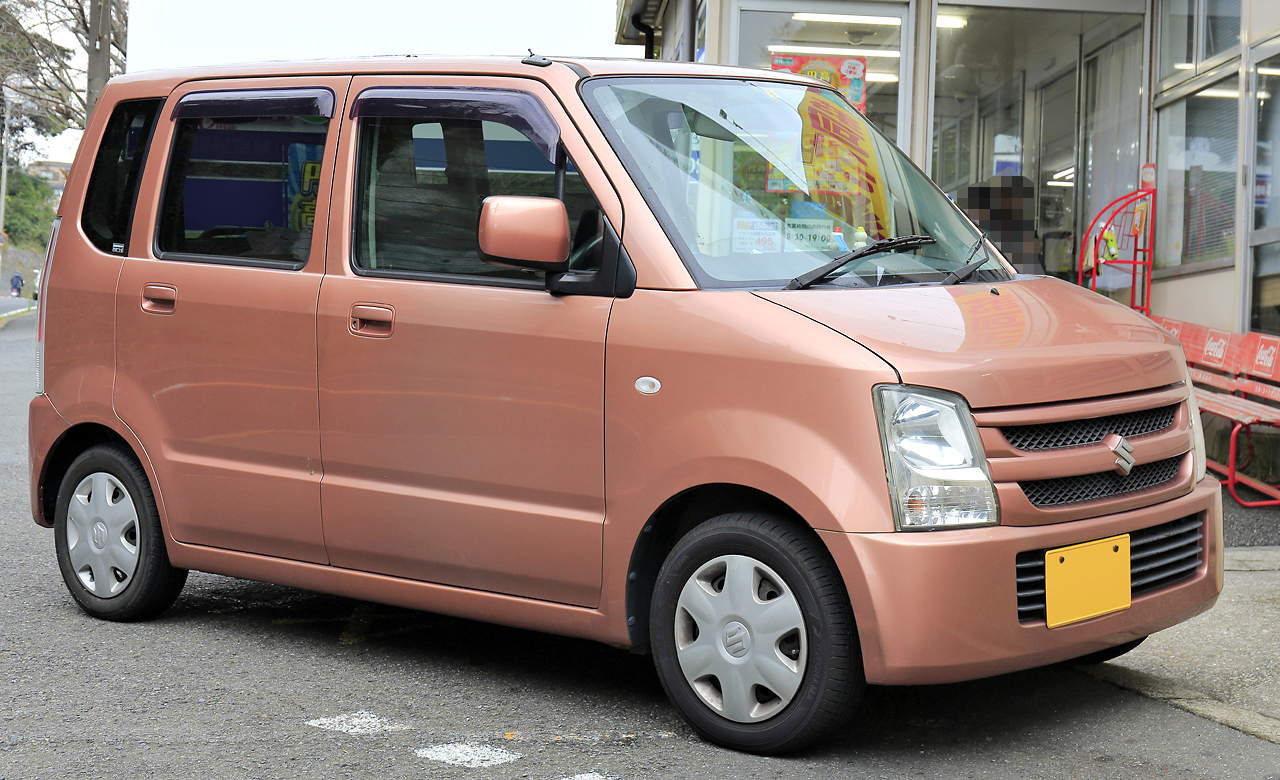
Suzuki Wagon R (facelift)

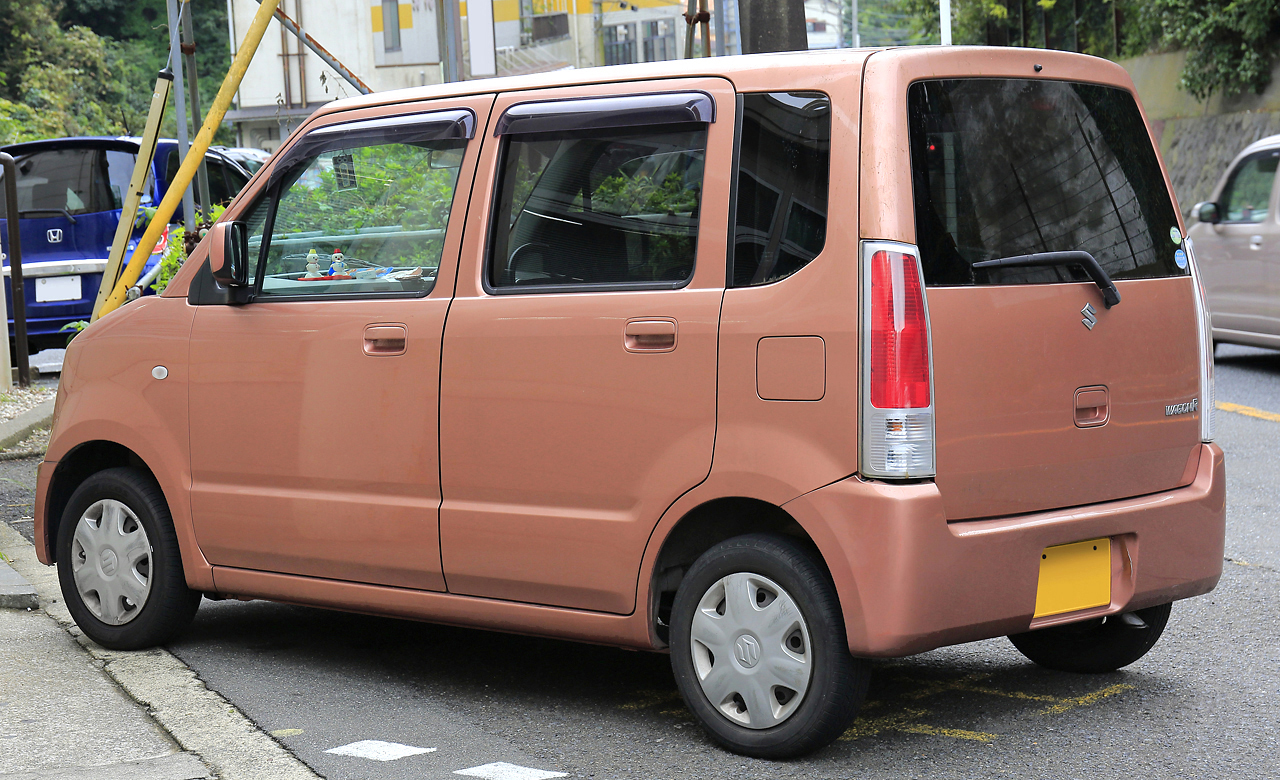
Suzuki Wagon R (facelift)

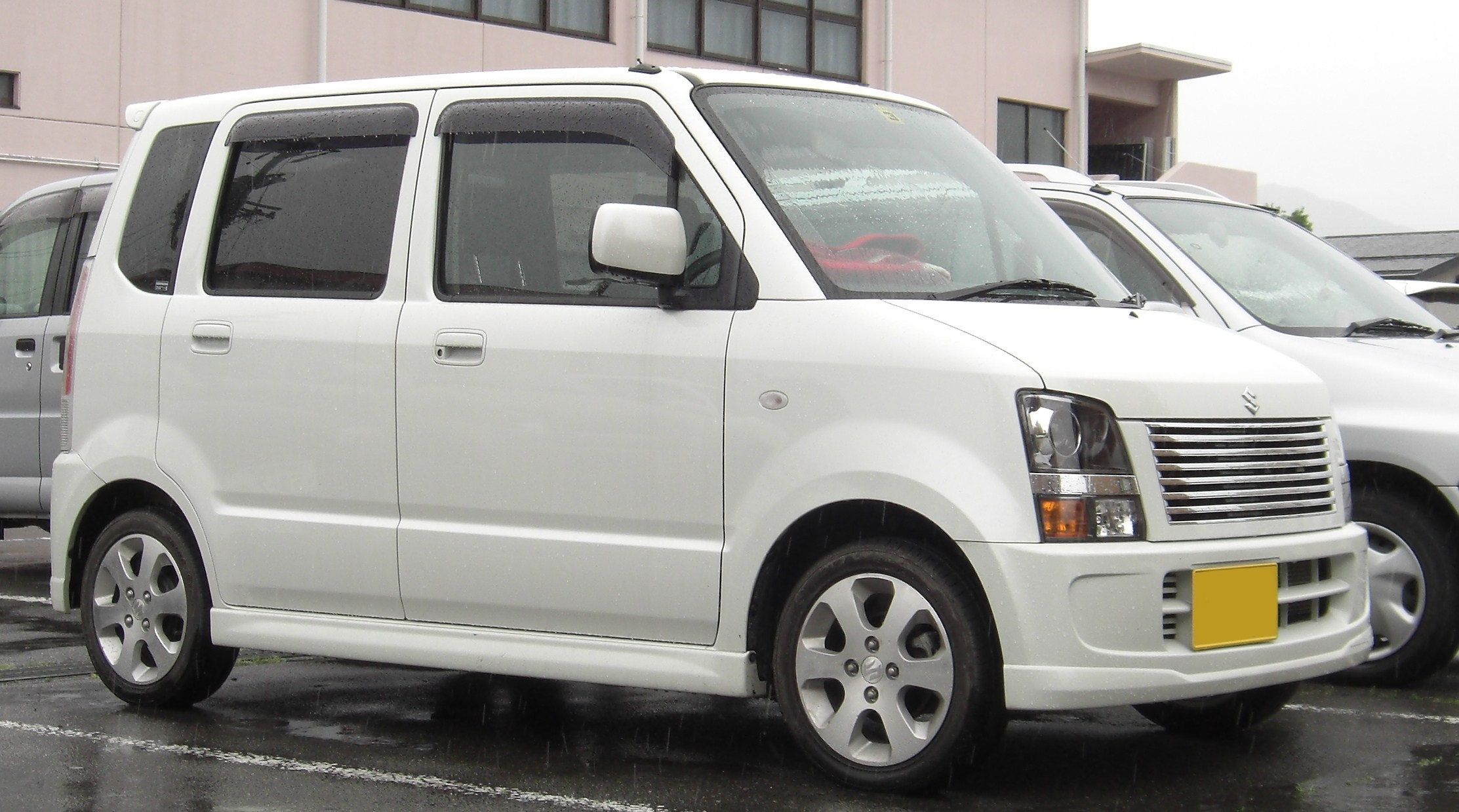
Suzuki Wagon R FT-S Limited (facelift)

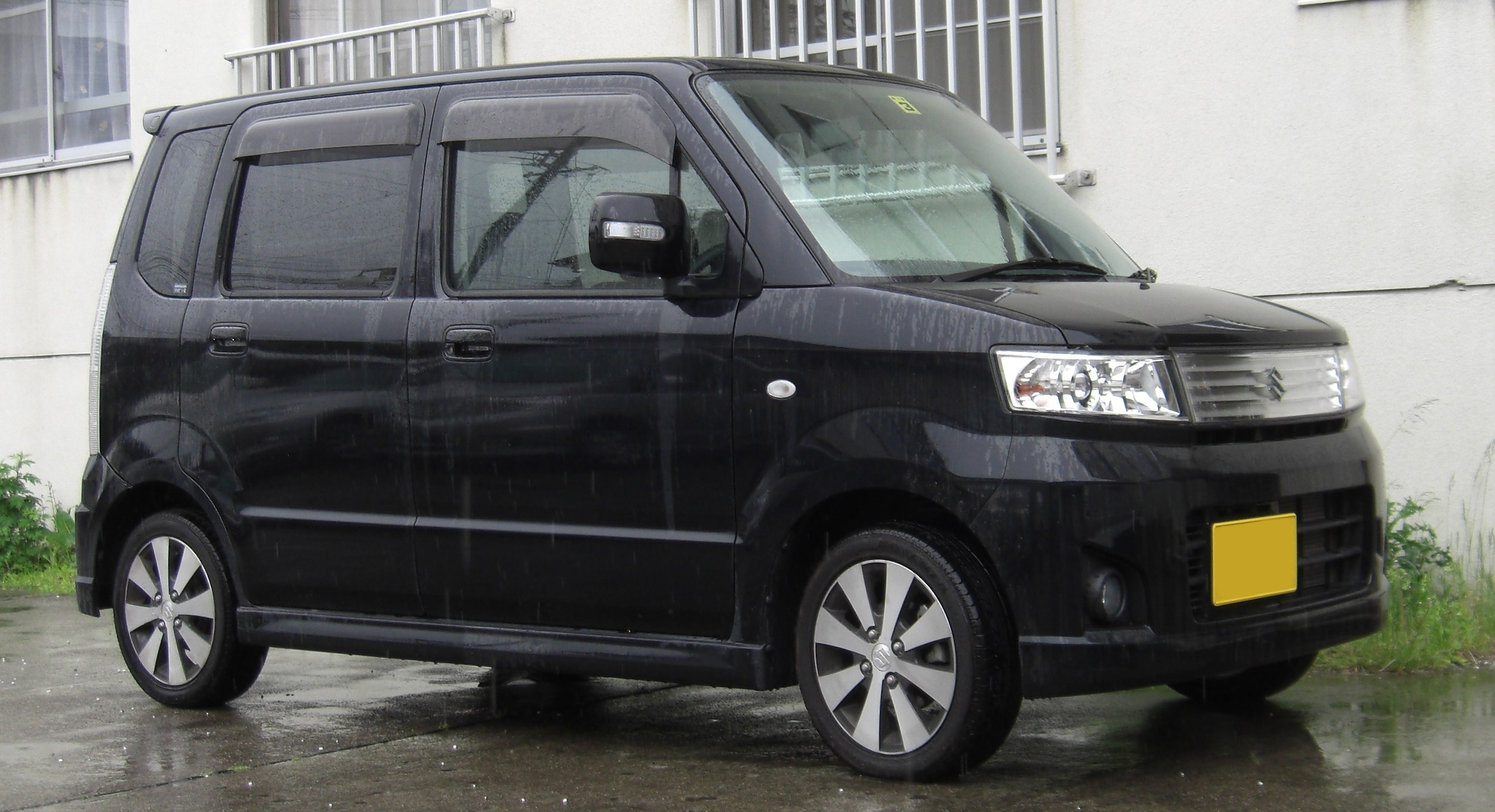
Suzuki Wagon R Stingray

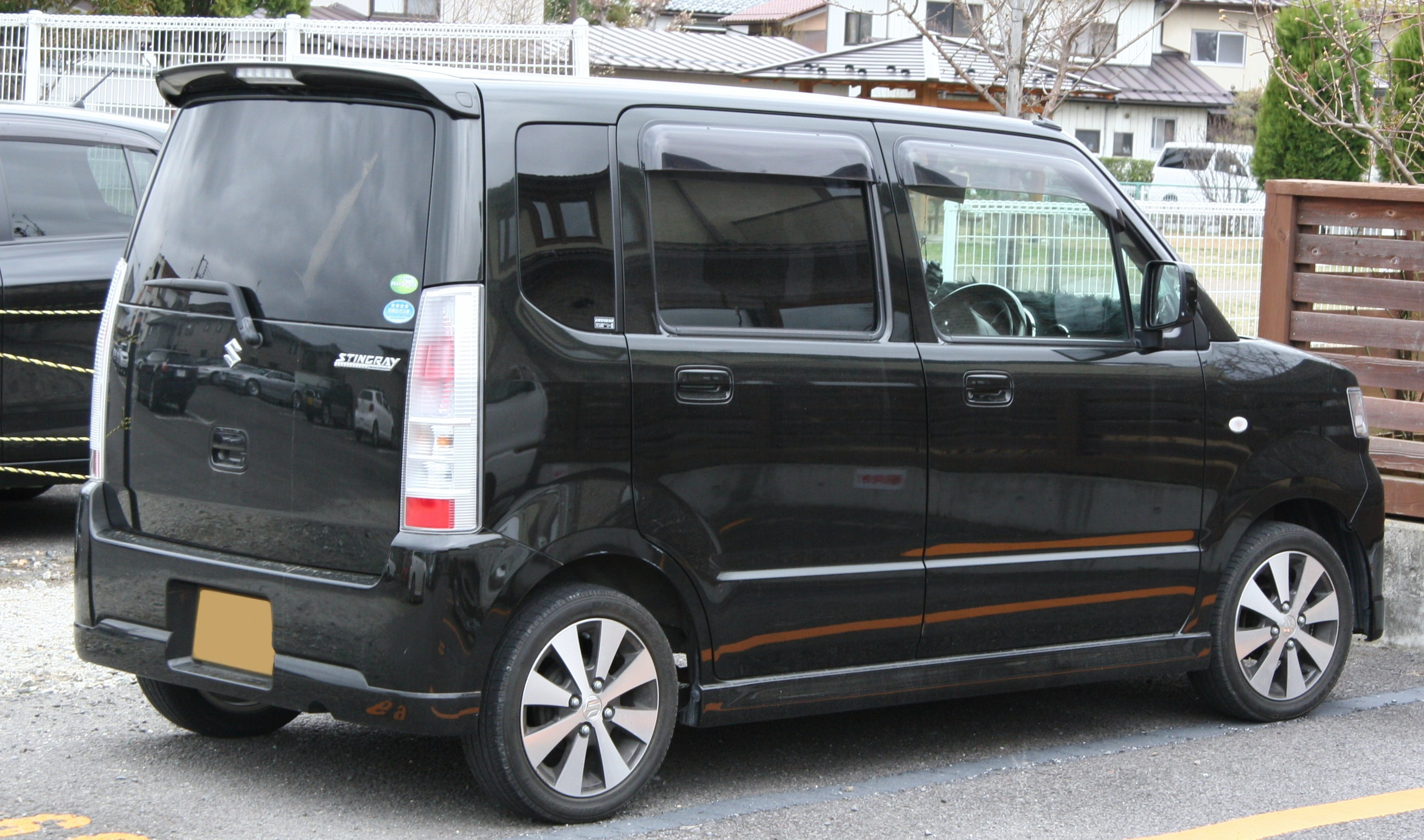
Suzuki Wagon R Stingray

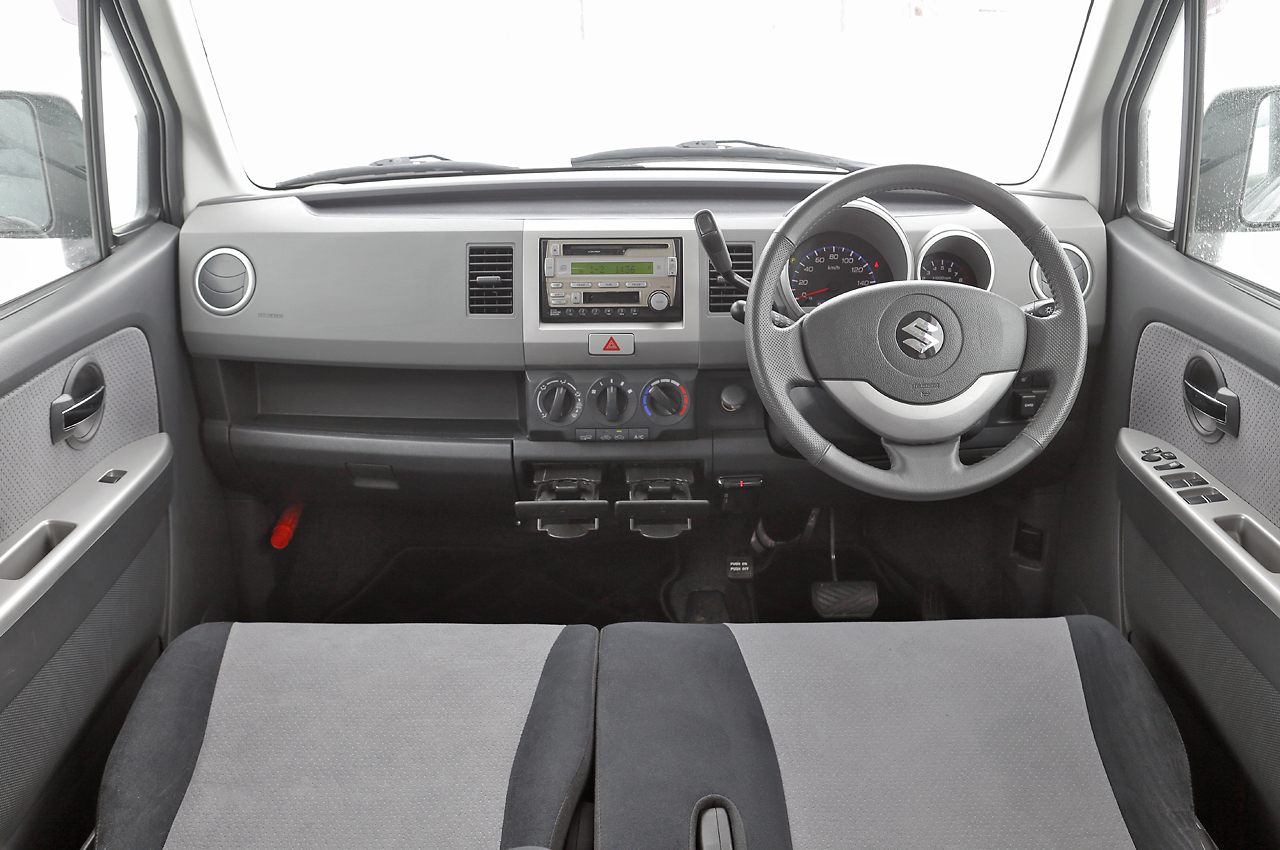
Interior

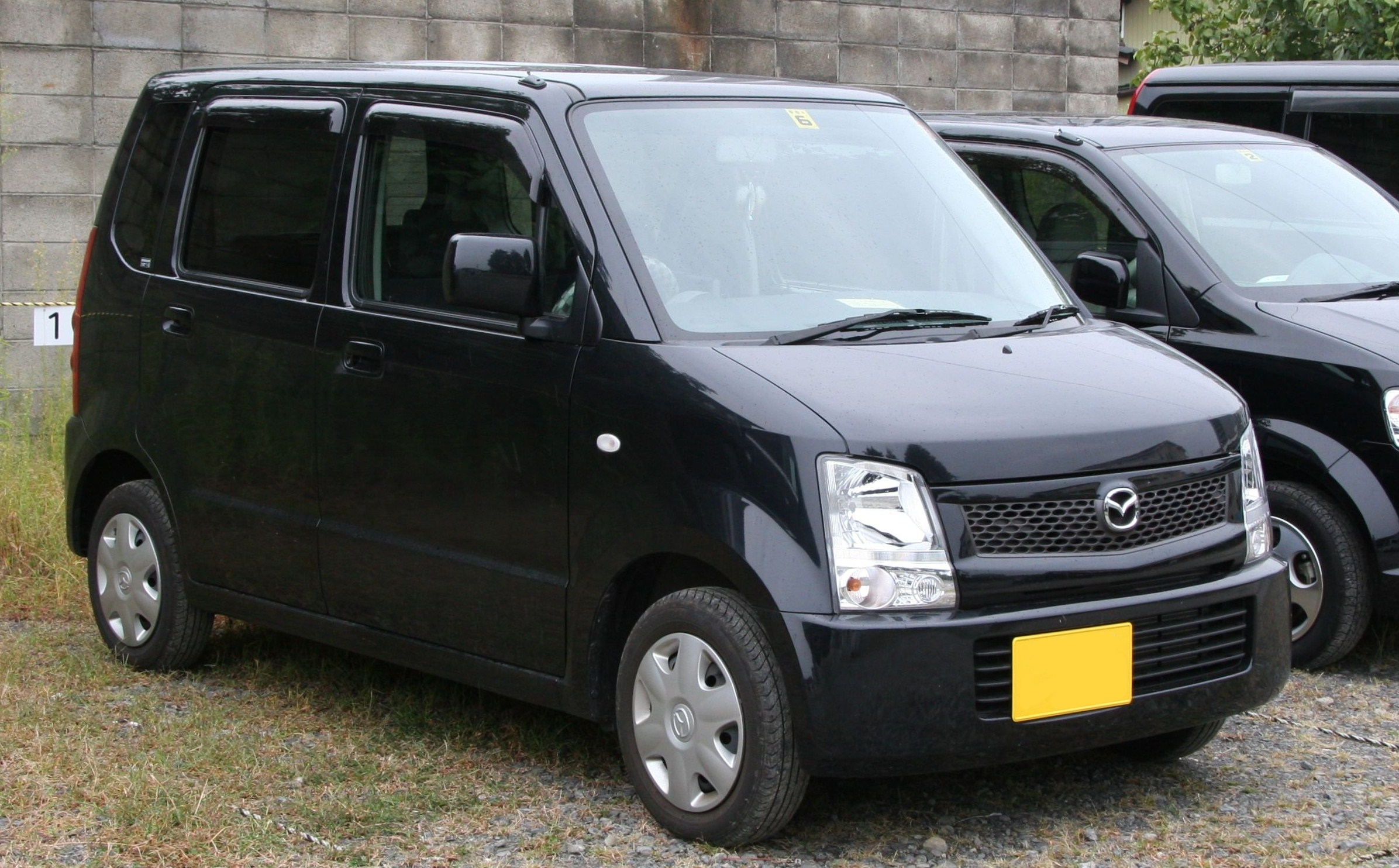
Mazda AZ-Wagon

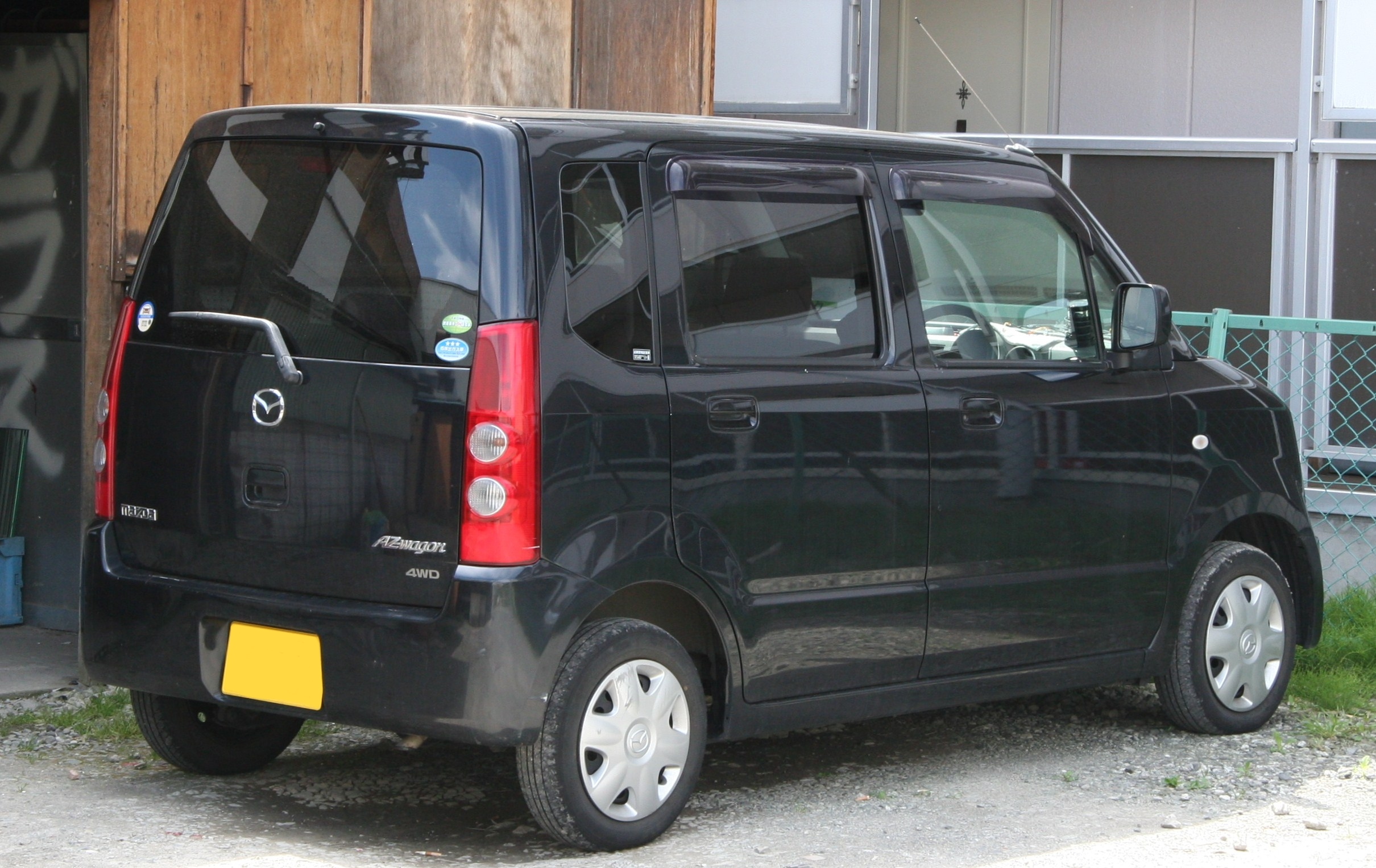
Mazda AZ-Wagon

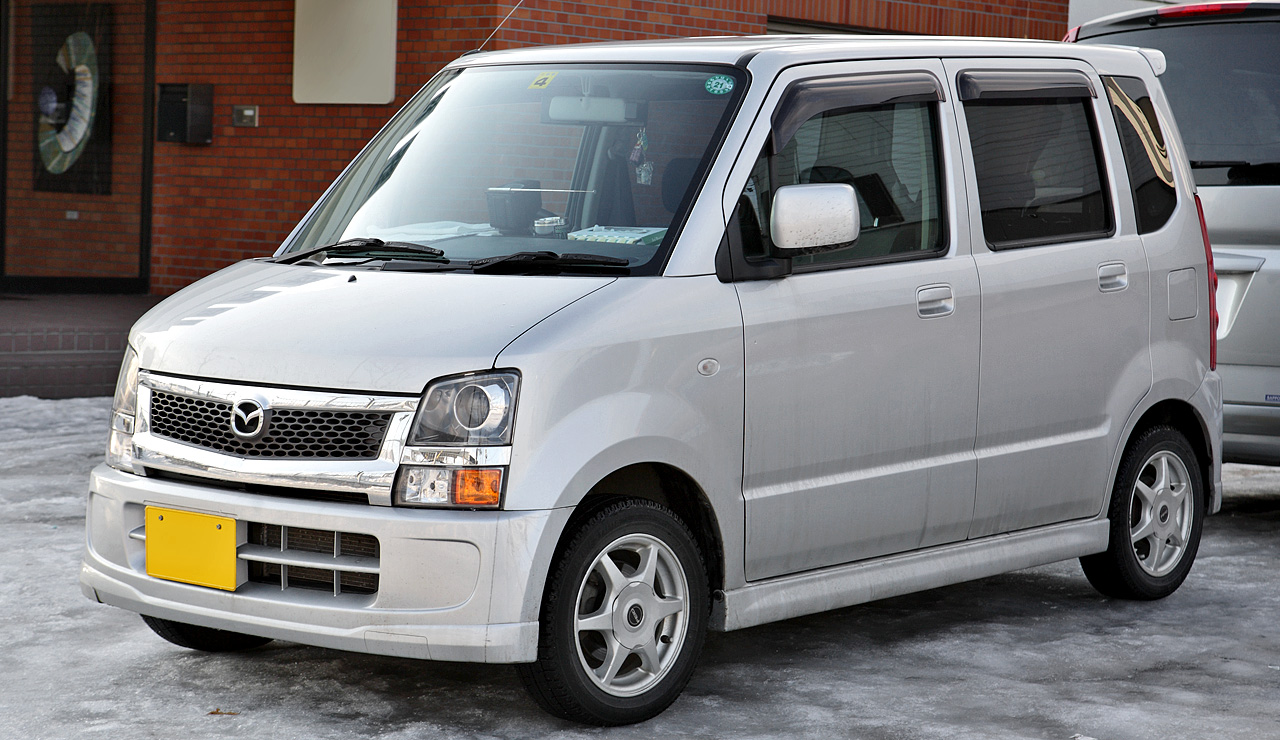
Mazda AZ-Wagon Special

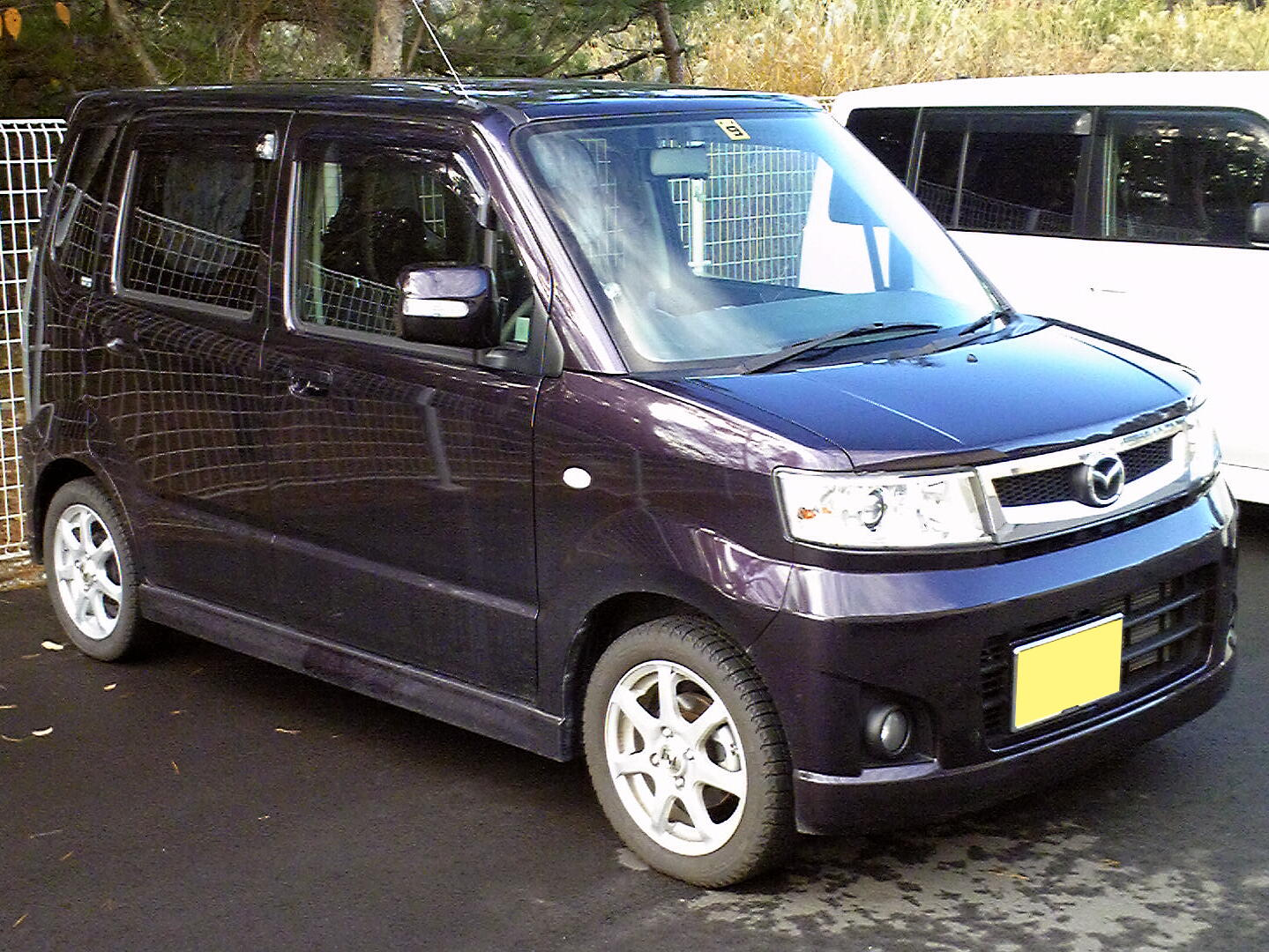
Mazda AZ-wagonn Cutomstyle

== Fourth generation (MH23S; 2008) ==
Fourth generation
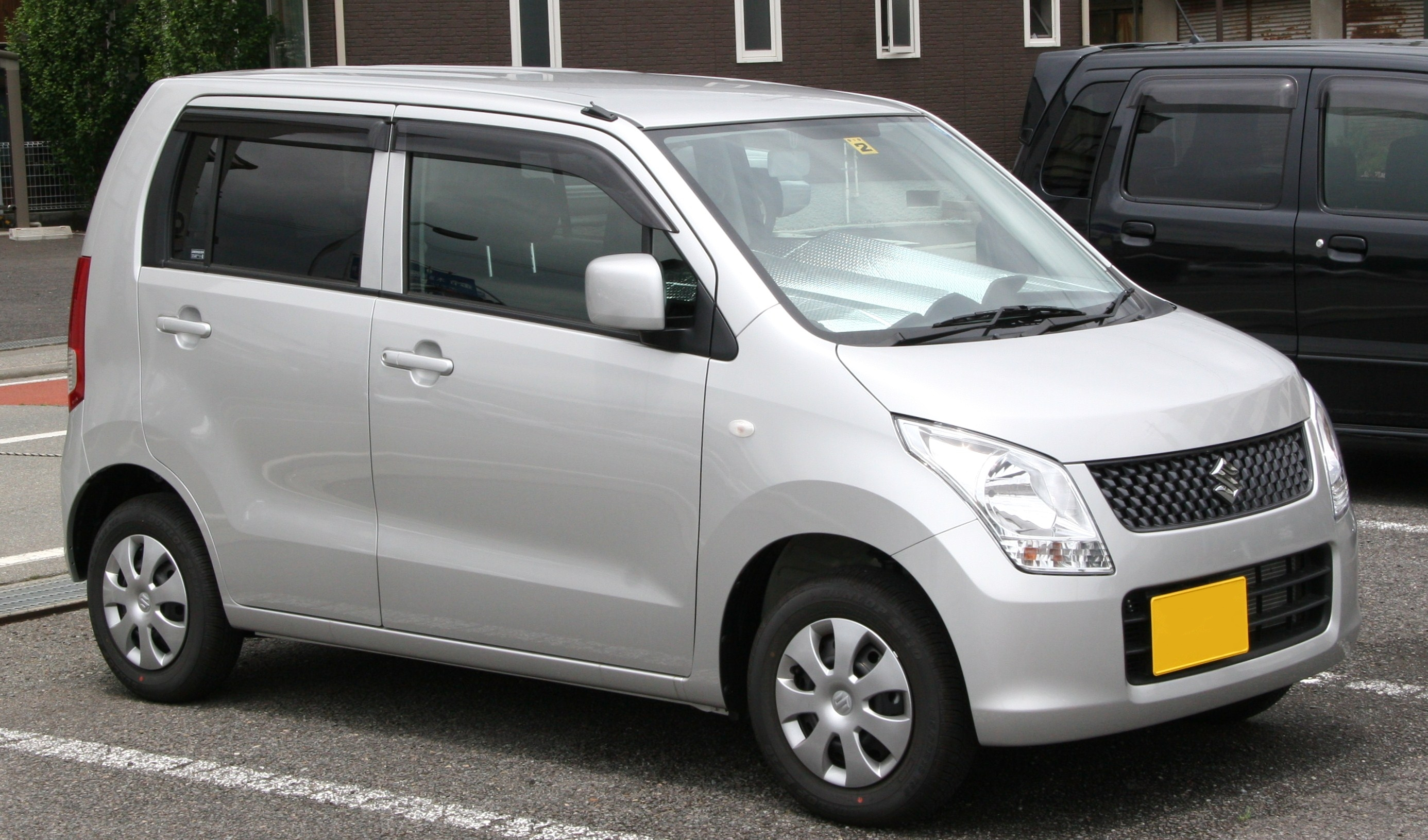
- Fourth generation Suzuki Wagon R

Overview
- Model code: MH23S
- Also called: Mazda AZ Wagon
- Production: September 2008 – September 2012

Body and chassis
- Body style: 5-door hatchback
- Related: Maruti Suzuki Wagon R (second generation)

Powertrain
- Engine: 658 cc K6A DOHC I3; 658 cc K6A DOHC turbo I3
- Transmission: CVT; 4-speed automatic 5-speed manual

Dimensions
- Wheelbase: 2,400 mm (94.5 in)
- Length: 3,395 mm (133.7 in)
- Width: 1,475 mm (58.1 in)
- Height: 1,660–1,675 mm (65.4–65.9 in)
- Curb weight: 800–930 kg (1,764–2,050 lb)

The fourth generation Wagon R was launched in Japan in September 2008 along with the sportier Stingray model. Corresponding models with Mazda badging were sold as the AZ Wagon and AZ Wagon Custom. Significant differences for the new generation include larger rear doors, which incorporate quarter glass, eliminating the need for a D-pillar arrangement. Powertrain options include naturally aspirated and turbocharged 660 cc K6A engines with the latter developing an output of 64 PS (47 kW), mated to a 4-speed automatic, a 5-speed manual transmission, or a CVT. As with many other Japanese market models, customers can choose between front-wheel and all-wheel-drive versions.

In May 2012, only three months before the changeover to the fifth generation, the Wagon R received minor changes to meet new safety requirements. This meant larger front headrests, saddle-type rear headrests, and Isofix anchors being installed in the rear seats.

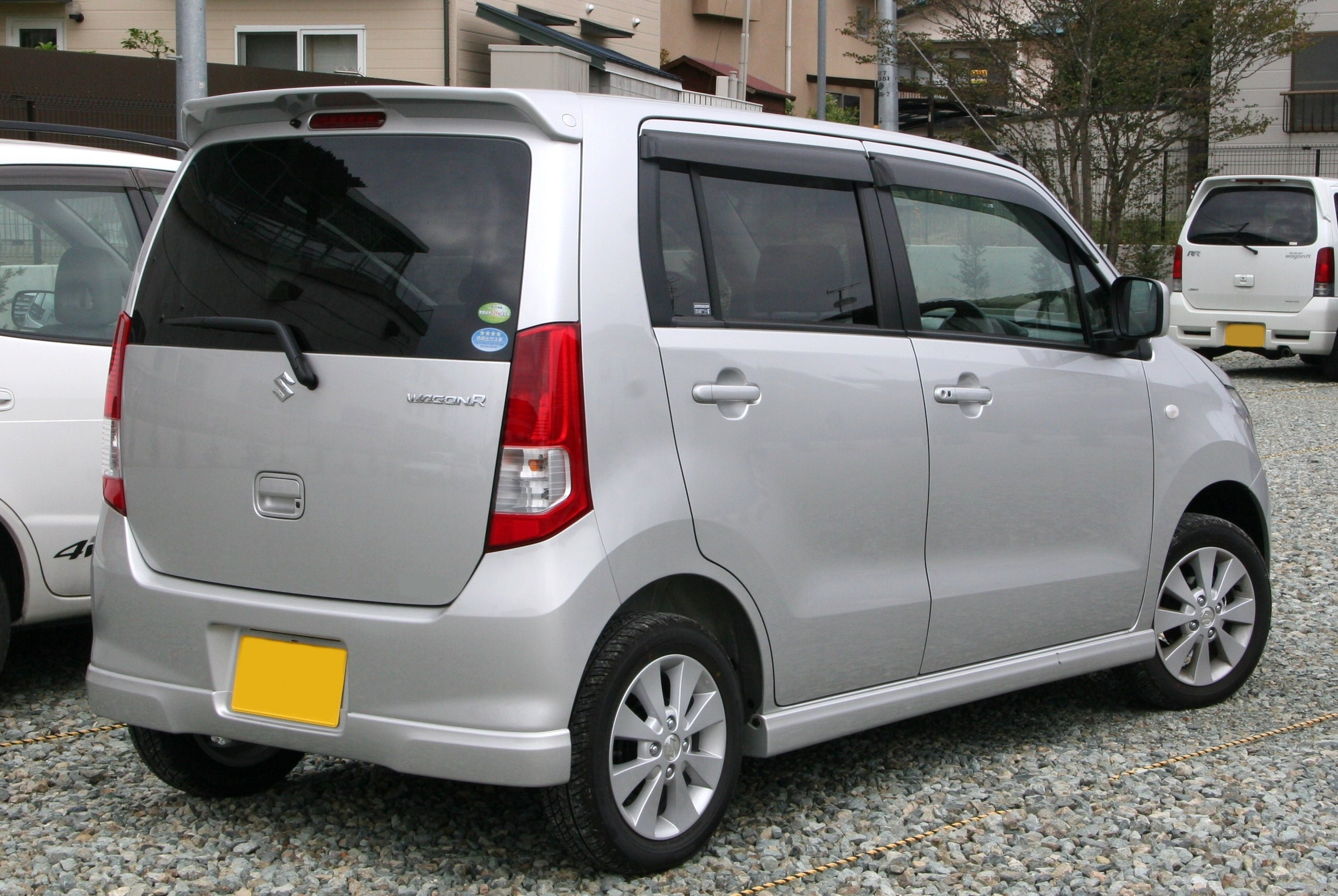
Suzuki Wagon R FX Limited

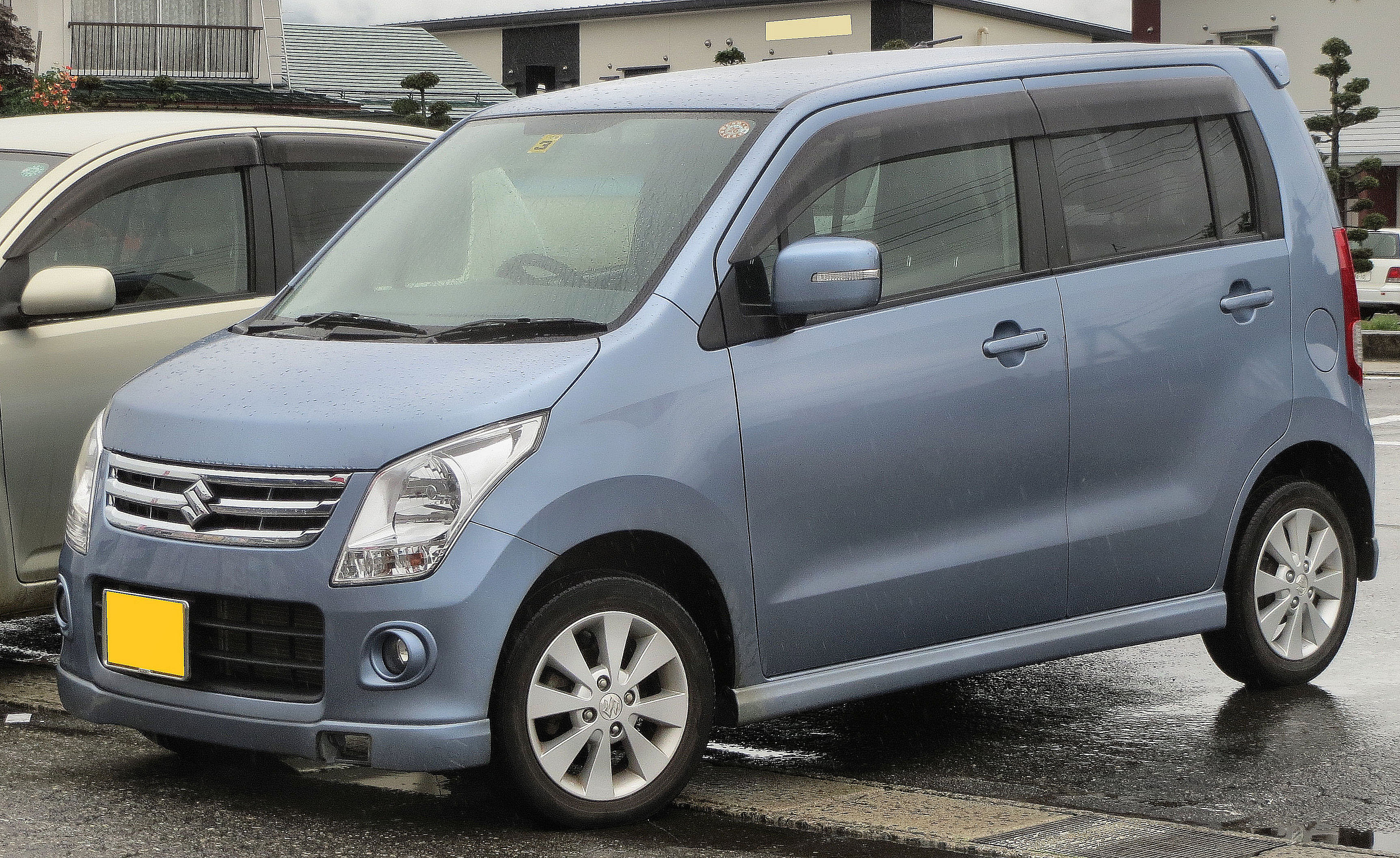
Suzuki Wagon R FX-S Limited

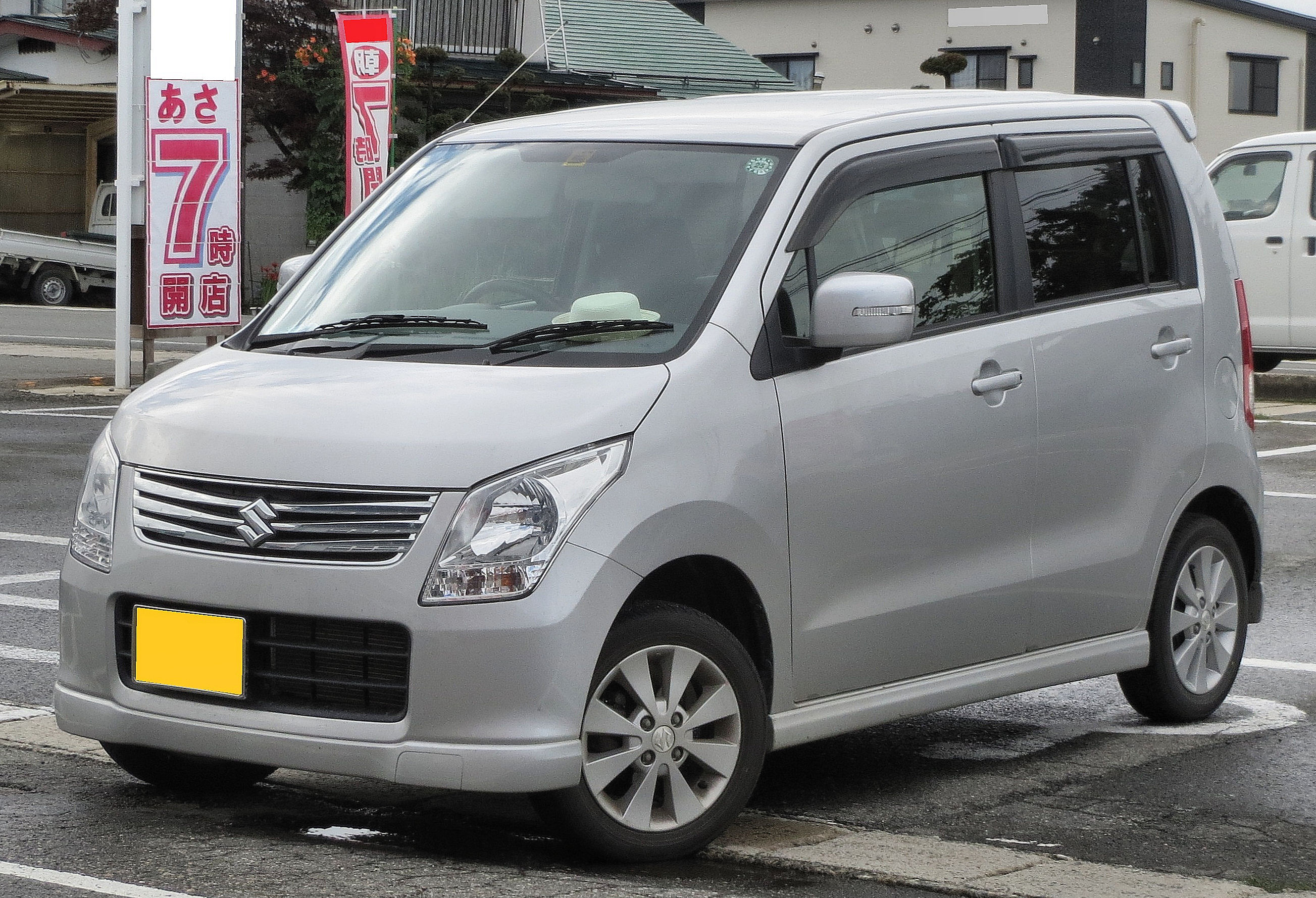
Suzuki Wagon R FX Limited II

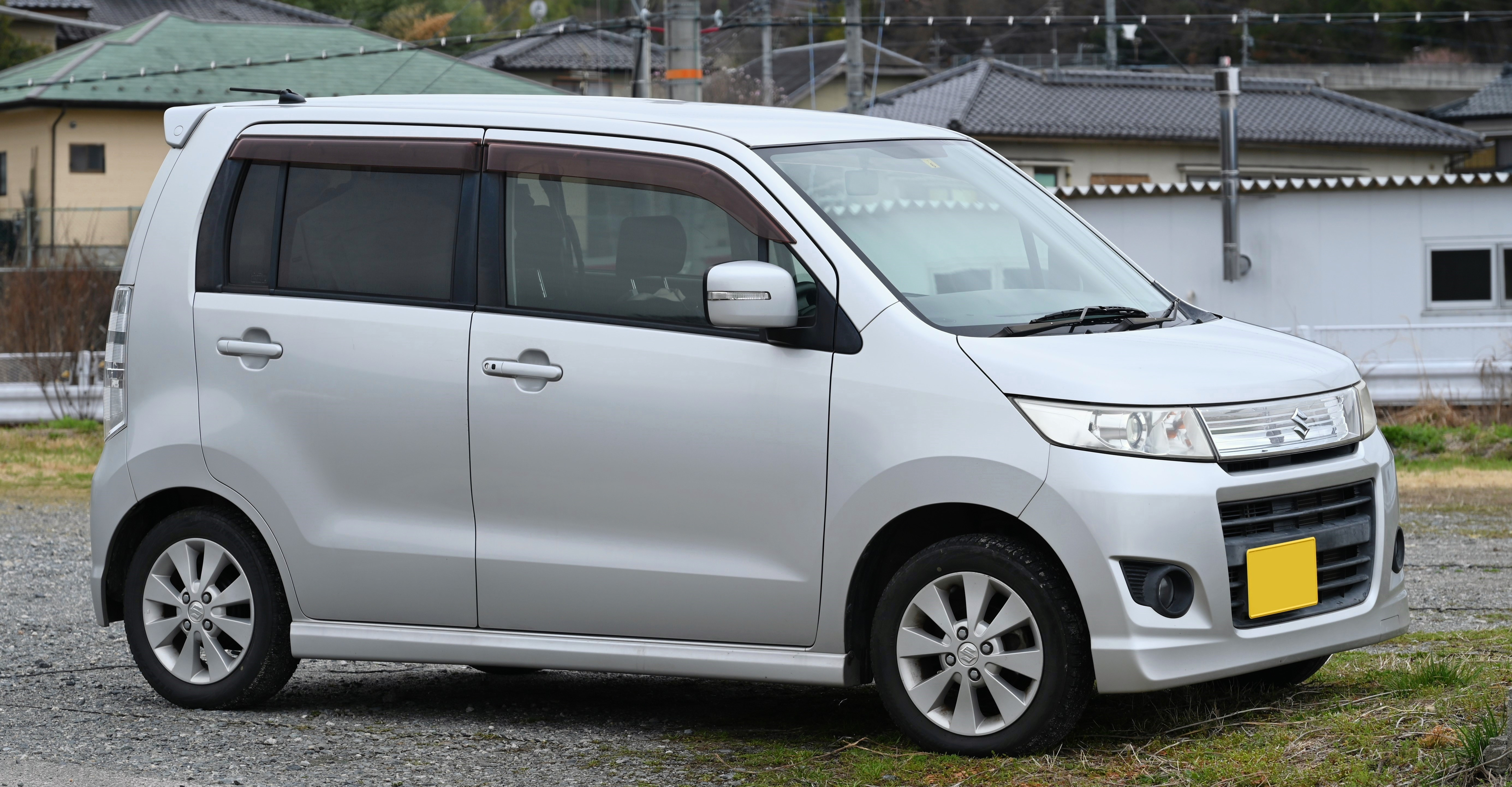
Suzuki Wagon R Stingray

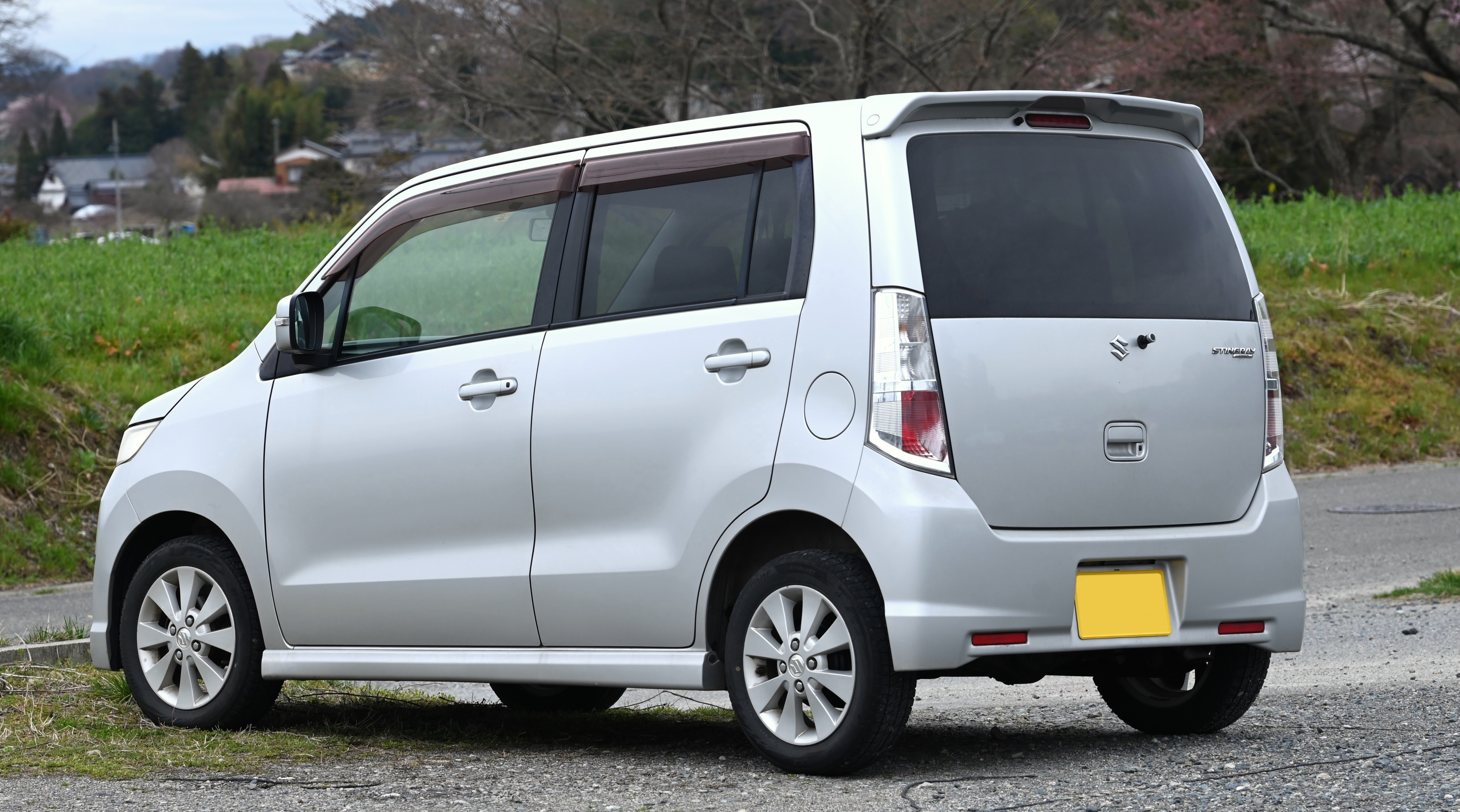
Suzuki Wagon R Stingray

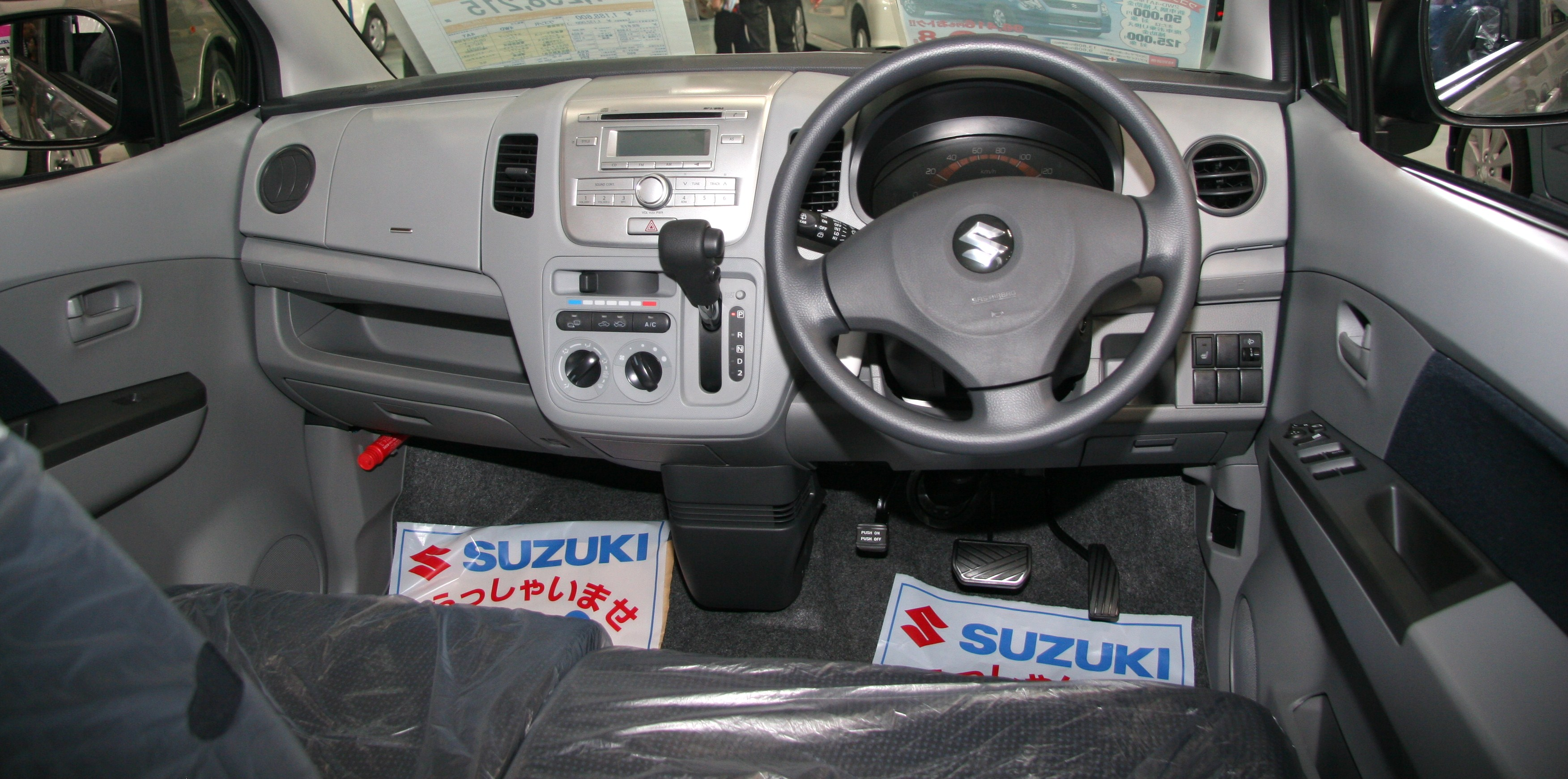
Interior

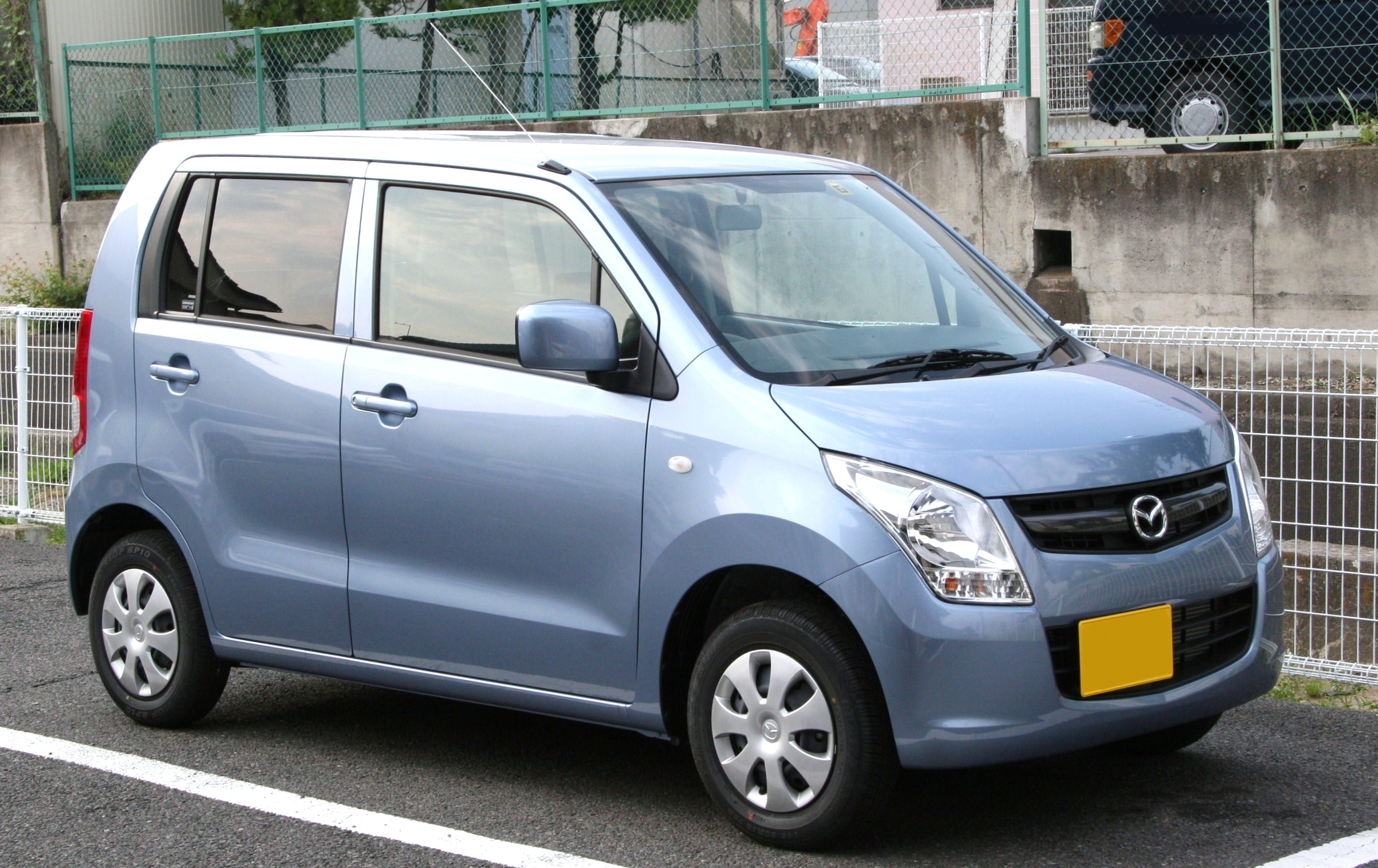
Mazda AZ-Wagon

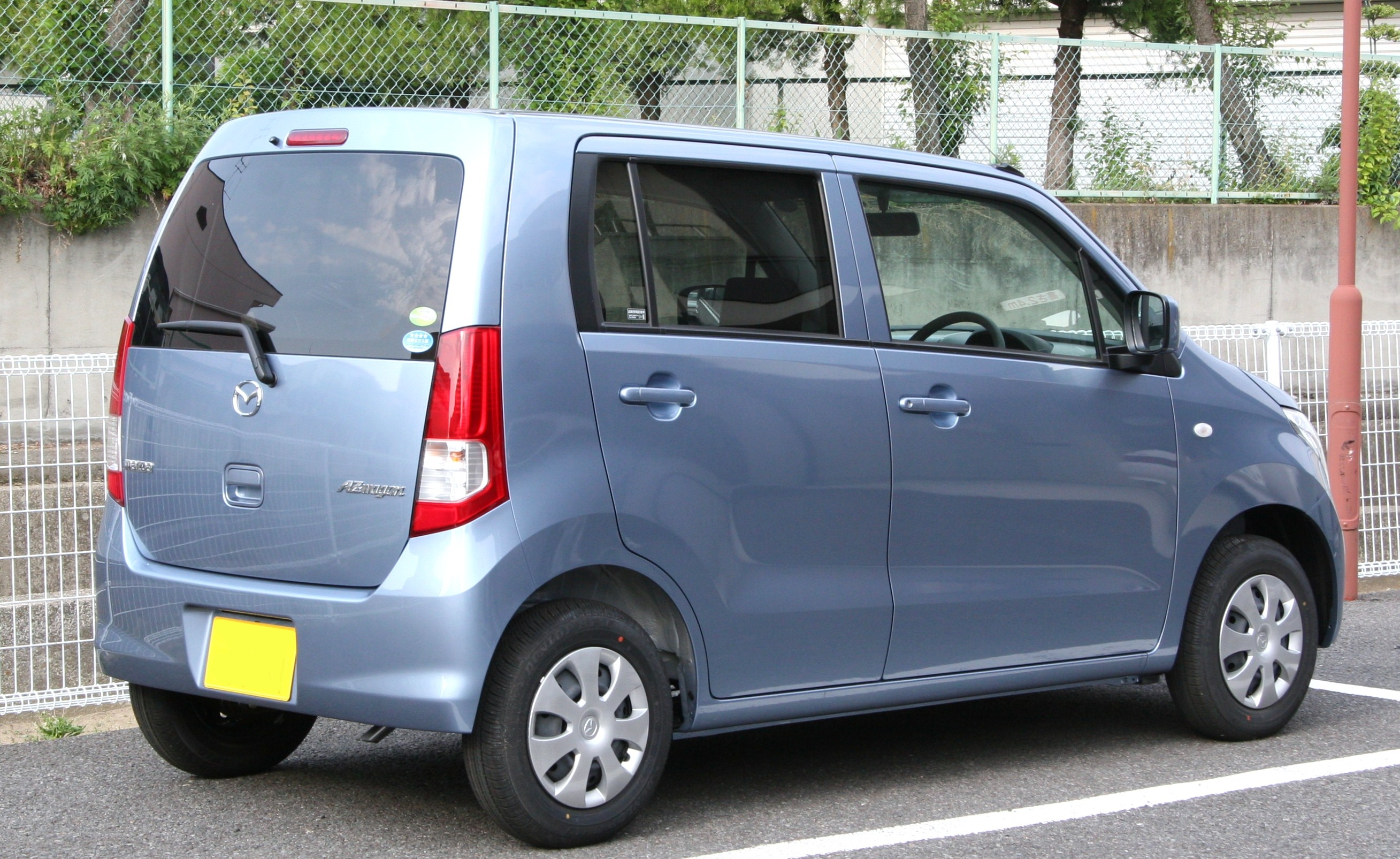
Mazda AZ-Wagon (rear)

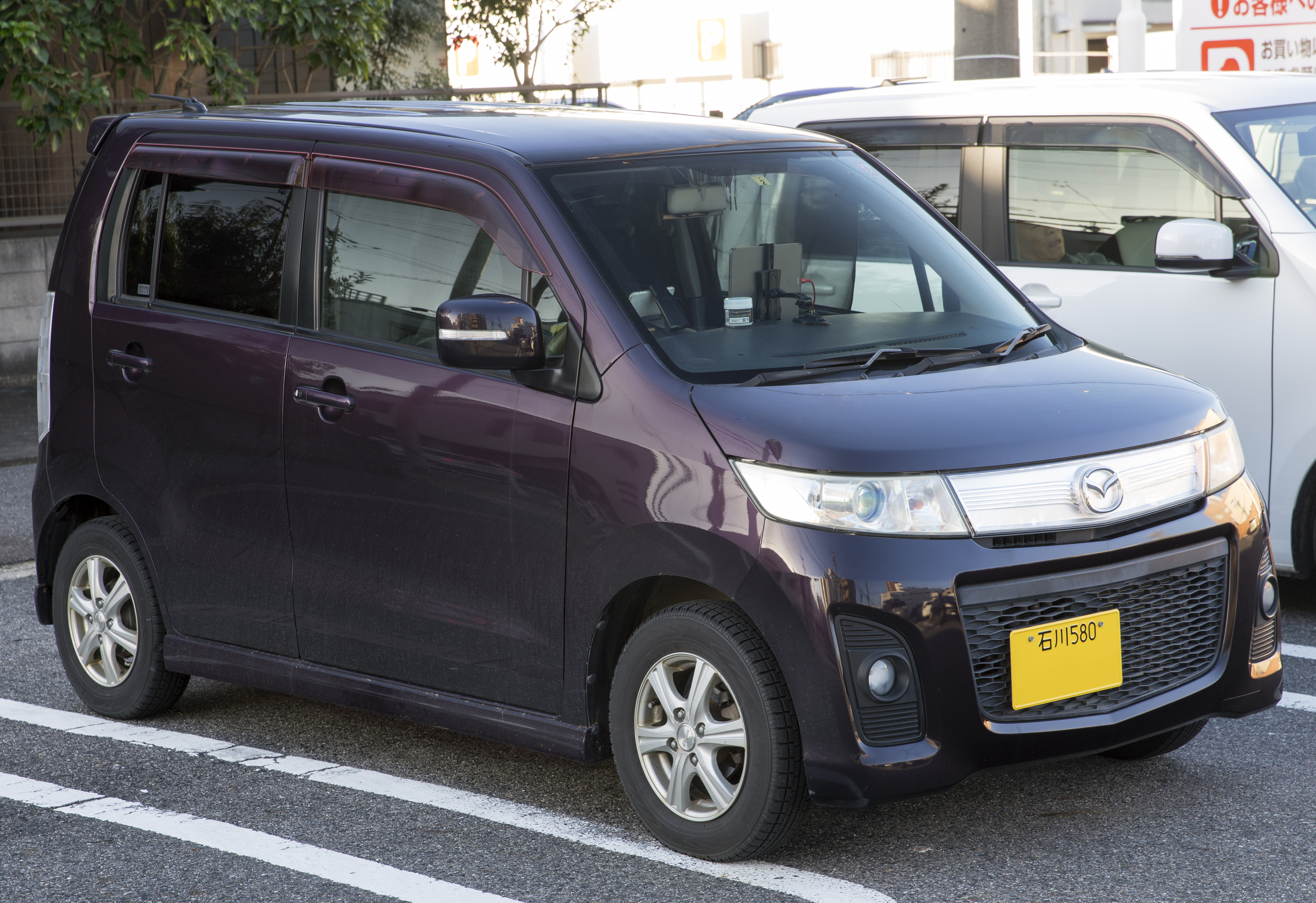
Mazda AZ-Wagon Custom Style XT

== Fifth generation (MH34S/MH44S; 2012) ==
Fifth generation
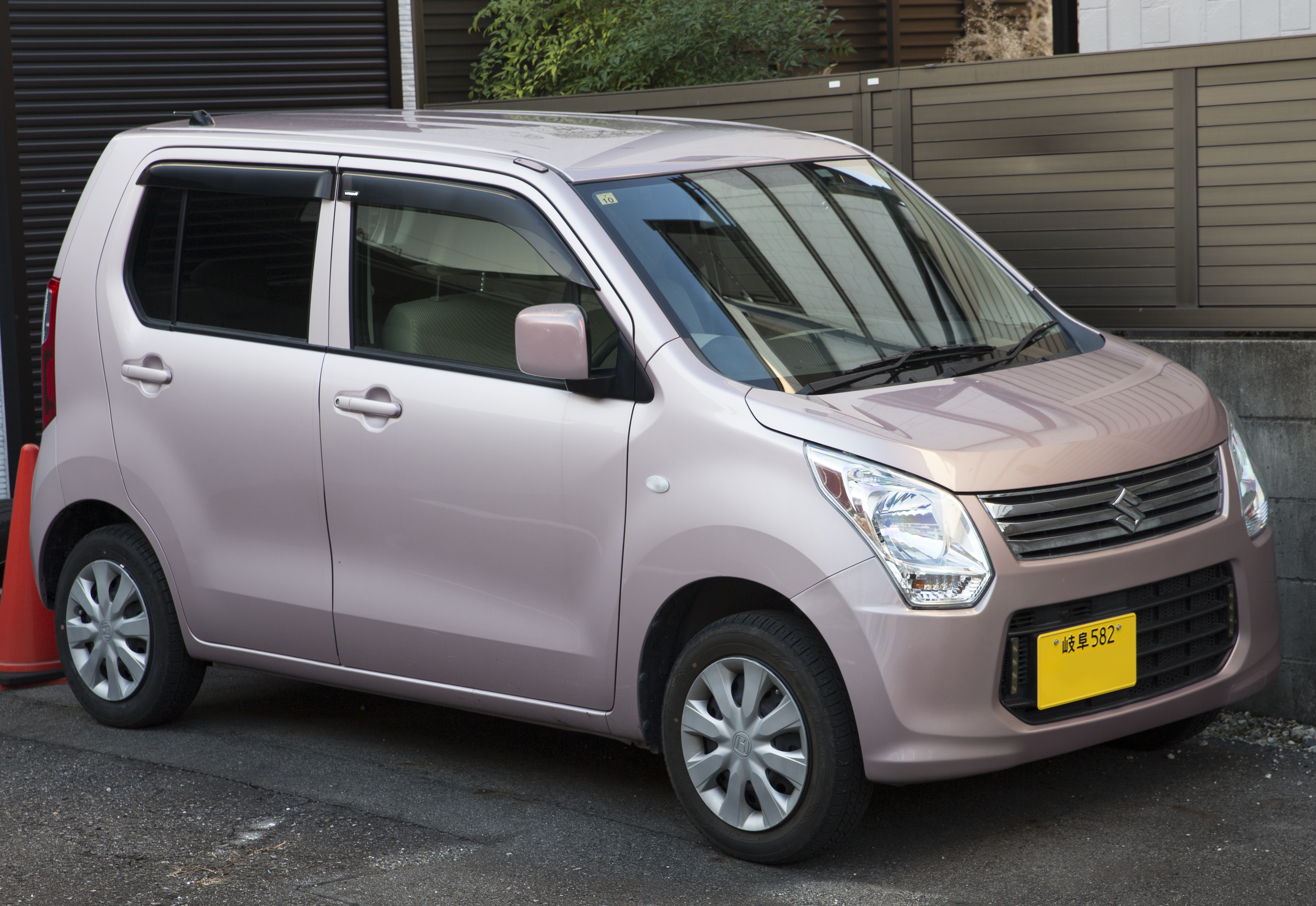
- 2012-2014 Suzuki Wagon R FX (MH34S, pre-facelift)

Overview
- Model code: MH34S/MH44S
- Also called: Mazda Flair
- Production: September 2012 – January 2017

Body and chassis
- Body style: 5-door hatchback

Powertrain
- Engine: 658 cc R06A DOHC I3; 658 cc R06A DOHC turbo I3
- Electric motor: WA04A
- Transmission: CVT; 5-speed manual

Dimensions
- Wheelbase: 2,425 mm (95.5 in)
- Length: 3,395 mm (133.7 in)
- Width: 1,475 mm (58.1 in)
- Height: 1,640–1,660 mm (64.6–65.4 in)
- Curb weight: 780–870 kg (1,720–1,918 lb)

The fifth generation Wagon R range was launched in Japan in September 2012 with an optional mild-hybrid system marketed as "ENE-CHARGE", and an energy-saving electric air conditioning system marketed as "ECO-COOL". With the R06A engine combined with an electric motor/generator and a lithium-ion battery, the ENE-CHARGE provides regenerative braking and power assist to the internal combustion engine and can also run certain electrical equipment, enabling mileage up to 28.8 km/L in Japan's JC08 driving cycle (67.8 mpg US, 3.5 L/100 km EU or 81.4 mpg UK).

The fifth generation Wagon R received a facelift in August 2014, with a larger black plastic grille with a chrome surround at the bottom and sides replacing the earlier, three-bar design. The Stingray was given a small vent opening spanning beneath the chrome/clear grille garnish. Bumpers were also redesigned, while a low-cost FA model was added to the regular Wagon R.

For Mazda variants, the fifth generation Wagon R models are marketed as Mazda Flair and Stingray models are rebadged as Mazda Flair Custom Style. Both the Flair and the Flair Custom Style were launched in October 2012.

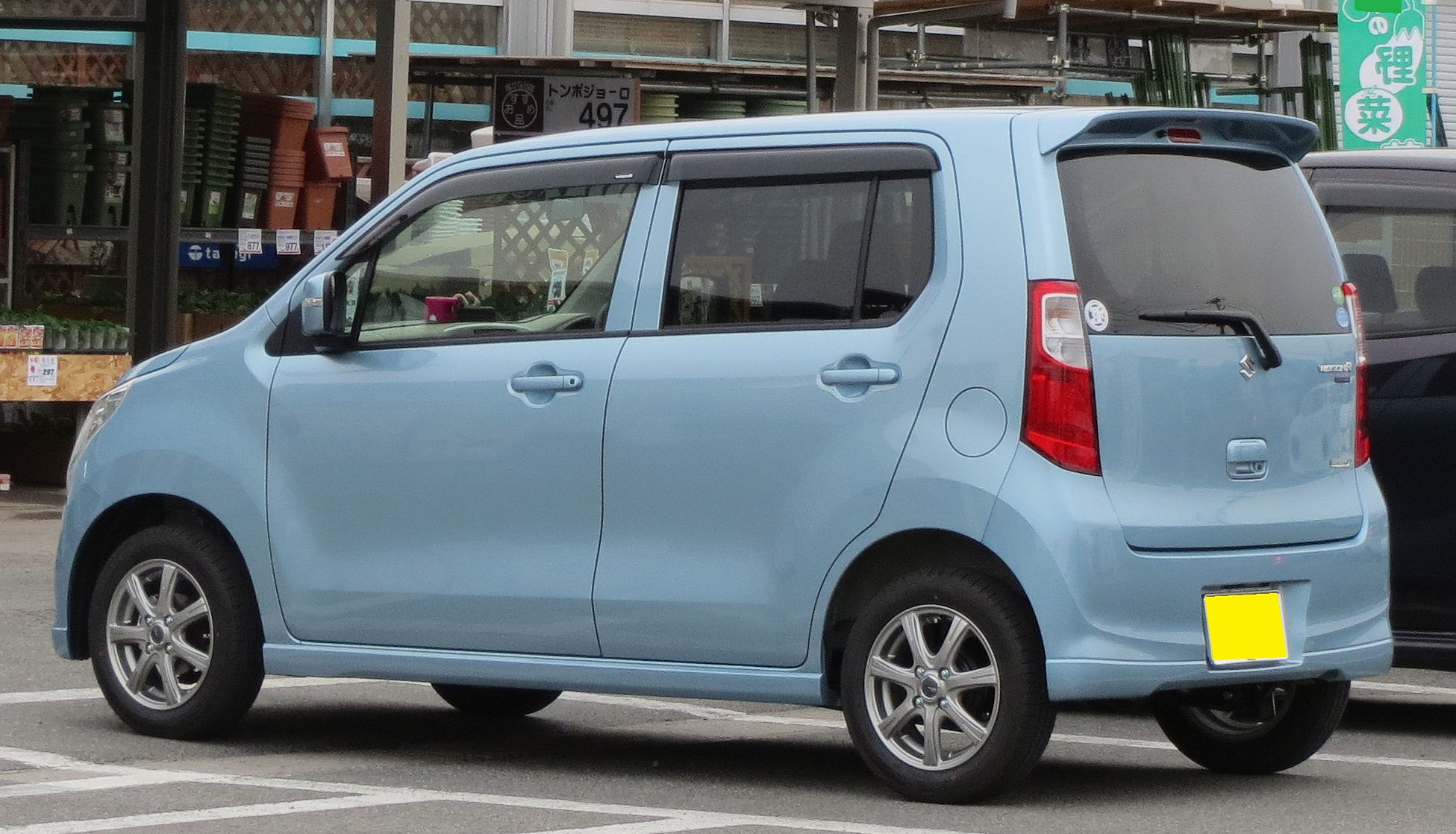
Suzuki Wagon R FX Limited (pre-facelift)

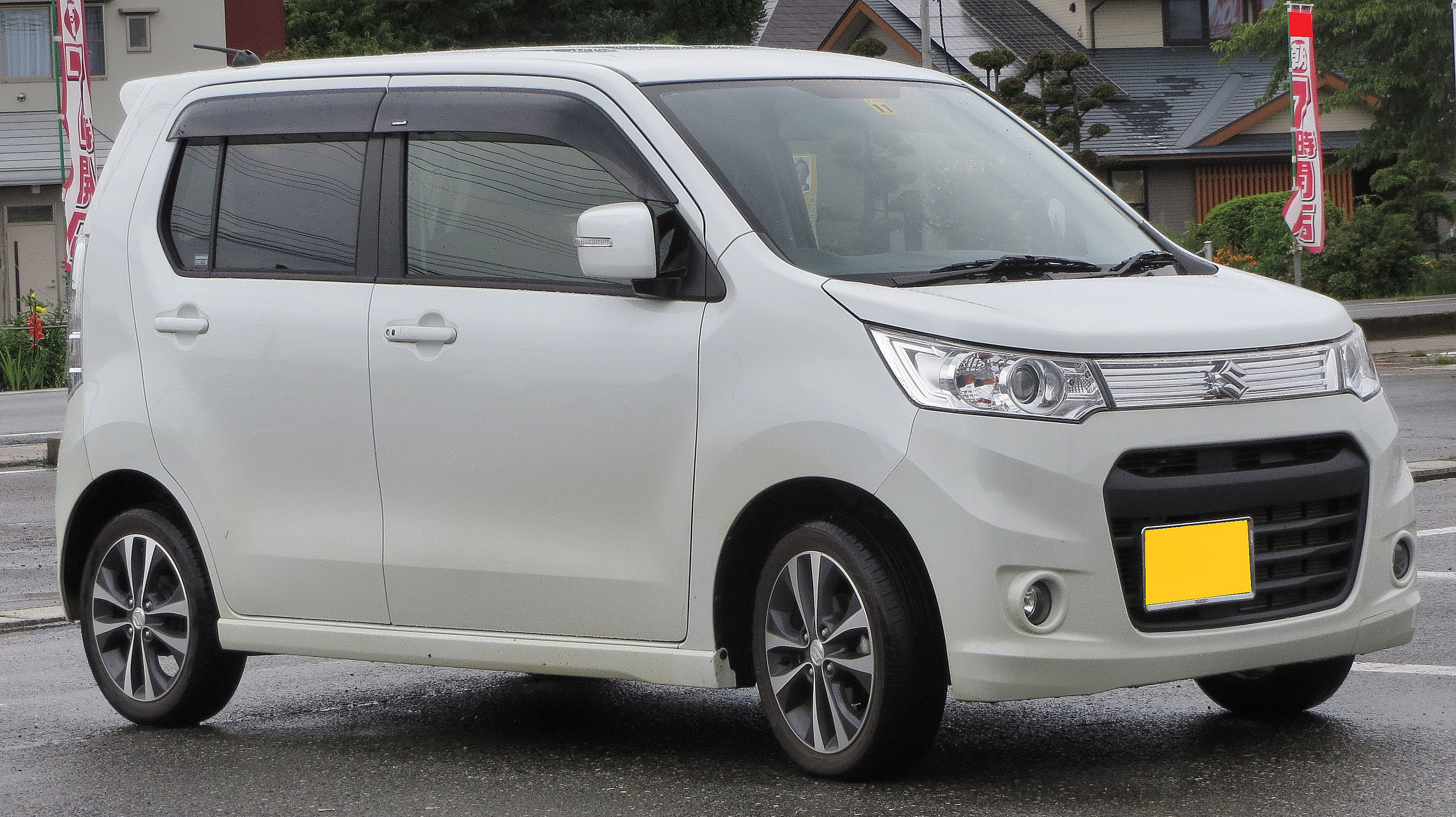
Suzuki Wagon R Stingray T (pre-facelift)

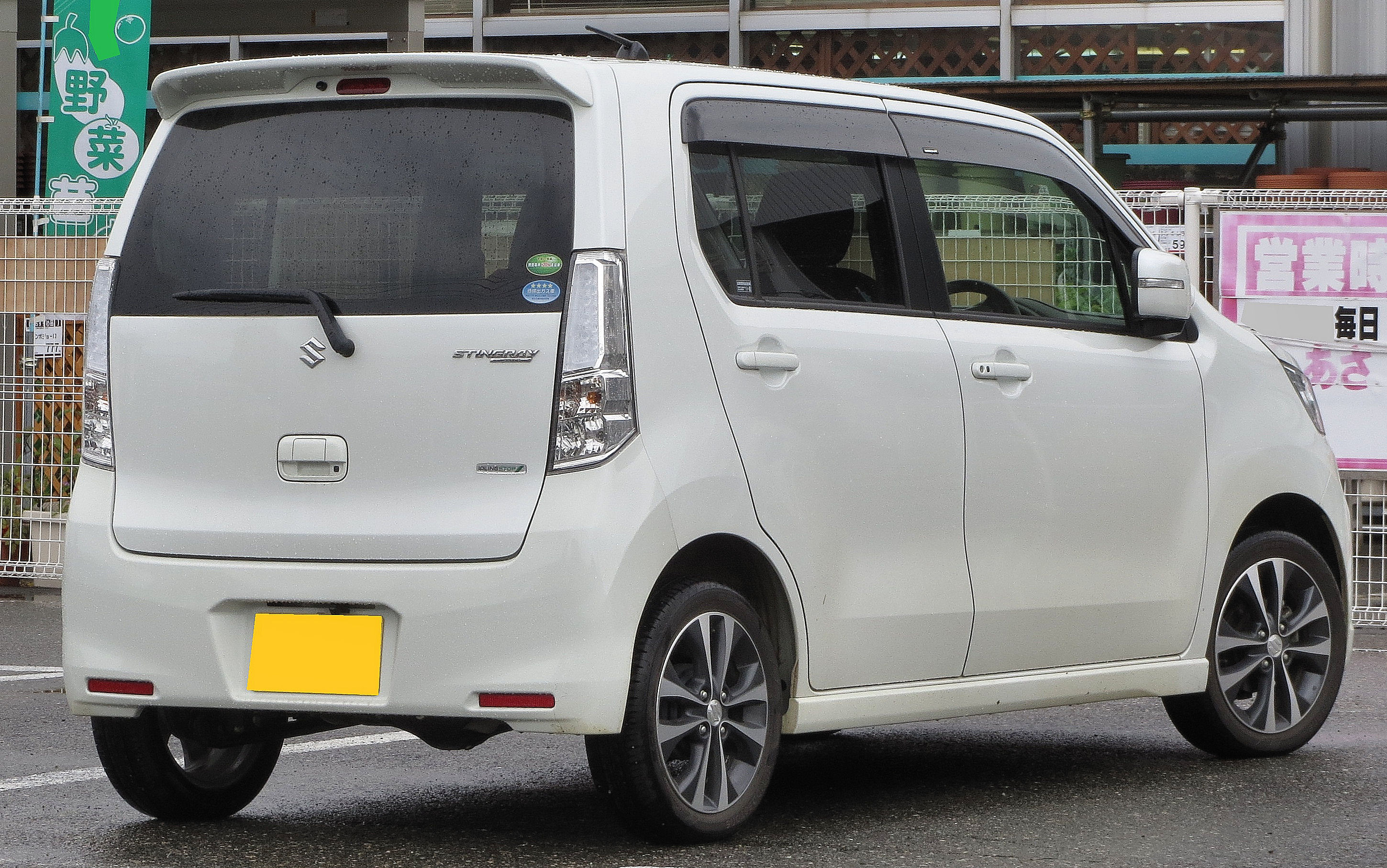
Suzuki Wagon R Stingray T (pre-facelift)

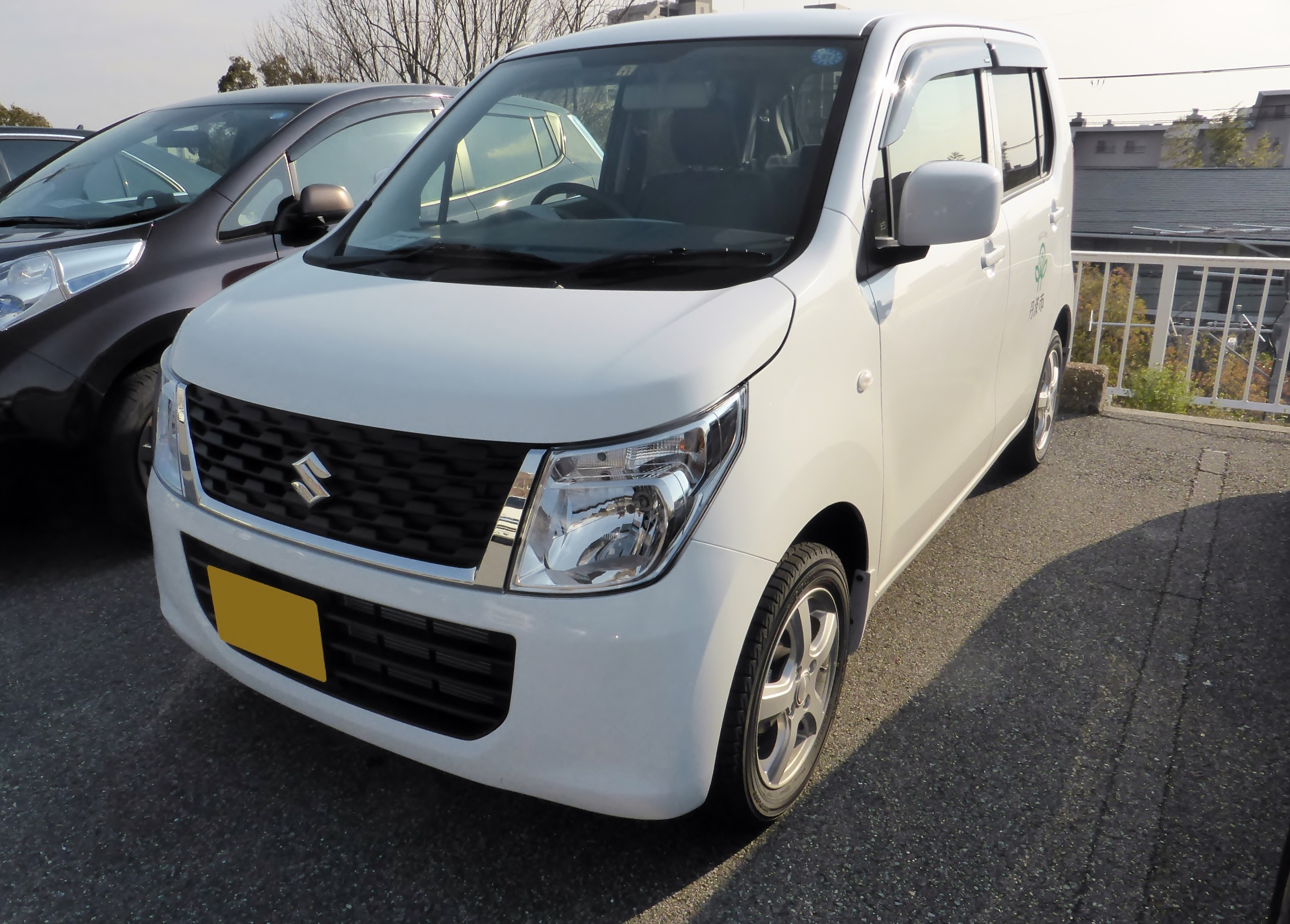
Suzuki Wagon R FX (facelift)

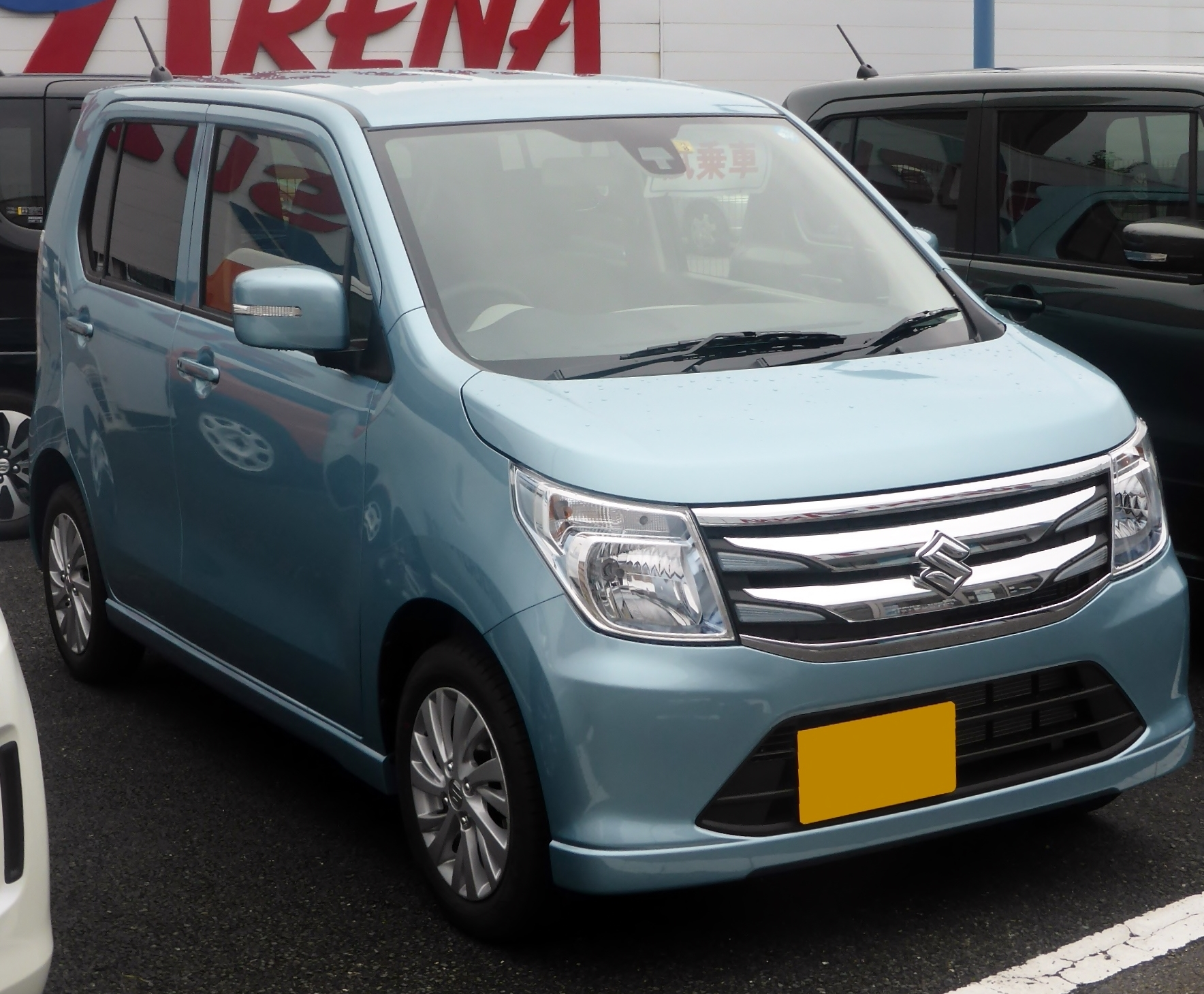
Suzuki Wagon R FZ (facelift)

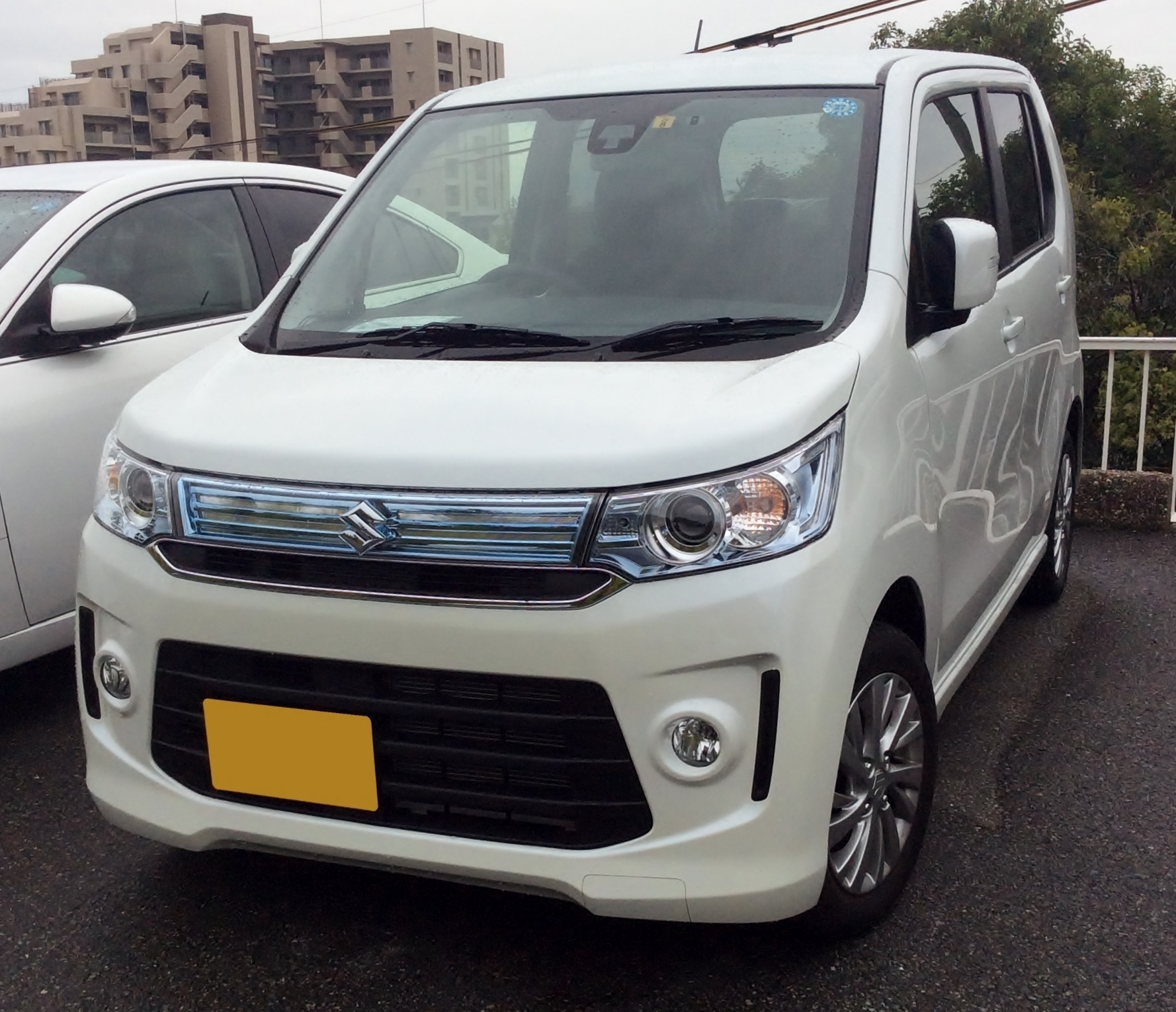
Suzuki Wagon R Stingray X (facelift)

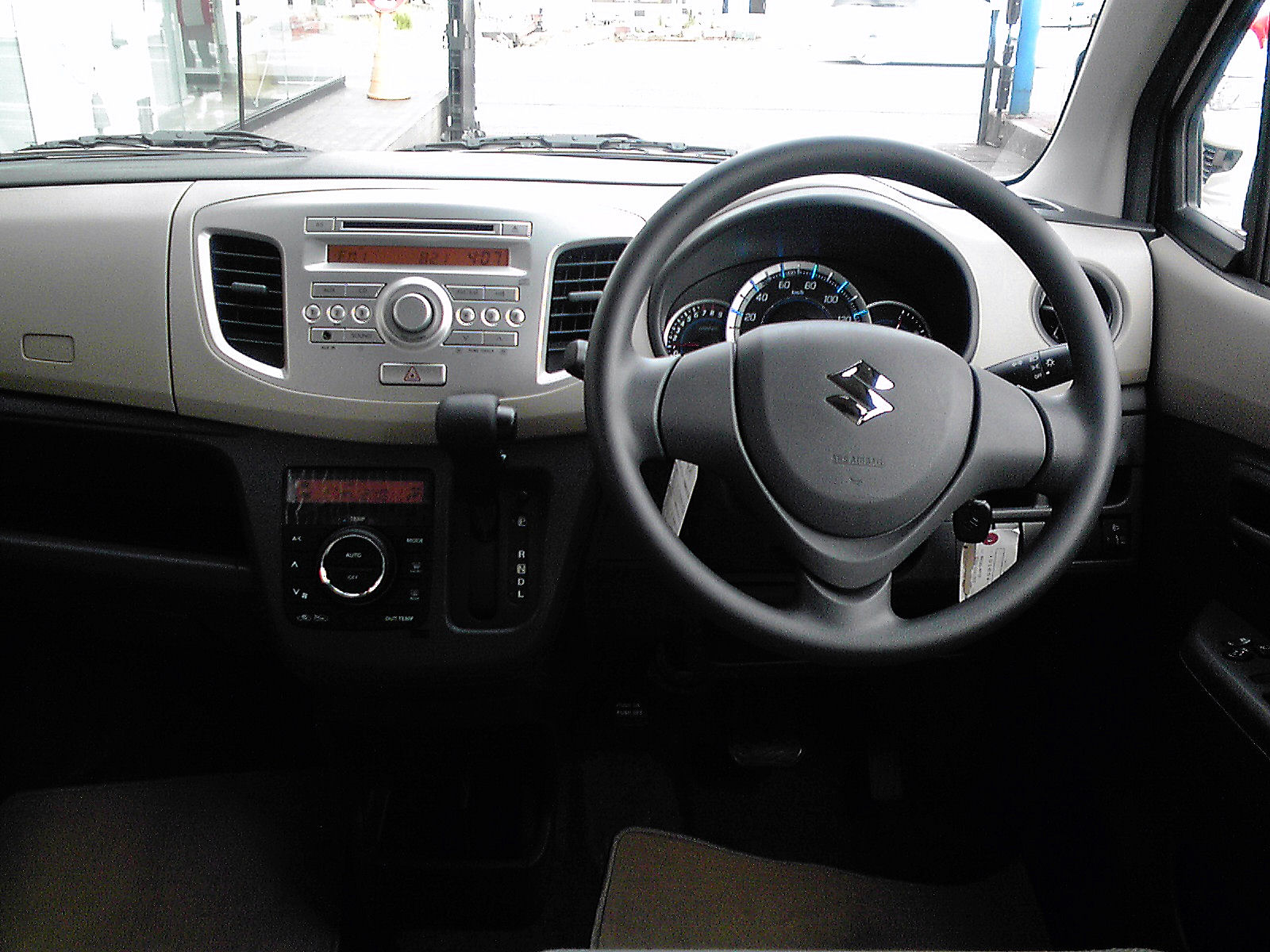
Interior

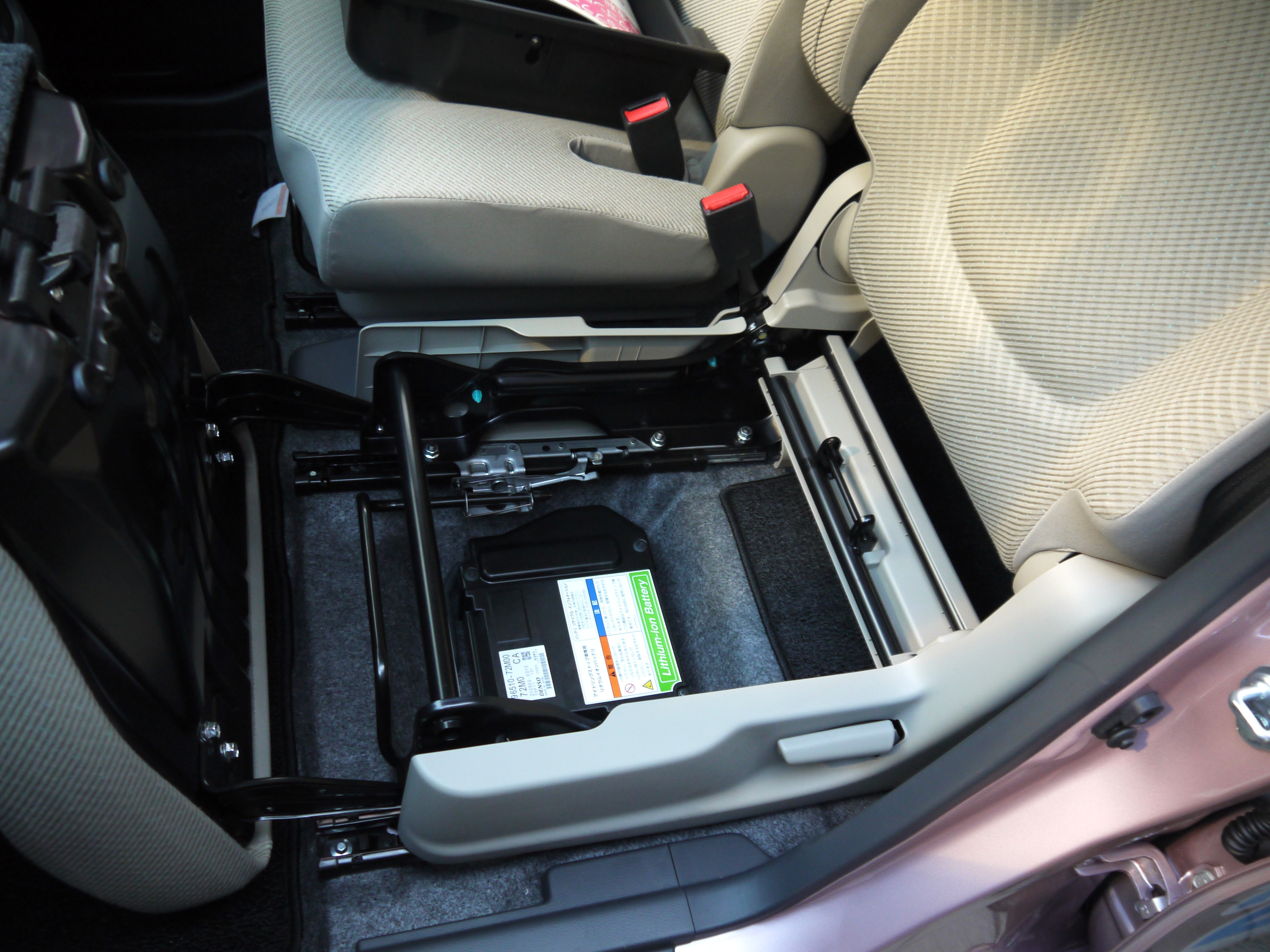
"ENE-CHARGE" Battery

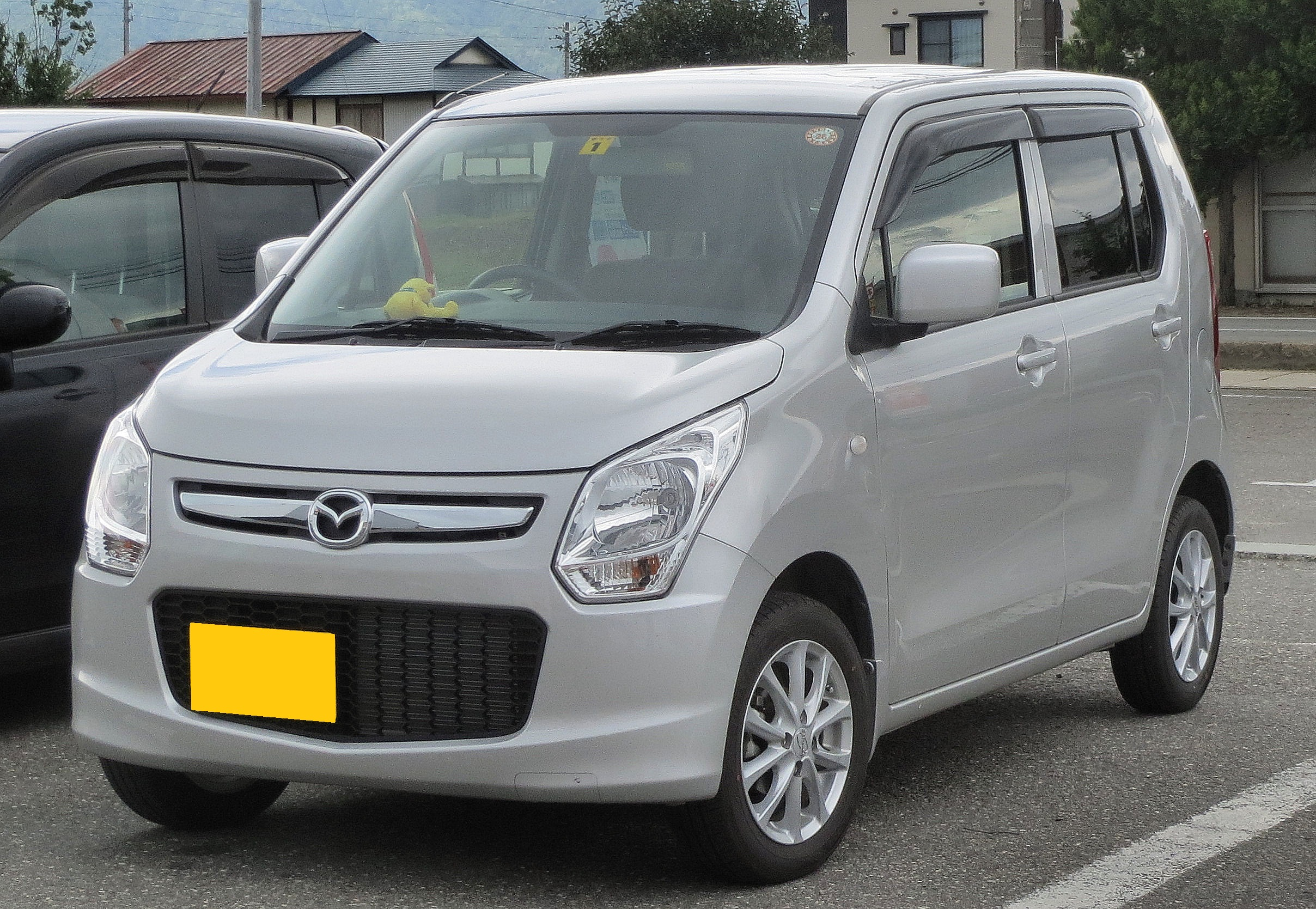
Mazda Flair XG

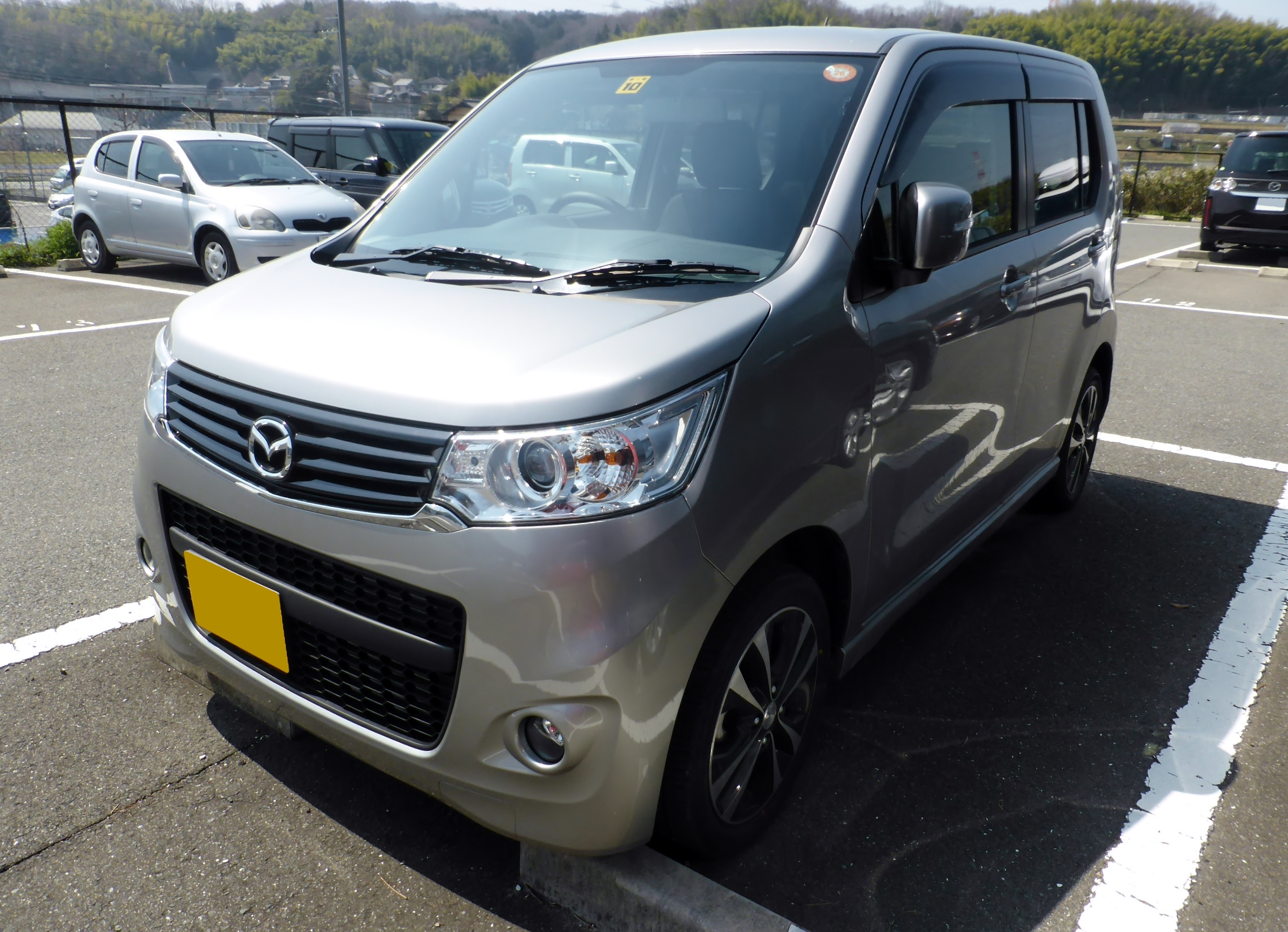
Mazda Flair Custom Style XT

== Sixth generation (MH35S/55S/85S/95S; 2017) ==
Sixth generation
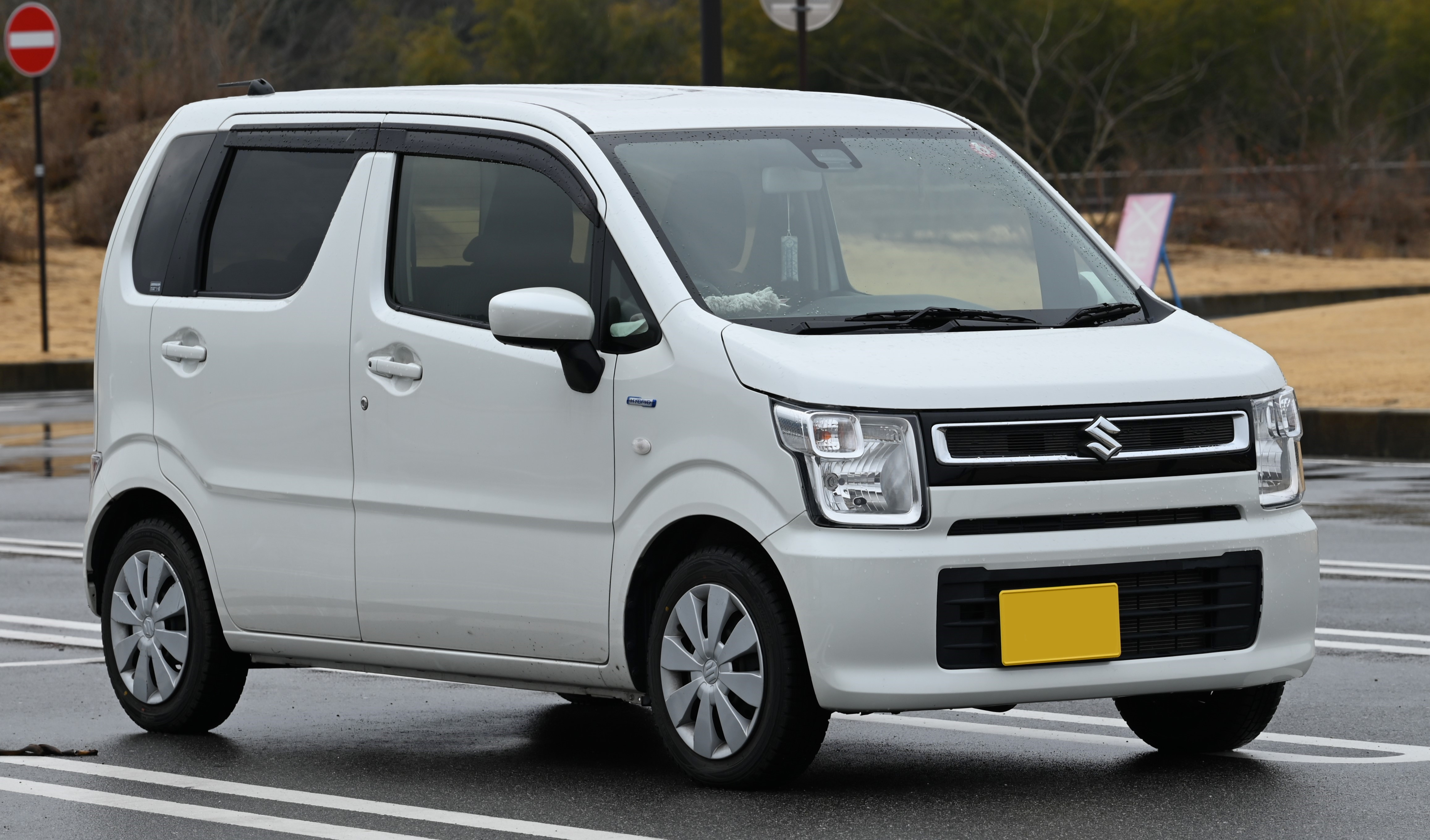
- Suzuki Wagon R Hybrid FX (pre-facelift)

Overview
- Model code: MH35S/55S/85S/95S
- Also called: Mazda Flair
- Production: January 2017 – present

Body and chassis
- Body style: 5-door hatchback
- Platform: HEARTECT platform
- Related: Suzuki Spacia; Suzuki Hustler; Suzuki Alto; Suzuki Wagon R Smile

Powertrain
- Engine: 658 cc R06A DOHC I3 (2017–2020); 658 cc R06D DOHC I3 (2020–present); 658 cc R06A DOHC turbo I3 (2017–2025)
- Electric motor: WA05A; WA05C
- Transmission: CVT; 5-speed manual

Dimensions
- Wheelbase: 2,460 mm (96.9 in)
- Length: 3,395 mm (133.7 in)
- Width: 1,475 mm (58.1 in)
- Height: 1,650 mm (65.0 in)
- Curb weight: 730–850 kg (1,609–1,874 lb)

The sixth generation Wagon R range was launched in Japan on 1 February 2017. This iteration comes with an upgraded ISG (integrated starter generator) and increased capacity for the hybrid battery. Due to the improved battery and ISG, the Wagon R is capable of driving alone on its hybrid battery up to 10 seconds if the speed is kept under 13 km/h (8 mph). A five-speed manual was no longer available, but after a half-year hiatus it made its return in August 2017, only available on the FA model.

Three different designs were available: the regular Wagon R (with a square, friendly theme), the sporty-looking Hybrid FZ with two-tiered headlamps and grille, and the more aggressive, turbocharged Stingray with distinct, trapezoidal headlamps, and a black pearl and chrome grille. On 27 August 2021, a derivative model based on the sixth generation was created, called Smile.

The facelifted regular model was unveiled on 2 August 2022, along with the introduction of the sporty Custom Z model. The Custom Z took over from the Hybrid FZ and is available with either the naturally aspirated or the turbocharged engine. The standard Wagon R was whittled down to the FX and Hybrid FX-S models; the FX was the only Wagon R which was still available with a five-speed manual transmission.

The Wagon R underwent a significant facelift in December 2025, with the lineup consolidated into a single Custom Z-based model featuring a revised grille. The turbocharged engine was discontinued, while the interior was updated with a new steering wheel and instrument cluster. Additionally, trim levels were simplified to the Hybrid ZX and ZL.

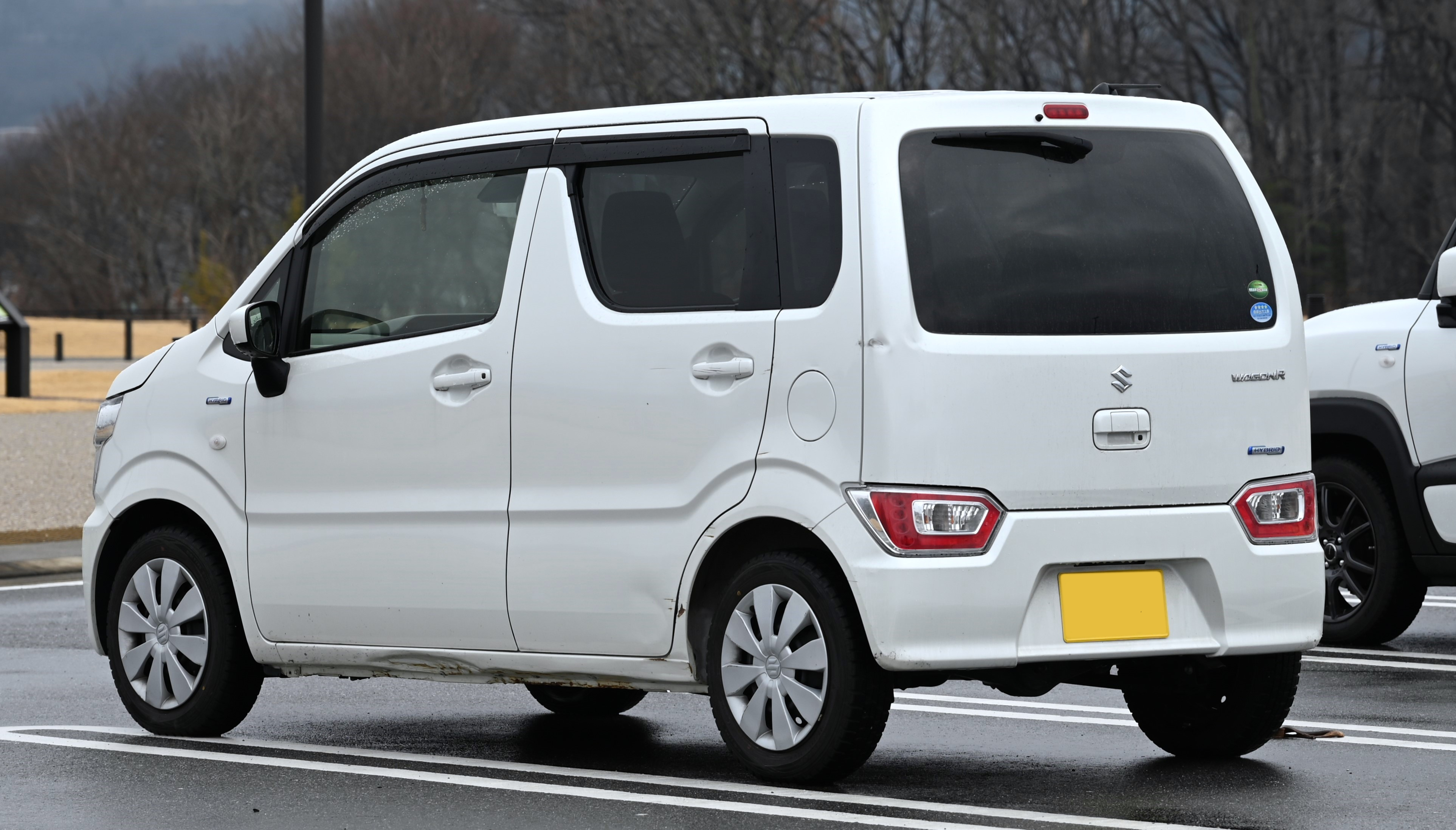
Suzuki Wagon R Hybrid FX (pre-facelift)

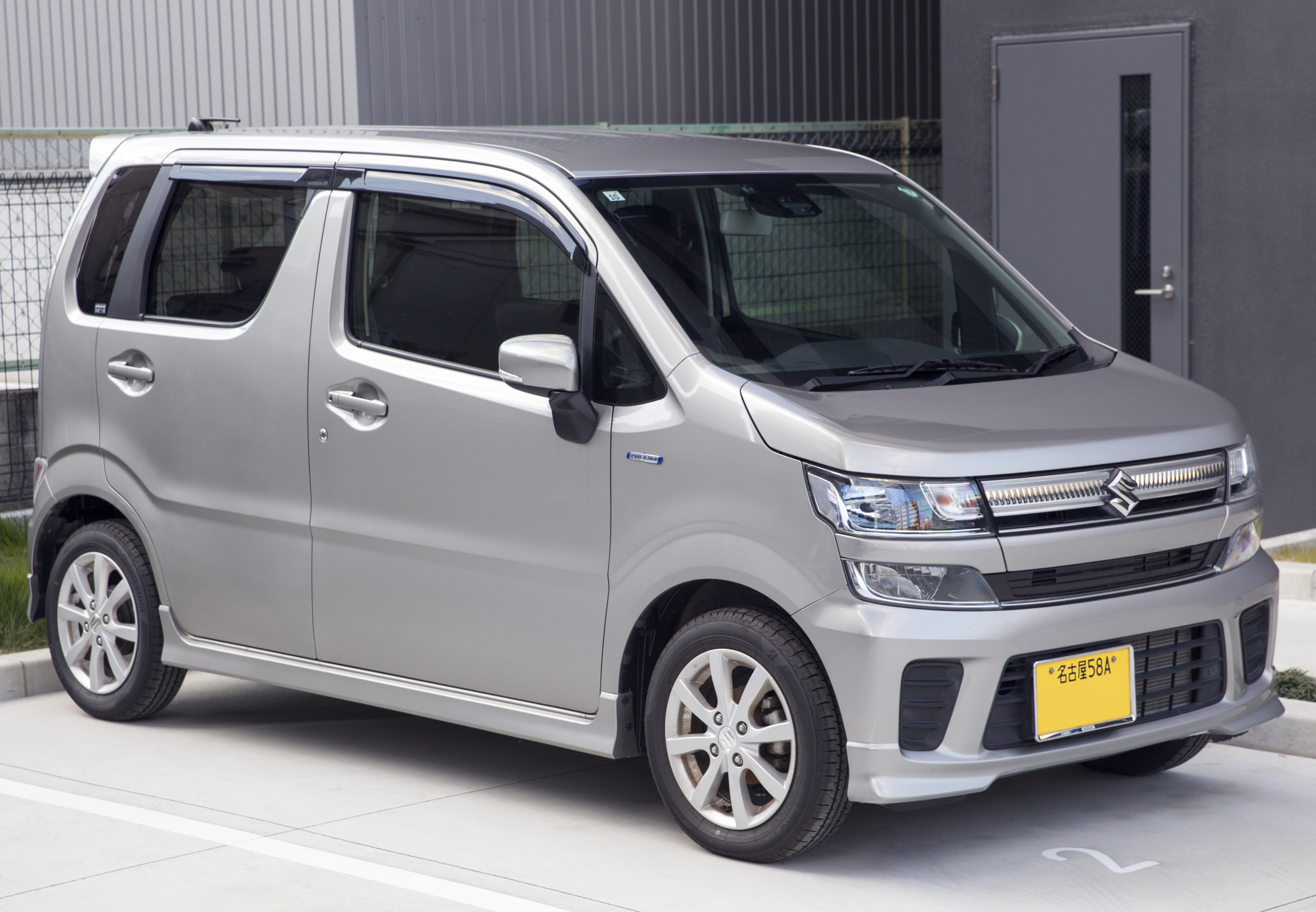
Suzuki Wagon R Hybrid FZ (pre-facelift)

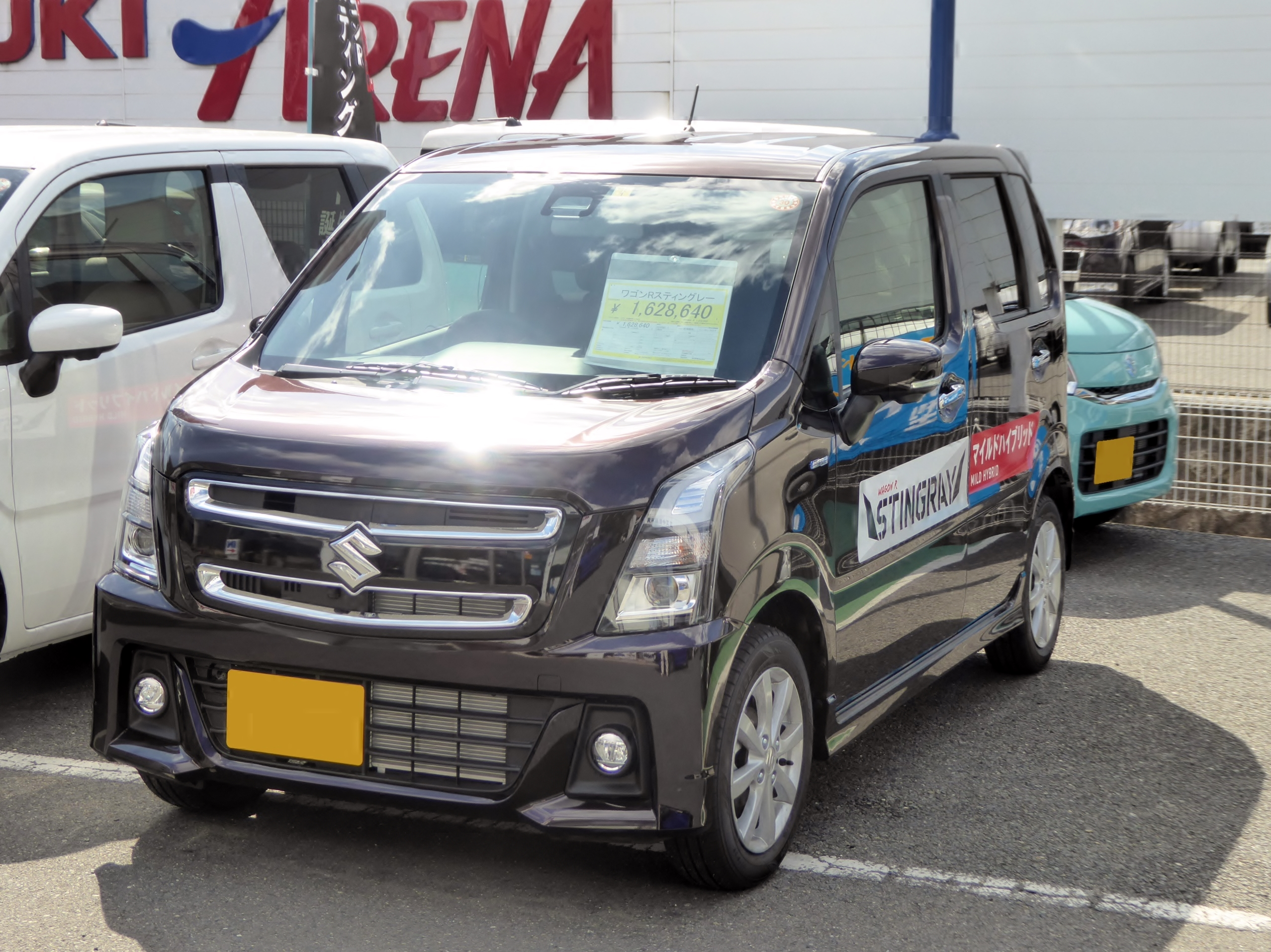
Suzuki Wagon R Stingray Hybrid X

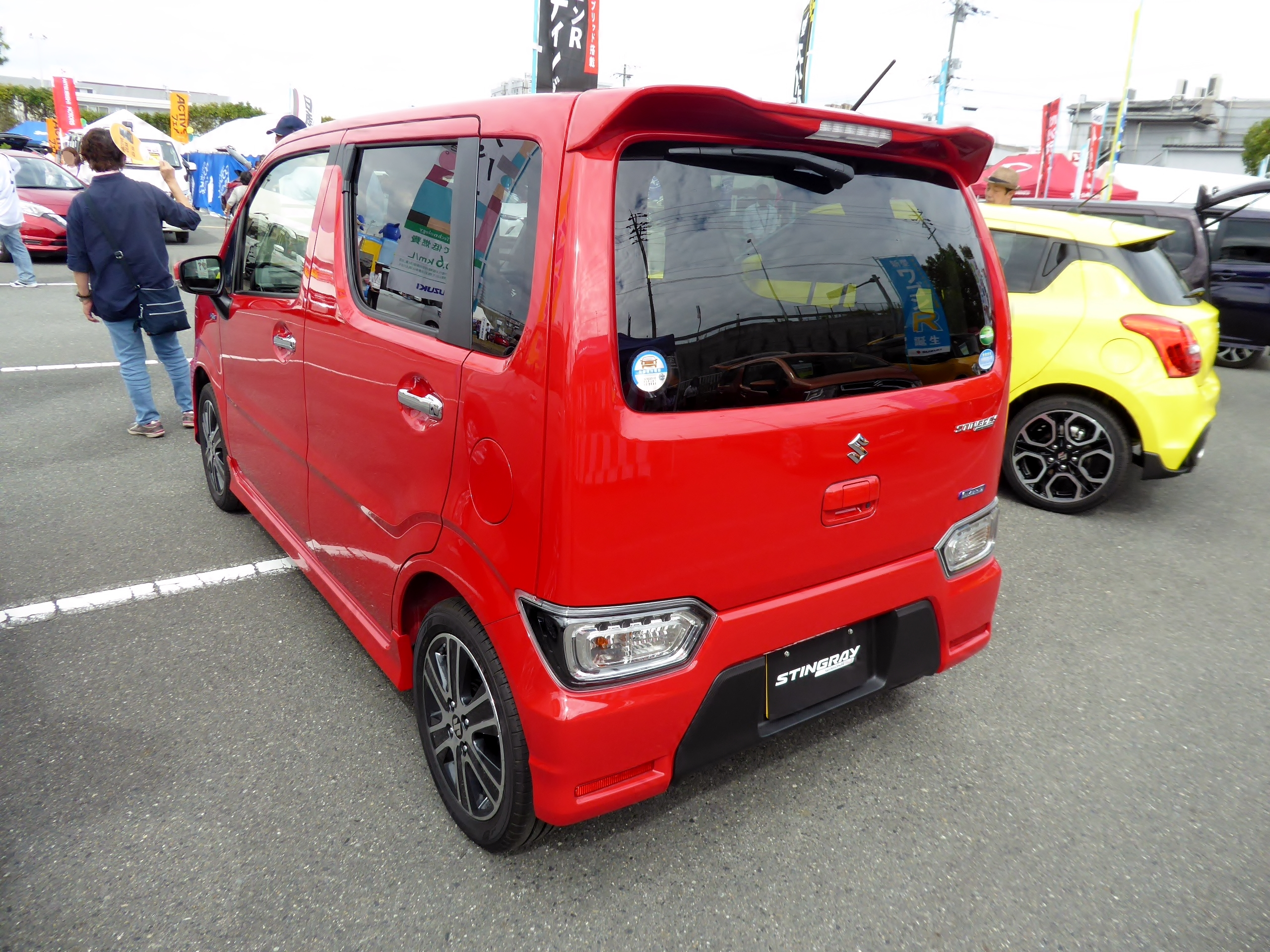
Suzuki Wagon R Stingray Hybrid T

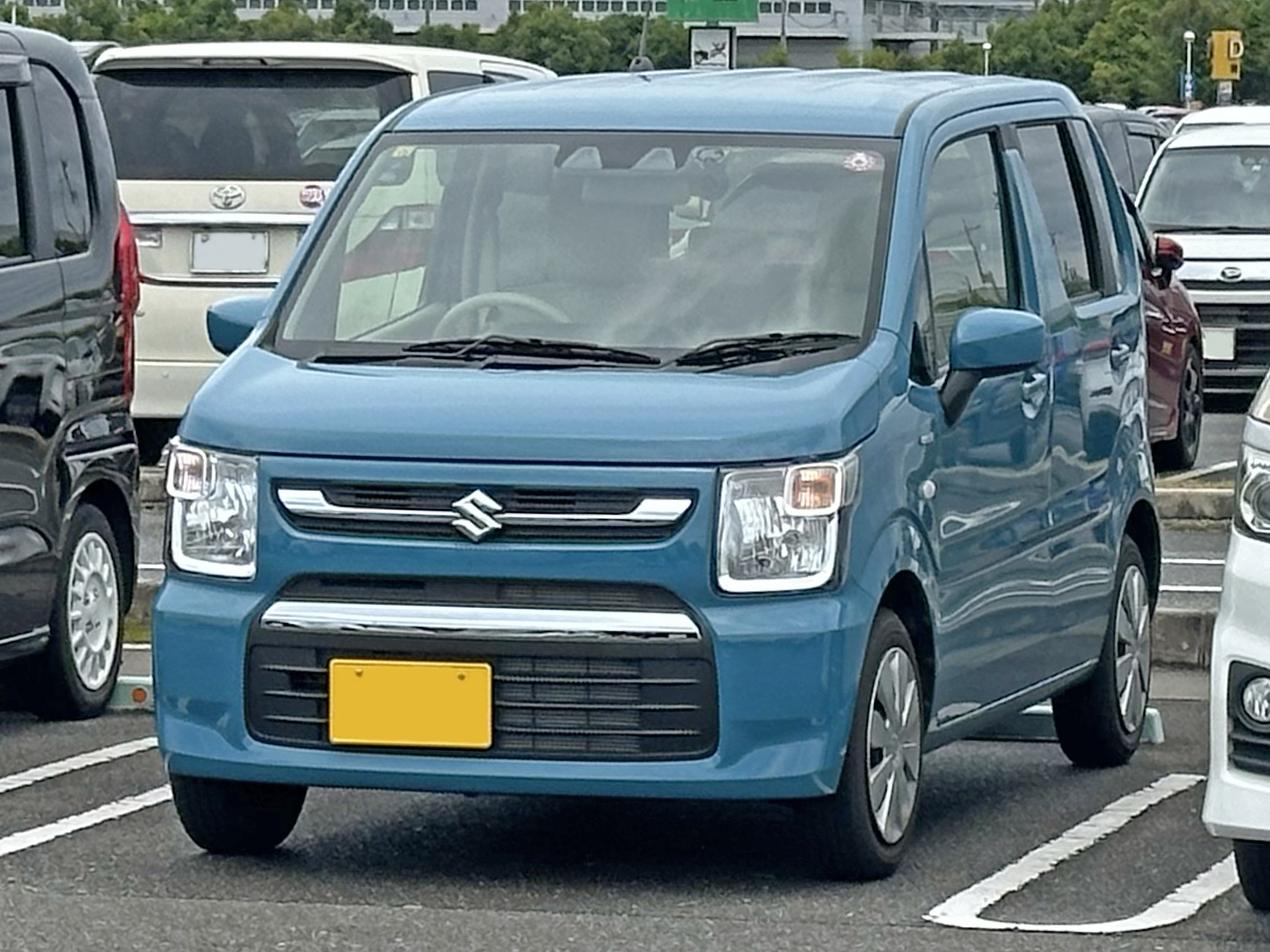
Suzuki Wagon R Hybrid FX-S (first facelift)

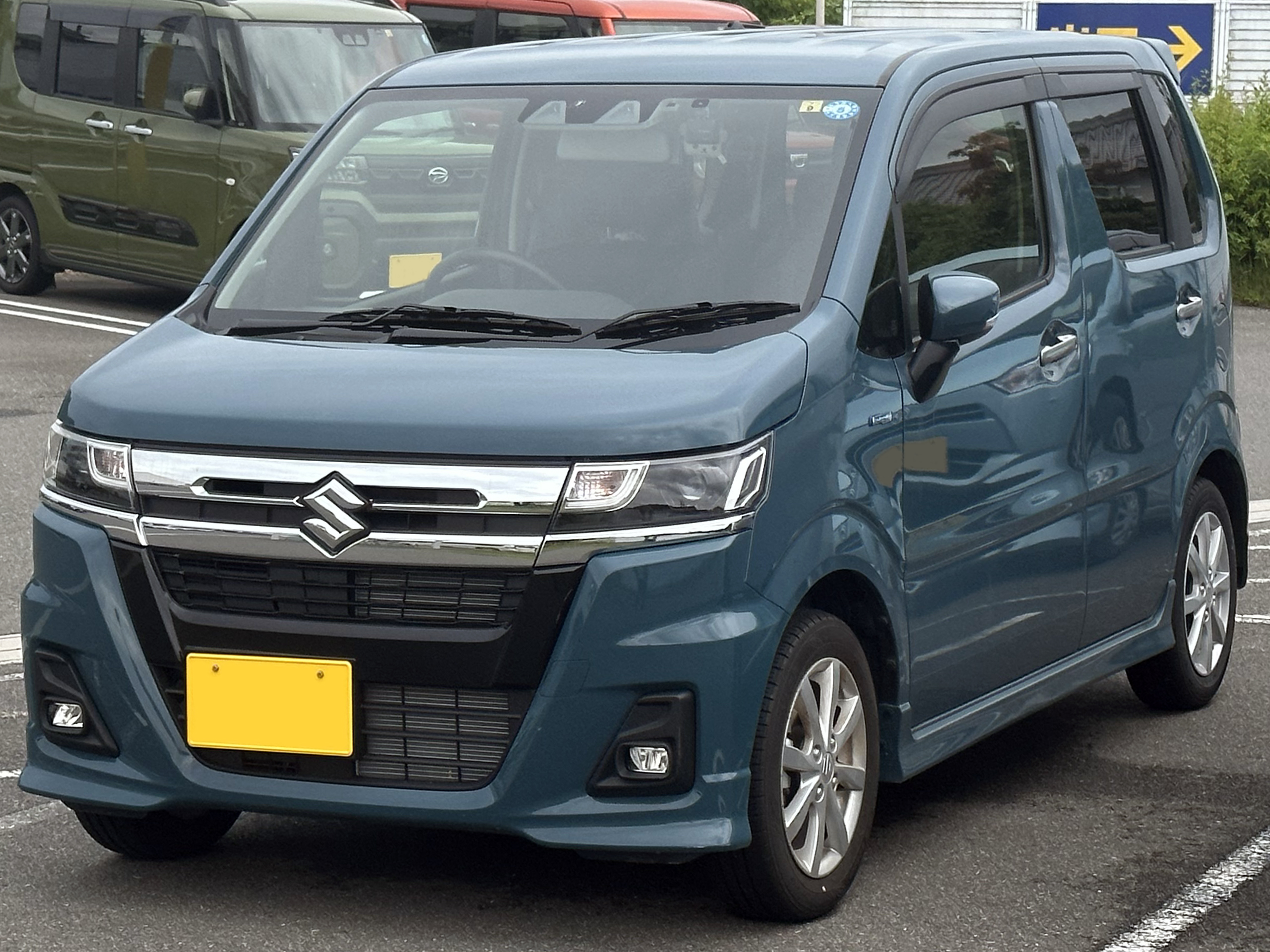
Suzuki Wagon R Custom Z Hybrid ZX (first facelift)

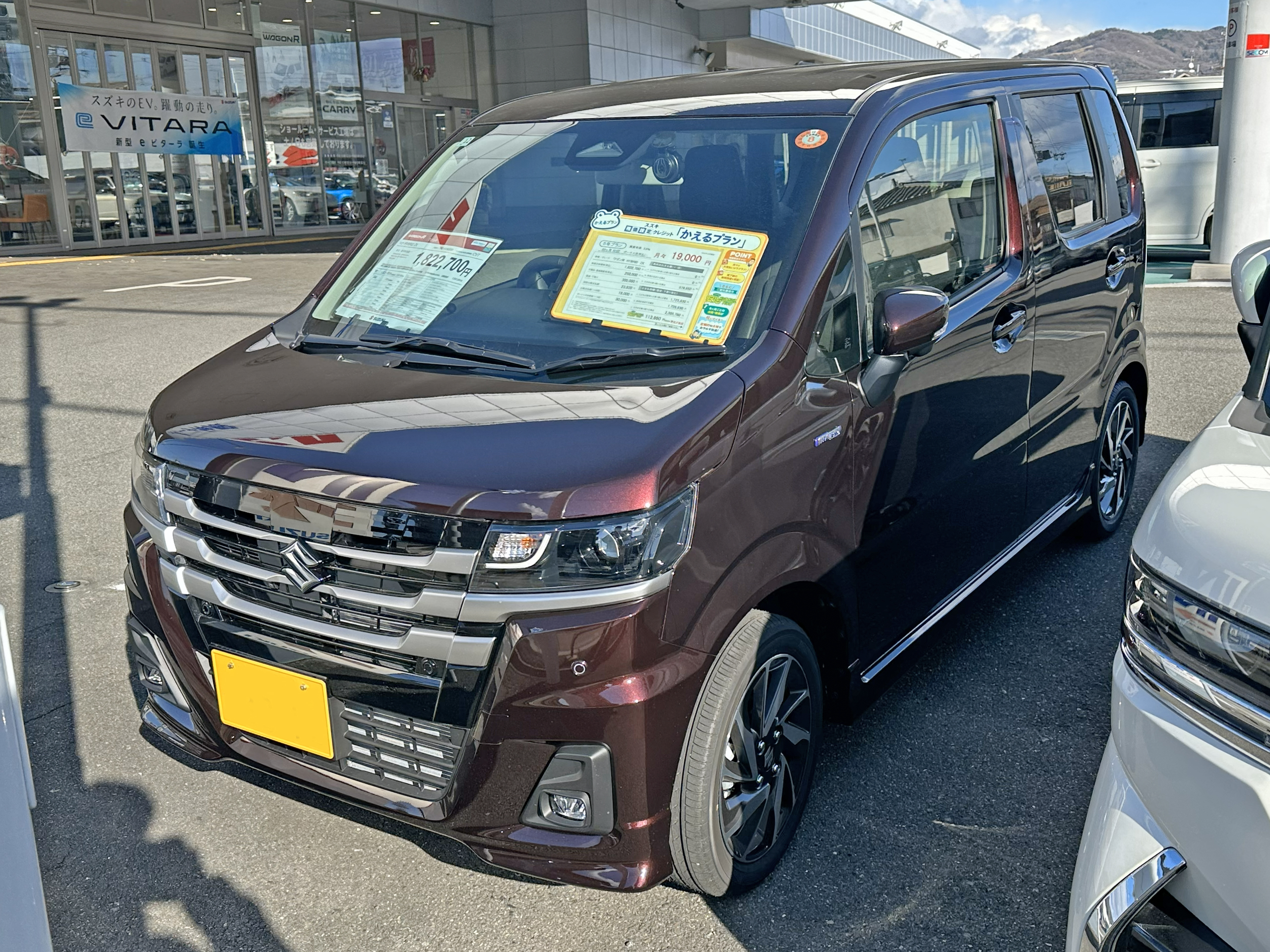
Suzuki Wagon R ZX (second facelift)

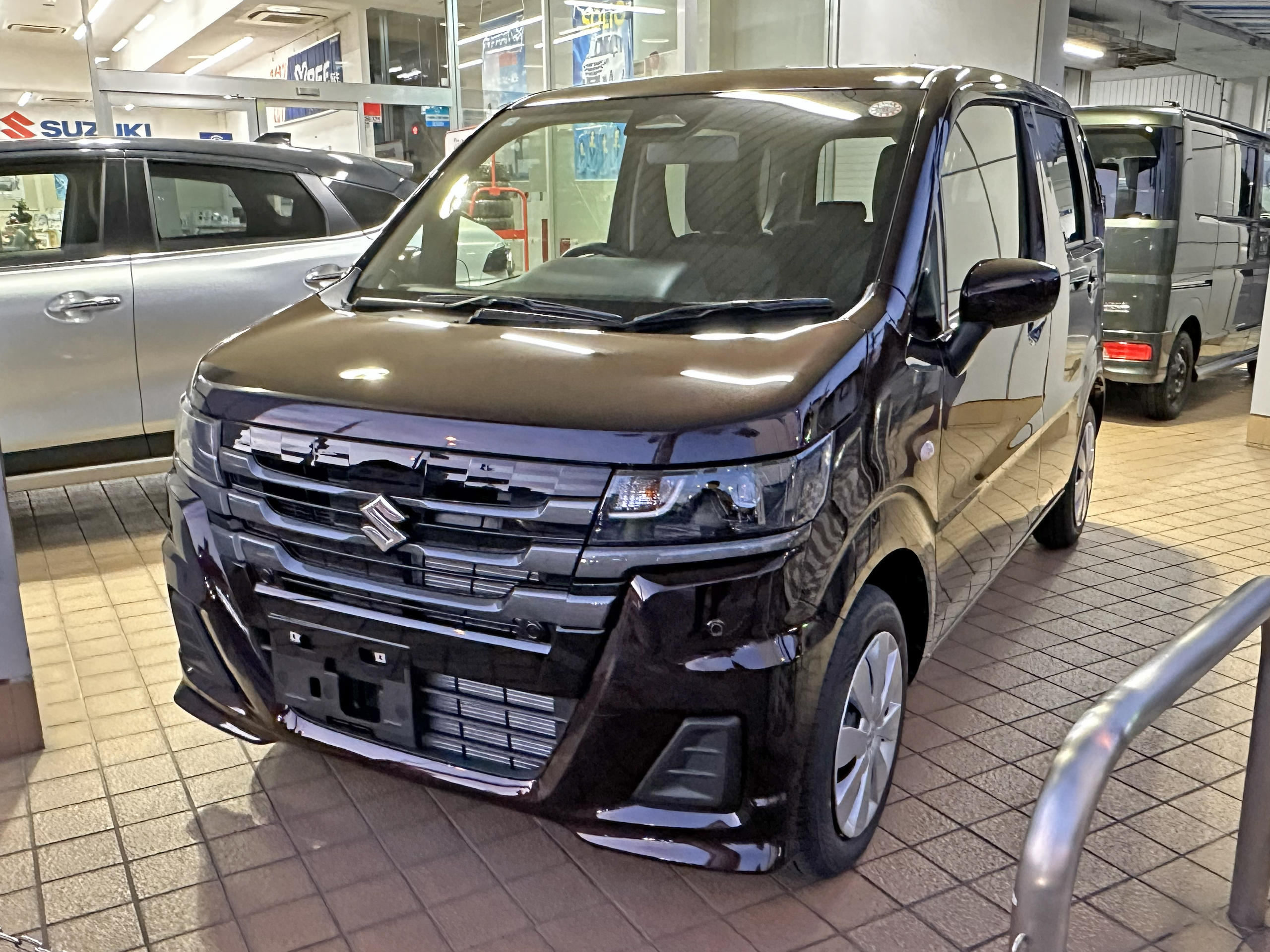
Suzuki Wagon R ZL (second facelift)

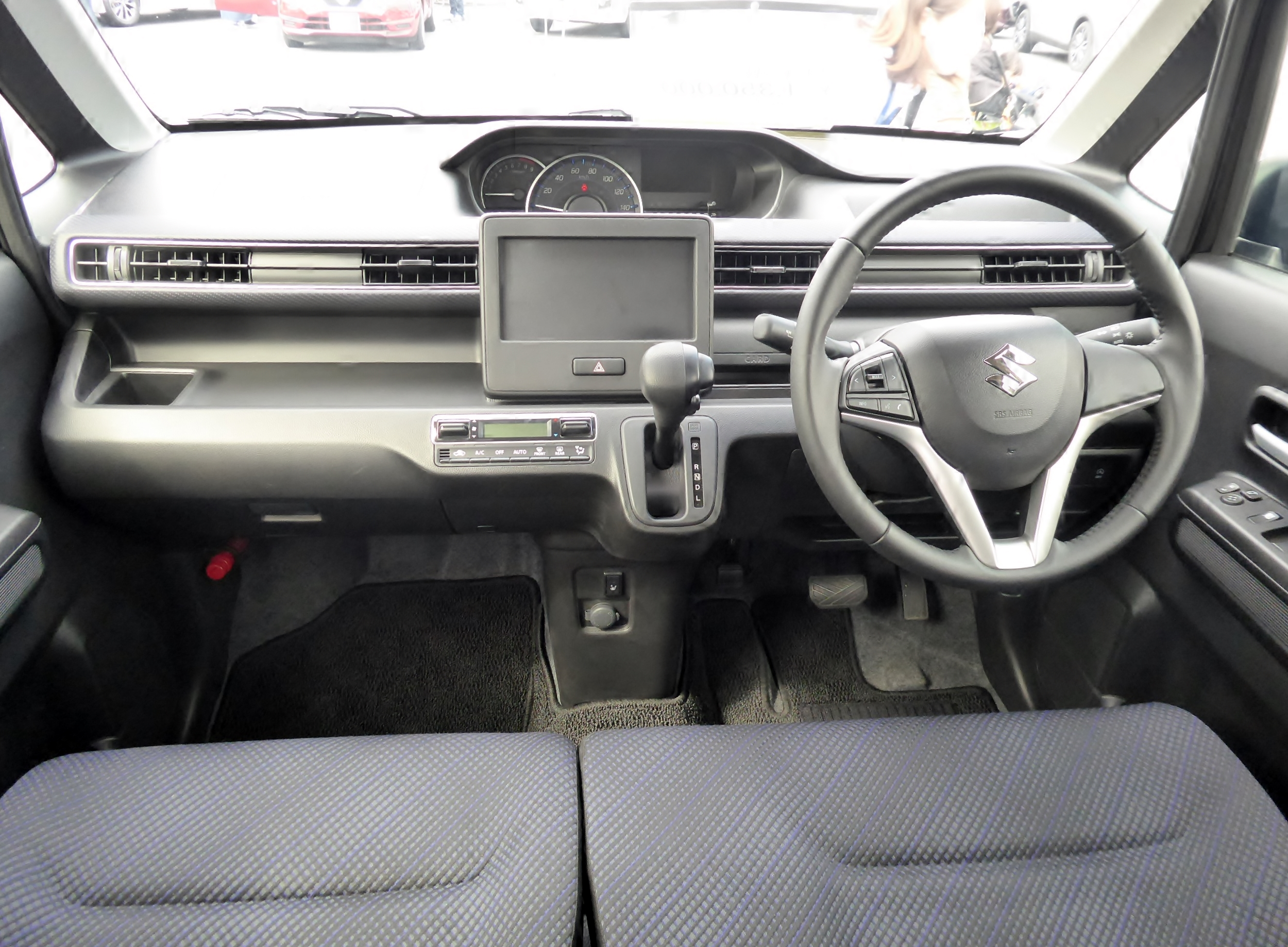
Interior (pre-facelift)

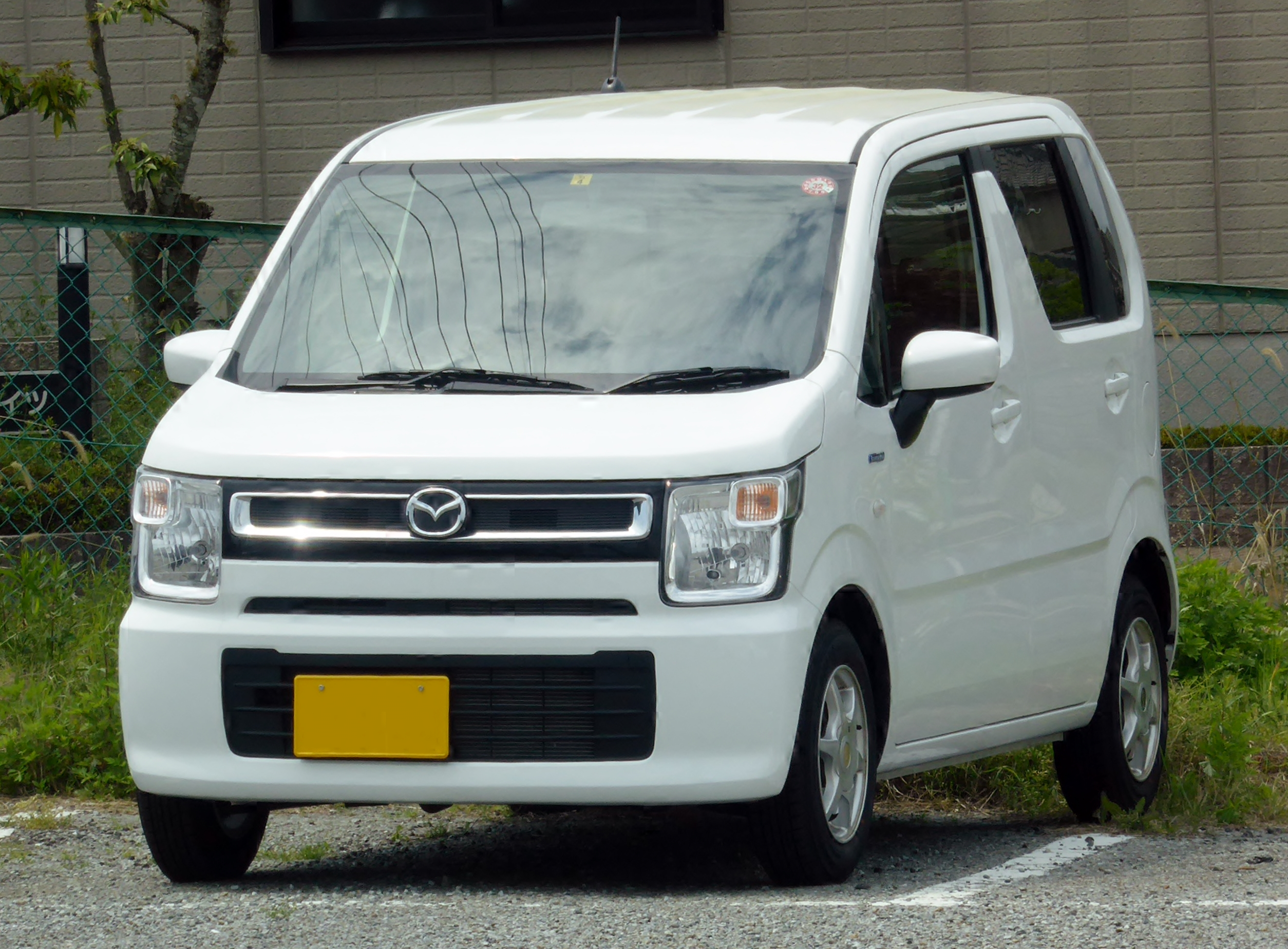
Mazda Flair Hybrid XG (pre-facelift)

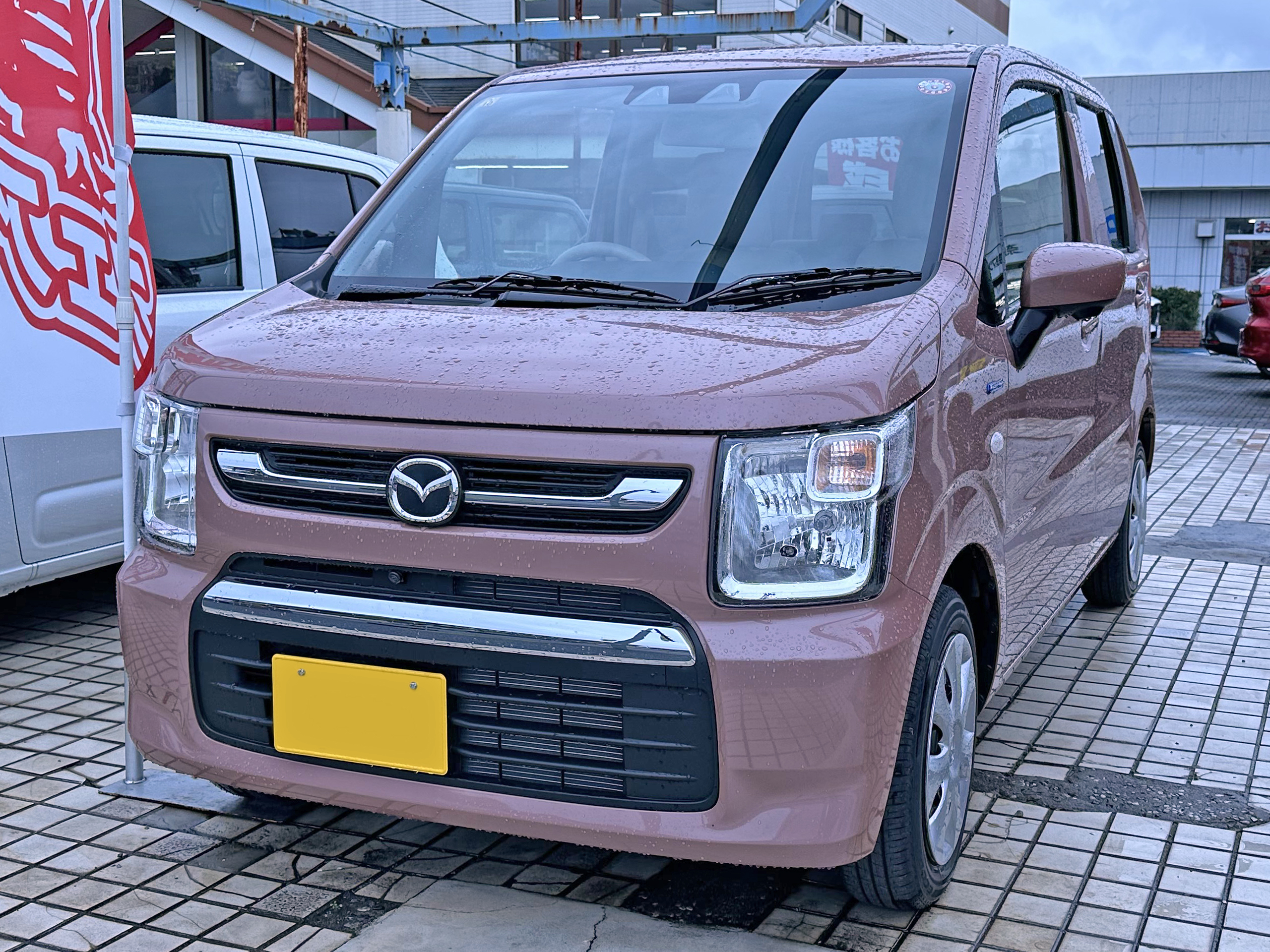
Mazda Flair Hybrid XG (facelift)

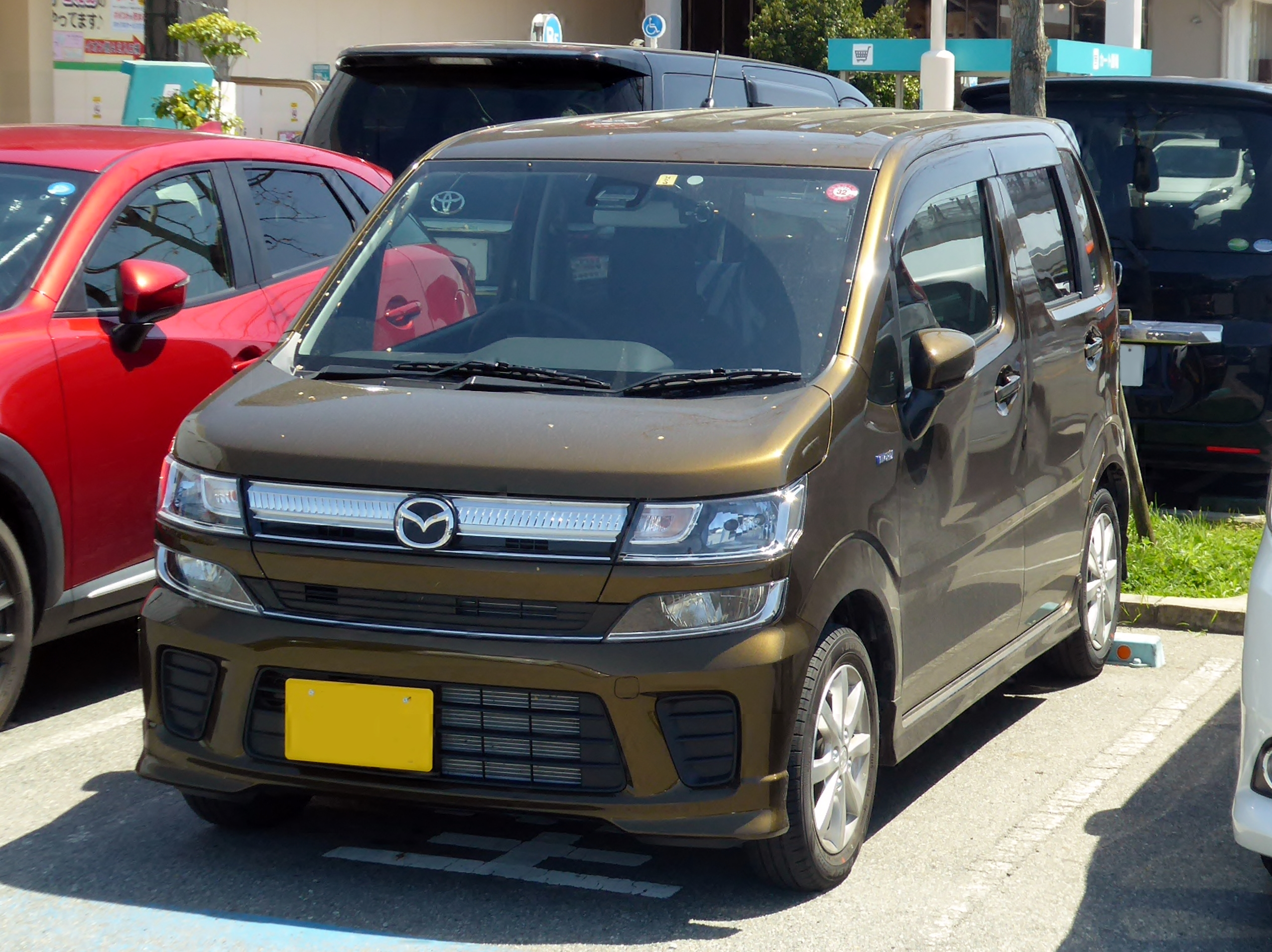
Mazda Flair Hybrid XS (pre-facelift)

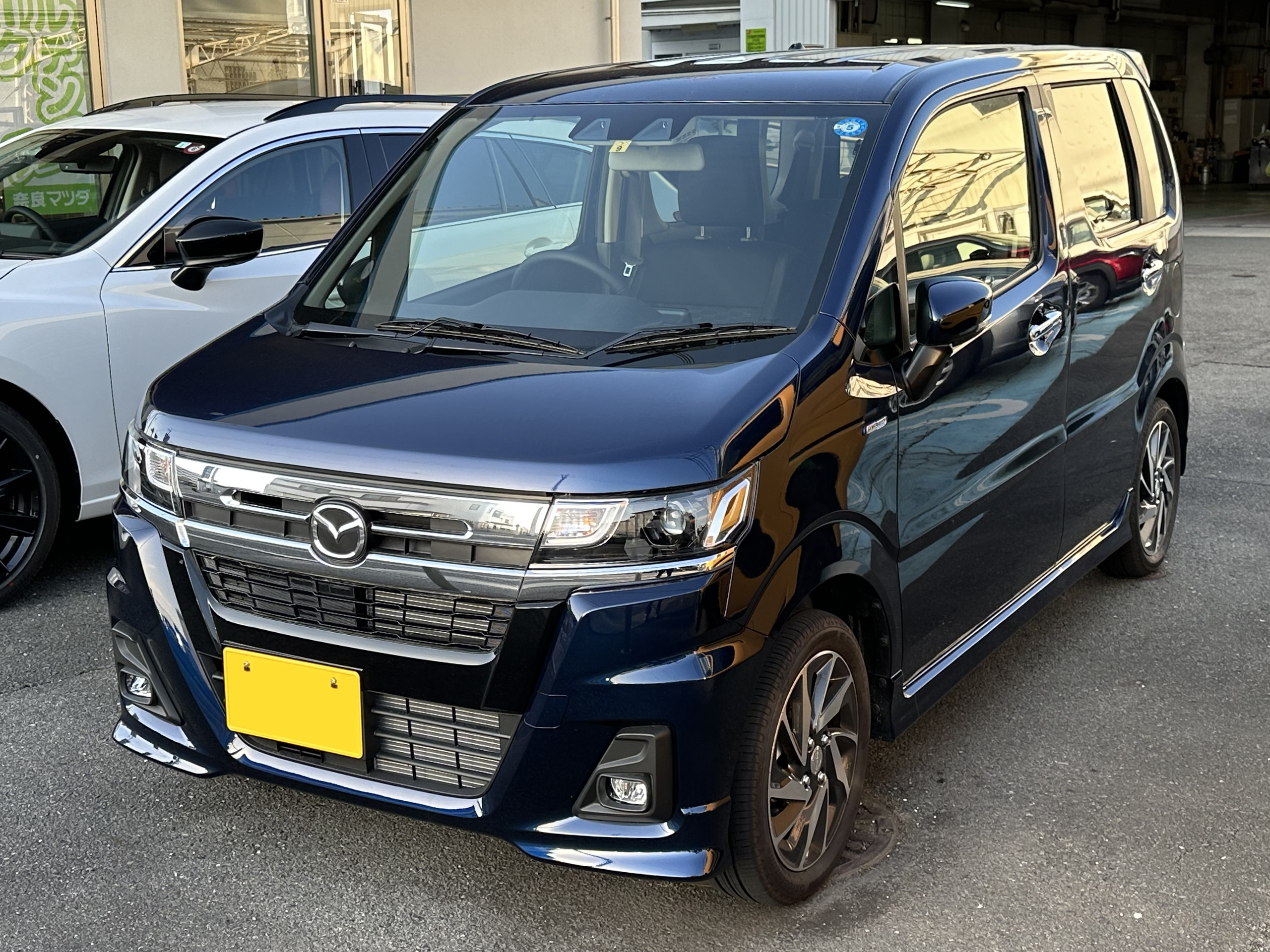
Mazda Flair Hybrid XS (facelift)

== Sales ==
Year	Japan		Indonesia
Year	Wagon R		Karimun
Year	Regular Series	Custom Z	Karimun
1998			92
1999			814
2000			5,749
2001	238,273		3,202
2002	159,891		4,650
2003	177,123		5,105
2004	211,929		3,475
2005	236,702		3,241
2006	221,065		1,288
2007	226,715		
2008	205,352		
2009	201,530		
2010	195,105		
2011	160,440		
2012	195,700		
2013	186,090		
2014	175,367		
2015	108,107		
2016	81,134		
2017	114,710		
2018	108,013		
2019	90,046		
2020	66,061		
2021	68,970		
2022	82,213	35,718	
2023	82,213	72,235	
2024	79,718		
2025	72,274	72,520	
