= Jatco 5R05 transmission =

RE5R05A

Overview
- Manufacturer: Jatco
- Production: 2002–2019

Body and chassis
- Class: 5-speed longitudinal automatic transmission

Chronology
- Predecessor: 4R01; 4R03; 5R01
- Successor: 7R01

The 5R05, also called RE5R05A (Nissan part), JR507E/JR509E (Jatco part) or TG5C/TG5D "5EAT" (Subaru part), is a Jatco 5-speed automatic transmission, released in 2002, used in rear wheel drive or 4X4 vehicles with longitudinal engines. It shares little to nothing in common with the older 5R01 transmission.

== Specifications ==
=== ATF ===
Its OEM ATF is the Original NISSAN ATF Matic J, for worldwide applications. Only for USA, this was superseded by Matic S in 2009.

For Subaru applications the fluid must conform to ATF-HP specifications. This is available from the dealer as relabeled Idemitsu fluid. Valvoline produces a blue bottled "Import Multi Vehicle" fluid that is applicable to all of North America while the red bottled "Max life ATF" is not applicable to vehicles operated in California. Castrol Transmax J and Pennzoil ATF-J are also approved fluids.

=== Gear ratios ===
Type/Gear	1	2	3	4	5	R
A - 95X1A	3.827	2.368	1.519	1.000	0.834	2.613
B - 98X5B, 99X5B	3.842	2.353	1.529	1.000	0.839	2.765
C - 90X02, 90X69, 91X14, 91X78, 92X12	3.540	2.264	1.472	1.000	0.834	2.370

== Applications ==
- Kia Sorento 2003-2009
- Kia Borrego 2010-2012
- Infiniti FX35 2003–2009
  - 2003–2008 VQ35DE
- Infiniti G35 2003–2009
  - 2003–2006 VQ35DE
  - 2007–2009 VQ35HR
- Infiniti G37
  - 2008 VQ37VHR
- Infiniti M45 2003–2004
  - 2003–2004
- Infiniti Q45 2002-2006
  - 2002-2006
- Nissan 350Z 2003–2008.
  - 2003–2006 VQ35DE (Type A).
  - 2007–2008 VQ35HR (Type B).
- Nissan Armada (1st generation)
  - 2004–2016 VK56DE (Type A).
- Nissan Navara (D40) 2005–2009.
  - QR25DE, VQ40DE (Type B).
  - YD25DDTi (Type A).
- Nissan Pathfinder (R51) 2005–2012.
  - VQ40DE (Type B).
  - VK56DE, YD25DDTi (Type A).
- Nissan Patrol (Y61) 2002–2010.
  - TB48DE (Type C).
- Nissan Stagea (M35) 2002-2007.
  - VQ25DET
  - 2004–2007 VQ35DE (Type C)
- Nissan Titan (A60) 2003–2015. VK56DE (Type A).
- Nissan Xterra (N50) 2005–2015. VQ40DE (Type B).
- Subaru Legacy (fourth generation) 2005–2009.
  - 3.0R EZ30.
- Subaru Legacy (fifth generation) 2010–2014.
  - 3.6R EZ36.
- Subaru Outback (third generation) 2005–2009.
  - 3.0R EZ30.
- Subaru Outback (fourth generation) 2010–2014.
  - 3.6R EZ36.
- Subaru Tribeca 2006–2014.
