= Jatco 4N71 transmission =

L4N71B/E4N71B

Overview
- Manufacturer: Jatco
- Production: 1983–1997

Body and chassis
- Class: 4-speed longitudinal automatic transmission

Chronology
- Predecessor: 3N71
- Successor: 4R01

The 4N71 was a 4-speed automatic transmission from Nissan Motors. It was available as either a light-duty ("L4N71B") or medium-duty ("E4N71B") unit for rear wheel drive vehicles with longitudinal engines. The latter used an electronically controlled lock up torque converter.

== L4N71B ==
Applications:

- 1983–1984 Nissan Maxima
- 1984–1988 Nissan 200SX
- 1984–1989 Dodge/Chrysler Conquest
- 1984–1986 Plymouth Conquest
- 1984–1988 Mazda RX-7
- 1984–1989 Mitsubishi Starion
- 1986–1989 Nissan Pathfinder
- 1986–1989 Mazda Pickup
- 1986–1989 Nissan Pickup
- 1986–1990 Nissan Pintara
- 1987–1990 Nissan Van
- 1990–1993 Mazda Pickup
- 1991–1997 Mazda Miata

== E4N71B ==
Applications:

- 1984–1989 Nissan 300ZX
- 1984–1989 Dodge/Chrysler Conquest
- 1986–1990 Nissan Skyline
- 1986–1988 Holden Commodore (VL), 3.0-liter models
- 1987–1988 Nissan 200SX
- 1984–1986 Nissan Laurel
- 1986–1987 Nissan Pick Up
- 1989–1995 Mazda MPV
- 1988– 1996 London Taxi Fairway and Fairway Driver

== See also ==
- List of Jatco transmissions
