= List of Jatco transmissions =

Motor vehicle automatic transmissions

Nissan and its transmission subsidiary spinoff, Jatco, have produced a large number of automatic transmissions for many car makers.

== Naming ==
The first Nissan/Jatco transmission, the Jatco 3N71 transmission, used a simple naming scheme: the "3" meant "3-speed", and the remainder was the series number. Beginning in 1982, it gained a locking torque converter (L3N71b) for greater efficiency. (See L3N71 link below.) In 1983, an overdrive section was introduced (L4N71b), culminating with preliminary electronic sensors and control functions being added in 1985 (E4N71b), and proceeding with the initial "R" for "rear wheel drive" with the RL4R01A/RE4R01A. This same system was used with the RL3F01A front wheel drive transaxle and its descendants through the RE4F04A.

Jatco has switched to a new naming scheme starting with a "J" for Jatco, then "F" or "R" for front- or rear-wheel drive. The next digit is the number of gears, while the model series is now two digits sequentially. The model series names were not directly mapped – for instance, the model designation changed when the RE4F04A was renamed to JF403E, while the RE4R03A became the JR403E.

Many OEM users assign their own model numbers.

== Conventional automatic transmissions ==
=== Longitudinal engine rear-wheel drive transmissions ===
- 1969–1989 3-speed 3N71 (Nissan: L3N71B)
- 1983–1990 4-speed 4N71
  - Jatco: JR401/JR401E
  - Nissan: L4N71B/E4N71B
  - Mazda: N4A-EL
- 1988–2004 4-speed 4R01
  - Jatco: JR402/JR402E
  - Nissan: RL4R01A/RE4R01A/RE4R01B
  - Mazda: R4A-EL
- TBD–TBD 4-speed 4R03
  - Jatco: JR403E
  - Nissan: RE4R03A/RG4R01A
- TBD–TBD 4-speed JR405E
  - Mazda: RC4A-EL
- 1989–TBD 5-speed 5R01
  - Jatco: JR502E/JR503E
  - Nissan: RE5R01A
- 2002–present 5-speed 5R05
  - Jatco: JR507E/JR509E
  - Nissan: RE5R05A
- 2008–present 7-speed 7R01
  - Jatco: JR710E
  - Nissan: RE7R01A
  - Infiniti EX37
  - Infiniti QX70 (3.5 & 3.7)
  - Infiniti G (from 2008)
  - Infiniti M (from 2008)
  - Nissan 370Z/Nissan Fairlady Z (Z34)
  - Nissan Skyline (V36, V37), Skyline Coupe (CV36)
  - Nissan Fuga/Cima (Y51)
  - Nissan Navara (D23)
  - Nissan Terra (WD23)
- 2008–present 7-speed heavy duty 7R011E
  - Nissan RE7R01B
  - Infiniti FX/QX70 (5.0 & 3.0d)
  - Nissan Armada/Patrol(Y62)
  - Nissan Fuga/Cima (Y51) (V8 and Hybrid)
- 2019–present 9-speed JR913E (Model 9AT, Type JR913E), original design by Mercedes-Benz, Jatco variant modified and produced by Jatco under license for Nissan and Infiniti vehicles (in reference to the JR913E only)

=== Transverse engine front-wheel drive transaxles ===
- 1982–1990 3-speed RL3F01A/RN3F01A
- 1982–1985 4-speed RL4F01A
- 1985–1994 4-speed RE4F02A/RL4F02A
- 1991–2001 4-speed RE4F03A/RL4F03A
- 1992–2001 4-speed RE4F04A/RE4F04V
  - GEO/Isuzu 4F20E/JF403E
  - Mazda LJ4A-EL
- 3-speed ultra lightweight kei car
  - Suzuki Alto, Mazda Carol
- 3-speed high-performance kei car
  - Mitsubishi eK Wagon
  - Mitsubishi Minica
  - Nissan Otti
- 3-speed high-performance compact
  - Proton Perdana
- 4-speed ultra lightweight kei car
  - Mitsubishi eK Active, Classy, Sport, Wagon, i
  - Nissan Otti
- 4-speed ultra-light compact JF405E (formerly JF402E)
  - Suzuki Wagon-R
  - Suzuki MR Wagon
  - Nissan Moco
  - Mazda AZ-Wagon
  - Mazda Laputa
  - Hyundai Atoz
  - Kia Morning
  - Daewoo Matiz
- 4-speed ultra-light compact JF404E
  - VW Polo
  - VW Lupo
  - SEAT Arosa
  - Škoda Fabia
- 4-speed compact
  - Nissan Tiida
  - Nissan Note
  - Nissan March
  - Nissan Wingroad
  - Nissan Bluebird Sylphy
  - Renault Samsung SM3
- 4-speed small/medium
  - Mitsubishi Grandis
  - Mitsubishi Galant
  - Mitsubishi Lancer
  - Mitsubishi Lancer Wagon
- 4-speed medium
  - Mitsubishi Lancer Cargo

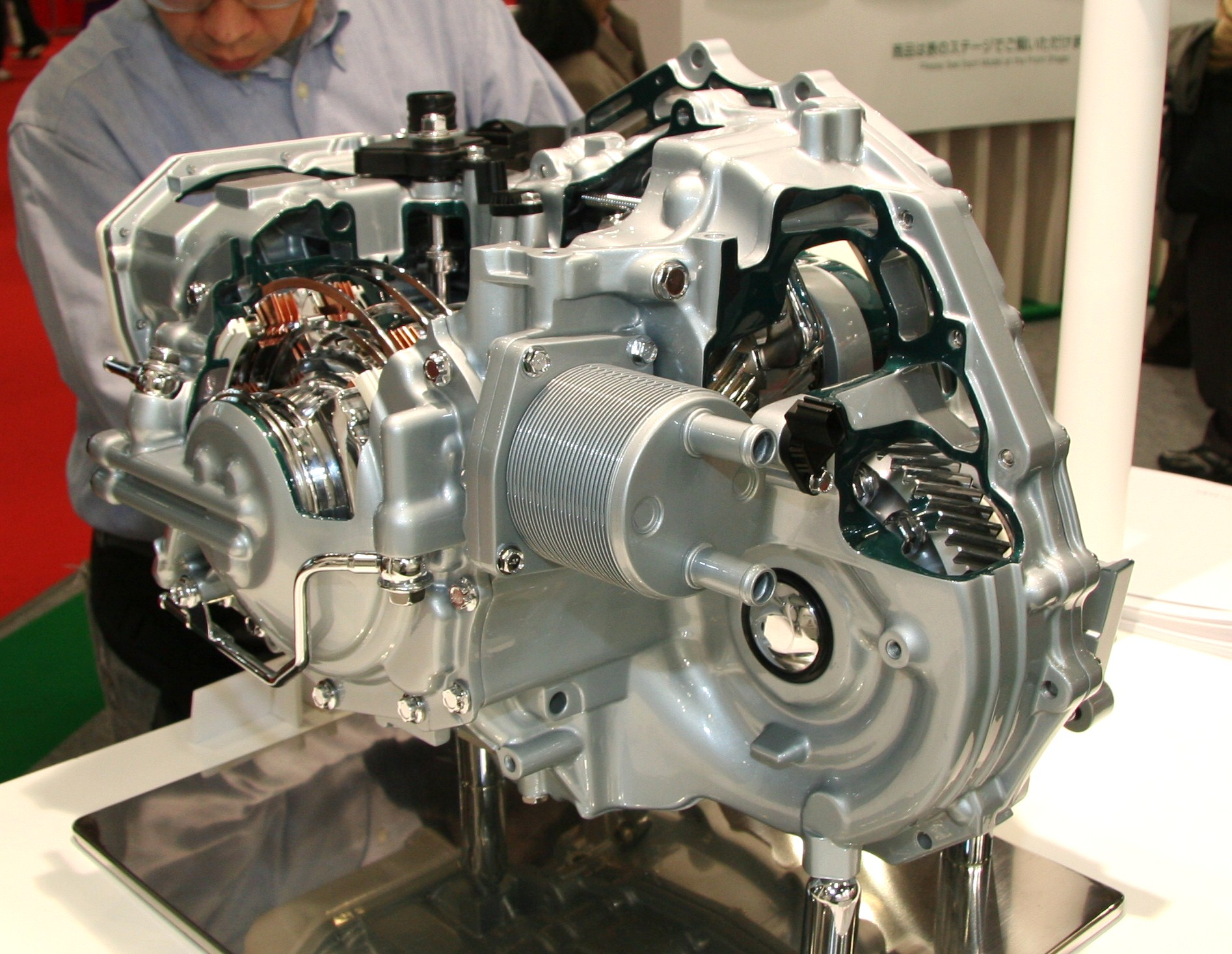
Jatco JF613E 6-speed automatic transmission as used in the Renault Laguna.

- 4-speed medium/large
  - Nissan Altima
  - Nissan Quest
  - Nissan X-Trail
  - Renault Samsung SM5
- 5-speed medium/large JF506E/F5A5
  - VW Golf
  - VW Sharan
  - MG Rover
  - Land Rover Freelander
  - Jaguar X-Type,
  - Ford Mondeo
  - Audi A3
  - Mazda MPV
  - Mitsubishi Lancer Evolution
- 4-speed small FWD JF414E
- 6-speed medium/large FWD JF613E
  - Renault Laguna
  - Renault Scénic
  - Nissan Qashqai
  - Mitsubishi Outlander

== Continuously variable transmissions ==
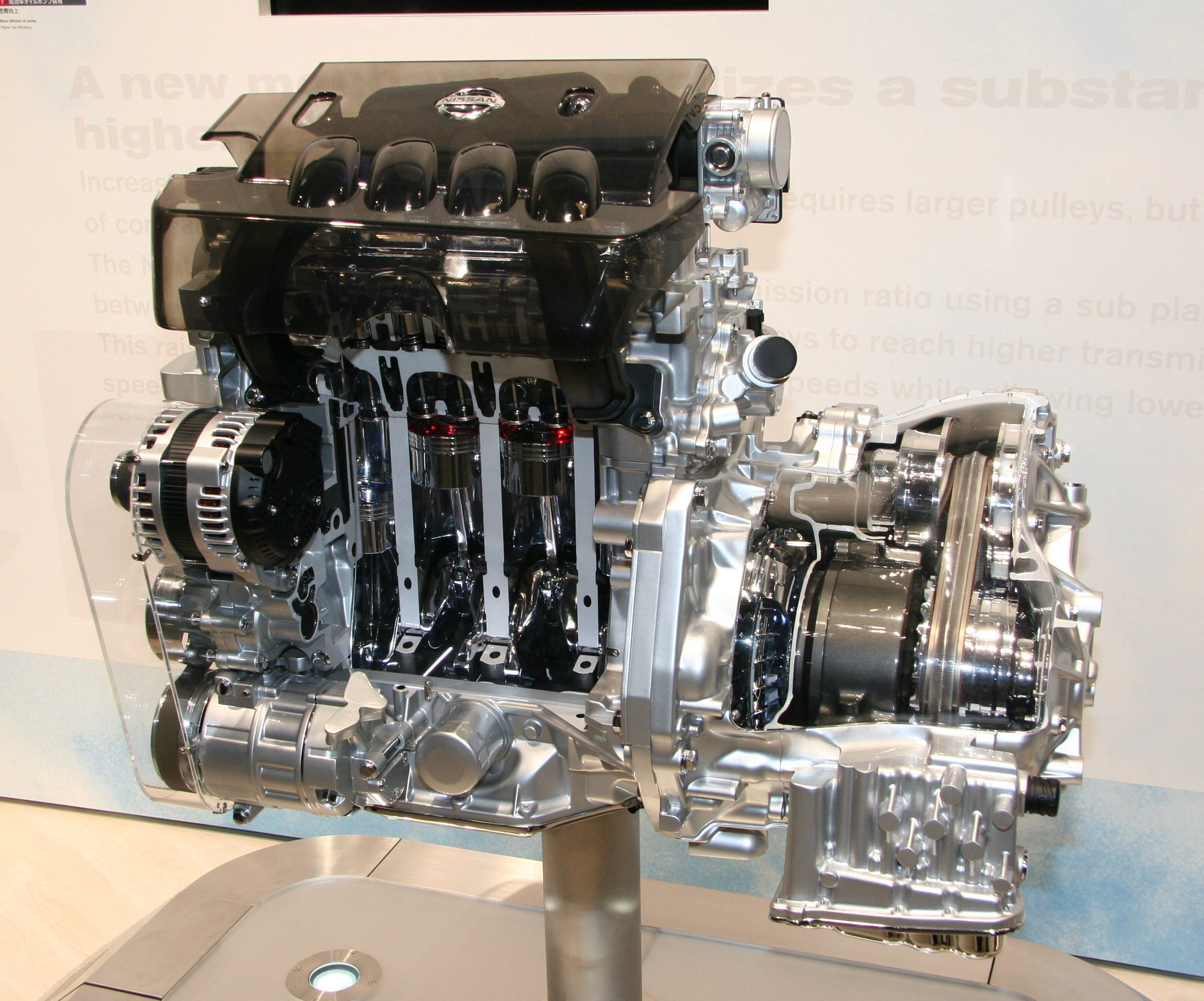
Jatco JF011E and Nissan MR20DE engine.

=== Front-wheel drive ===
- JF011E CVT2
  - Nissan Lafesta
  - Nissan Serena
  - Nissan Sentra
  - Renault Fluence
  - Nissan Bluebird Sylphy
  - Nissan X-Trail (T31)
  - Mitsubishi Outlander (2008–TBD)
  - Mitsubishi Lancer (2008–TBD)
  - Mitsubishi Outlander Sport (2011–TBD)
  - Dodge Caliber
  - Jeep Compass
  - Jeep Patriot
  - Suzuki Kizashi
  - Renault Koleos (2008–TBD)
- JF009E CVT1
  - Nissan Tiida (Versa)
  - Nissan Note
  - Nissan Cube
  - Nissan March
  - Nissan Wingroad
- Mitsubishi F1C1A
  - Mitsubishi Colt
  - Mitsubishi Colt Plus
  - Mitsubishi Lancer (non US market, pre-2008)
  - Hyundai Sonata (Korean domestic, 2001–2002)
- F06A
  - Nissan Primera
- JF010E CVT3
  - Nissan Teana
  - Nissan Presage
  - Nissan Murano
- CVT7
  - JF015E; ratio coverage 8.7
  - JF020E; ratio coverage 7.3
  - Mitsubishi Mirage
  - Mitsubishi Attrage
  - Mitsubishi Delica D:2
  - Nissan Cube
  - Nissan Juke
  - Nissan Latio
  - Nissan March
  - Nissan Note
  - Nissan Sylphy
  - Nissan Lannia
  - Suzuki Alto Eco
  - Suzuki Hustler
  - Suzuki Solio
  - Suzuki Spacia
  - Suzuki Splash
  - Suzuki Swift
  - Suzuki Wagon R
- CVT8
  - Jatco JF016E • JF017E (Hybrid) • JF018E • JF019E (Hybrid) • ratio coverage 6.3–7.0 • max torque between 250 and 380 N⋅m (184 and 280 lb⋅ft)
  - Infiniti QX60
  - Nissan NV200
  - Nissan Serena
  - Nissan Teana
  - Nissan X-Trail
  - Nissan Rogue (USA & Canada)
  - Mitsubishi Outlander
  - Mitsubishi Eclipse Cross
  - Mitsubishi Destinator
- CVT S
  - ratio coverage 6.0 for small engines below 1L
- CVT X
  - JF022E • ratio coverage 8.2 • max torque 330 N⋅m (243 lb⋅ft)
  - Nissan Qashqai 2021, X-trail 2021
  - Mitsubishi Outlander 2022
  - Renault Austral
- CVT XS
  - JF023E • ratio coverage 7.9 • max torque 280 N⋅m (207 lb⋅ft)
  - Nissan Sentra 2024 (PDF), Kicks 2024

=== Rear-wheel drive ===
- JR006E: Toroidal CVT • max torque 370 N⋅m (273 lb⋅ft)
  - Nissan Skyline 350GT-8 (2002–2006)

== Hybrid vehicle systems ==
- 7-speed JR712E • rear wheel drive • hybrid vehicle.
  - 3.5L V6 Engine Infiniti Q50
- CVT 8
  - Serena S Hybrid (Mild hybrid) 2013
- CVT 8 Hybrid
  - Nissan Pathfinder Hybrid 2014
  - Infiniti QX60 Hybrid 2014–2018
- CVT 8 Hybrid
  - Nissan X-Trail 2015

== See also ==
- Jatco
- Nissan
- Toyota
