= Jatco 4R03 transmission =

4-speed automatic transmission

The 4R03 was a 4-speed automatic transmission from Jatco, a former subsidiary of Nissan Motor Company, Ltd.

== Specifications ==
=== Gear ratios ===
1	2	3	4	R
2.784	1.544	1.000	0.694	2.2750

== Applications ==
- 1990–2001 Infiniti Q45
- 1989–1996 Nissan 300ZX Twin-Turbo
- 1995–1999 Nissan Cedric Y33
- Nissan Patrol (Y60) 1987–1997.
- Nissan Patrol (Y61) 1997–2010.
  - RD28ETi
  - TB45E
  - ZD30DDTi
- 1990–1995 Mazda Eunos Cosmo (With 20B-REW Engine, as the Mazda Q4A-EL)

== See also ==
- List of Jatco transmissions
