= Jatco 5R01 transmission =

World's first 5-speed automatic from 1989

The Jatco 5R01, also called RE5R01A (Nissan part) or JR502E/JR503E (Jatco part), is a 5-speed automatic transmission from Jatco and Nissan Motors for use in rear wheel drive vehicles with longitudinal engines. Introduced in 1989, it is the world's first 5-speed automatic transmission, and is full range electronically controlled.

== Applications ==
- Nissan Cedric
- Nissan Gloria
- Nissan Cefiro
- Nissan Skyline
- Nissan Laurel
- BMW 5 Series (E39) Japanese and South African models (only pre-facelift)
- BMW 3 Series (E36) Japanese and South African models
- BMW 5 Series (E34) Japanese and South African models

== See also ==
- List of Jatco Transmissions
