= Suzuki MR Wagon =

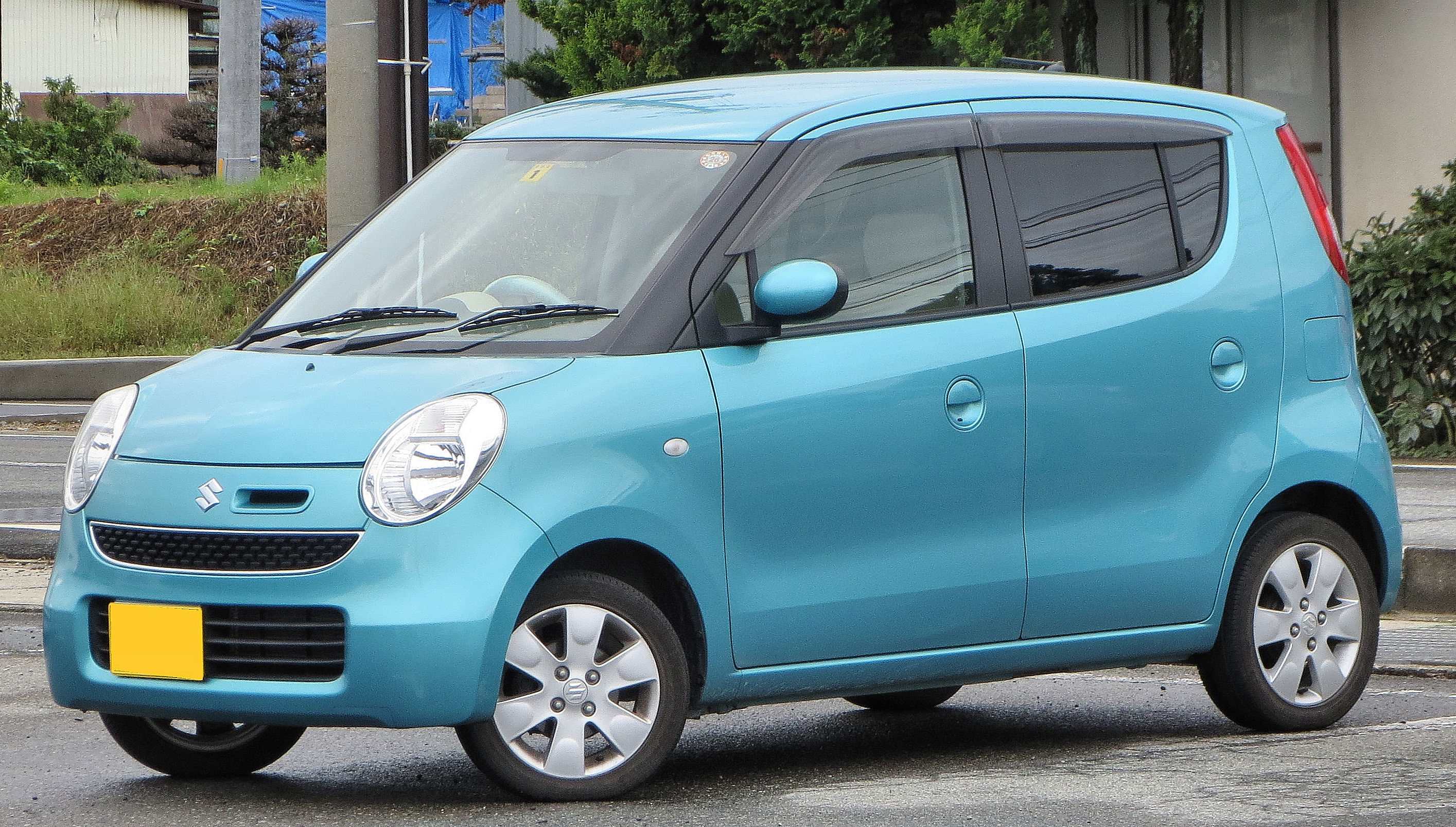
- Suzuki MR Wagon T (MF22S)

Overview
- Manufacturer: Suzuki
- Also called: Nissan Moco; Maruti Estilo/Zen Estilo (India, 2006–2012); Suzuki Karimun Estilo (Indonesia, 2007–2013)
- Production: 2001–2016

Body and chassis
- Class: Kei car City car
- Body style: 5-door hatchback
- Layout: Front-engine, front-wheel-drive Front-engine, four-wheel-drive (Japan)
- Related: Suzuki Alto; Suzuki Wagon R

The Suzuki MR Wagon is a 4-seater kei car manufactured by Suzuki for the Japanese market only, and also marketed in Japan by Nissan as the Nissan Moco under an OEM agreement. The model debuted in 2001, and since 2011 it has been in its third generation. The first generation was also produced and sold in India by Maruti Suzuki as Maruti Suzuki Zen Estilo, which was launched in 2006. This was renamed the Maruti Suzuki Estilo in 2009.

The vehicle's name is somewhat misleading, as it does not sport a mid-engine, rear-wheel-drive layout (which is often abbreviated as MR); it stands for "Magical Relax".

== First generation (MF21S; 2001) ==
First generation (MF21S/MF31S)
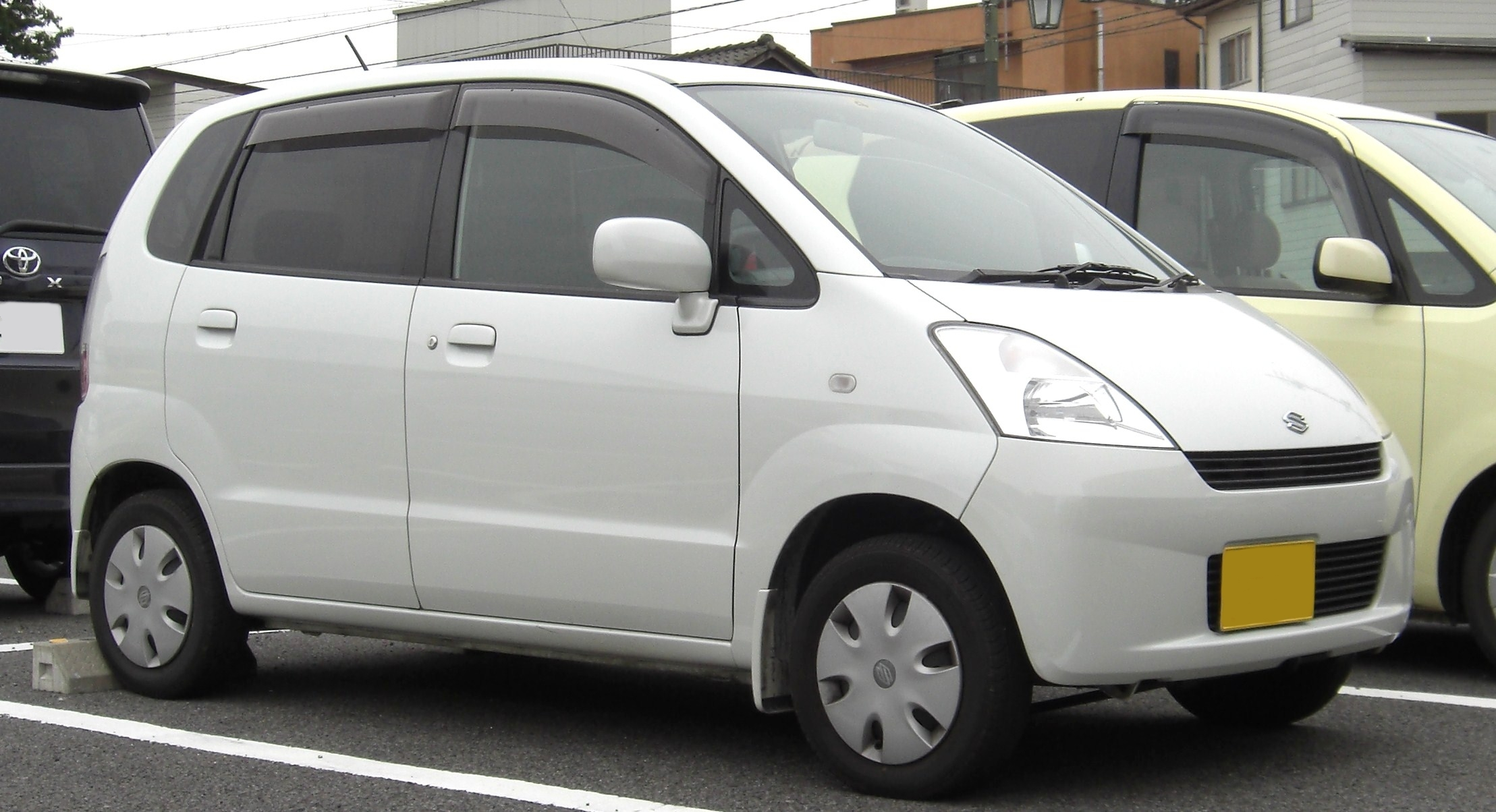
- MR Wagon (pre-facelift)

Overview
- Also called: Maruti Estilo/Zen Estilo (India, 2006–2012); Suzuki Karimun Estilo (Indonesia, 2006–2012); Nissan Moco
- Production: 2001–2006 (Japan); 2006–2012 (India & Indonesia)
- Assembly: Japan: Kosai, Shizuoka; India: Gurgaon (Maruti Suzuki)

Body and chassis
- Class: Kei car (Japan); City car (India and Indonesia)
- Body style: 5-door hatchback

Powertrain
- Engine: 658 cc K6A DOHC I3; 658 cc K6A turbo DOHC I3; 998 cc K10B DOHC I3 (India and Indonesia); 1061 cc F10D I4 (India and Indonesia)
- Transmission: 5-speed manual 4-speed automatic

Dimensions
- Wheelbase: 2,360 mm (92.9 in)
- Length: 3,395 mm (133.7 in); 3,600 mm (141.7 in) (Estilo/Karimun)
- Width: 1,475 mm (58.1 in)
- Height: 1,590–1,600 mm (62.6–63.0 in)
- Curb weight: 840–900 kg (1,851.9–1,984.2 lb)

Chronology
- Predecessor: Maruti Suzuki Zen (India); Suzuki Karimun (Indonesia)
- Successor: Suzuki Celerio (India); Suzuki Karimun Wagon R (Indonesia)

After appearing at the 33rd Tokyo Motor Show in 1999, the first generation model went on sale on December 4, 2001, featuring Suzuki's K6A kei car engine, in either naturally aspirated (54 PS [40 kW]) or turbocharged (60 PS [44 kW]) versions, available with either front-wheel drive or all-wheel drive. Torque figures are 61 and 84 N⋅m (45 and 62 lb⋅ft) respectively. In all versions, the transmission was a four-speed transmission with column shift. A hydrogen-powered fuel cell vehicle based on the first-generation MR Wagon was presented in 2005, using technology co-developed with General Motors.

Later turbocharged versions develop the maximum 64 PS (47 kW) allowed by kei car regulations, and have 103 N⋅m (76 lb⋅ft) of torque. In April 2005, the sporty MR Wagon A-Limited special edition was presented. This had a lower ride height, 14-inch alloy wheels, and a more aggressive front bumper with a spoiler and integrated foglights as well as side skirts and a rear spoiler. The interior was also updated, with black seat with contrasting upholstery inserts, also fitted to the door panels. Production ended a few months later, in December 2005, with sales of the regular model running out in January. The slower selling MR Wagon Sports series continued to be available from existing stock until June 2006.

The Nissan Moco version was presented as a concept car on the 35th Tokyo Motor Show in October 2001 and then went on sale on April 10, 2002. The basic engine, drive and transmission choices were the same as for the Suzuki. The major difference between the Nissan and Suzuki versions was the Nissan's "wing" grille resembling that of the contemporary P12 Primera. The sales of the Nissan version stabilized at about 3,000-4,000 units a month, actually exceeding the MR Wagon's sales.

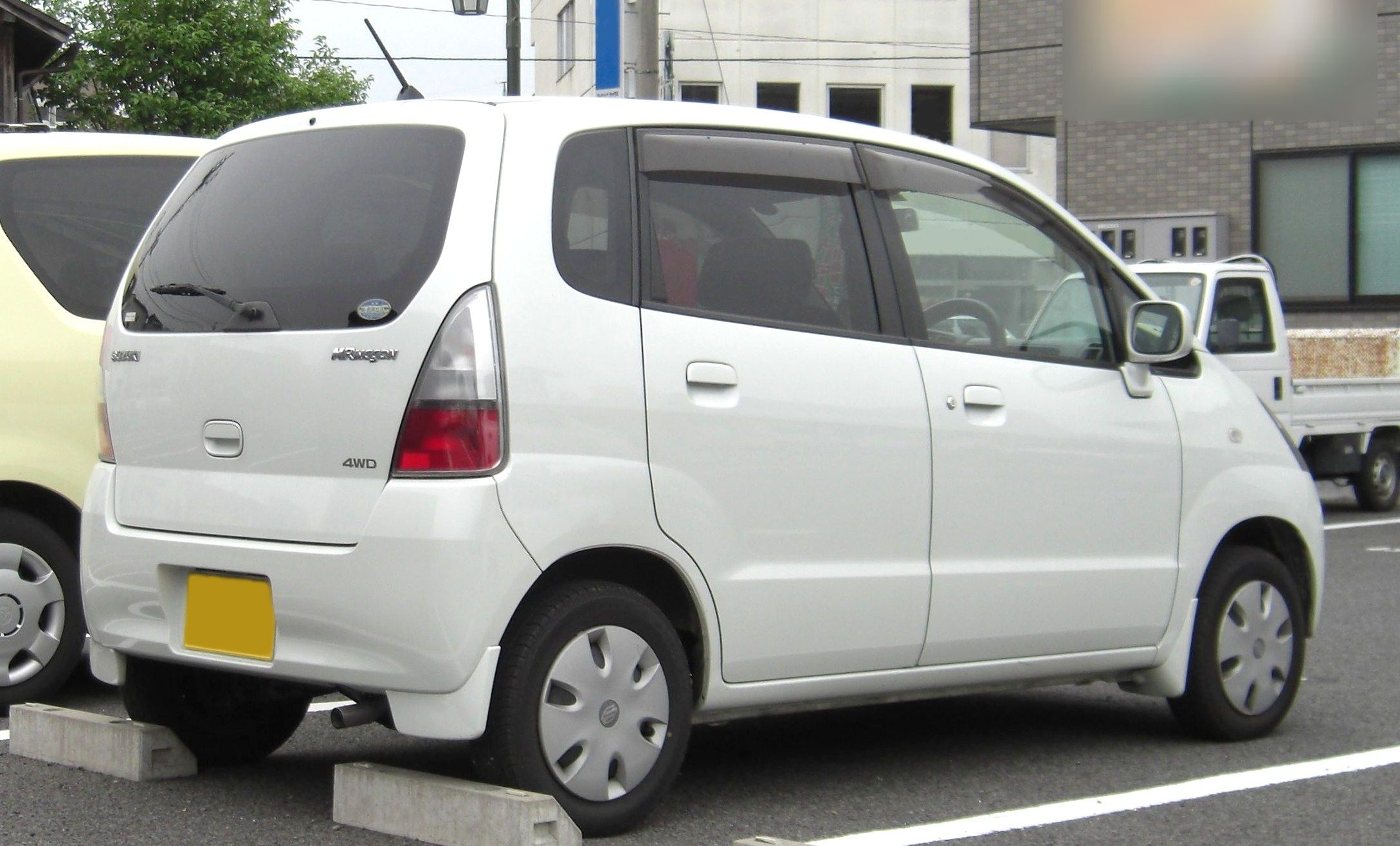
MR Wagon (pre-facelift)

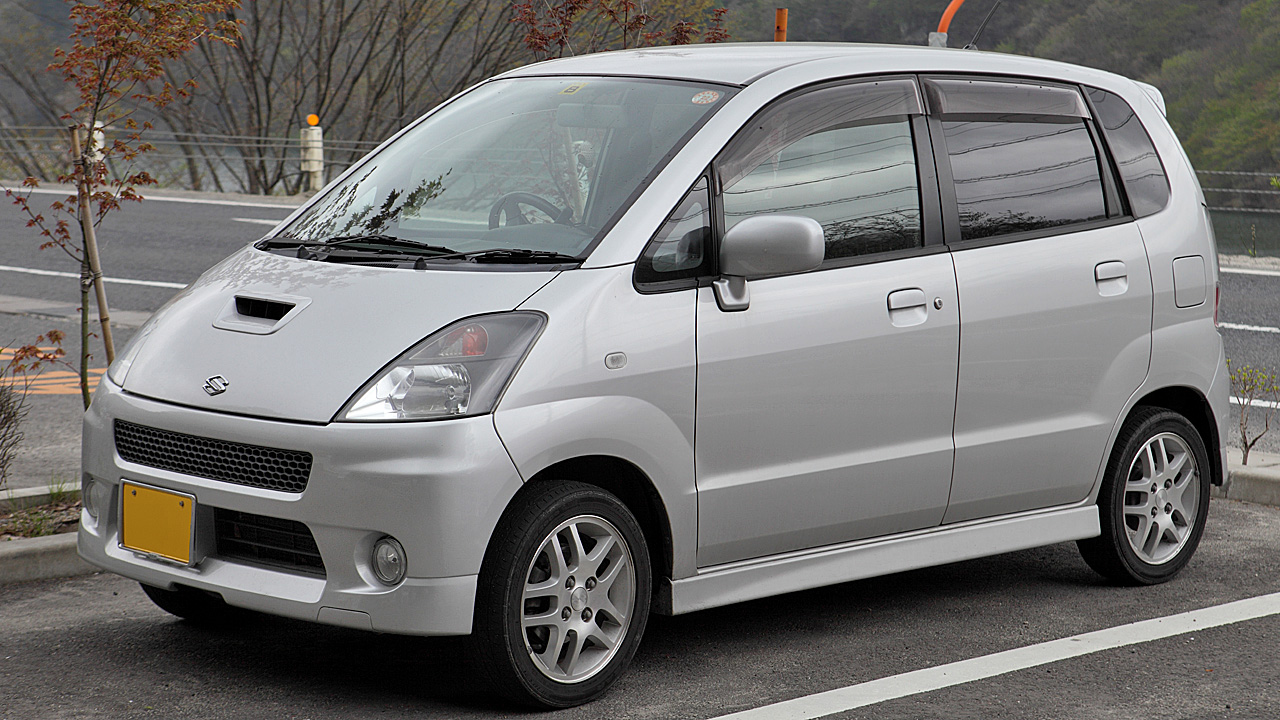
MR Wagon Sport (pre-facelift)

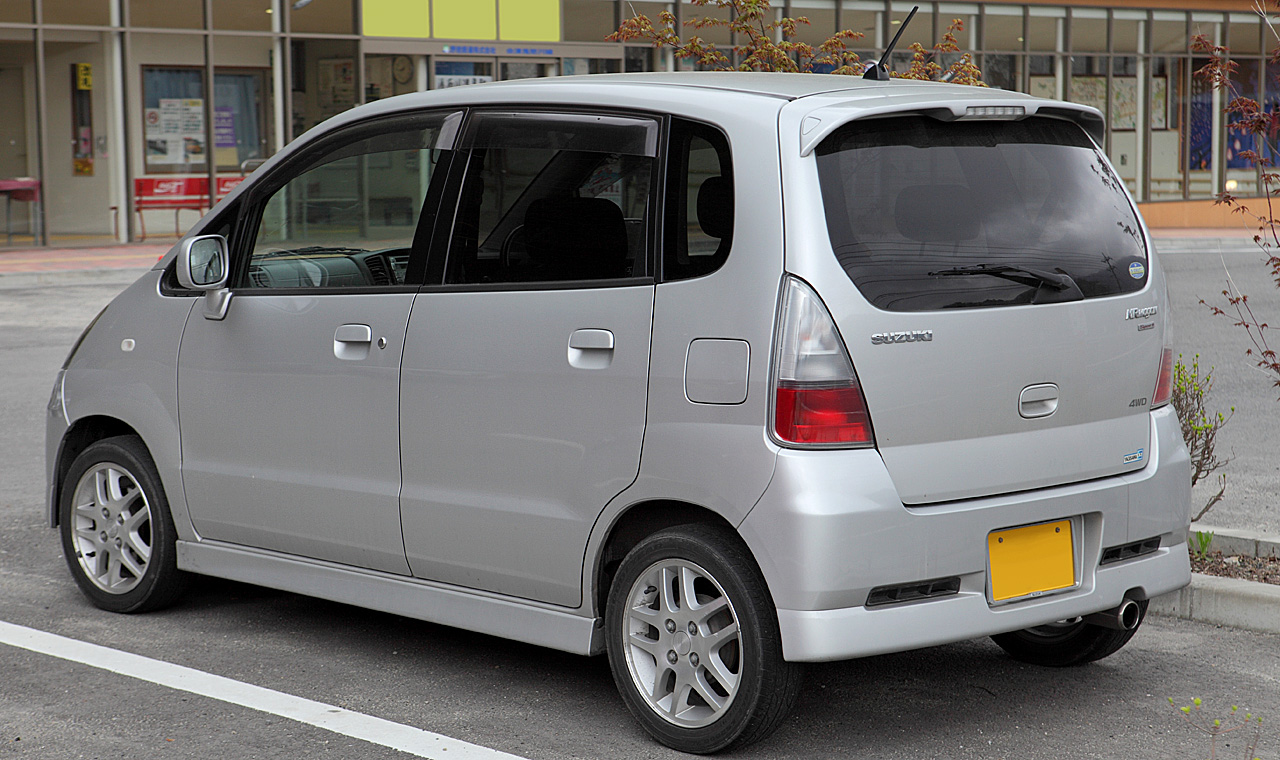
MR Wagon Sport (pre-facelift)

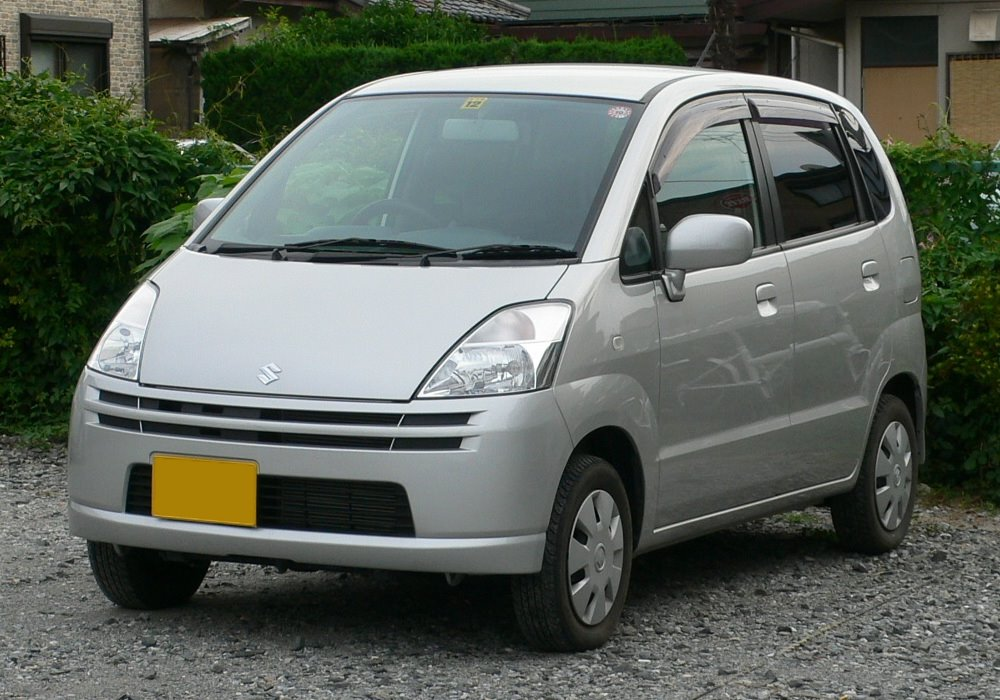
MR Wagon (facelift)

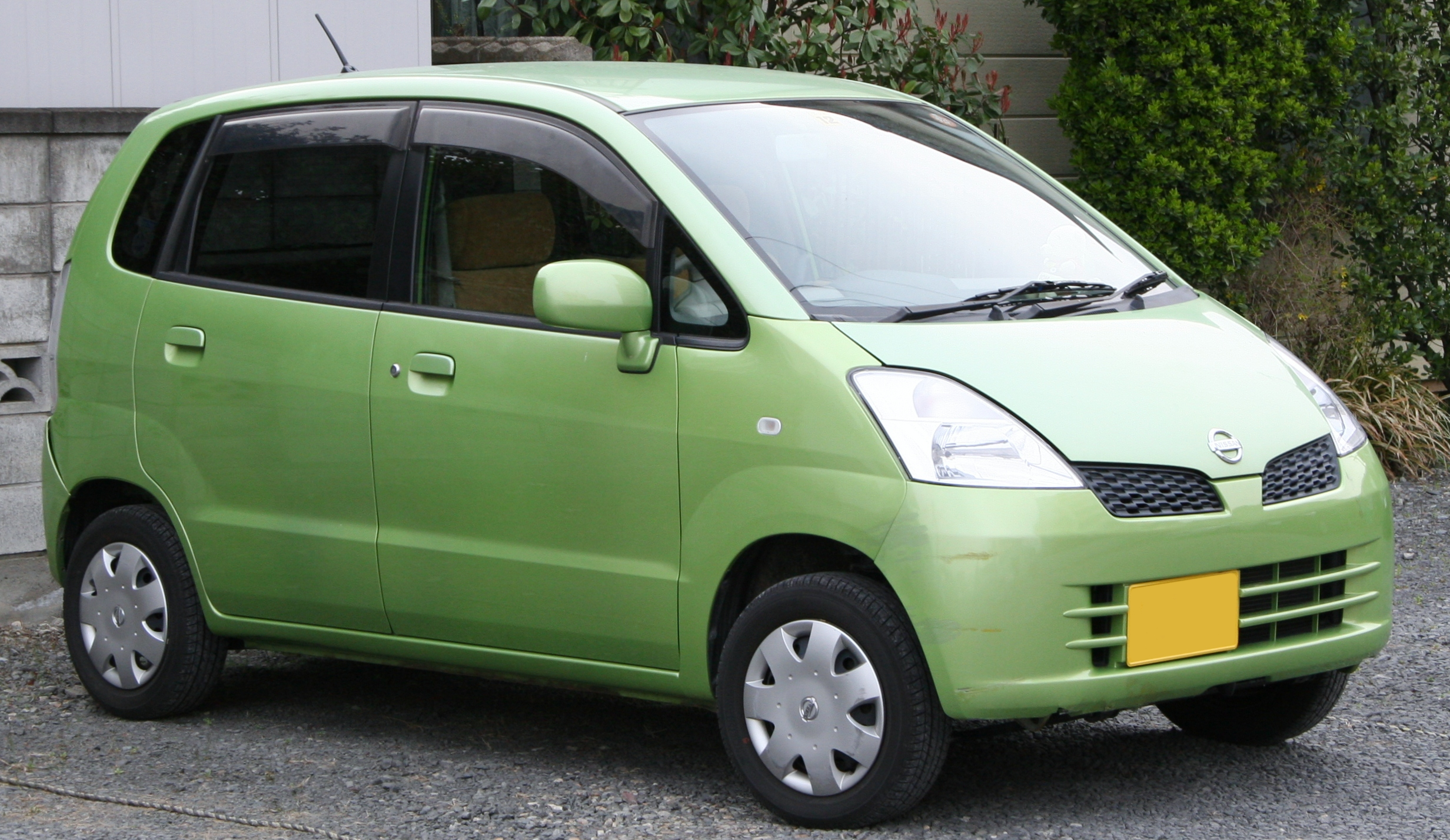
Nissan Moco

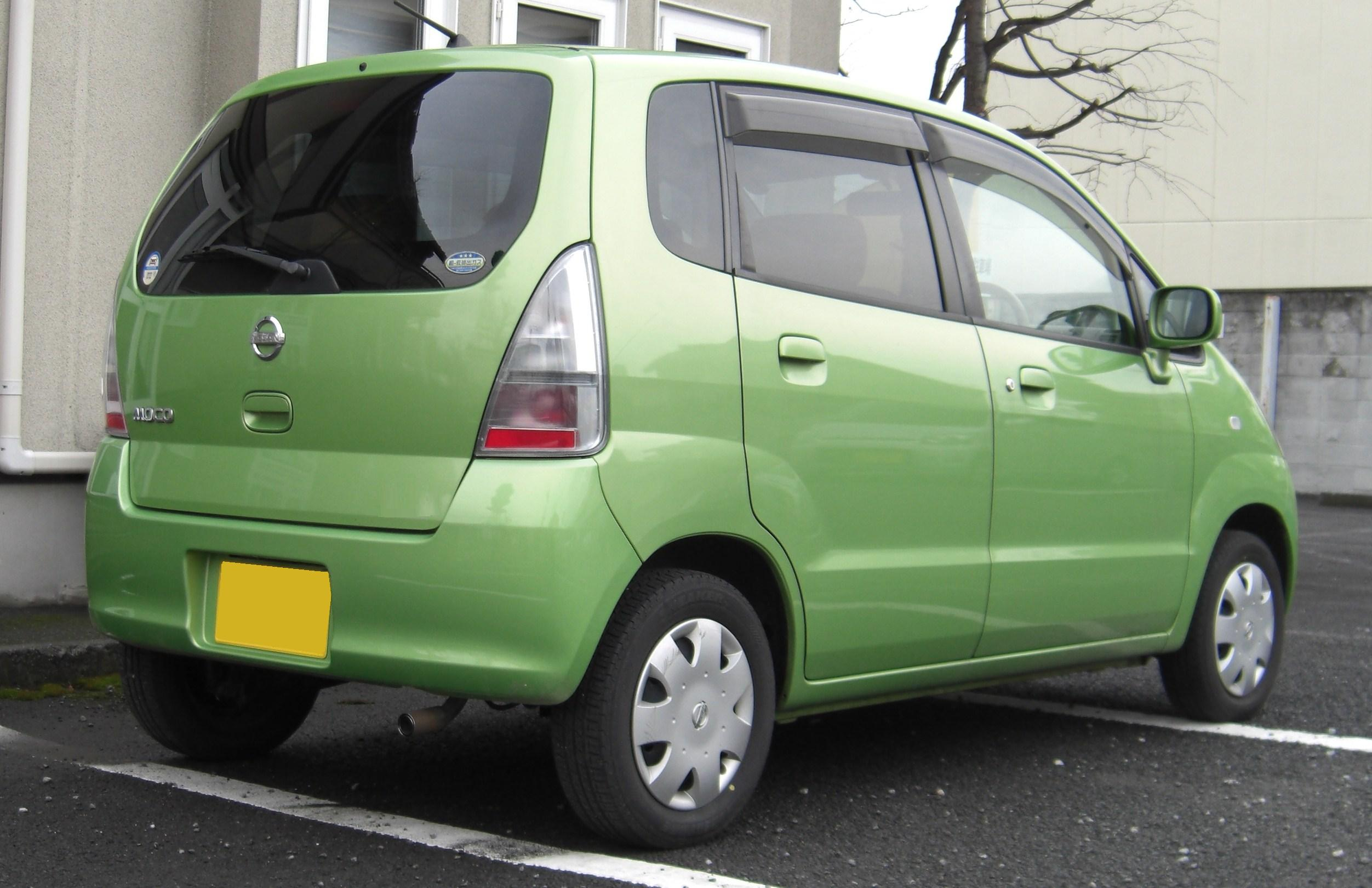
Nissan Moco

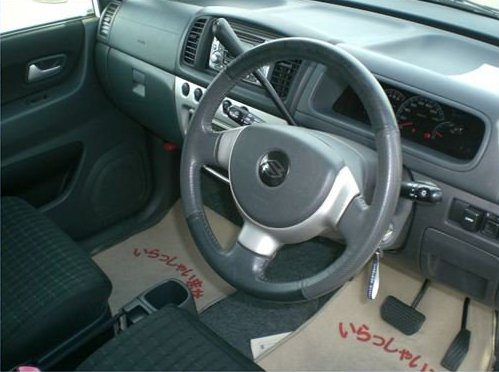
MR Wagon interior

=== Indian market (MF31S) ===
The first generation model went on sale in India in December 2006 as the Maruti Suzuki Zen Estilo, supposedly to increase differentiation from the Maruti Suzuki Alto. The Zen Estilo was powered by the larger F10D 1.1-litre four-cylinder 16-valve single overhead camshaft MPFI engine with 64 PS (47 kW) and 85 N⋅m (63 lb⋅ft) that also powers the Wagon R in the Indian market.

==== 2009 facelift ====
A facelifted variant was released in August 2009 as the Maruti Suzuki Estilo, losing the Zen moniker entirely. This transition has brought about a steady decline in sales, though the facelift brought significant improvements in performance and styling over the car's Japanese variants. The facelifted model featured refreshed styling and the Suzuki K10B 1.0-litre three-cylinder (12-valve) MPFI engine, producing a maximum power output of 68 PS (50 kW) at 6200 rpm and 92 N⋅m (68 lb⋅ft) of torque at 3500 rpm. This model also sported a slightly stiffer rear three-link suspension setup in an effort to curb body roll and improve stability at high speed. Features such as rear fog light, rear defroster, new instrument console and new interior colors were also added to enhance appeal.

In February 2014, the Estilo was discontinued in order to make room for the Celerio hatchback.

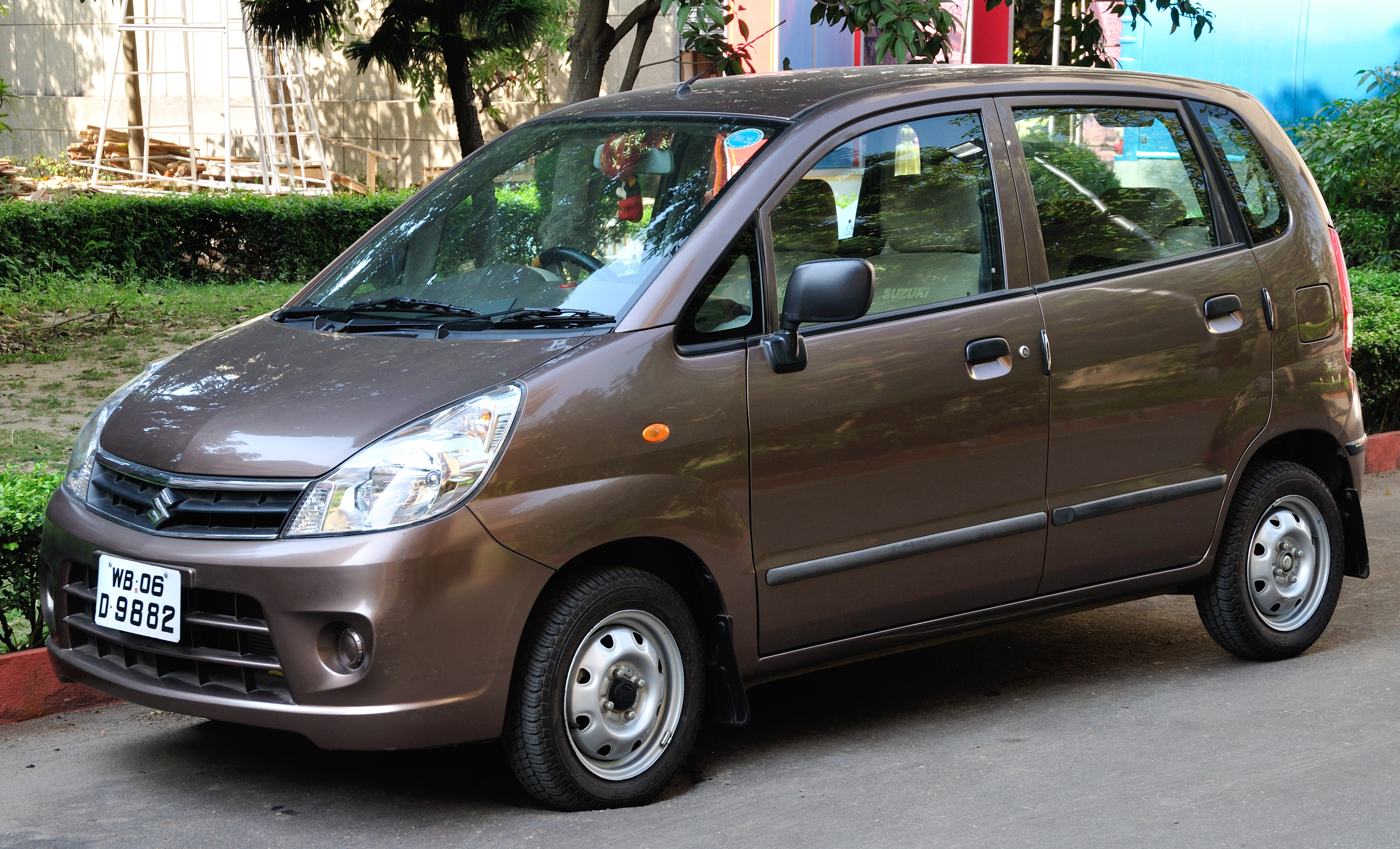
Maruti Suzuki Estilo LXi (facelift)

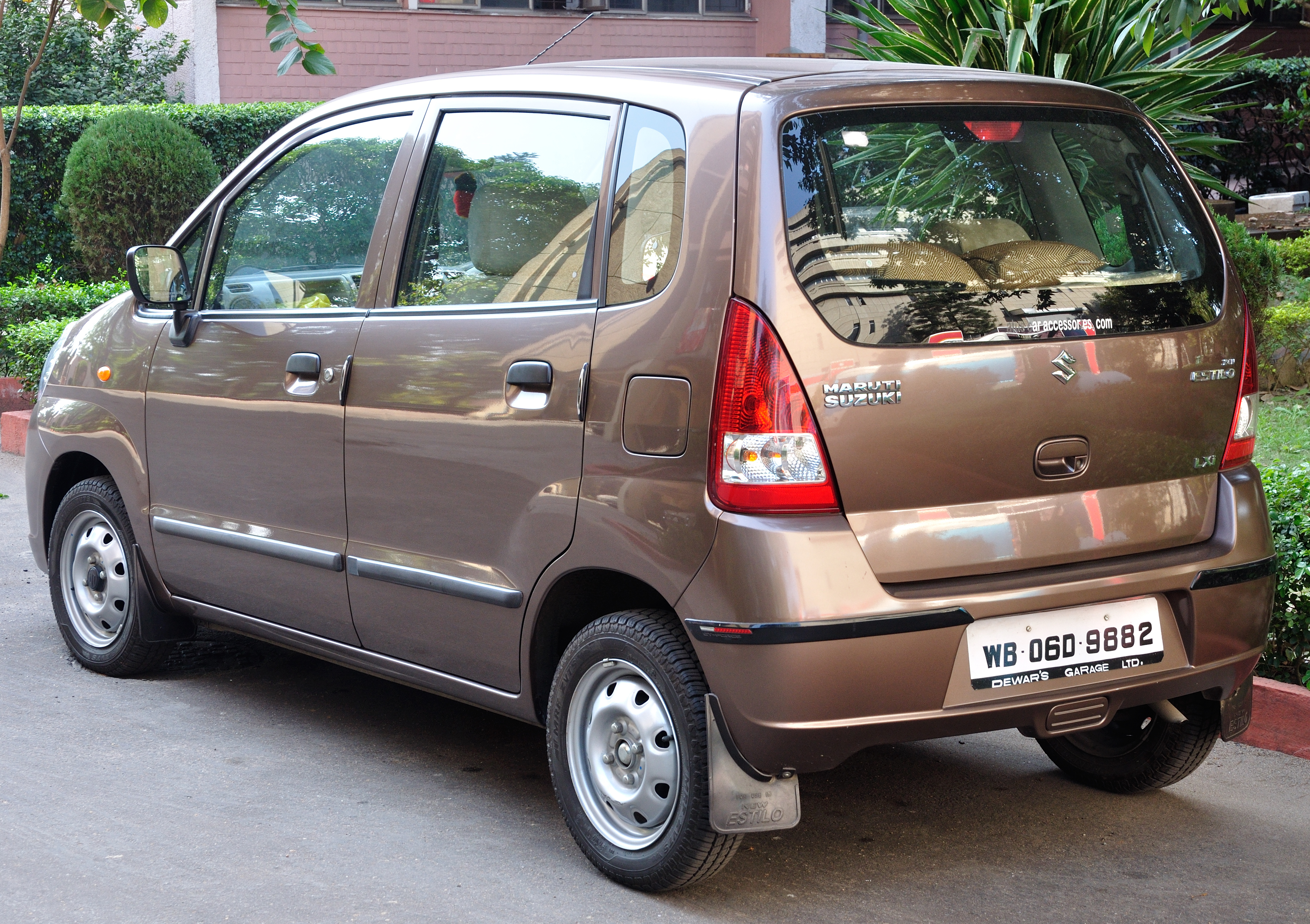
Maruti Suzuki Estilo LXi (facelift)

=== Indonesian market ===
The first generation model, sold in Indonesia as the Suzuki Karimun Estilo, replaced the first-generation Wagon R-based Suzuki Karimun. Sales began in 2007 with the units imported from Maruti Suzuki India. A facelifted variant was released in late 2009. Sales of the Karimun Estilo were discontinued in late 2012. In October 2013, the Karimun Wagon R replaced the Karimun Estilo.

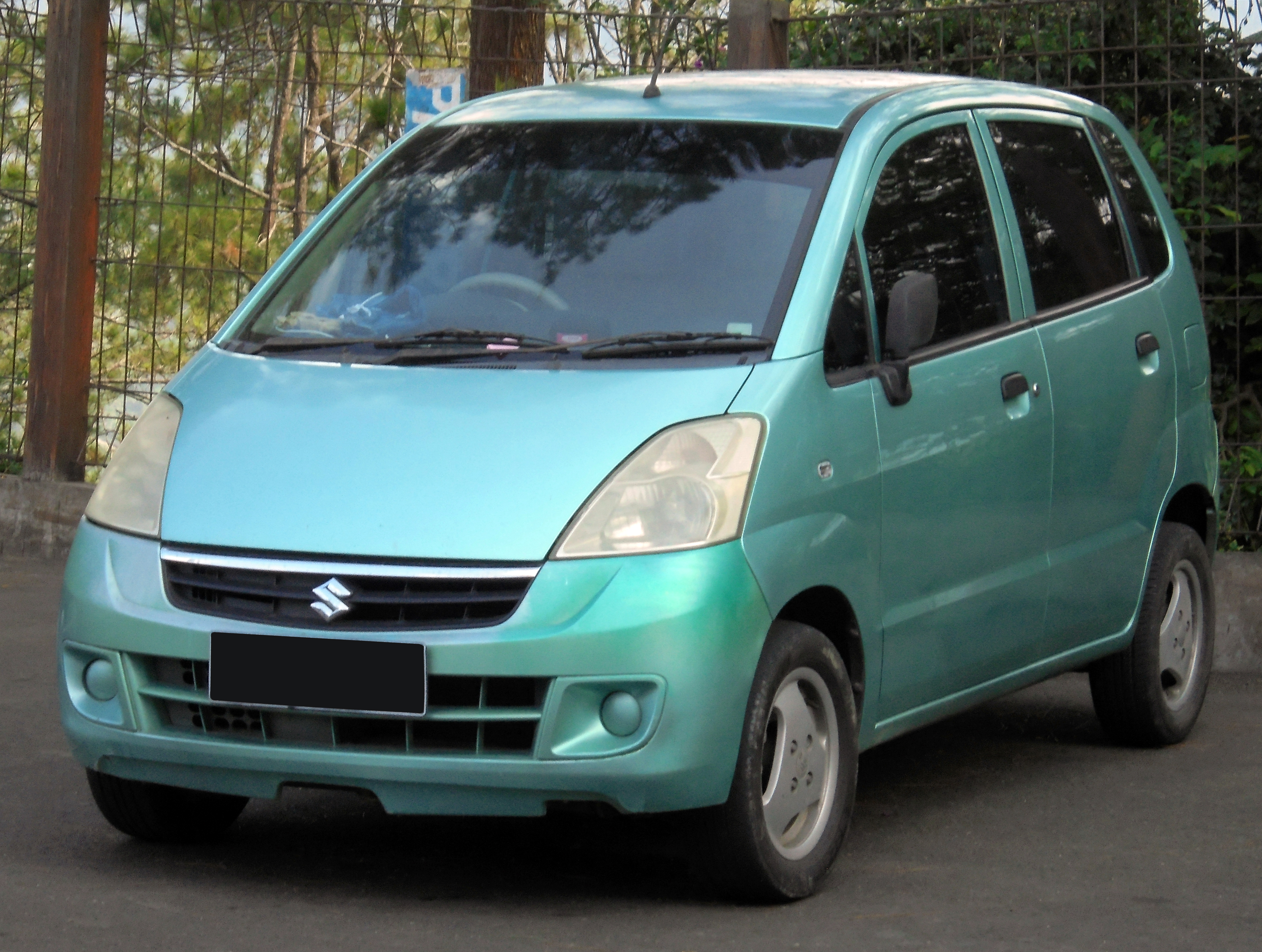
Suzuki Karimun Estilo (MF31S; pre-facelift)

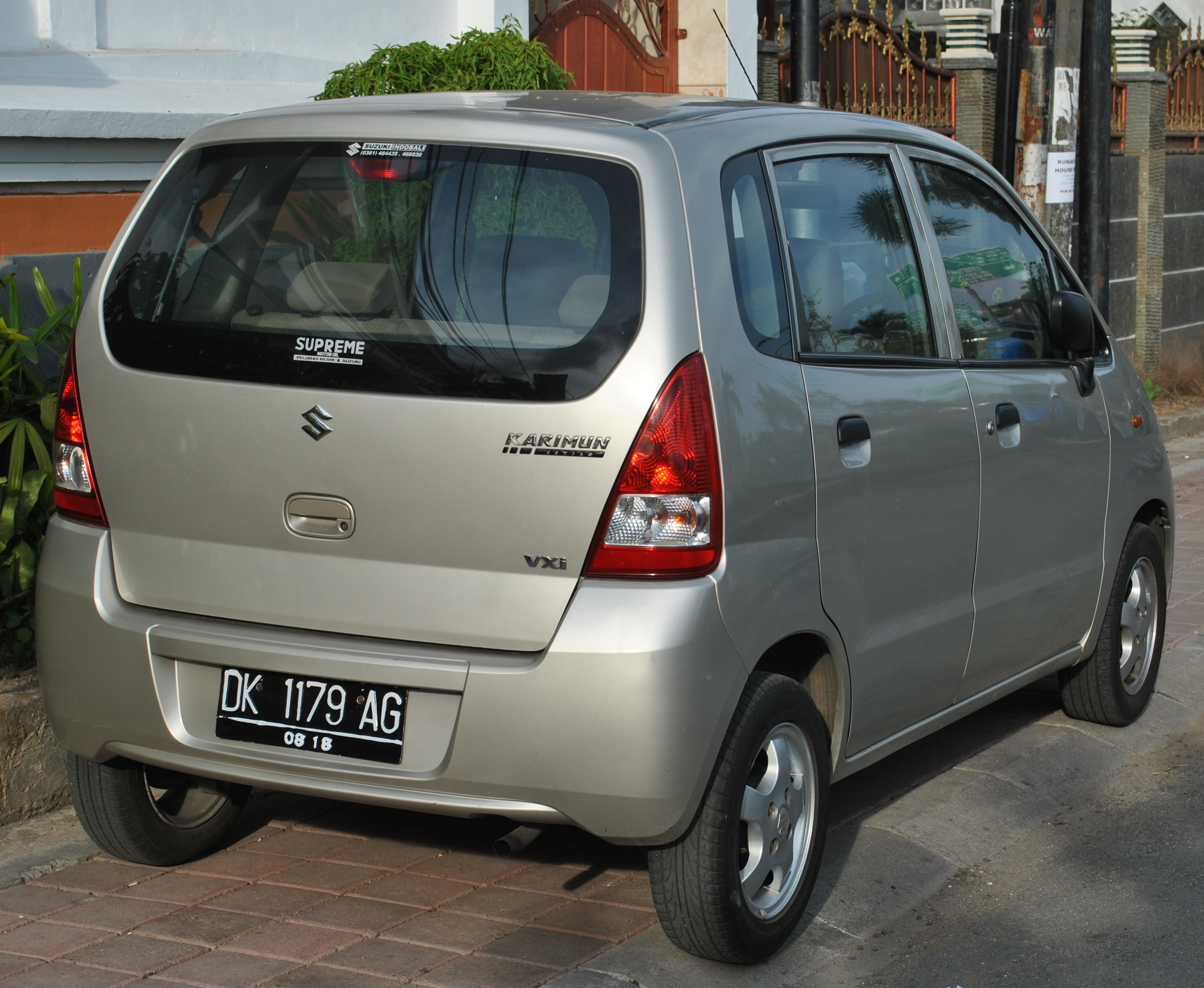
Suzuki Karimun Estilo (MF31S; pre-facelift)

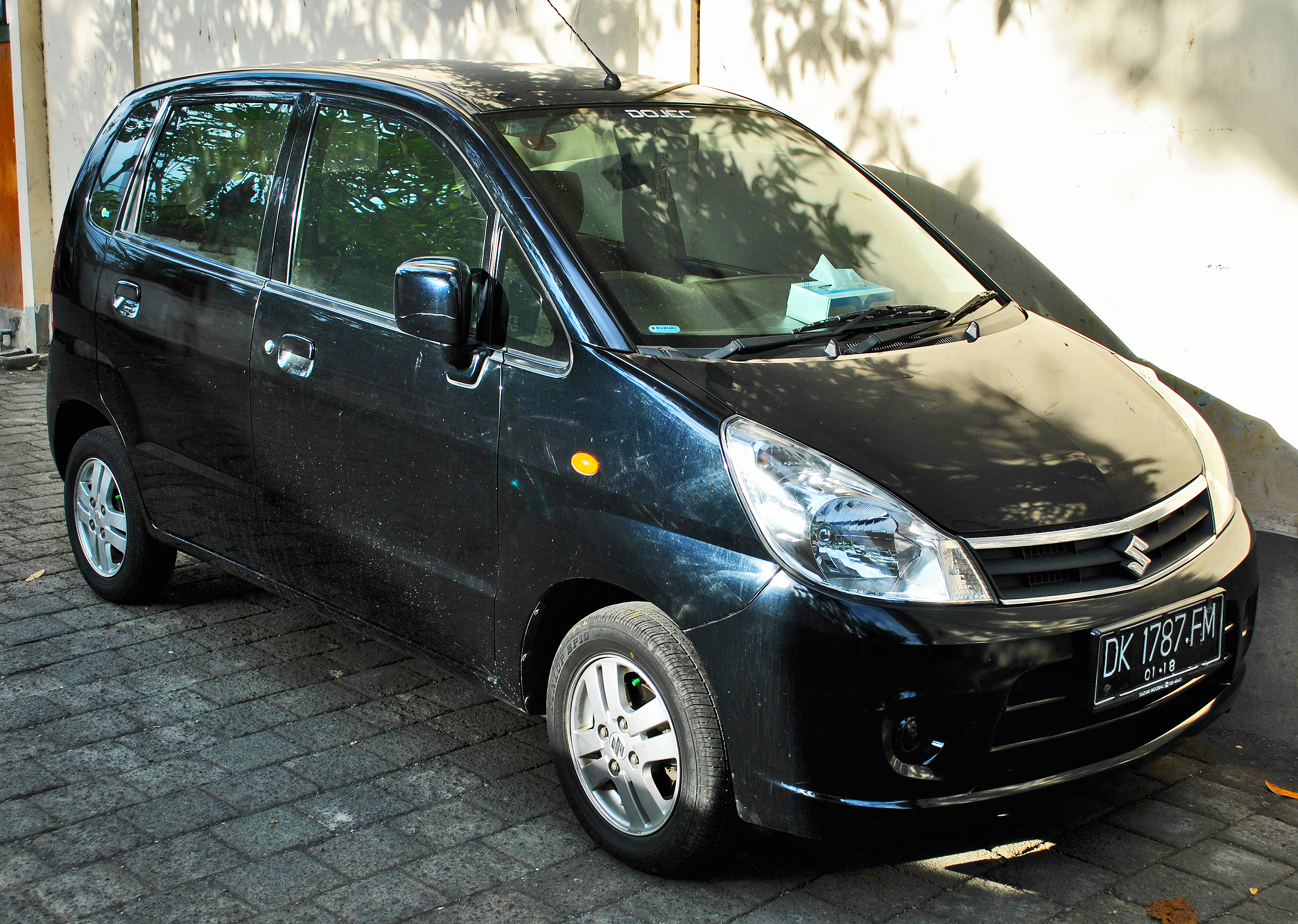
Suzuki Karimun Estilo (MF31S; facelift)

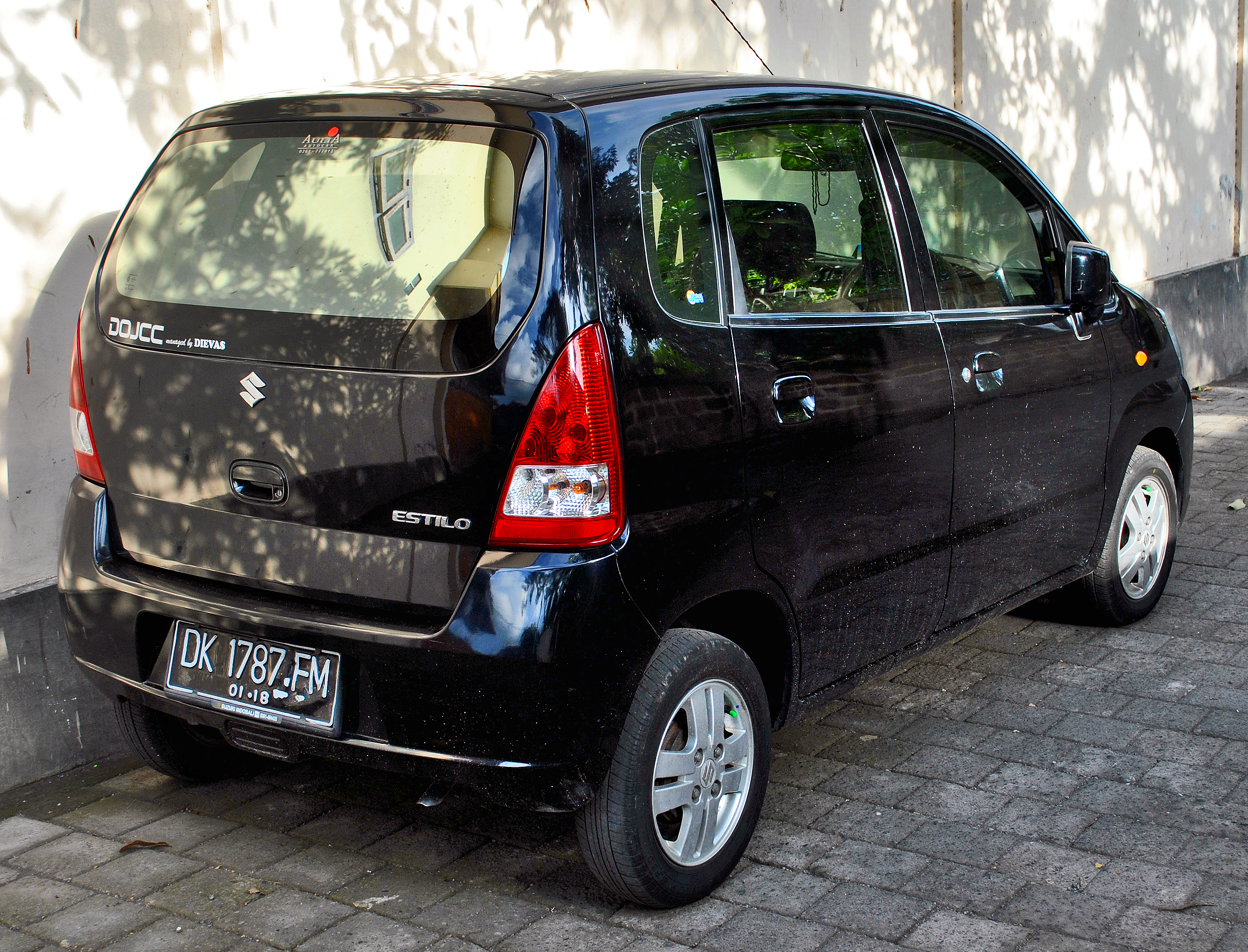
Suzuki Karimun Estilo (MF31S; facelift)

== Second generation (MF22S; 2006) ==
Second generation (MF22S)
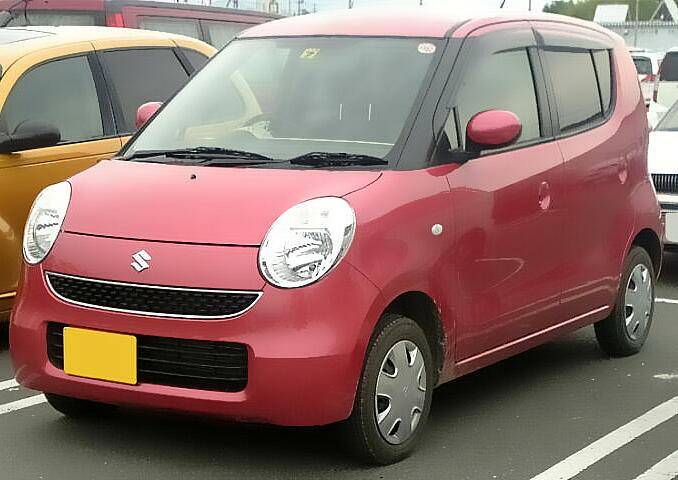
- MR Wagon (pre-facelift)

Overview
- Also called: Nissan Moco
- Production: 2006–2011
- Assembly: Japan: Kosai, Shizuoka

Powertrain
- Engine: 658 cc K6A DOHC I3; 658 cc K6A turbo DOHC I3
- Transmission: 4-speed automatic console shift

Dimensions
- Wheelbase: 2,360 mm (92.9 in)
- Length: 3,395 mm (133.7 in)
- Width: 1,475 mm (58.1 in)
- Height: 1,600–1,620 mm (63.0–63.8 in)
- Curb weight: 820 to 900 kg (1,810 to 1,980 lb)

The model's second generation was previewed at the 39th Tokyo Motor Show in 2005, where a concept called Mom's Personal Wagon was presented, with many features intended to be useful for a mother driving her children, including food trays, a front bench seat and pillarless suicide doors on the left side (which is the curb side in Japan). Most of those did not make it to the production version, which went on sale on January 20 (Moco on February 1) the following year, but the idea of being convenient for a mother with small children did inform the design. The designers studied 4-year-old children getting in and out of cars, which influenced the design of the rear seat and doors - the car featured a step next to the rear seat and a wide arm rest (to help children get in an out), and also has an upright C-pillar and a door which opens to 80 degrees rather than the 66 degrees of the previous generation (to allow better access to the child). Ample storage opportunities were provided throughout the cabin, which also featured a new keyless entry and start system.

The engine, drive and shifter choice remained the same as for the first generation, with the same availability in both Nissan and Suzuki versions, but the gear shifter was now located on the instrument panel. As with the first generation, the MR Wagon and the Moco are almost identical in outside appearance, but have different front end designs.

This generation of the MR Wagon has the MF22S chassis code (same code for front-wheel drive and four-wheel drive versions); the engines remained the familiar K6A family units. This generation was not built nor marketed outside of Japan.

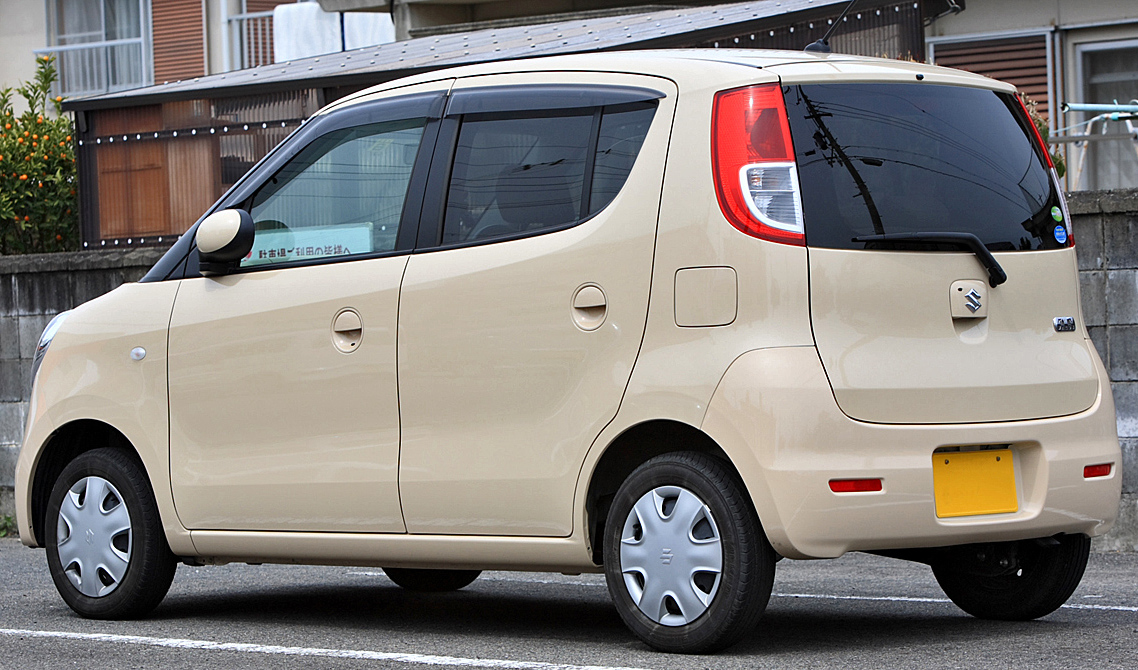
MR Wagon (pre-facelift)

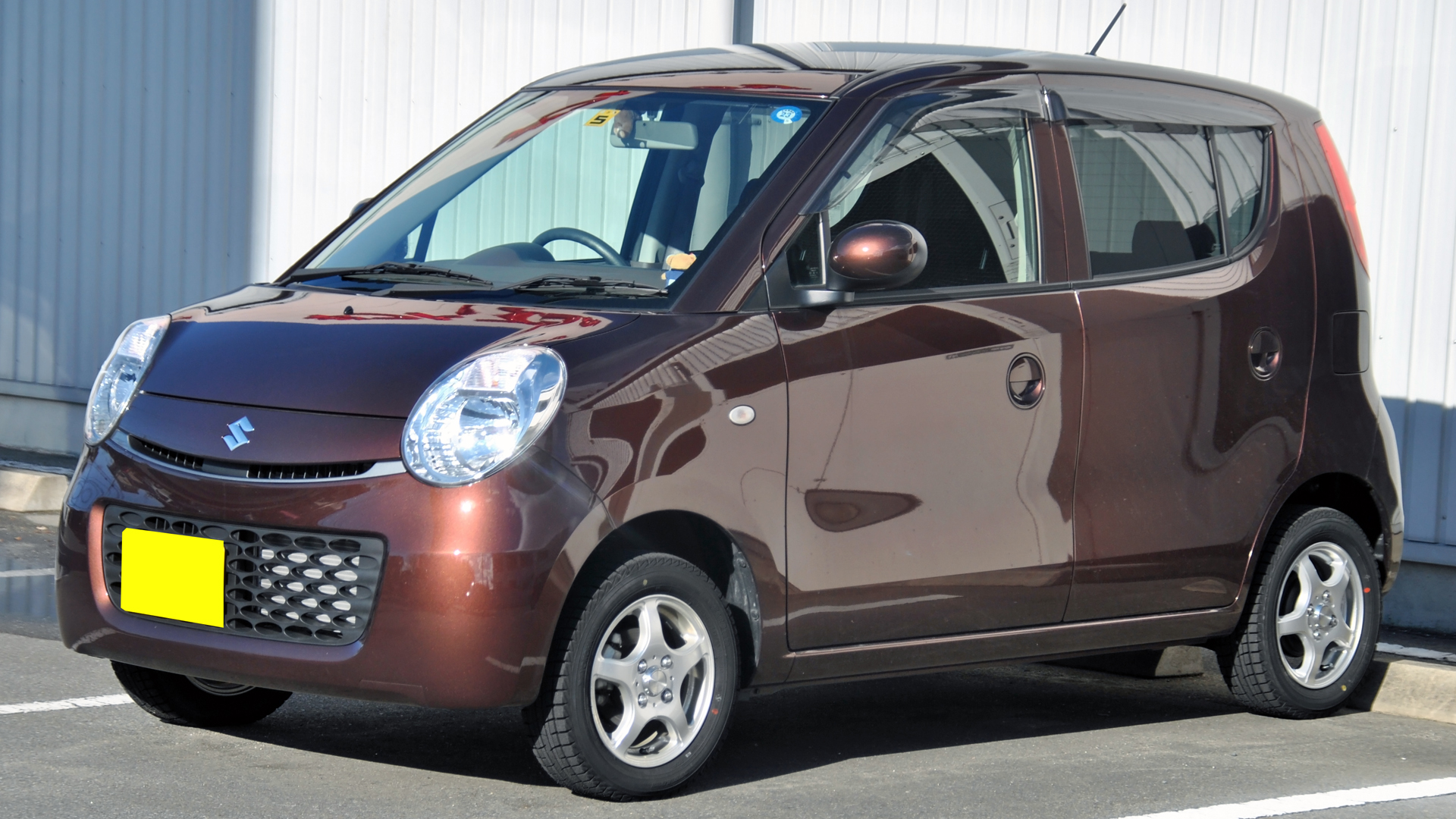
MR Wagon (facelift)

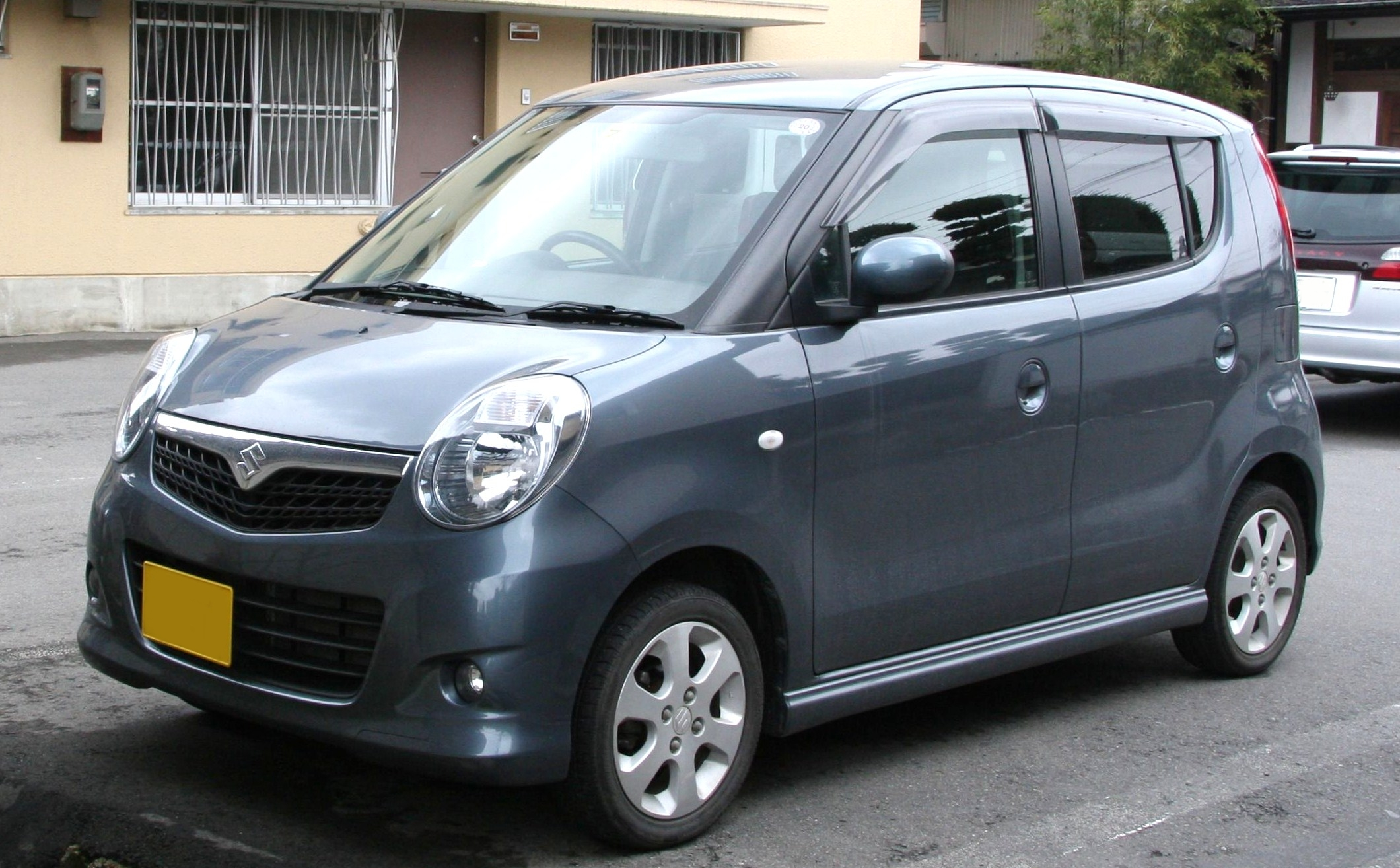
MR Wagon Wit (pre-facelift)

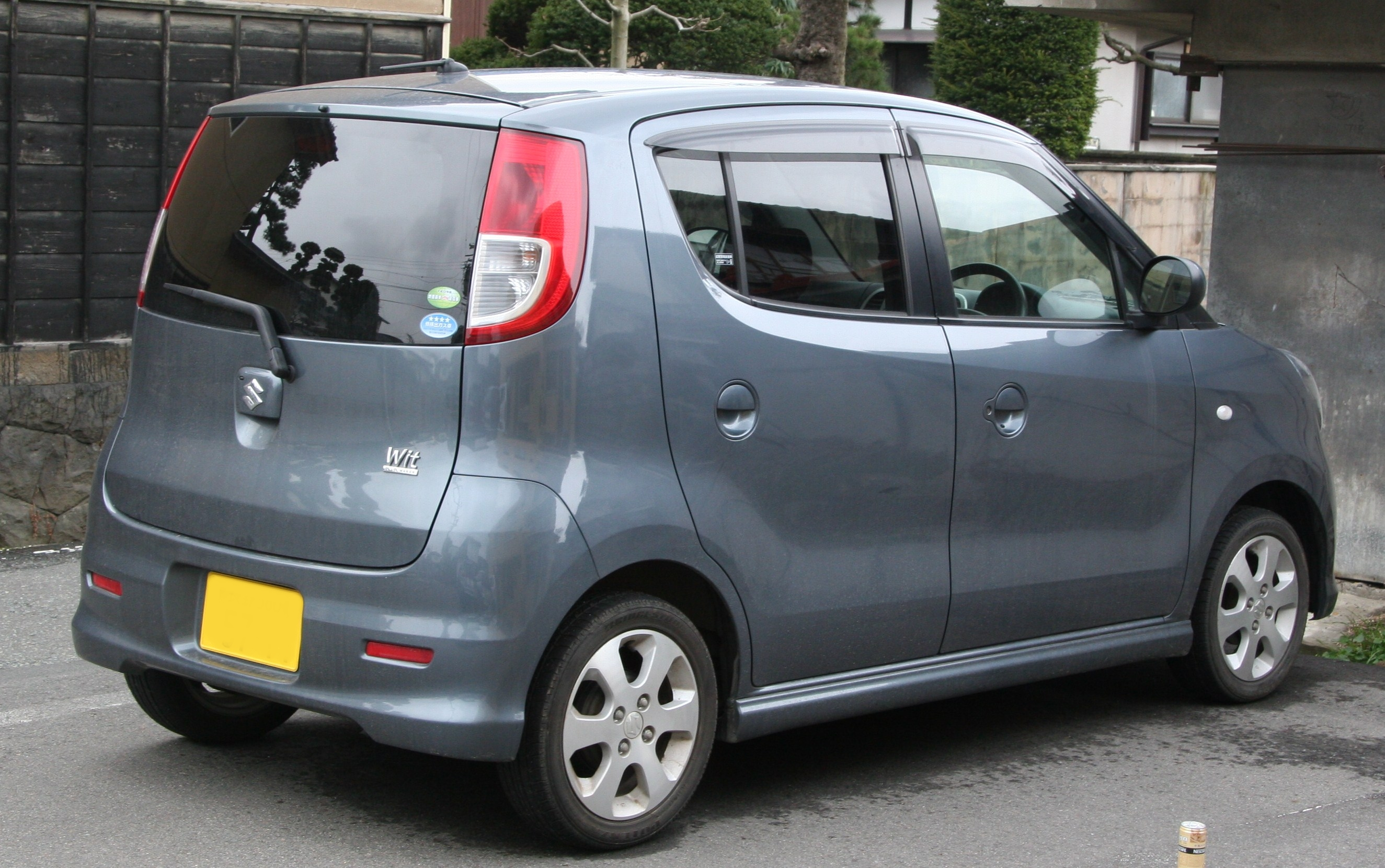
MR Wagon Wit (pre-facelift)

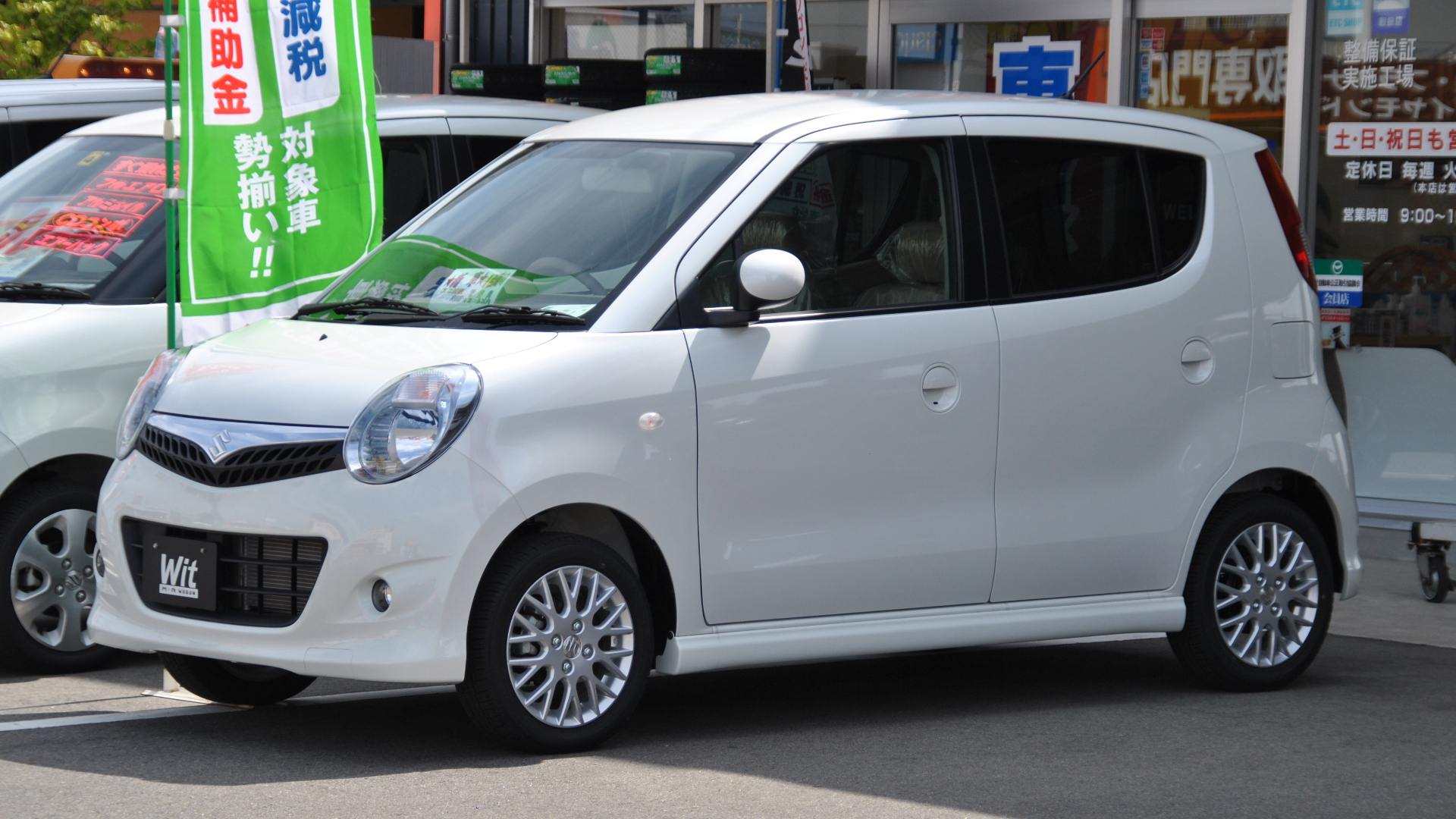
MR Wagon Wit (facelift)

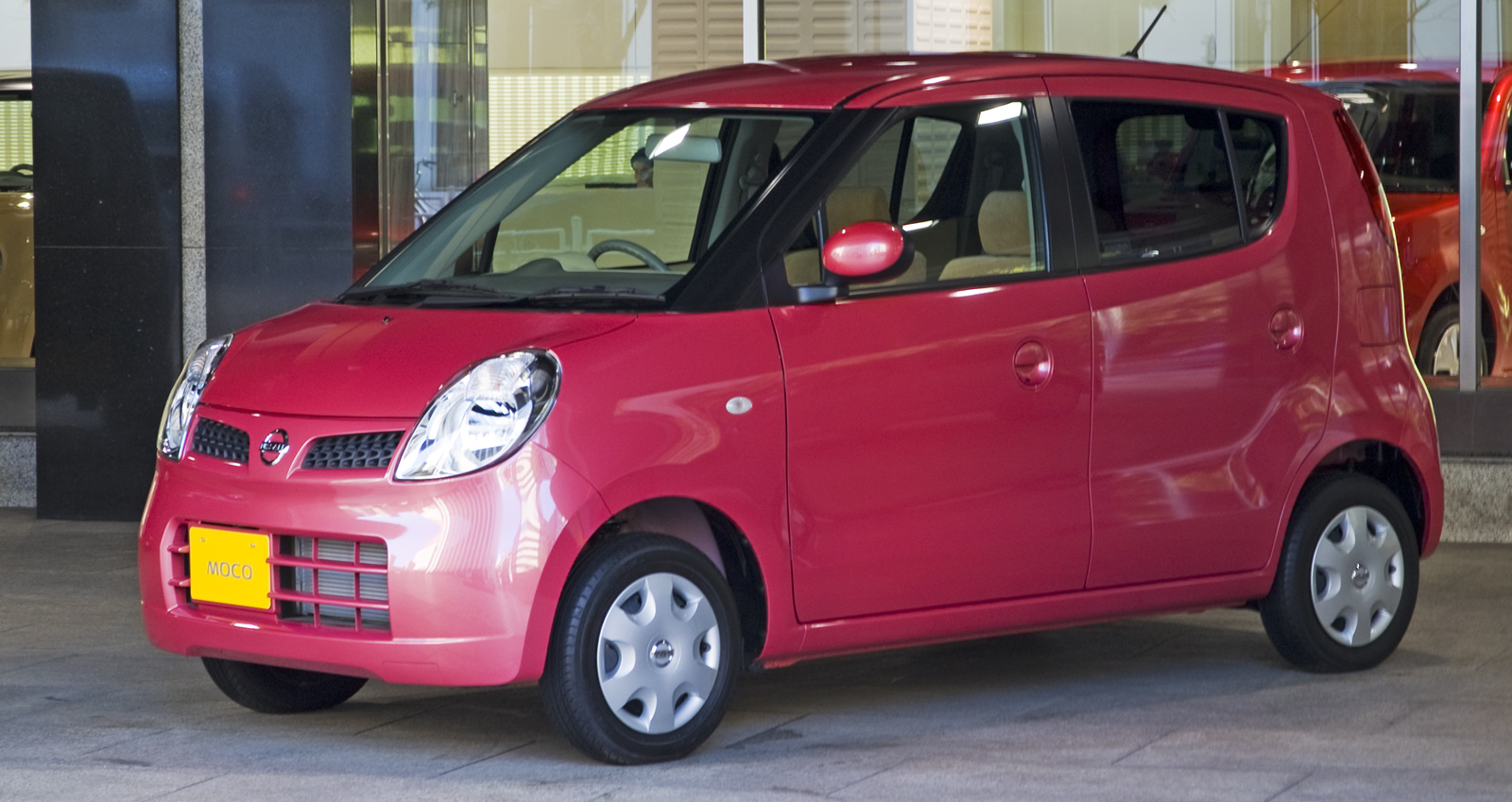
Nissan Moco

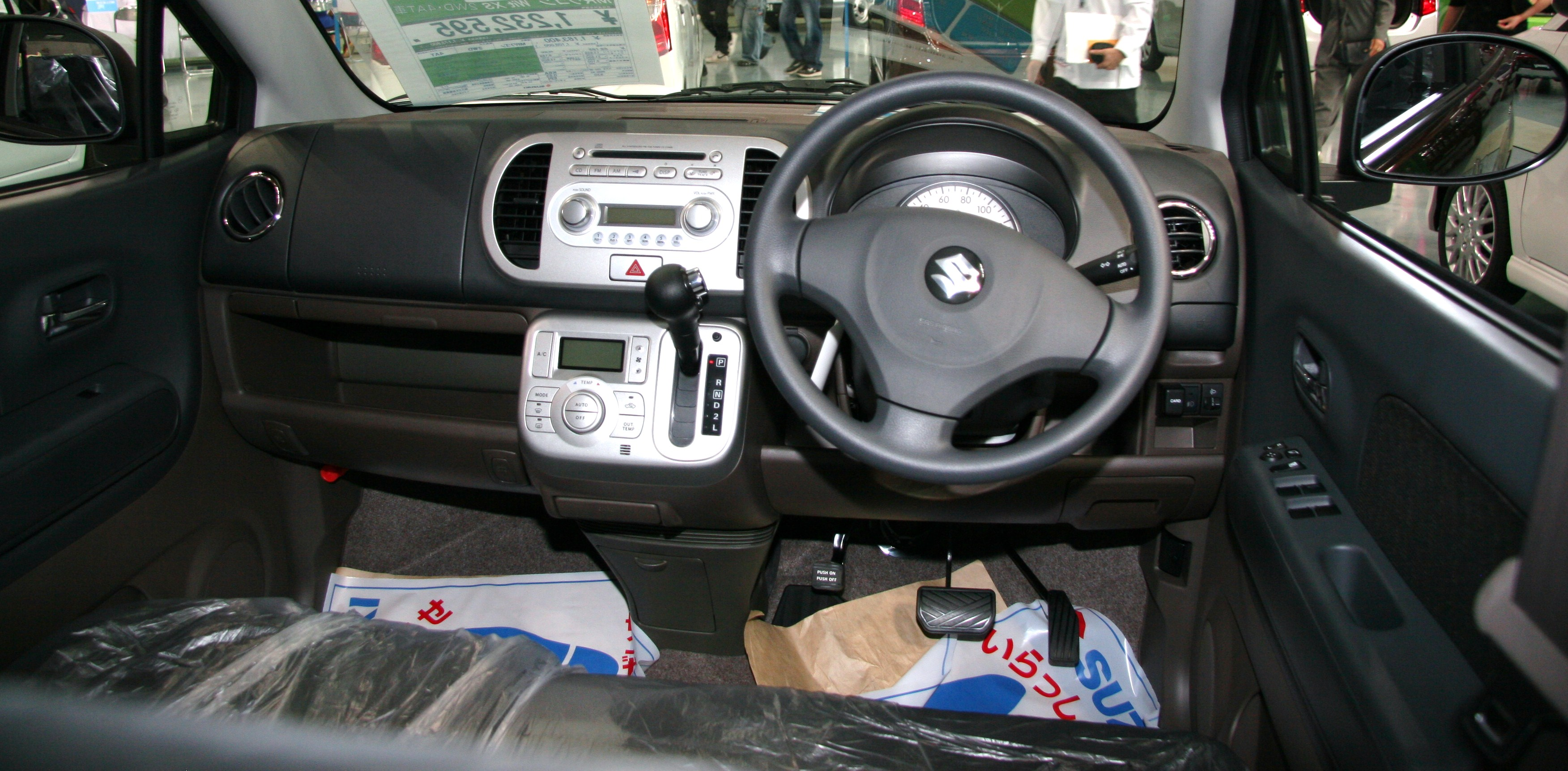
MR Wagon interior

== Third generation (MF33S; 2011) ==
Third generation (MF33S)
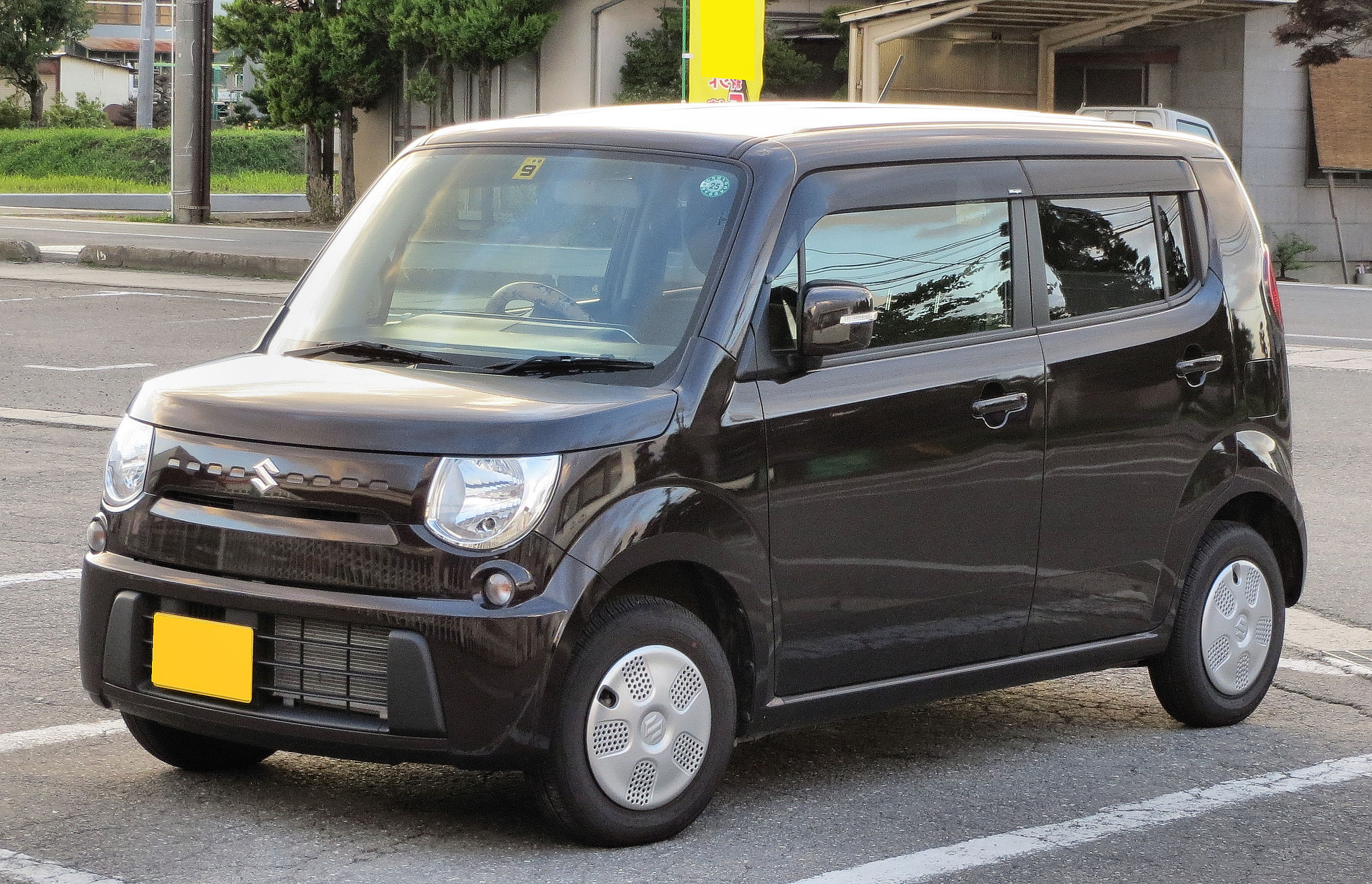
- MR Wagon X 4WD

Overview
- Also called: Nissan Moco
- Production: 2011–2016
- Assembly: Japan: Kosai, Shizuoka

Powertrain
- Engine: 658 cc R06A VVT DOHC I3; 658 cc R06A VVT DOHC turbo I3
- Transmission: CVT

Dimensions
- Wheelbase: 2,425 mm (95.5 in)
- Length: 3,395 mm (133.7 in)
- Width: 1,475 mm (58.1 in)
- Height: 1,625 mm (64.0 in)
- Curb weight: 790 to 880 kg (1,740 to 1,940 lb)

The third generation of the MR Wagon was launched in Japan on January 20, 2011. It carries the MF33S chassis code. A month later the Nissan Moco followed. It has the all new Suzuki R engine, which features variable valve timing and an unusually high compression ratio (11.0:1 for the naturally aspirated version).

As of 2013, the engines have been modified, and now features stop-start and other technology intended to lower consumption and emissions. This is the most fuel efficient wagon in the Kei class. In July 2013, the MR Wagon Wit, a better equipped model with a more traditional chromed grille, was introduced. The turbo engine is now restricted to the Wit TS, with all other versions offering the NA engine (L, X, Wit LS, Wit XS). In October, Nissan received a sister model of the MR Wagon Wit, called the Moco Dolce.

In December 2015, Suzuki announced that production of the MR Wagon would end, and that supplies of the car to Nissan had already been halted. Sales of the MR Wagon ended on March 31, 2016, while Nissan Moco sales continued until May 31, 2016.

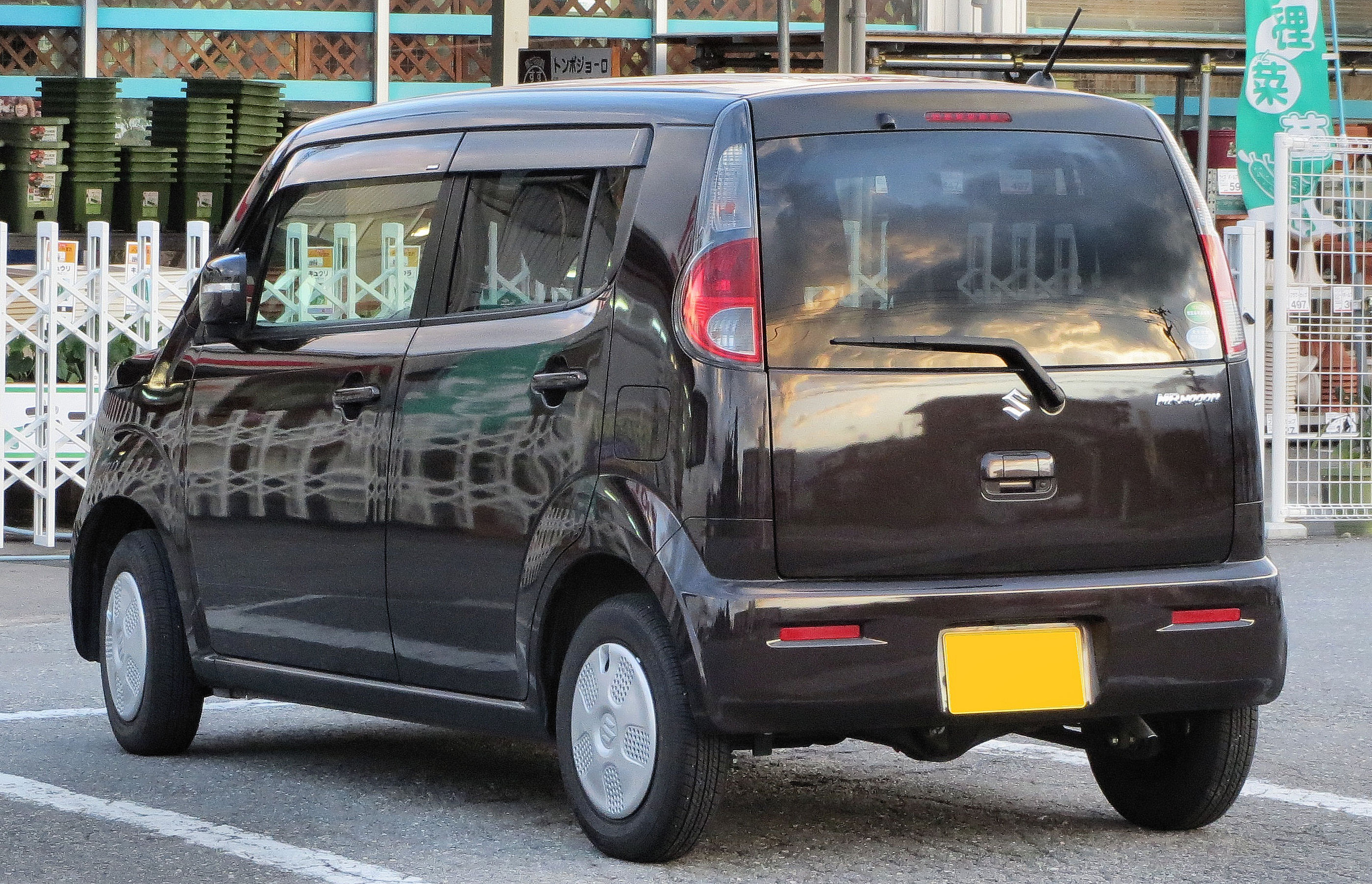
MR Wagon X 4WD

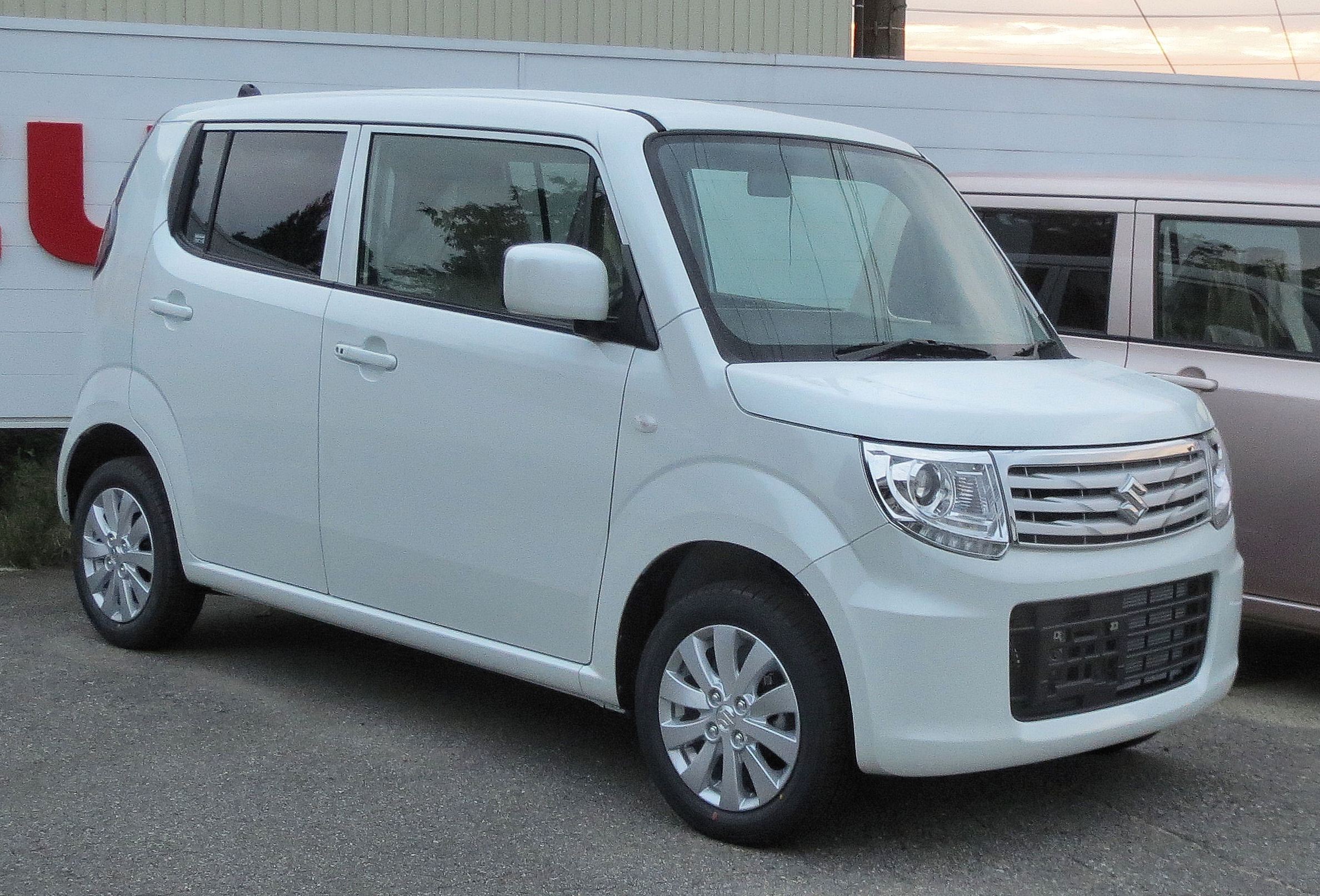
MR Wagon Wit LS

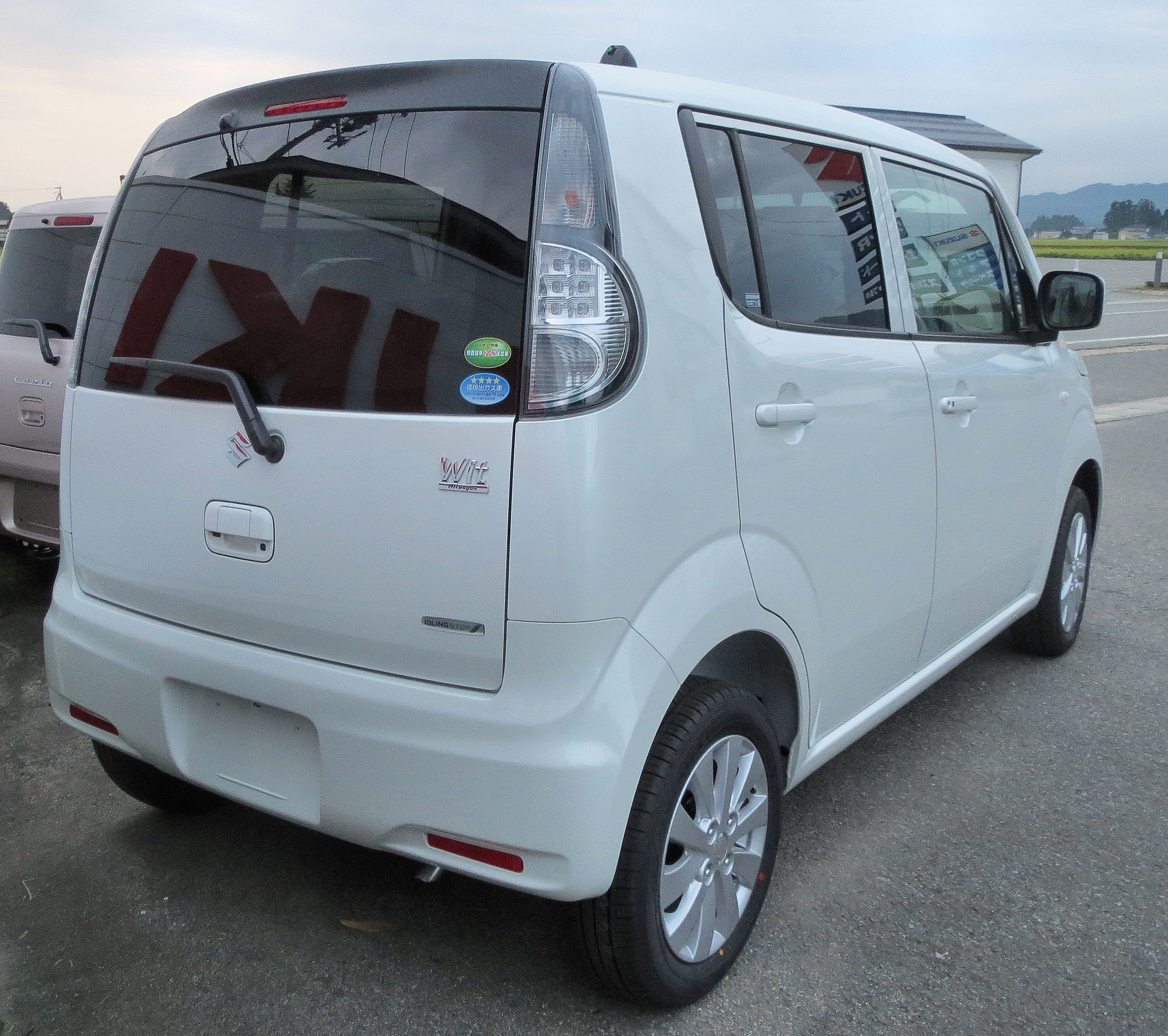
MR Wagon Wit LS

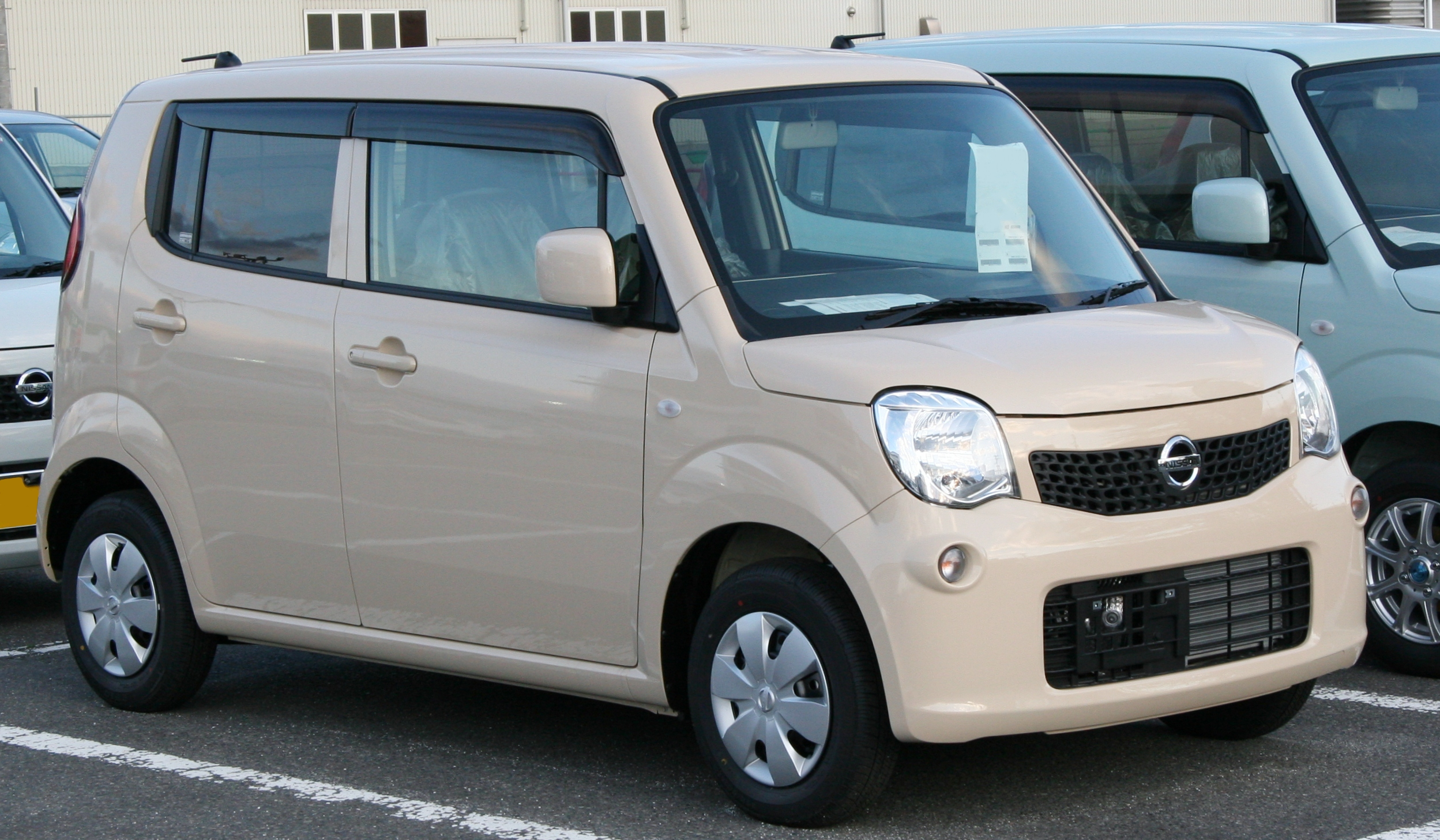
Nissan Moco S

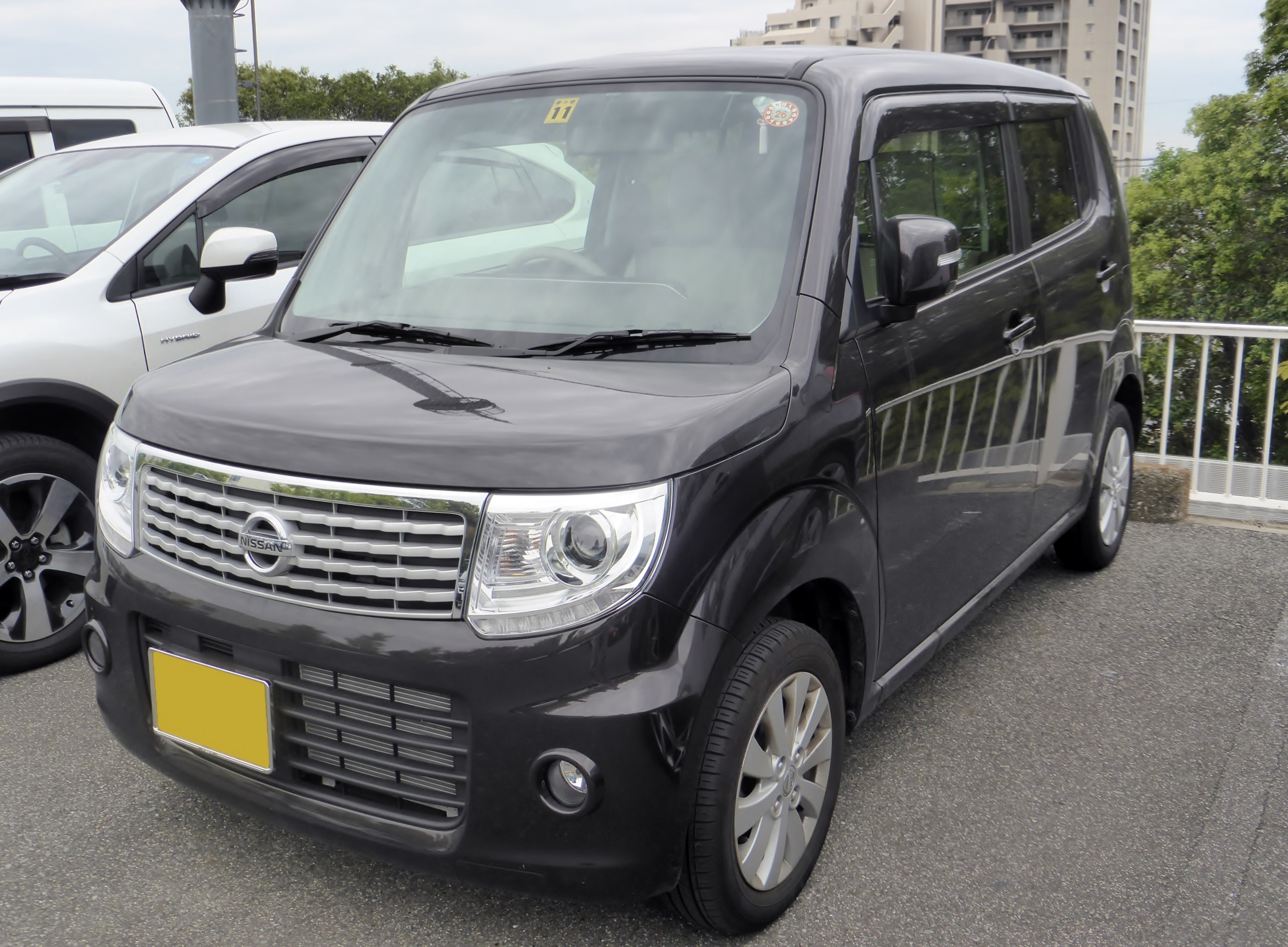
Nissan Moco Dolce X

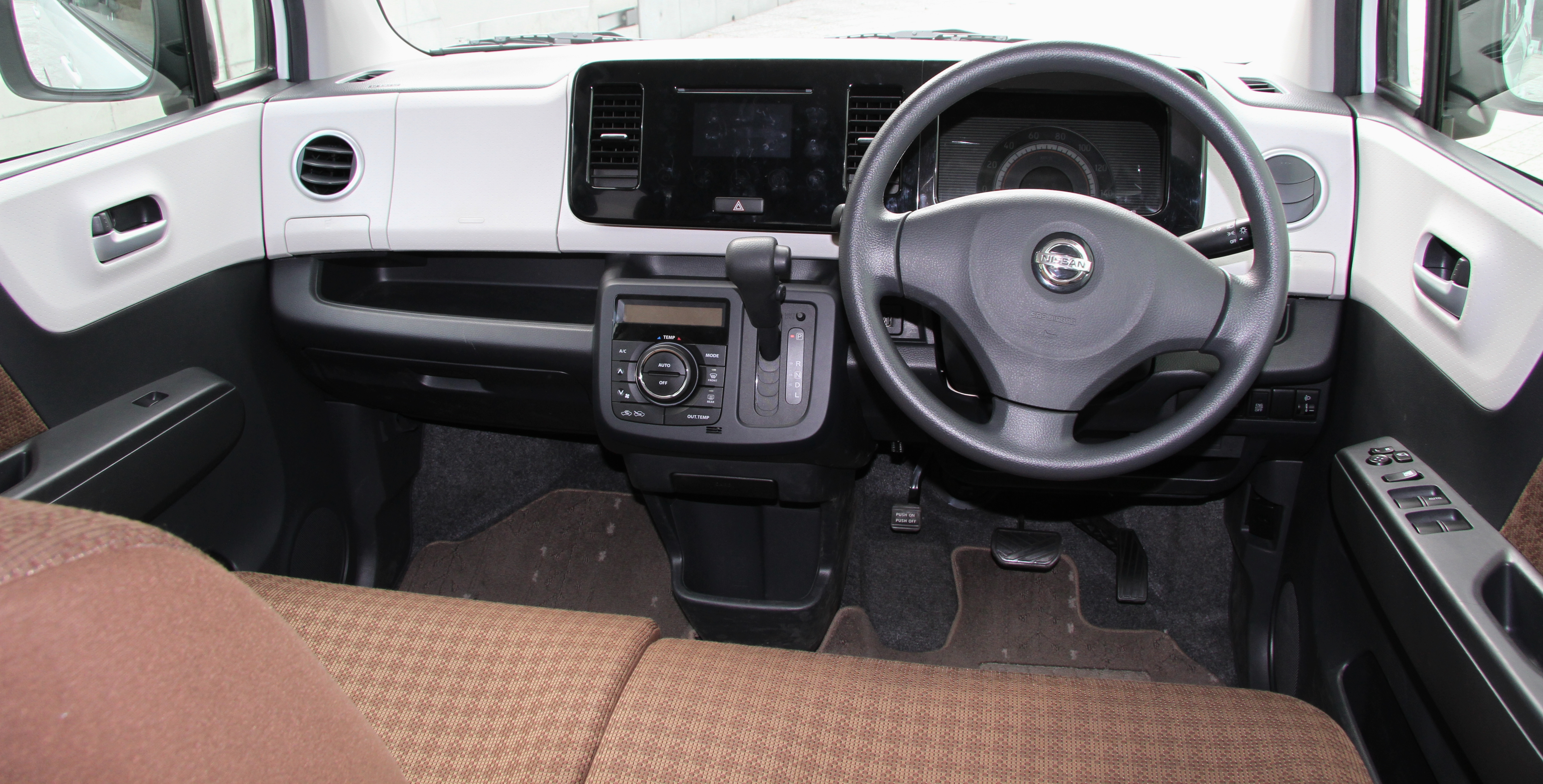
Nissan Moco interior
