= JATCO =

Japanese automatic transmission manufacturer

JATCO Ltd
- Company type: Unlisted public company (K.K.)
- Industry: Automotive
- Founded: 1970; 56 years ago
- Headquarters: Fuji, Shizuoka, Japan
- Area served: Worldwide
- Key people: Tomoyoshi Sato, (CEO)
- Revenue: ▲¥752.1 billion (2015) ▲¥740.1 billion (2014)
- Owners: Nissan (75%); Mitsubishi Motors (15%); Suzuki (10%)
- Number of employees: 14,300 (2017)
- Website: www.jatco.co.jp

JATCO Ltd (Japanese: ジヤトコ株式会社, Hepburn: Jiyatoko Kabushiki-gaisha), or Japan Automatic Transmission Company, is a company that manufactures automatic transmissions for automobiles.

== History ==
In August 1943, Nissan established an aircraft engine production plant in the town of Yoshiwara, Shizuoka. After World War II, this plant began producing components for the production of Nissan automobiles. In January 1970, Nissan established a joint venture with Toyo Kogyo (Mazda) and Ford Motor Company named Japan Automatic Transmission Co., Ltd. This company changed its name to JATCO Corporation in October 1989. Nissan spun off its AT/CVT (automatic transmission/continuously variable transmission) development divisions and its Fuji manufacturing plant into a subsidiary called TransTechnology, Ltd. in June 1999. Four months later, TransTechnology Ltd and JATCO Corporation merged to form JATCO TransTechnology Ltd.

In October 2001, as part of its restructuring, Mitsubishi Motors agreed to merge its transmission division with Jatco TransTechnology Ltd. Mitsubishi spun off its AT/CVT (automatic transmission/continuously variable transmission) division into a new subsidiary called Diamondmatic Co., Ltd. in April 2002. In April 2003, JATCO Ltd. merged with Diamondmatic Co., Ltd. JATCO TransTechnology Ltd changed its name to JATCO Ltd in April 2002. Nissan and Mitsubishi equity holdings in JATCO after the share exchange stood at 82% and 18%, respectively.

In March 2007, Suzuki Motor Corp. acquired a 10 percent stake in Jatco to ensure its supply of continuously variable transmissions. Suzuki purchased 7 percent of its Jatco stock from Nissan and 3 percent from Mitsubishi Motors. Nissan retains 75 percent ownership and Mitsubishi Motors retains 15 percent.

Overseas subsidiaries were established in Mexico (April 2003), France (October 2003), South Korea (May 2004), and Thailand (July 2011).

In September 2009, Jatco began production in Guangzhou, China (JATCO (Guangzhou) Automatic Transmission Ltd.). Production began in Thailand in September 2013. A second plant in Aguascalientes, Mexico began production in September 2014. A plant in Zhangjiagang, China (JATCO (Suzhou) Automatic Transmission Ltd.) began production in November 2019.

In 2012, Jatco became a supplier of gearboxes in Russia for AvtoVAZ. In 2019, Ministry of Industry and Trade (Russia) announced plans to open Jatco production in Tolyatti. However, the supply of gearboxes was stopped after the 2022 Russian invasion of Ukraine, which, in tandem with the failure of Russian companies to develop an analogue for the last 10 years, left AvtoVAZ without any models with an automatic gearbox.

As of March 2015, JATCO is 75% owned by Nissan, 15% owned by Mitsubishi Motors, and 10% owned by Suzuki.

While it was the transmission manufacturing division of Nissan it partnered with Mazda, and thus Jatco had long been supplying Nissan, Mazda, Subaru, Isuzu, Suzuki, BMW, Volkswagen, MG Rover Group and Land Rover. However, once it was independent, Jatco began supplying other automakers:

- December 1999 — Hyundai Motor Company
- January 2001 — Jaguar Cars
- December 2001 — London Taxis International
- January 2002 — Ford Europe
- April 2002 — Renault Samsung Motors
- April 2002 — Ford Lio Ho
- April 2004 — Changan Ford
- December 2005 — Chrysler Group U.S.A.
- October 2006 - Renault

JATCO became one of the largest suppliers of CVTs, and products from nearly every auto maker have used Jatco transmissions, with major exceptions of Honda Motor Company, who makes their own transmissions, and Toyota Motor Corporation, who has always used transmissions made by their Aisin subsidiary. GM continues to produce a majority of its transmissions through GM Powertrain, an outgrowth of Hydramatic.

CVT Product launch

- 2002 JF011E

- 2009 CVT 7 JF015E

- 2012 CVT 8 JF016E/JF017E

- 2015 CVT 7 WR JF020E

- 2021 CVT X JF022E

- 2023 CVT XS JF023E

== See also ==
- List of Jatco transmissions
- Jatco SC
