= Suzuki Wagon R Smile =

Minivan classed as a kei car produced by Suzuki

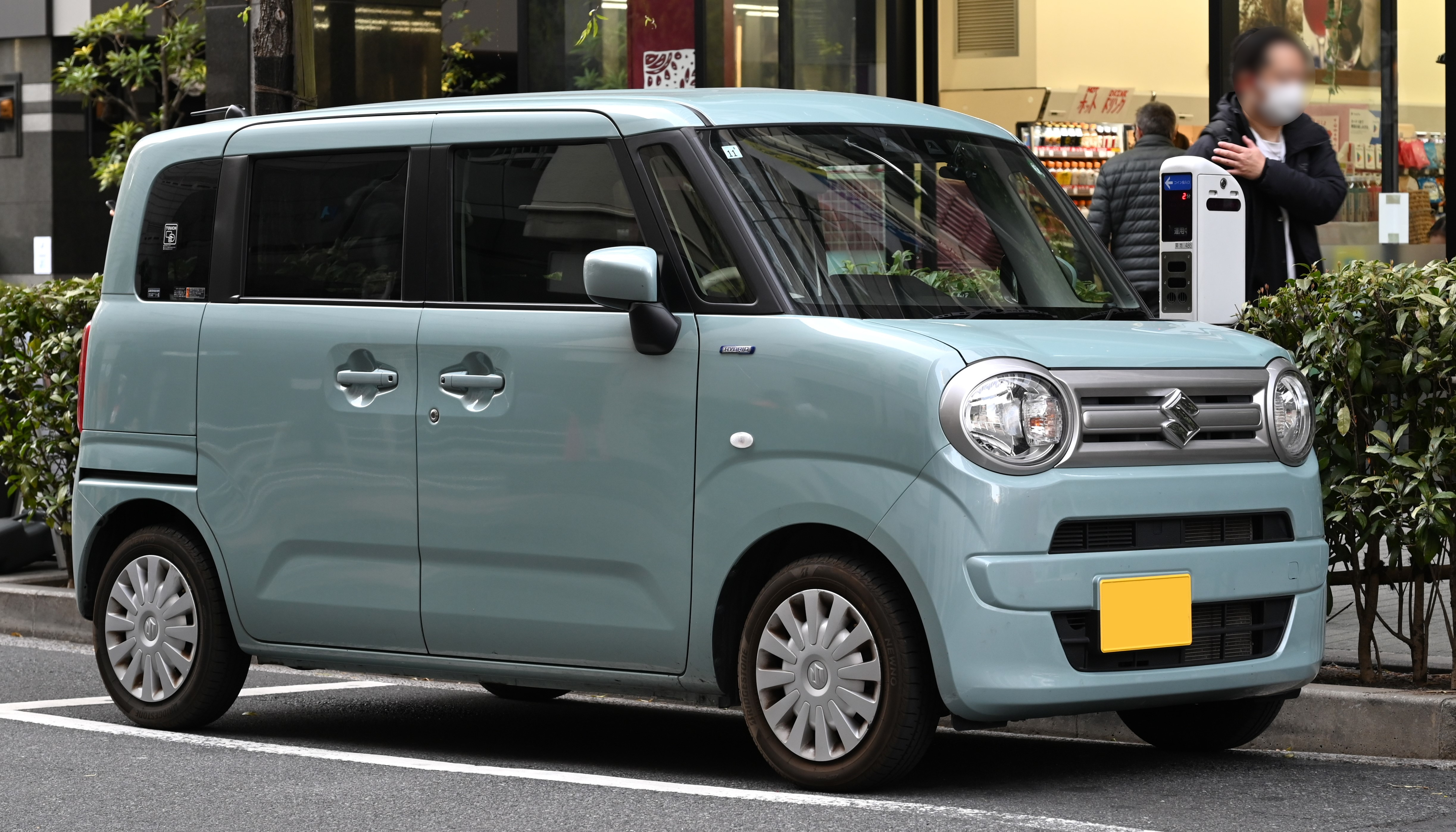
- Suzuki Wagon R Smile G

Overview
- Manufacturer: Suzuki
- Model code: MX81S; MX91S
- Production: 2021–present

Body and chassis
- Class: Kei car
- Body style: 5-door minivan
- Platform: HEARTECT platform
- Related: Suzuki Spacia; Suzuki Hustler; Suzuki Alto; Suzuki Wagon R

Powertrain
- Engine: 658 cc R06D DOHC I3 (petrol/MHEV)
- Electric motor: WA04C
- Transmission: CVT

Dimensions
- Wheelbase: 2,460 mm (96.9 in)
- Length: 3,395 mm (133.7 in)
- Width: 1,475 mm (58.1 in)
- Height: 1,695 mm (66.7 in)
- Curb weight: 840–870 kg (1,852–1,918 lb) (FWD); 890–920 kg (1,962–2,028 lb) (AWD)

The Suzuki Wagon R Smile (Japanese: ワゴンRスマイル) is a kei car manufactured and sold by Suzuki. It is a different series model based from the Wagon R, with which it is sold in parallel as of 2023.

The Wagon R Smile was announced on 27 August 2021 as a retro-styled kei car with sliding doors, expanding the Wagon R range. The name Smile was originally trademarked by Honda in 1995 and had been used on a scooter in the 1980s, but Honda consented to Suzuki using the name as long as it is in conjunction with "Wagon R" - meaning that Smile cannot become a standalone model name for Suzuki.

== Overview ==
Unlike the regular Wagon R, the Smile has sliding doors on both sides and a distinctive exterior design. The Smile model was created in response to the fact that about 40 percent of Wagon R users requested a model with sliding doors in surveys.

While the model number of the Wagon R series has typically been "MH" since the third generation model and up to the current sixth generation, this model receives the "MX" model code. The Smile is the first derivative model from the Wagon R since the Wagon R Wide, the predecessor of the standard passenger car tall wagon Solio. The mild hybrid R06D engine is familiar from most of Suzuki's contemporary kei car range and produces 49 PS (36 kW; 48 bhp) and 58 N⋅m (43 lb⋅ft).

To cut development costs, the Wagon R Smile uses various parts and substructures from other cars: the front doors and sliding doors share parts with the second-generation Spacia (MK53S), a kei "super high wagon", and the tailgate is derived from that of the sixth-generation Wagon R. According to Masashi Takahashi, chief engineer, combining parts from different vehicle models is unusual for Suzuki.

In December 2024, the Wagon R Smile was facelifted with a softer face while the specifications were adjusted. The mild hybrid models are now equipped with an electric parking brake and brake hold function. The G model now comes standard with sliding door closers (on both sides) and a keyless, push start system. The driver's side power sliding door was removed from the standard equipment of the Hybrid S. The color options were rearranged, with some new colors introduced, including a Gunmetal roof on some two-tone variants. Seven solid colors and five two-tone variants are now available, while the interior color schemes were also revised.

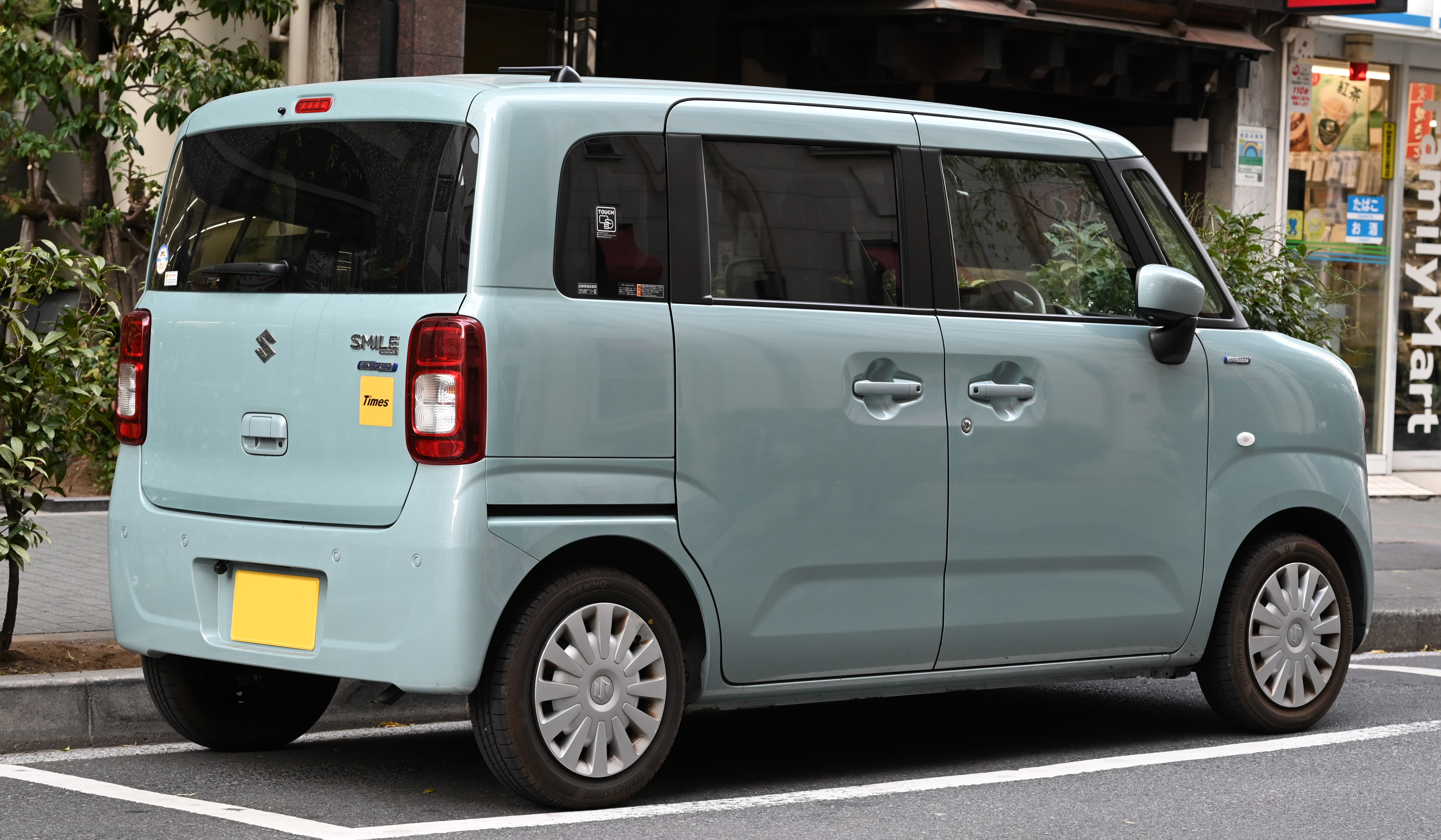
Rear view

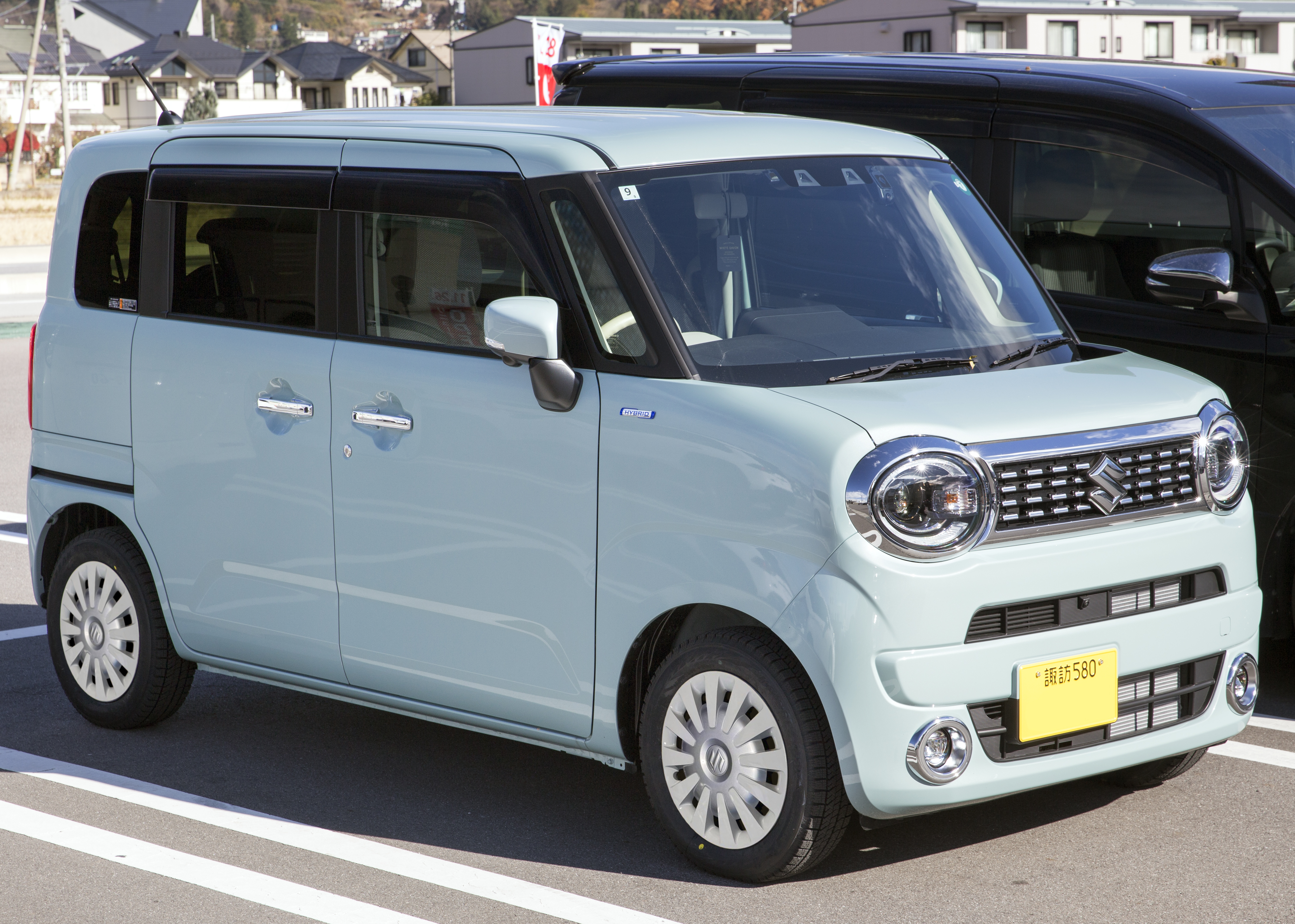
Suzuki Wagon R Smile Hybrid X (pre-facelift)

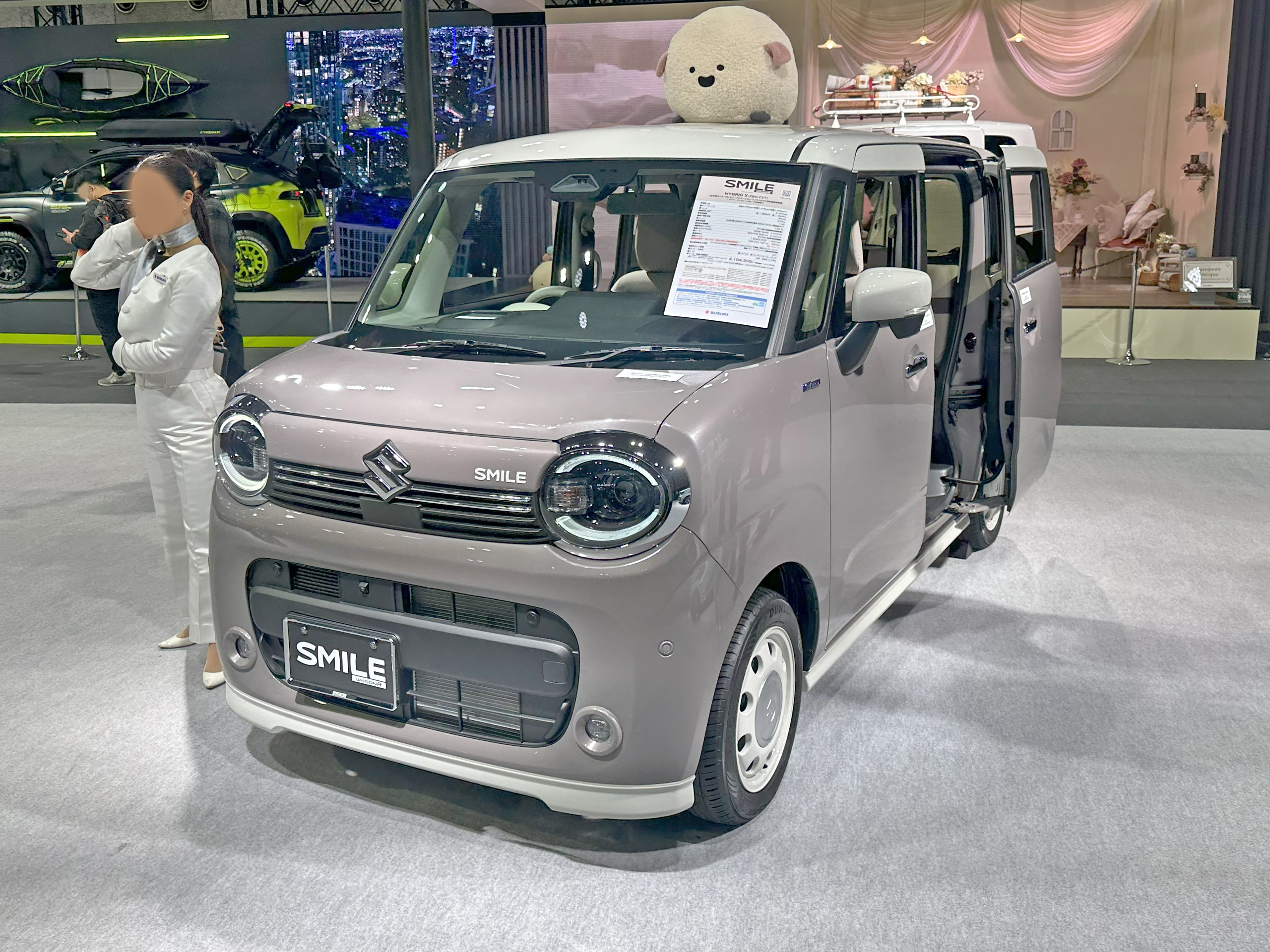
2024 facelift model

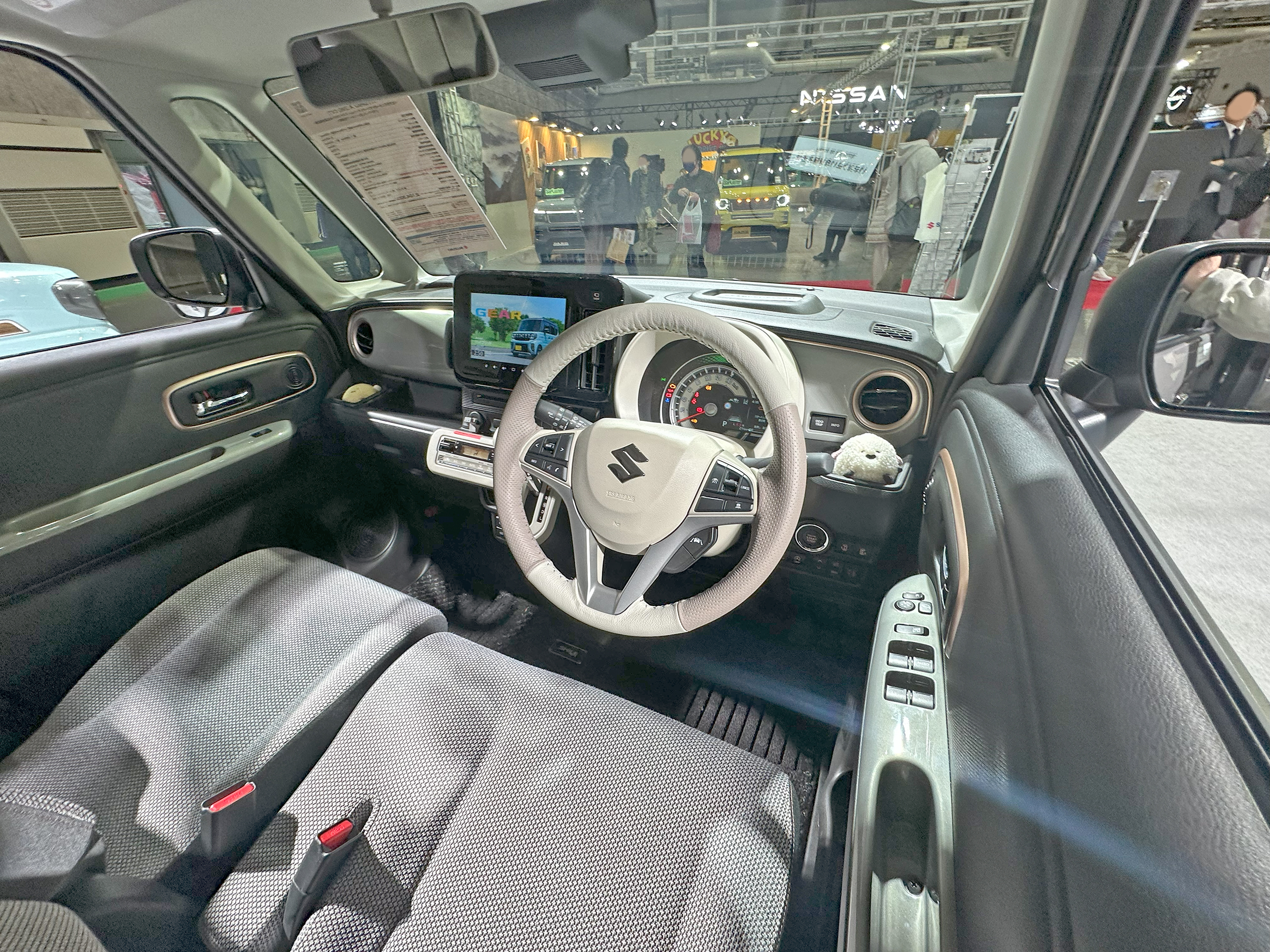
Interior

== Sales ==
Year	Japan
2021	30,675
2022	82,213
2023	72,235
2024	79,718
