= Suzuki Spacia =

Kei car

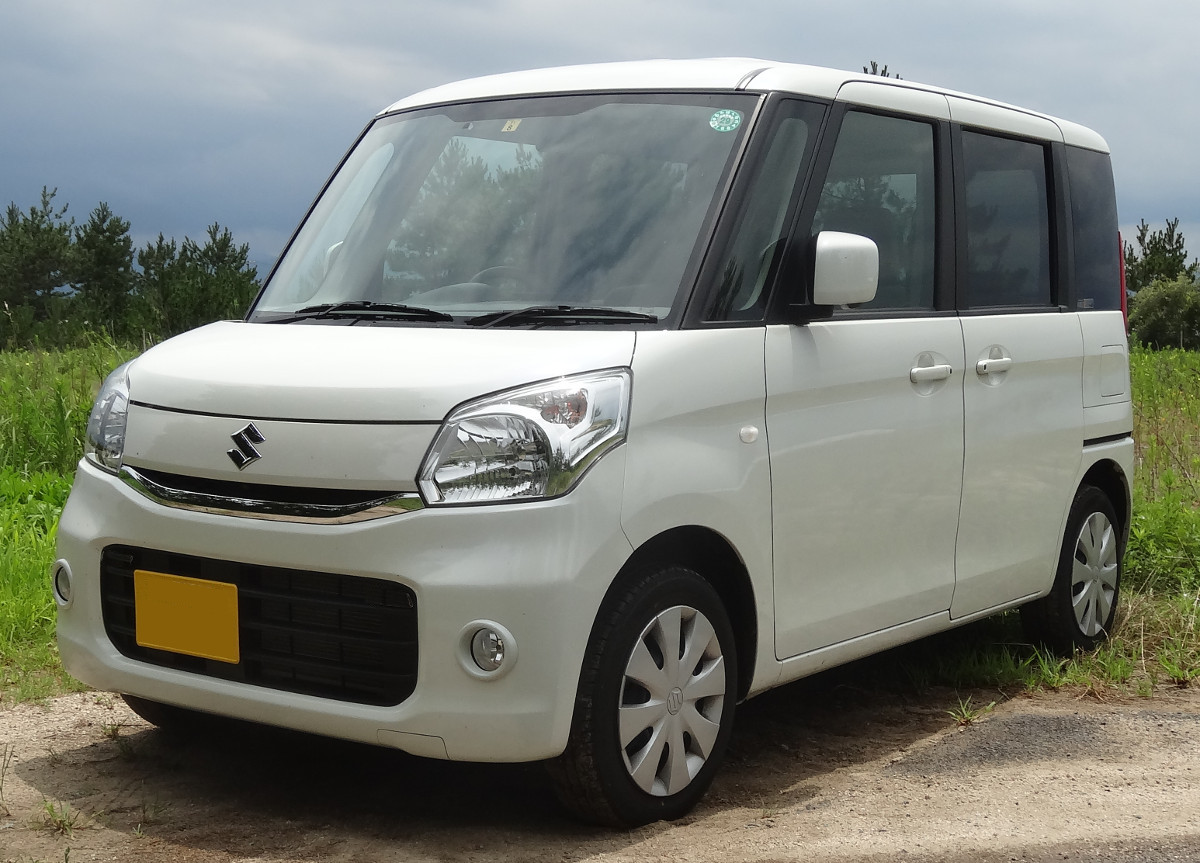
- 2015 Spacia 4WD

Overview
- Manufacturer: Suzuki
- Also called: Mazda Flair Wagon
- Production: February 2013 – present
- Assembly: Kosai Plant, Shizuoka Prefecture, Japan

Body and chassis
- Class: Kei car
- Body style: 5-door microvan
- Layout: Front-engine, front-wheel-drive/all-wheel-drive
- Doors: Power sliding doors

Chronology
- Predecessor: Suzuki Palette

The Suzuki Spacia is a kei car produced by Suzuki. It was a replacement for the Suzuki Palette, which was discontinued in February 2013. It improves upon fuel efficiency, is lighter and features a larger cabin than its predecessor.

The vehicle is also supplied to Mazda as the Mazda Flair Wagon which had been used in 2012 earlier.

== First generation (MK32S/42S; 2013) ==
First generation
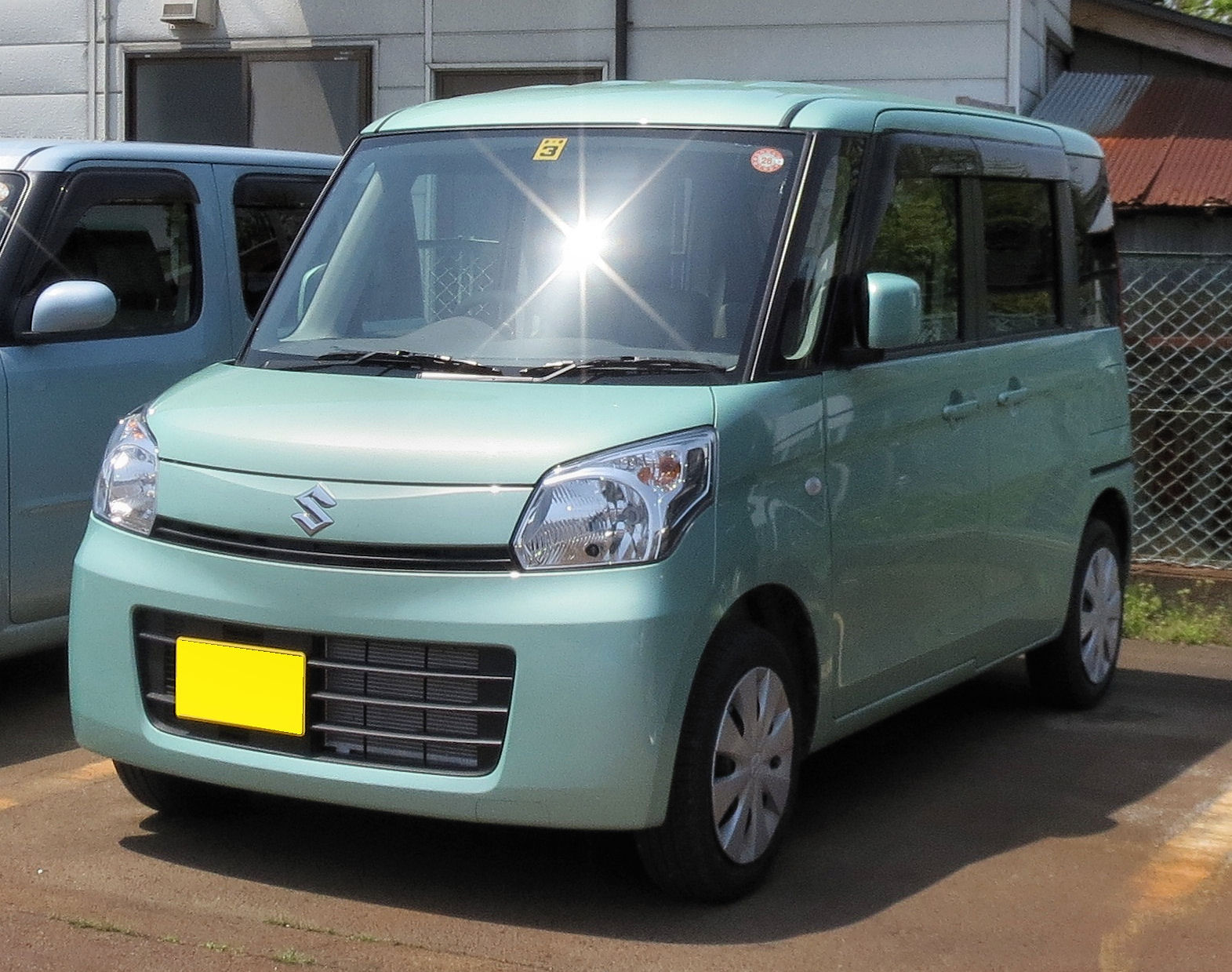
- Spacia X (pre-facelift)

Overview
- Model code: MK32S/42S
- Production: February 2013 – February 2018

Body and chassis
- Related: Suzuki Wagon R (MH34S/MH54S)

Powertrain
- Engine: 658cc R06A I3; 658cc R06A I3-T
- Electric motor: WA04A ISG
- Transmission: Jatco CVT
- Battery: Lithium-ion

Dimensions
- Wheelbase: 2,425 mm (95.5 in)
- Length: 3,395 mm (133.7 in)
- Width: 1,475 mm (58.1 in)
- Height: 1,735–1,740 mm (68.3–68.5 in)
- Curb weight: 840–950 kg (1,852–2,094 lb)

The first-generation Spacia was released in March 2013 with three grades; G, X and the turbocharged T. The Mazda Flair Wagon followed later in April with two grades; XG and XS, all with naturally aspirated engine. Mazda had been selling the Suzuki Palette under that name and continued to use it on the new Spacia after the Palette was discontinued.

The upmarket variant called Spacia Custom was released in June 2013 with three grades; GS, XS and the turbocharged TS. Mazda also introduced their version of the Spacia Custom as Flair Wagon Custom Style a month later with two grades; XS and the turbocharged XT.

Limited editions based on X and XS grades were launched in June 2014. Mazda also launched a limited edition based on XS grade in the same month. Another limited edition of Spacia Custom XS called J Style was launched in December.

The car received its facelift in May 2015. A limited edition based on G grade was launched in December.

A new Z grade was added to the Spacia Custom line up in December 2016, fitted with a different front end. This particular sub-model was not adopted by Mazda.

Production of the first generation largely ended in December 2017, with the introduction of the second generation Spacia. The wheelchair accessible variants, however, continued to be built until February 2018, when they were also replaced.

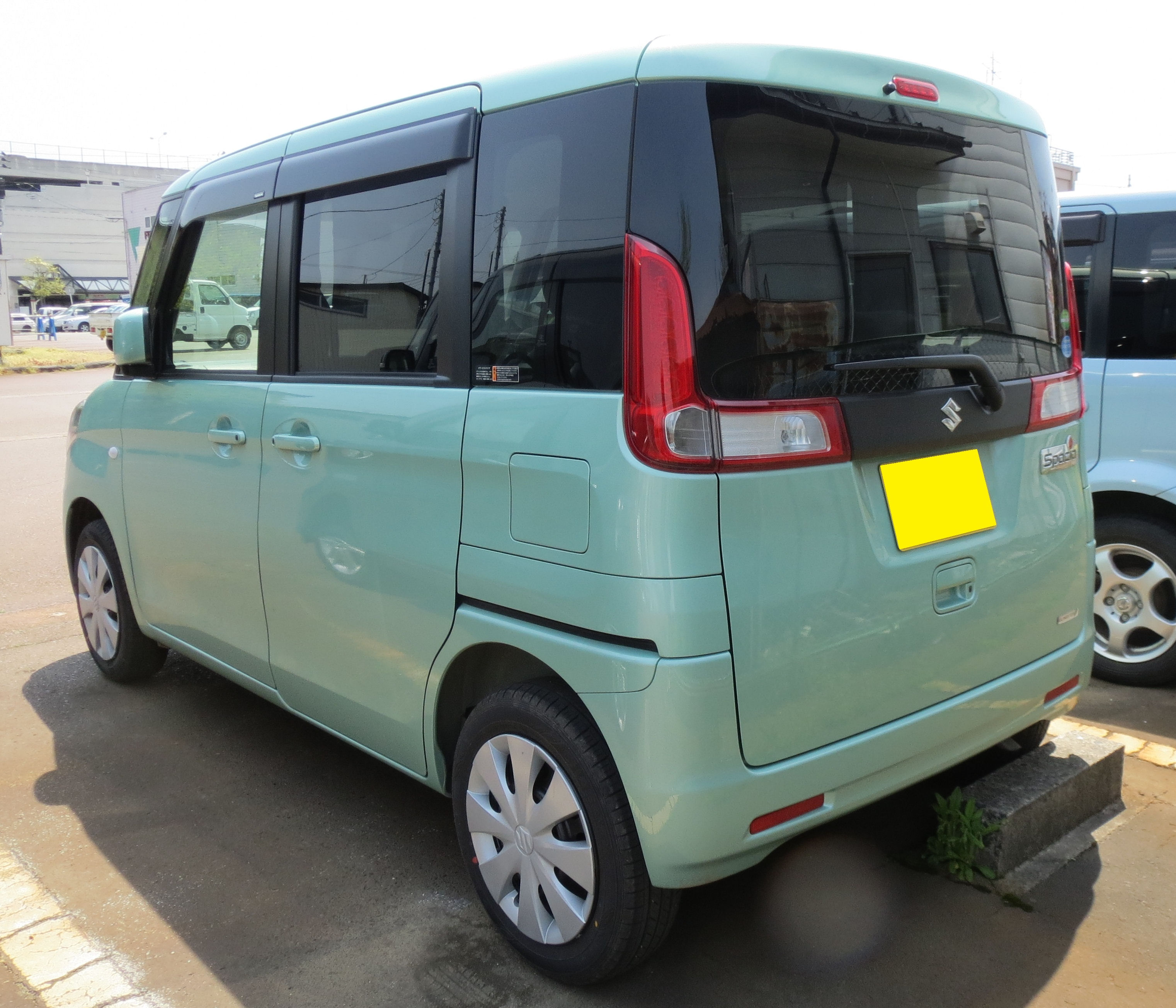
Rear view

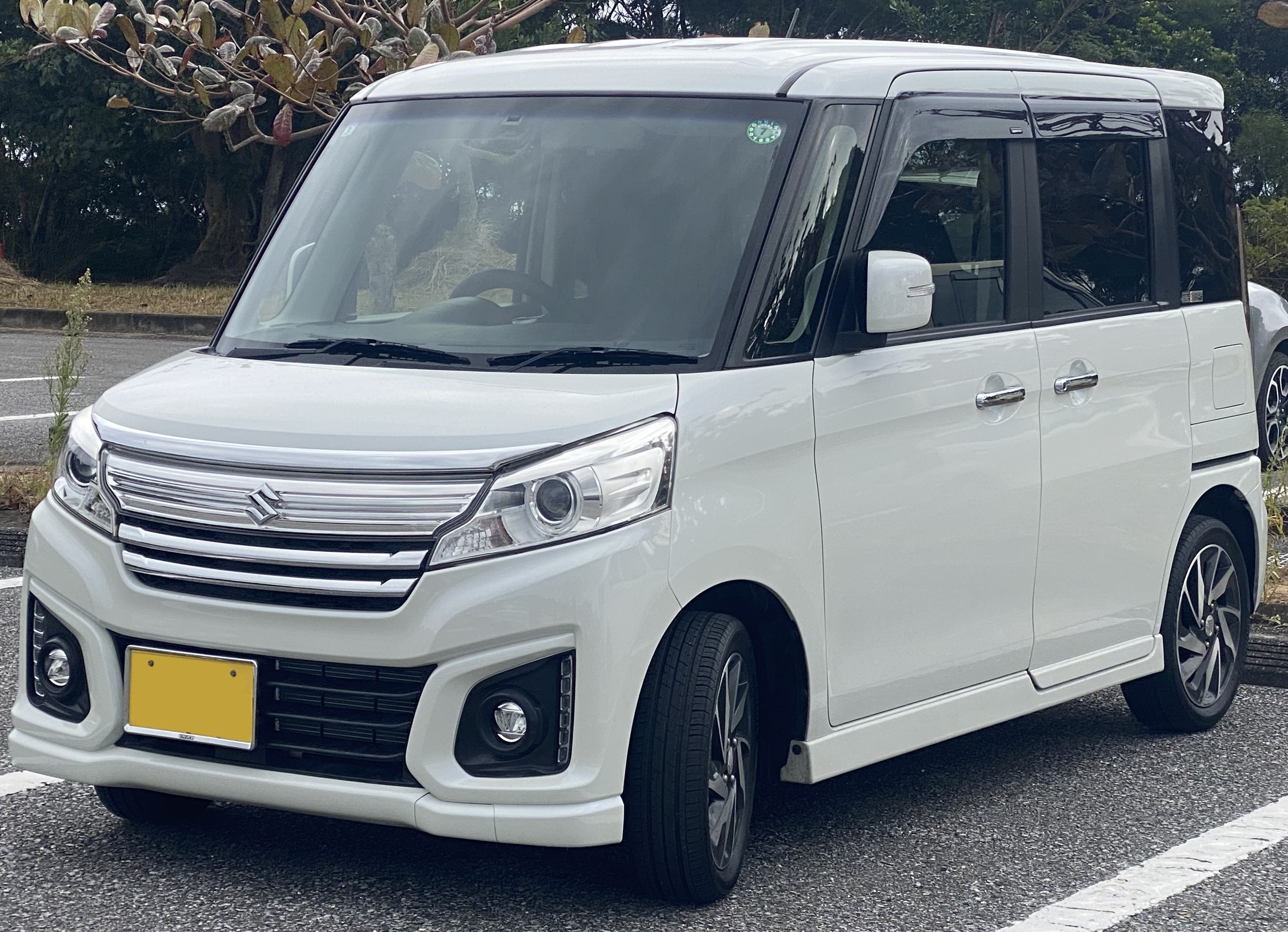
Suzuki Spacia Custom

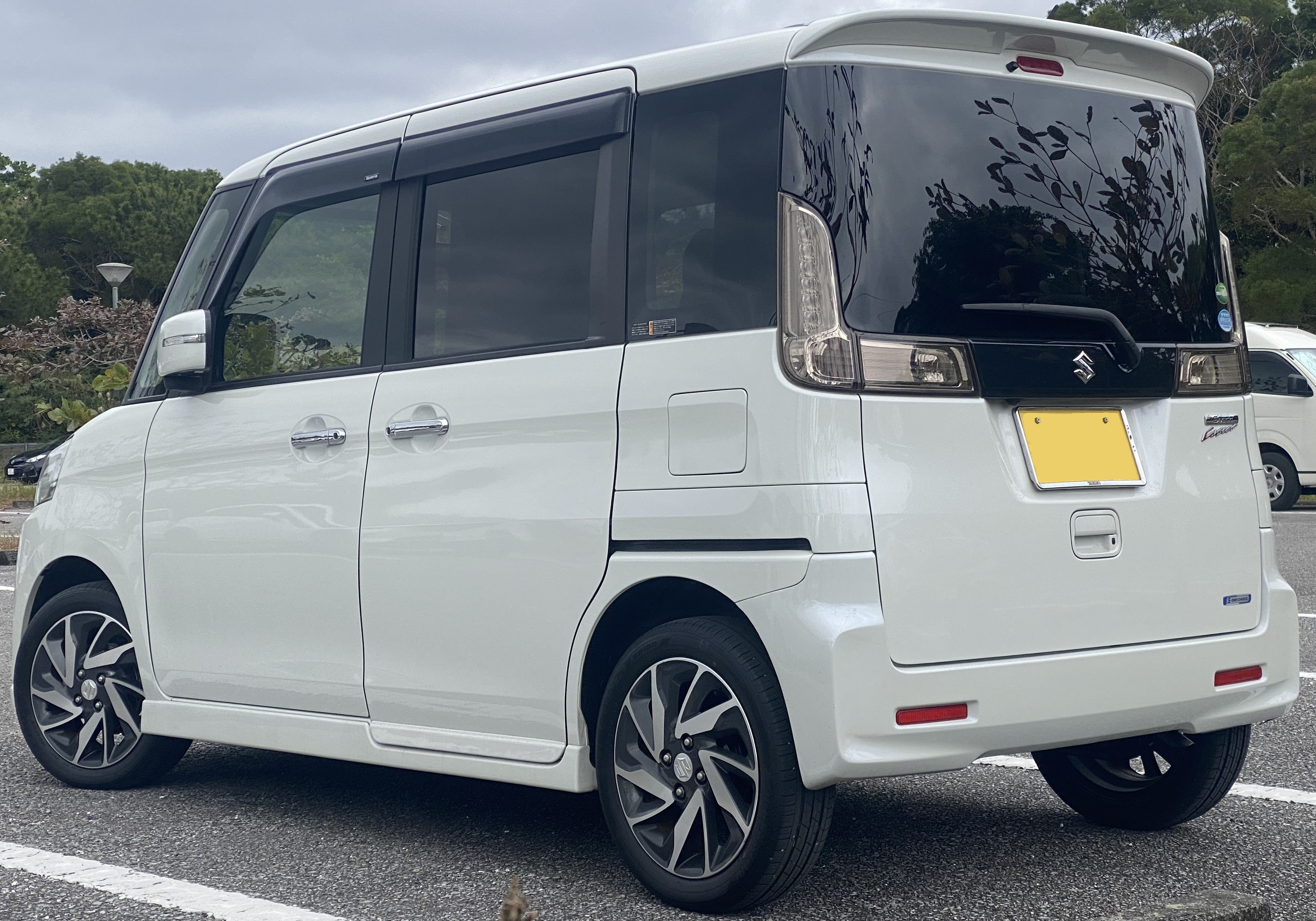
Rear view

== Second generation (MK33V/MK53S; 2017) ==
Second generation
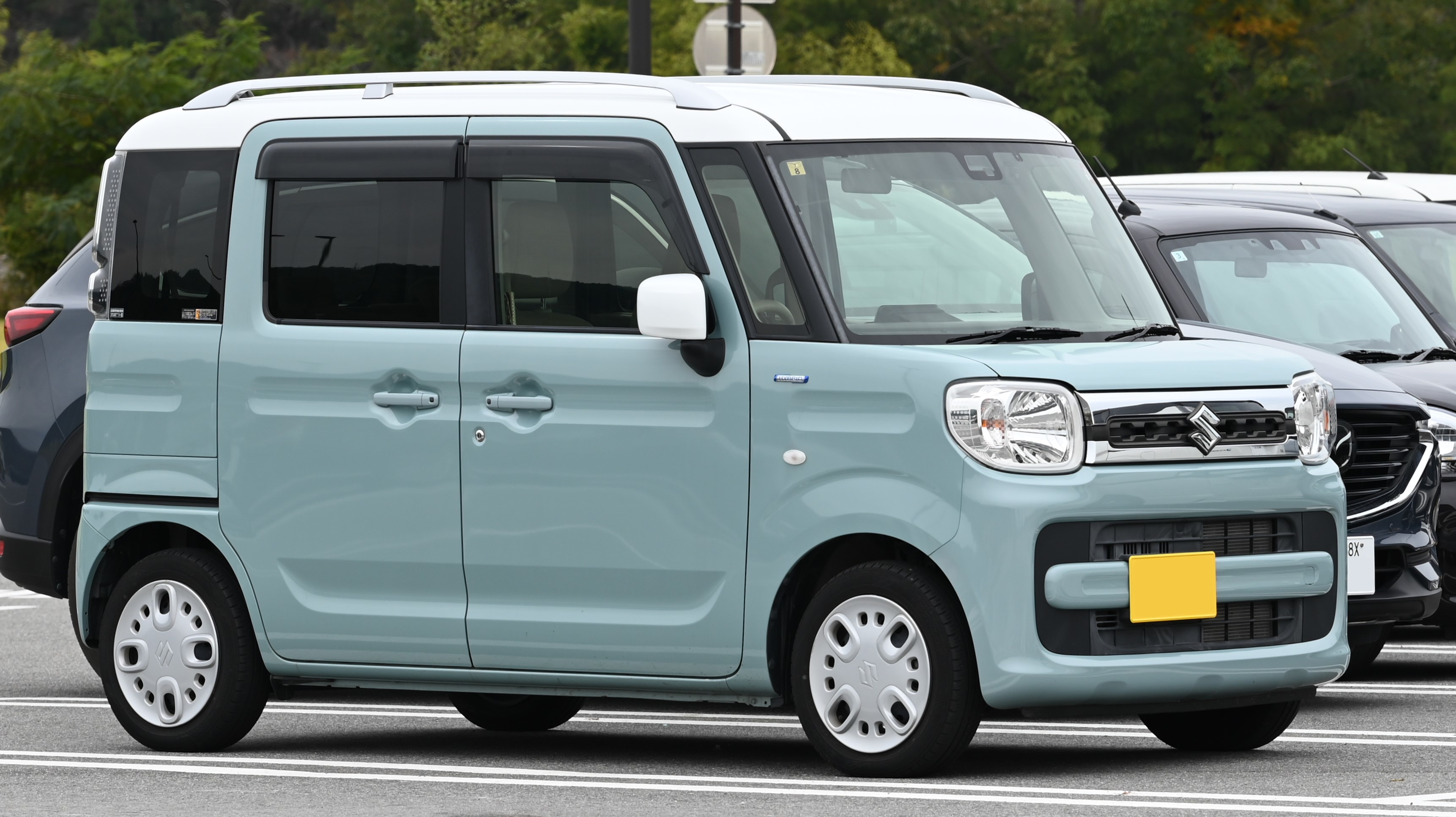
- Spacia Hybrid G

Overview
- Model code: MK53S; MK33V
- Production: December 2017– October 2023 (fleet only since 2023)

Body and chassis
- Platform: HEARTECT platform
- Related: Suzuki Wagon R (MH35S/MH55S); Suzuki Wagon R Smile

Powertrain
- Engine: 658cc R06A I3; 658cc R06A turbo I3
- Electric motor: WA05A ISG
- Transmission: Jatco CVT

Dimensions
- Wheelbase: 2,460 mm (96.9 in)
- Length: 3,395 mm (133.7 in)
- Width: 1,475 mm (58.1 in)
- Height: 1,785–1,800 mm (70.3–70.9 in)
- Curb weight: 850–940 kg (1,874–2,072 lb)

The second-generation Spacia was unveiled at the 2017 Tokyo Motor Show, along with the sporty Spacia Custom. It is built on the same lightweight HEARTECT platform as the sixth-generation Wagon R. Both the Spacia and Spacia Custom went on sale on 14 December 2017. The Spacia is available in G and X grade levels, while the Spacia Custom is available in GS, XS and XS Turbo grade levels. Both are only available with hybrid powertrain. As before, Mazda continued to offer this car as the Mazda Flair Wagon (and Flair Wagon Custom Style), with development matching those of the Suzuki-badged variants.

On 20 December 2018, the crossover variant of the second-generation Spacia, called Spacia Gear, was released and is available in XZ and XZ Turbo grade levels with hybrid powertrain. Mazda's version of this is called the Mazda Flair Wagon Tough Style.

Both the second-generation Spacia and Spacia Custom received a facelift on 3 December 2021 with new grille design, as well as a new grade for Spacia Gear called "My Style" features a coloured grille and white coloured roof with two-tone option.

On 26 August 2022, the commercial variant of the second-generation Spacia, called Spacia Base, was released with pre-facelift Spacia Custom's front fascia while retaining the regular Spacia's rear lamps and rear bumper. It is available in GF and XF grade levels with naturally aspirated engine. In October 2023, all grades except Spacia Base was discontinued.

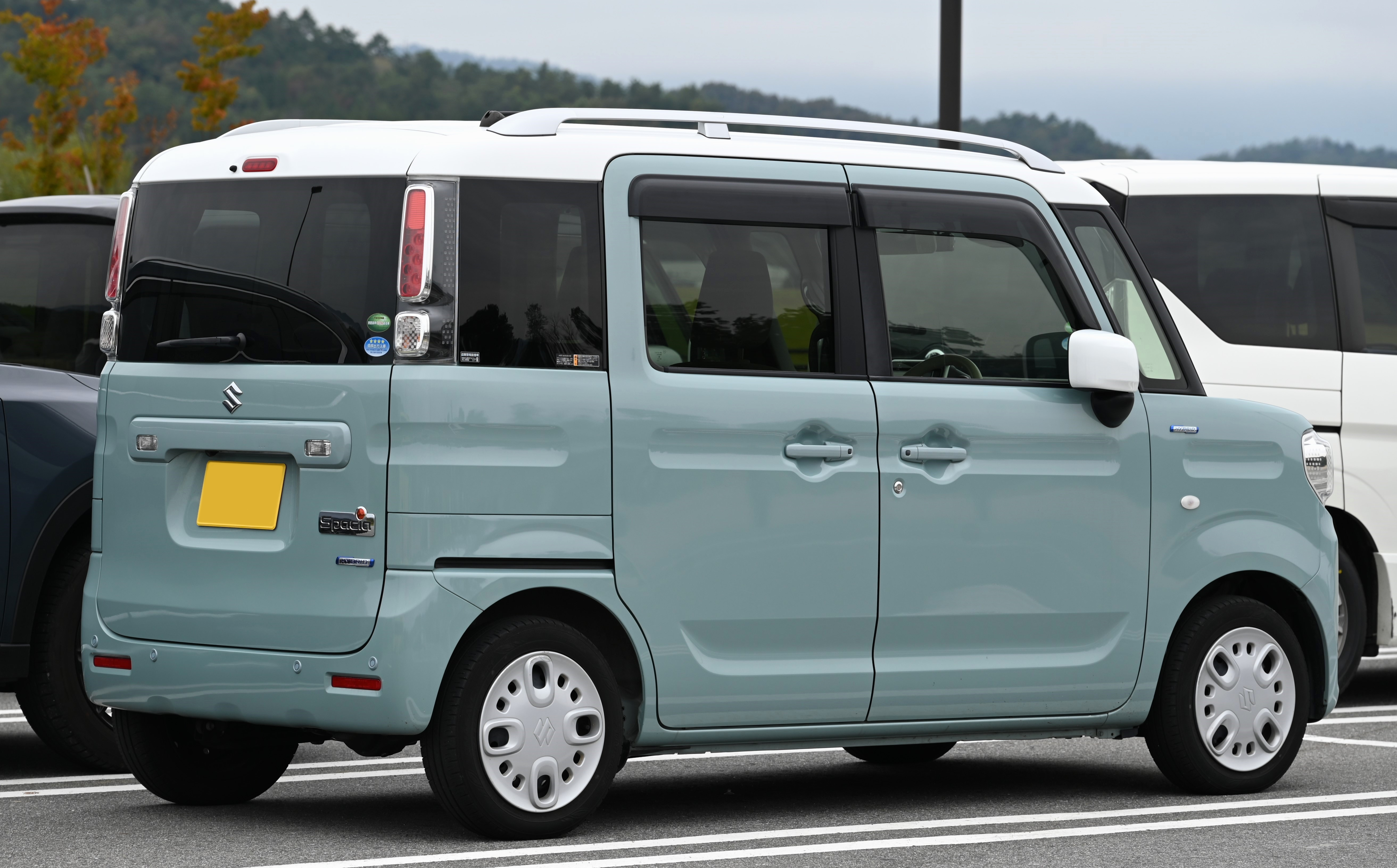
Suzuki Spacia Hybrid G (2017-2021 model, rear view)

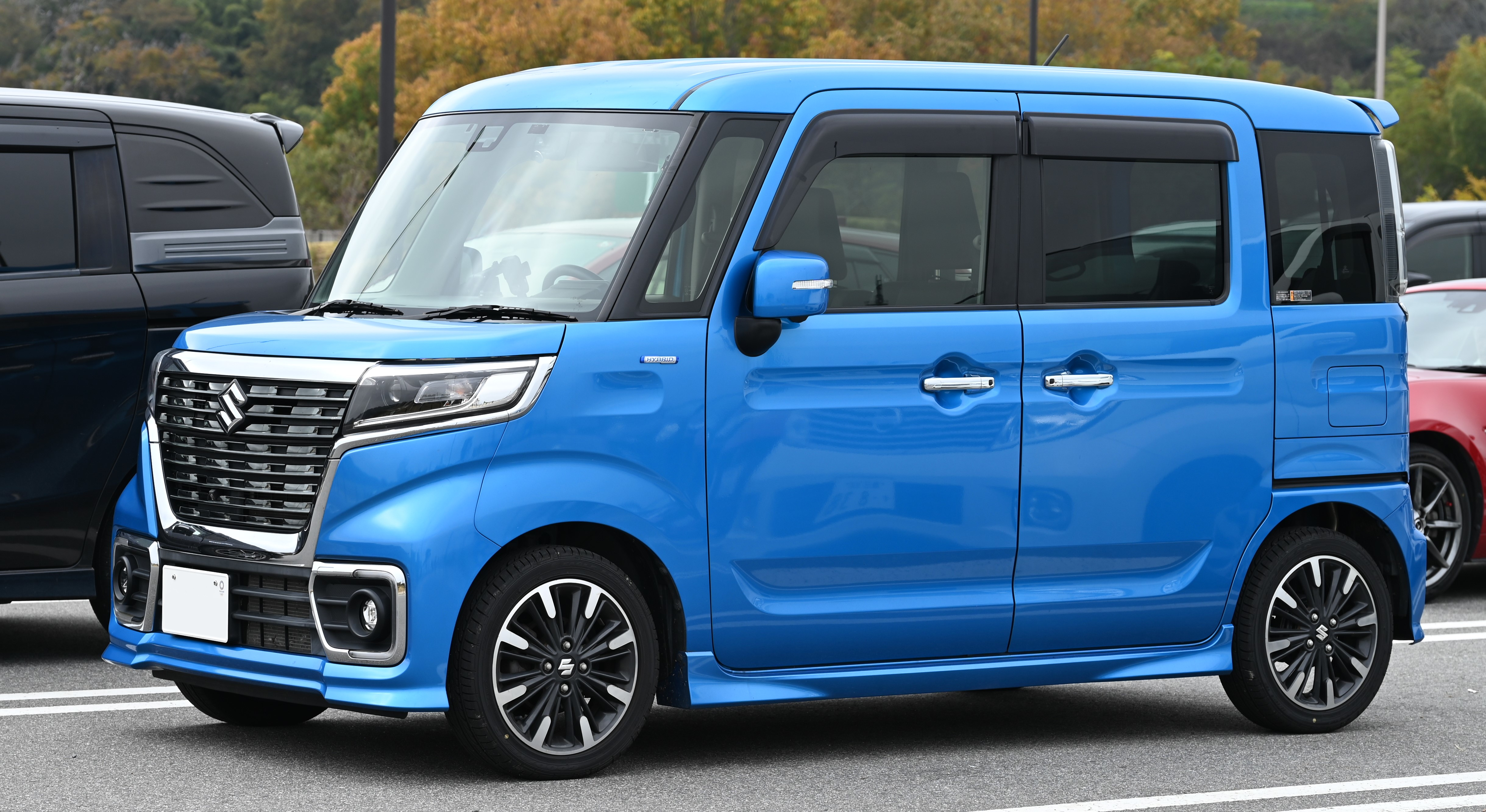
Suzuki Spacia Custom Hybrid XS (2017–2021 model)

Suzuki Spacia Custom Hybrid XS (rear view)

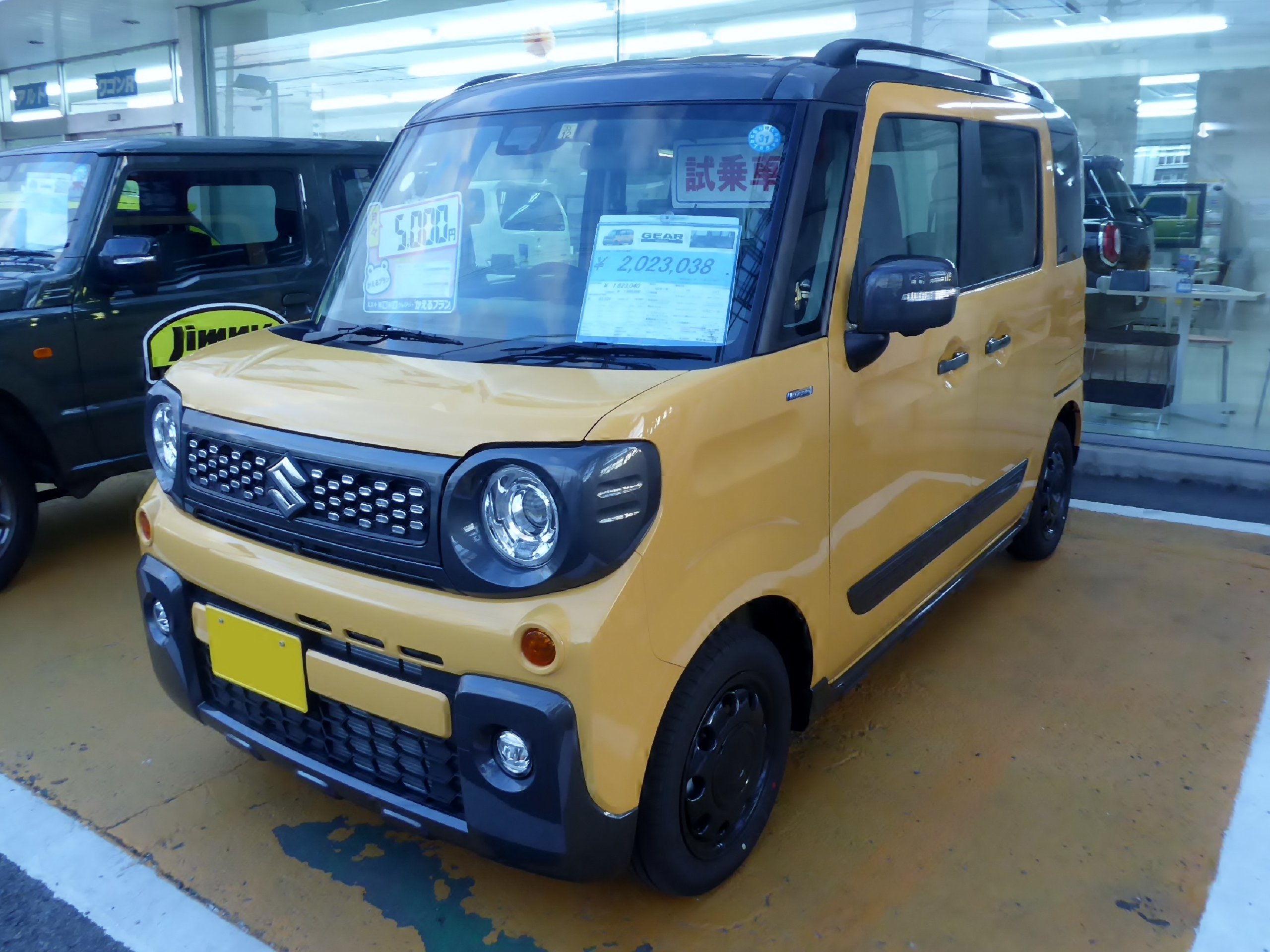
Suzuki Spacia Gear Hybrid XZ Turbo

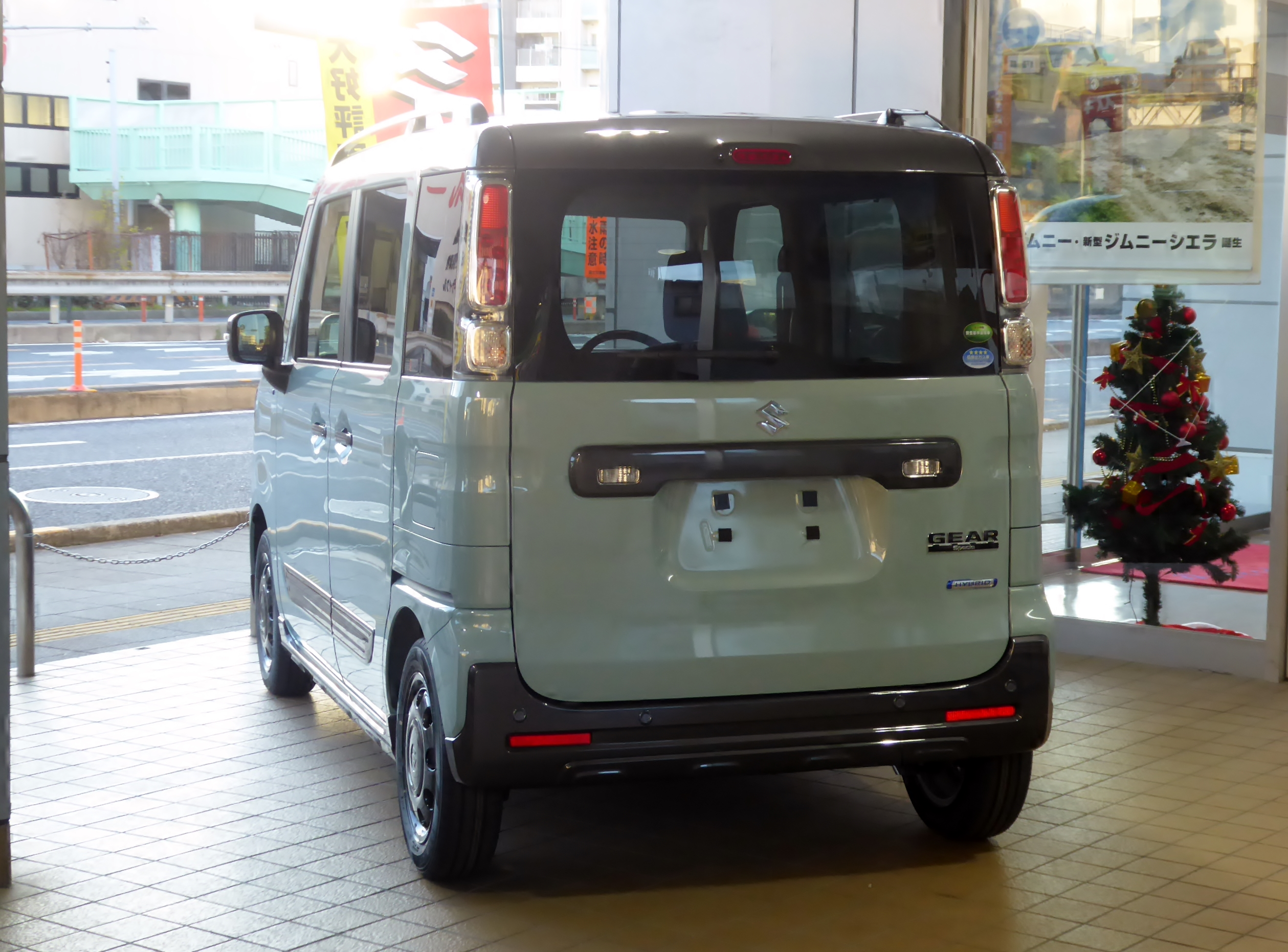
Rear view

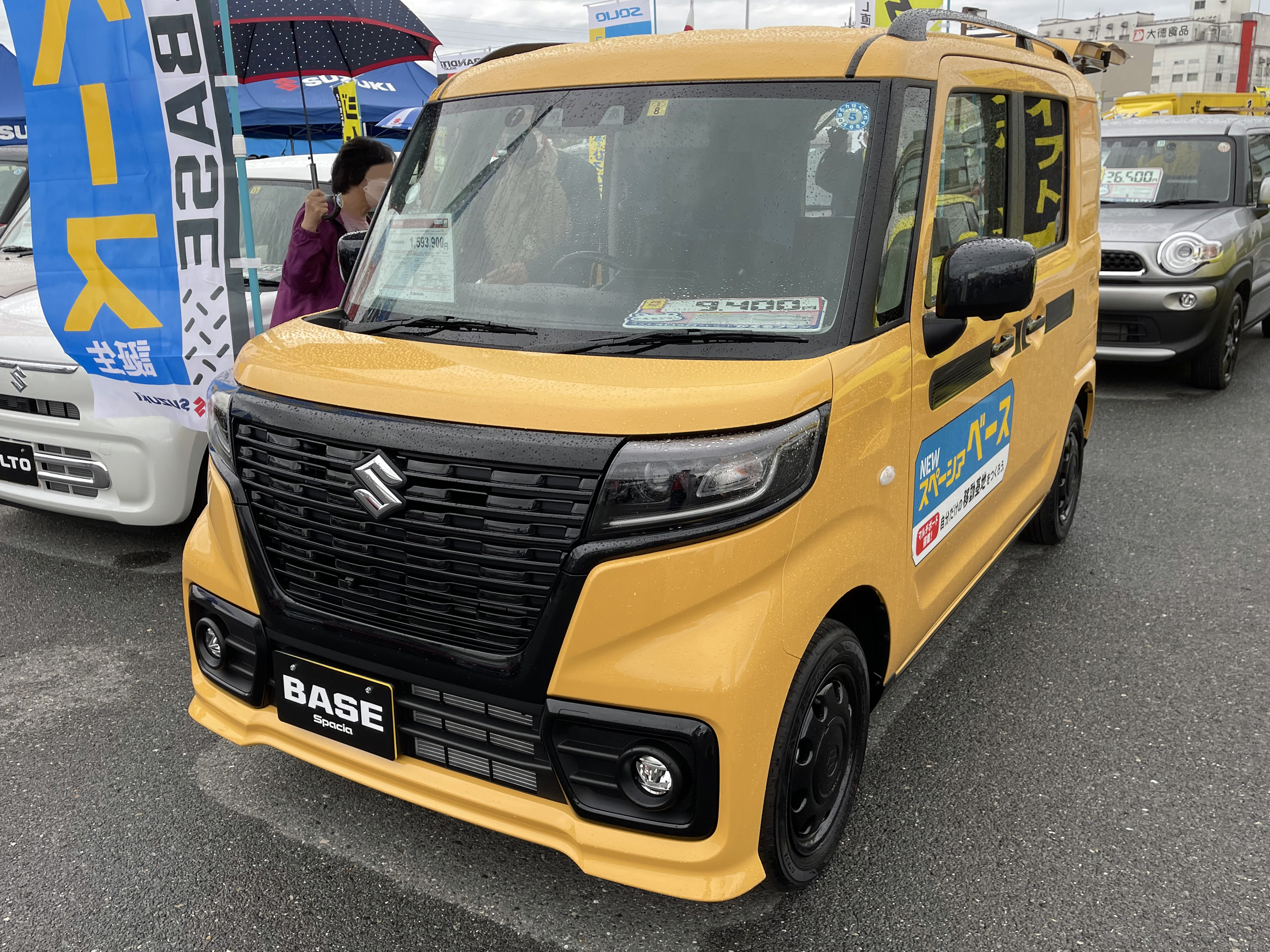
Suzuki Spacia Base XF

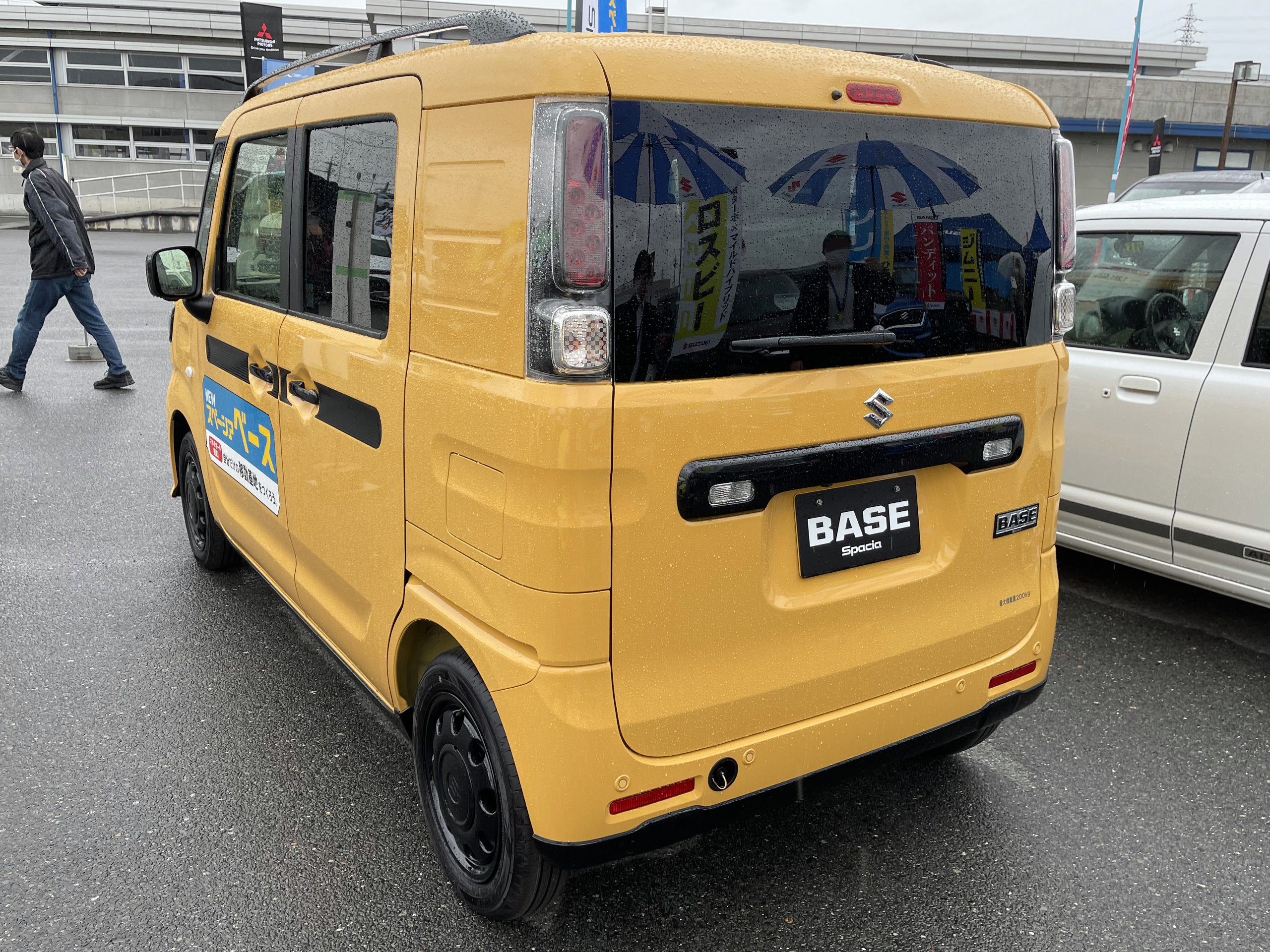
Rear view

== Third generation (MK54S/MK94S; 2023) ==
Third generation
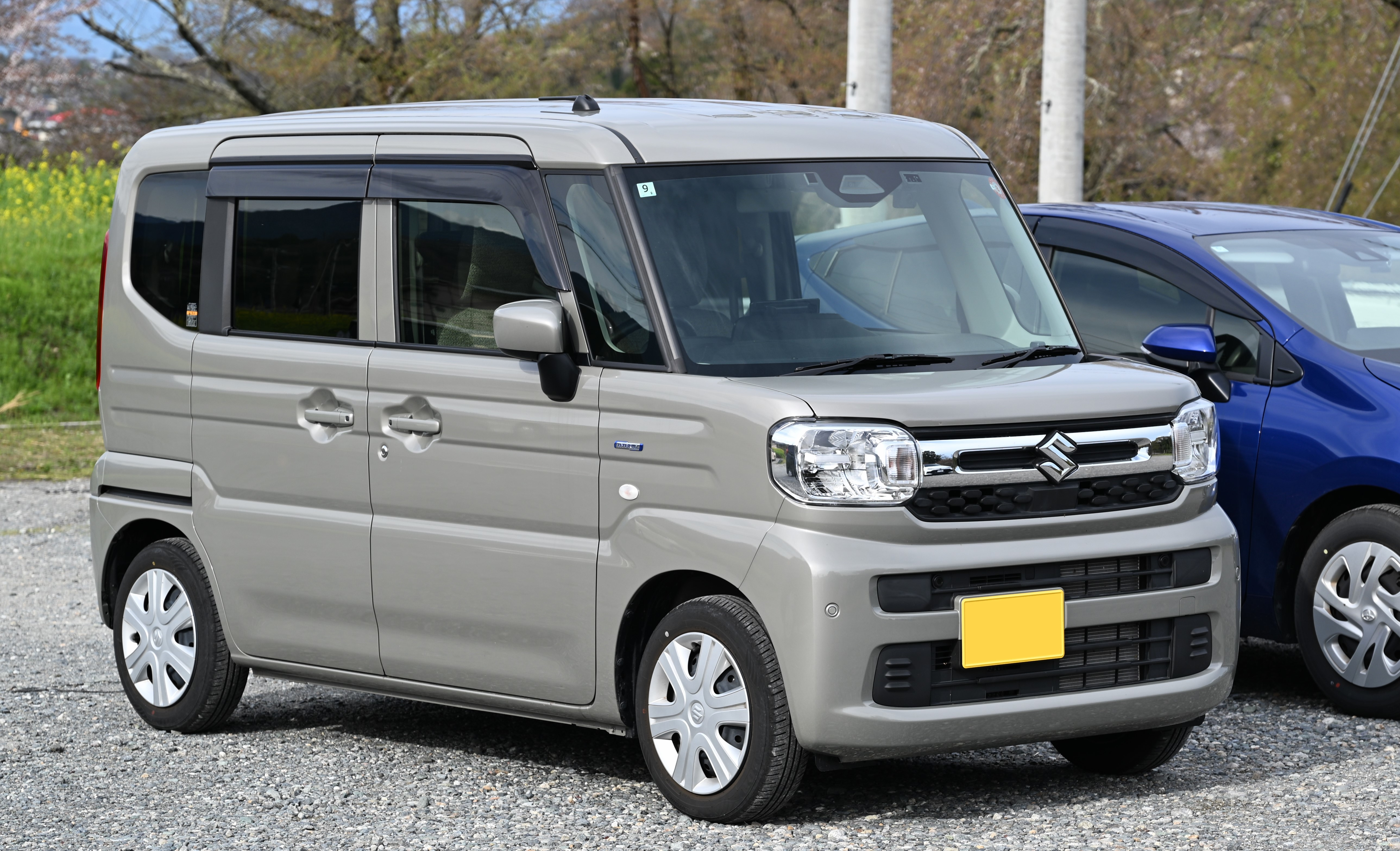
- Spacia Hybrid X

Overview
- Model code: MK54S/MK94S
- Production: November 2023 – present (Spacia/Spacia Custom); September 2024 – present (Spacia Gear)

Body and chassis
- Platform: HEARTECT platform

Powertrain
- Engine: 658cc R06D I3 (MK94S); 658cc R06A turbo I3 (MK54S)
- Electric motor: WA04C/WA05A

Dimensions
- Wheelbase: 2,460 mm (96.9 in)
- Length: 3,395 mm (133.7 in)
- Width: 1,475 mm (58.1 in)
- Height: 1,785 mm (70.3 in)
- Curb weight: 850–960 kg (1,874–2,116 lb)

The third-generation Spacia was unveiled at the 2023 Japan Mobility Show and released on 22 November 2023. The Spacia Gear based on the third-generation Spacia was released on 20 September 2024.

A sporty looking Custom model, with a more aggressive front end and better equipment, was also available. The Mazda Flair Wagon derivative continued to be available as well, as well as Custom and Tough Style variants corresponding to the Spacia Custom and Spacia Gear.

The more rugged Spacia Gear was launched in September 2024. It was offered in sole variant, the Hybrid XZ. The naturally aspirated and turbocharged variant was available.

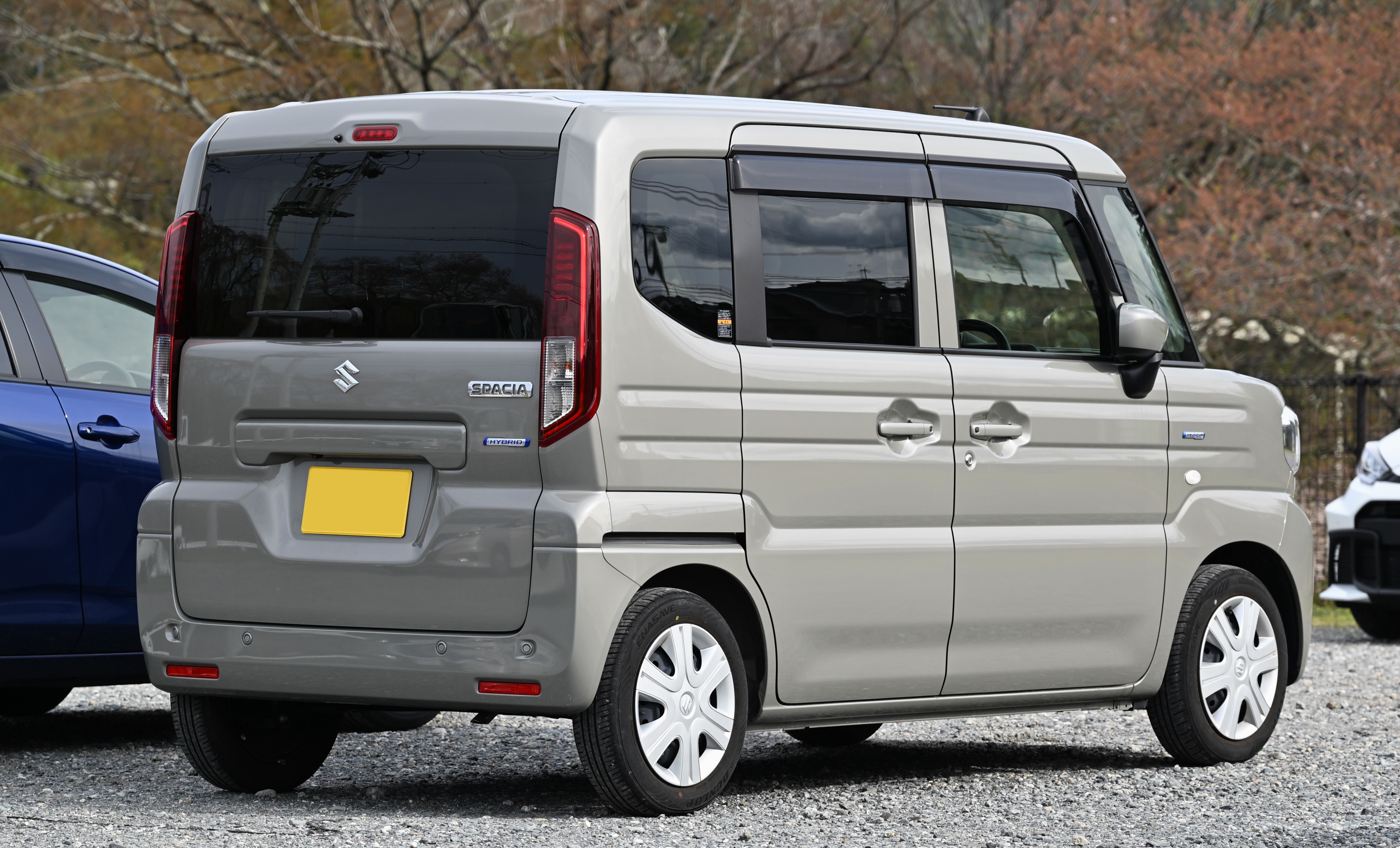
Rear view

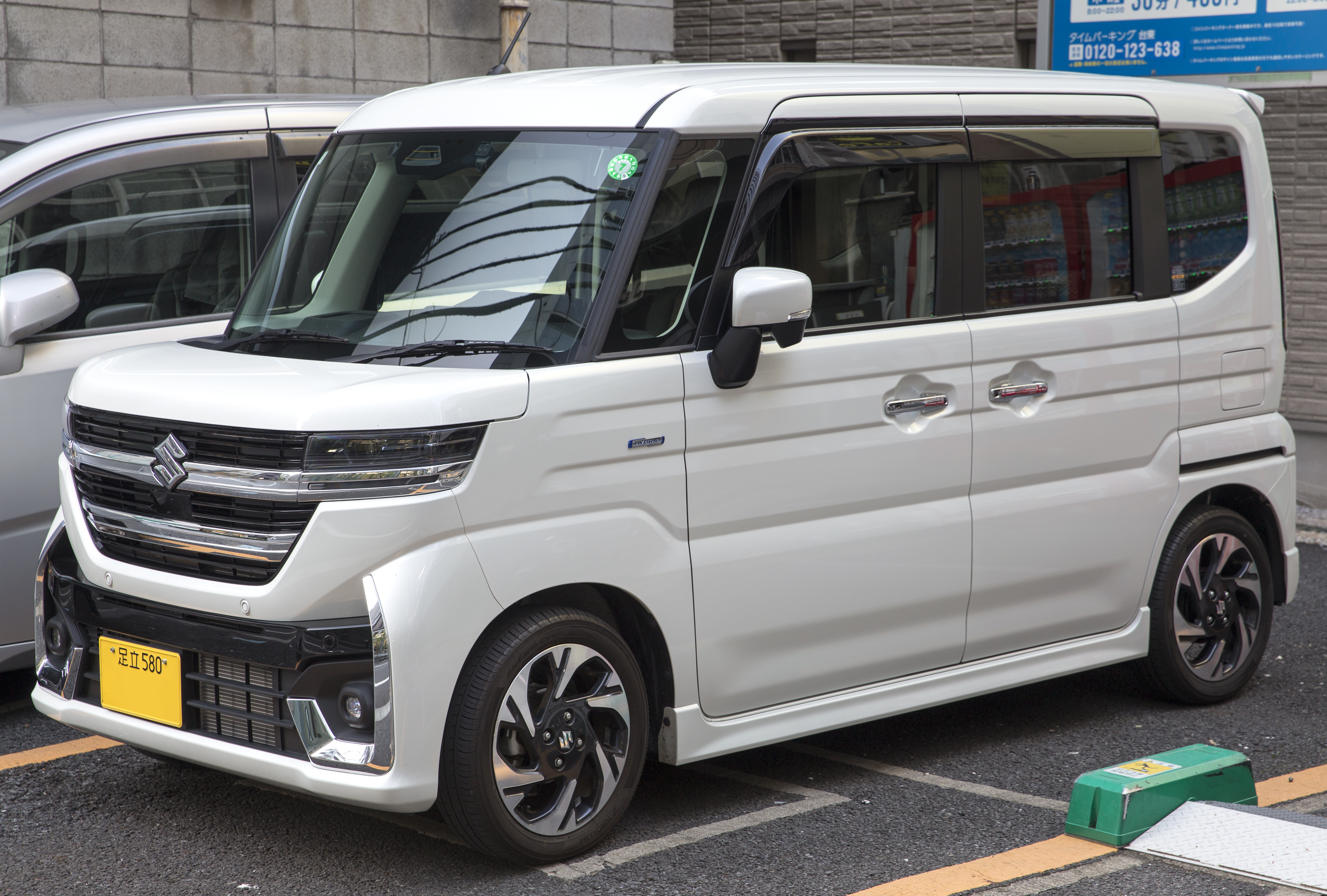
Spacia Custom Hybrid XS

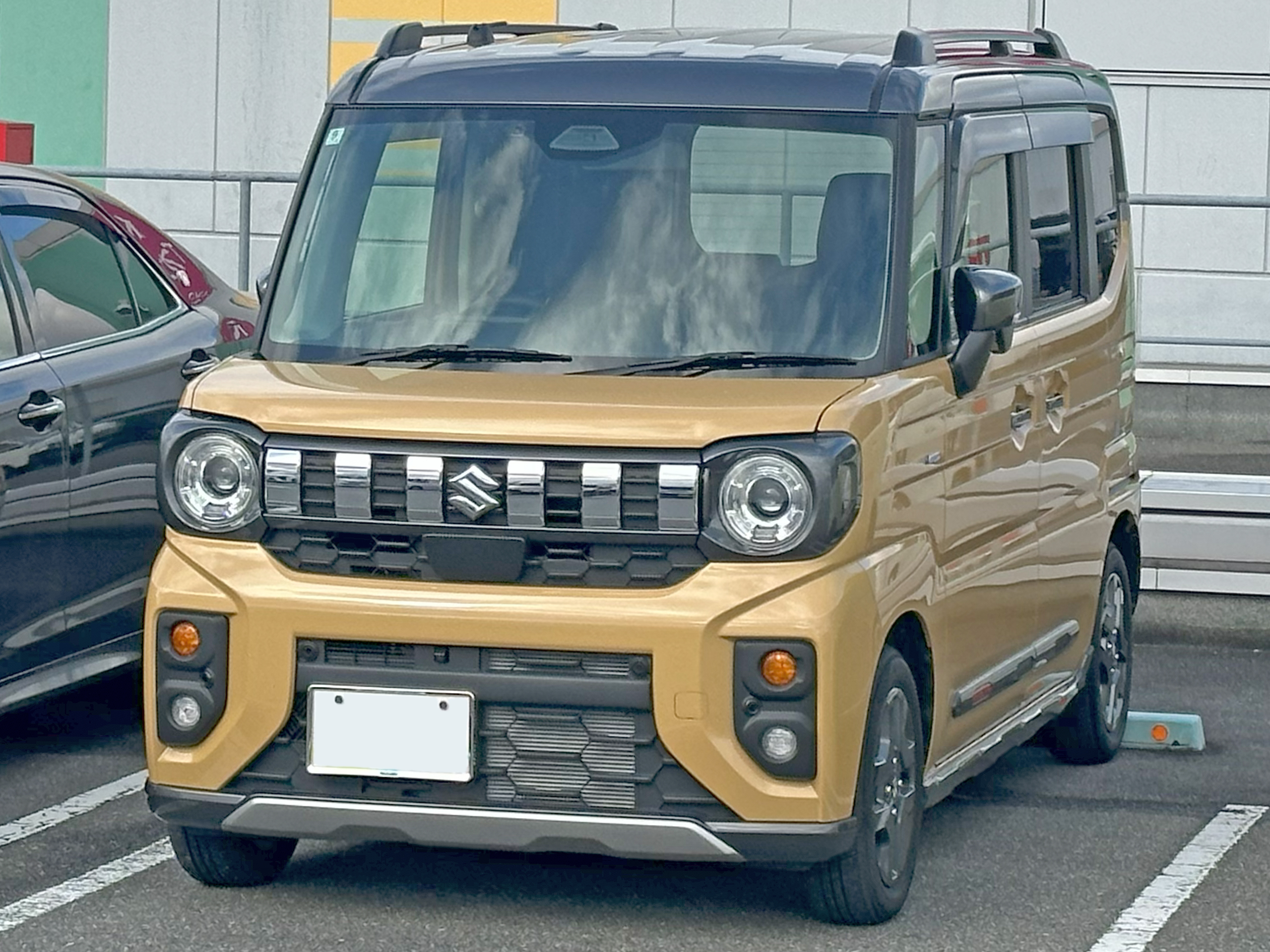
Spacia Gear Hybrid XZ Turbo

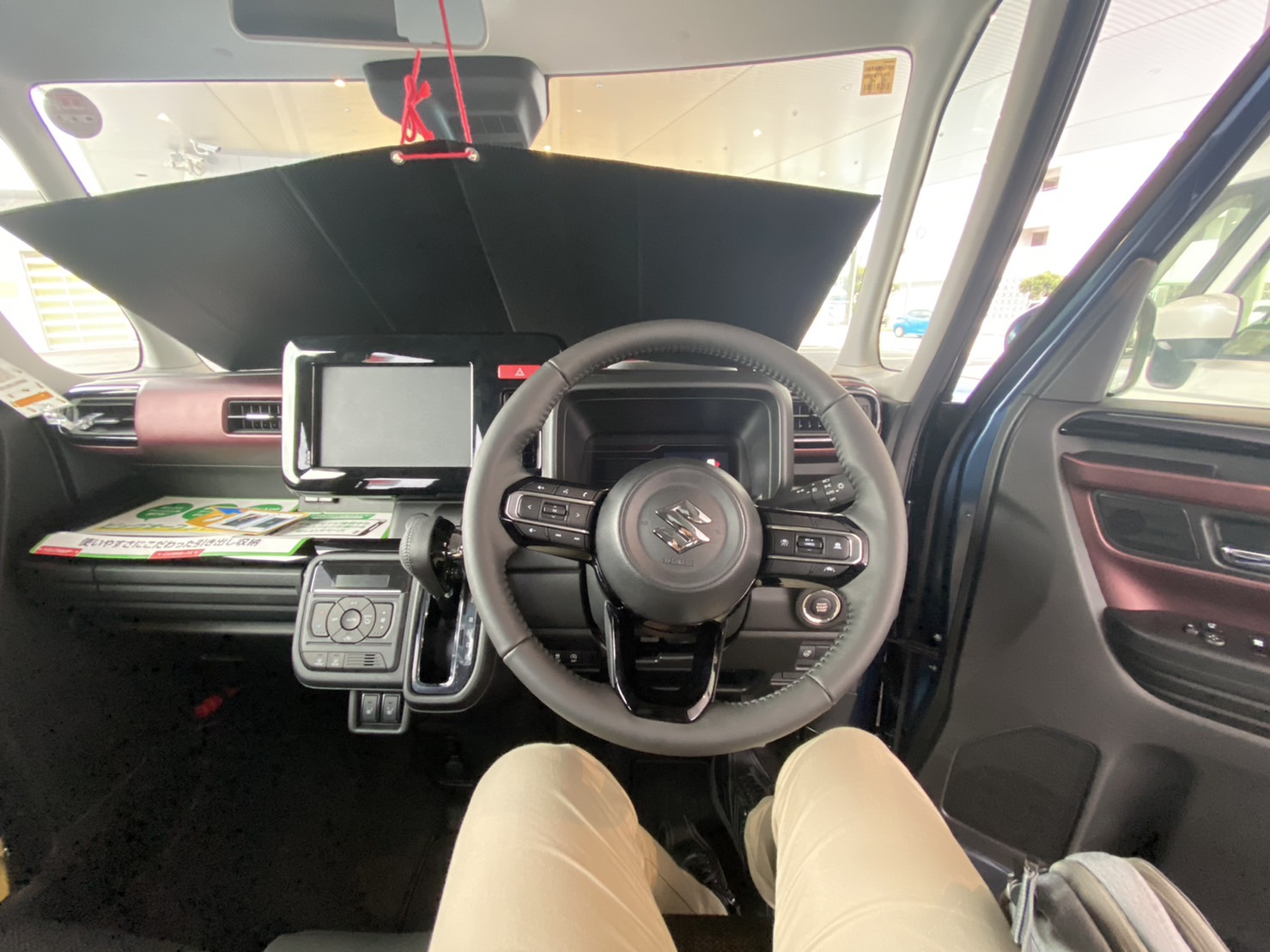
Interior

== Sales ==
Year	Japan	
Year	Spacia	Spacia Base
2013	107,193	
2014	121,086	
2015	79,375	
2016	81,277	
2017	104,763	
2018	152,044	
2019	166,389	
2020	139,851	
2021	128,881	
2022	100,206	6,255
2023	122,275	11,025
2024	165,679	6,582
2025	165,589	4,950
