= Suzuki Palette =

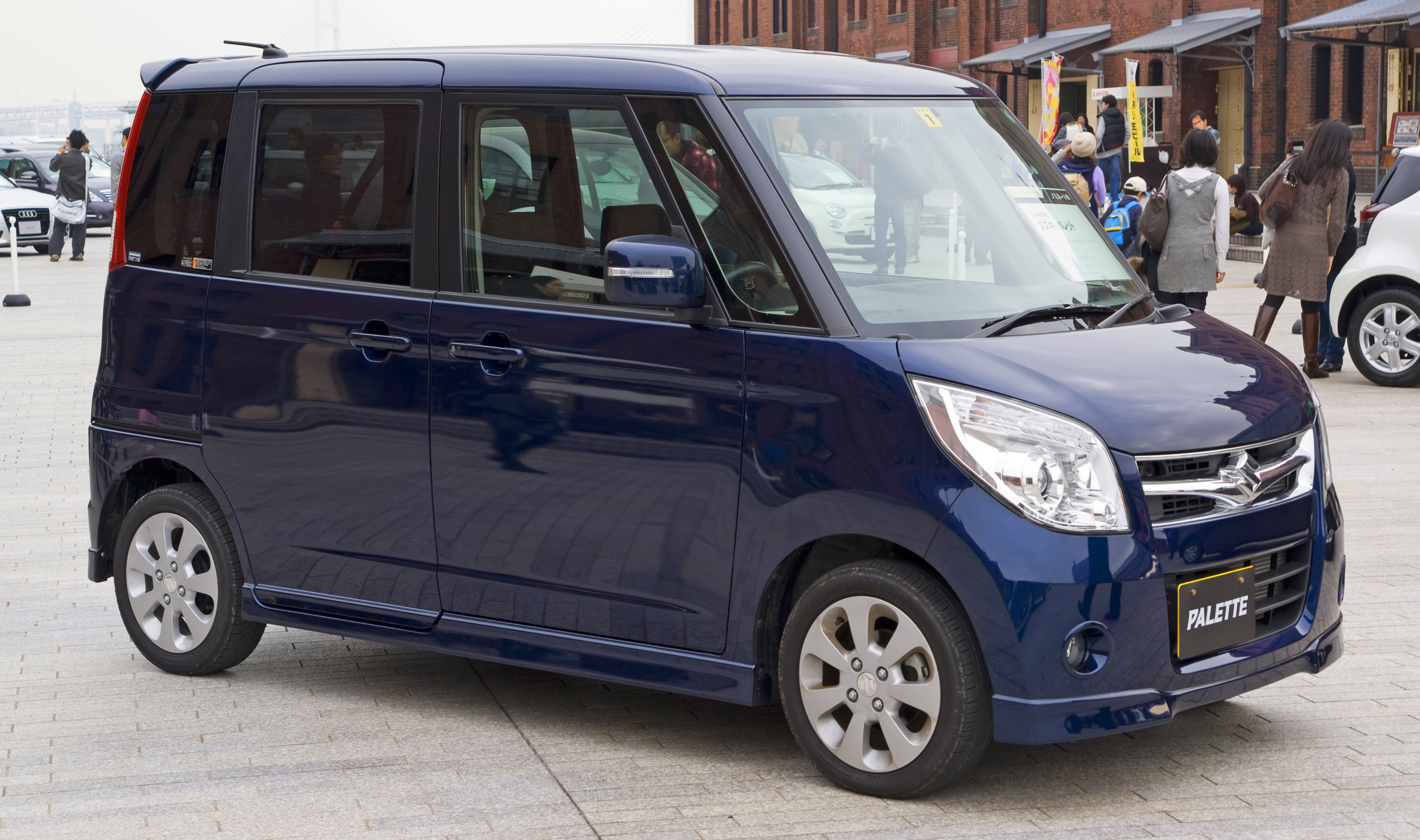

Overview
- Manufacturer: Suzuki
- Model code: MK21S; VA0 (Nissan)
- Also called: Mazda Flair Wagon; Nissan Roox
- Production: 2008–2013
- Assembly: Japan: Kosai, Shizuoka

Body and chassis
- Class: Kei car
- Body style: 5-door hatchback
- Layout: Front-engine, front-wheel-drive; Front-engine, four-wheel-drive
- Related: Suzuki Wagon R

Powertrain
- Engine: 658 cc K6A I3 DOHC 12 valve VVT (naturally aspirated & intercooler turbo)
- Transmission: 4-speed automatic; CVT

Dimensions
- Wheelbase: 2,400 mm (94.5 in)
- Length: 3,395 mm (133.7 in)
- Width: 1,475 mm (58.1 in)
- Height: 1,735 mm (68.3 in)
- Curb weight: 900–900 kg (1,984–1,984 lb)

Chronology
- Successor: Suzuki Spacia; Nissan Dayz Roox

The Suzuki Palette (Japanese: スズキ・パレット, Hepburn: Suzuki Paretto) is a kei car produced by Suzuki from January 2008 to February 2013. The Suzuki Palette has twin rear sliding doors, and competes directly with the Daihatsu Tanto.

The Palette was replaced in February 2013 by the Suzuki Spacia, with a corresponding new Mazda Flair Wagon launched simultaneously. The Nissan Roox was discontinued and replaced by the Nissan Dayz Roox, a new model designed with Mitsubishi Motors. In 2020, the Roox nameplate returned as the replacement of Dayz Roox. The newer Roox is based on the second generation eK Space.

== Overview ==
The Palette first unveiled at the 40th Tokyo Motor Show as the prototype model. This car was announced by Suzuki to compete with the Daihatsu Tanto, which had pioneered a new genre of "kei tall wagon" and achieved success before. It featured a new platform boasting a 2,400mm wheelbase, and was the first bonnet-type kei car to have sliding doors on both sides of the rear seats (except the "TS" grade which had electrically sliding doors).

The Palette was launched on 24 Januarh 2008, and sales commenced in 30 January 2008. The grade levels are XS, X, and G for naturally aspirated engines, and TS and T for intercooled turbo engines. The XS, TS, and T trims come standard with aero parts, fog lamps, 14-inch alloy wheels, and a tachometer. The XS grade is only available in front-wheel drive, while the other trims offer both FF and full-time four-wheel drive options.

All grades were powered by a K6A engine DOHC 12-valve VVT natural aspirated engine installed in the Palette G, X, and XS models is a practical engine with a maximum output of 54 PS (40 kW; 53 hp), which the turbo models with a maximun output of 54 PS (40 kW; 53 hp).

In 2009 along with improvments, a derivative model called "Palette SW" was added, featuring a distinctive front end combining translucent headlamp garnish and a large lower grille, reminiscent of the Wagon R Stingray, as well as fully-redesigned front fascia and grille, integrated front and rear aero bumpers, smoked rear combination lamps, and specially designed aluminium wheels. The Palette SW lineup consists of three grades: GS and XS grades with a naturally aspirated engine, and TS with a turbo engine. The GS has a 4-speed automatic transmission, and the XS and TS grades are equipped with a CVT. It was laterly adopted in badge-engineered version Roox Highway Star with sligthly redesigned front fascia. It was features a revised frontal design is positioned to better compete with the Daihatsu Tanto Custom. Since the addition of the SW, the Suzuki Palette range has generally performed well in the sales charts.

In mid-2010 the 4-speed automatic was discontinued, and CVT transmission is standard for all models.

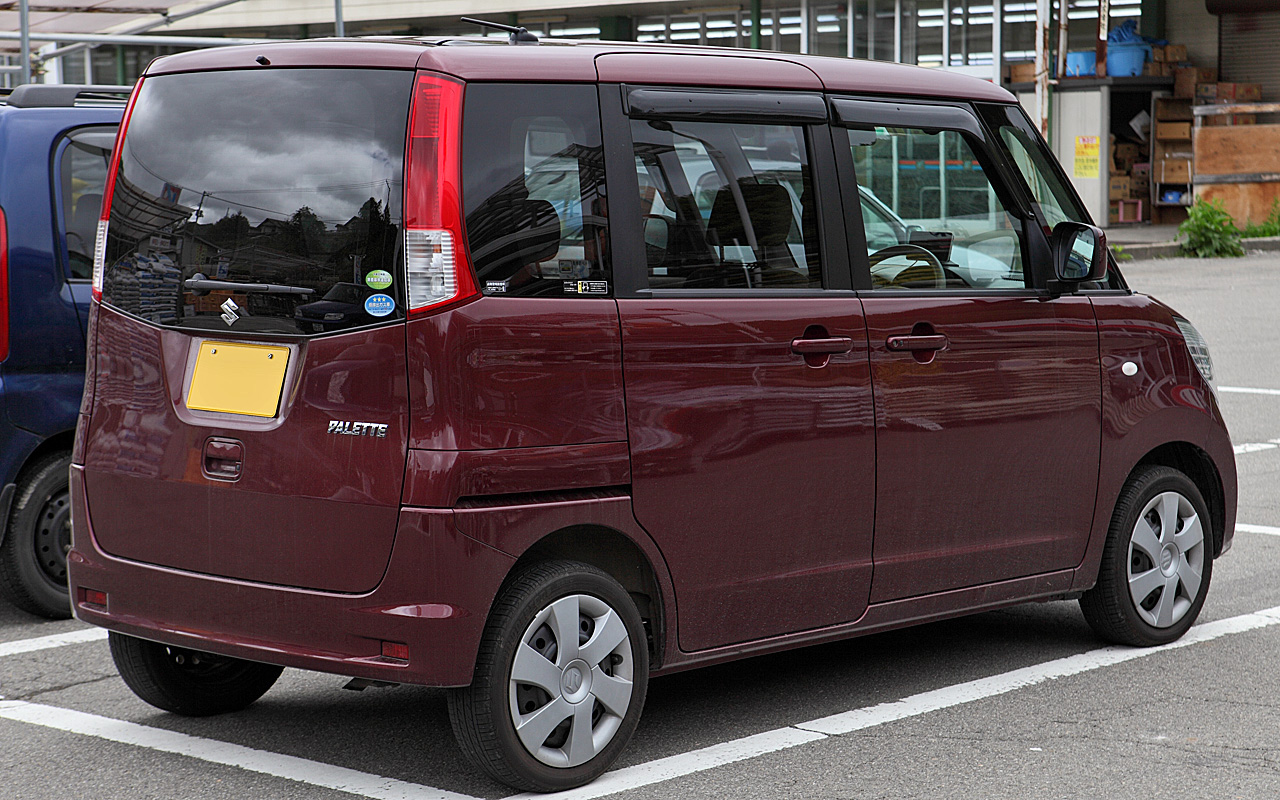
Rear view

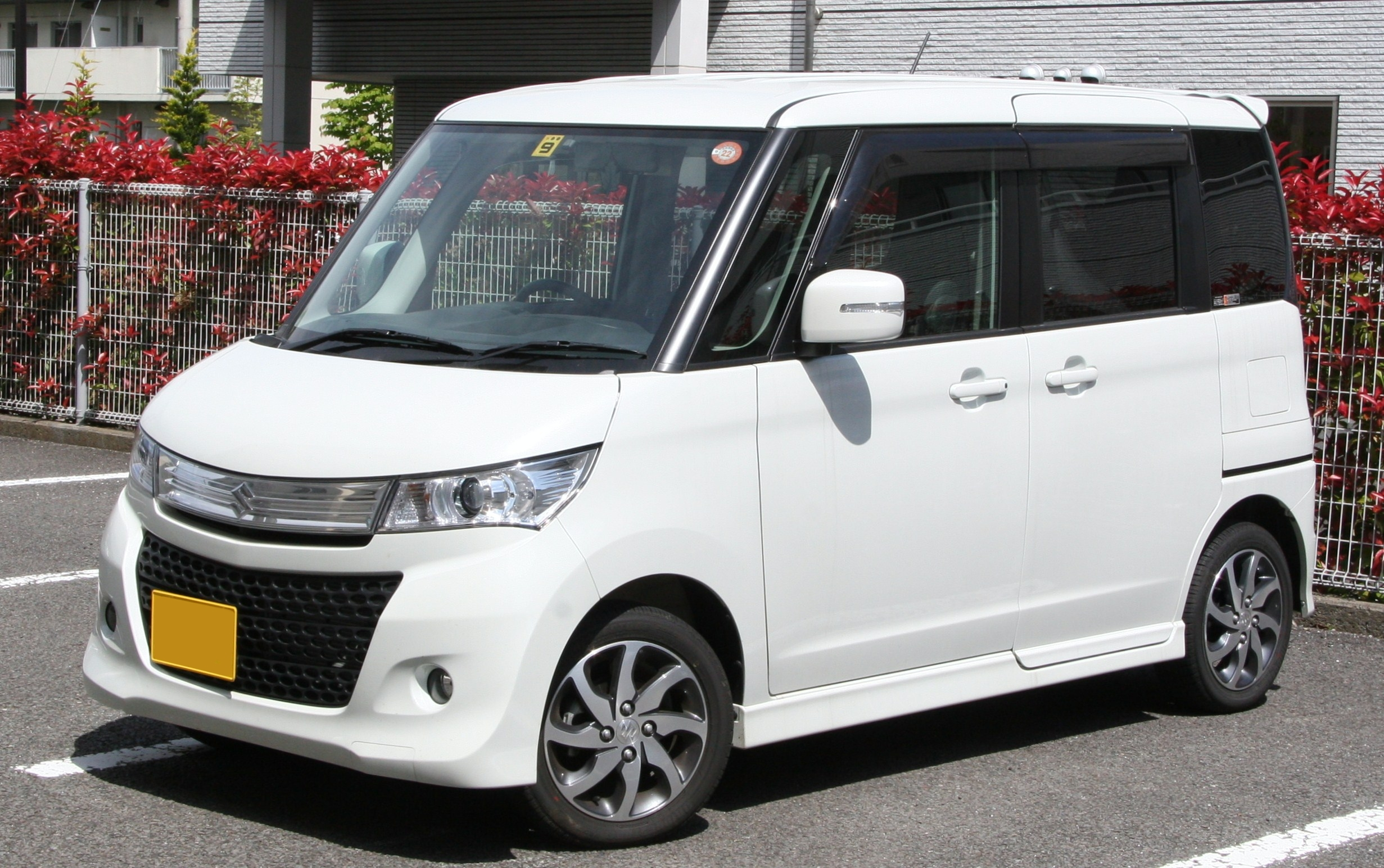
Suzuki Palette SW

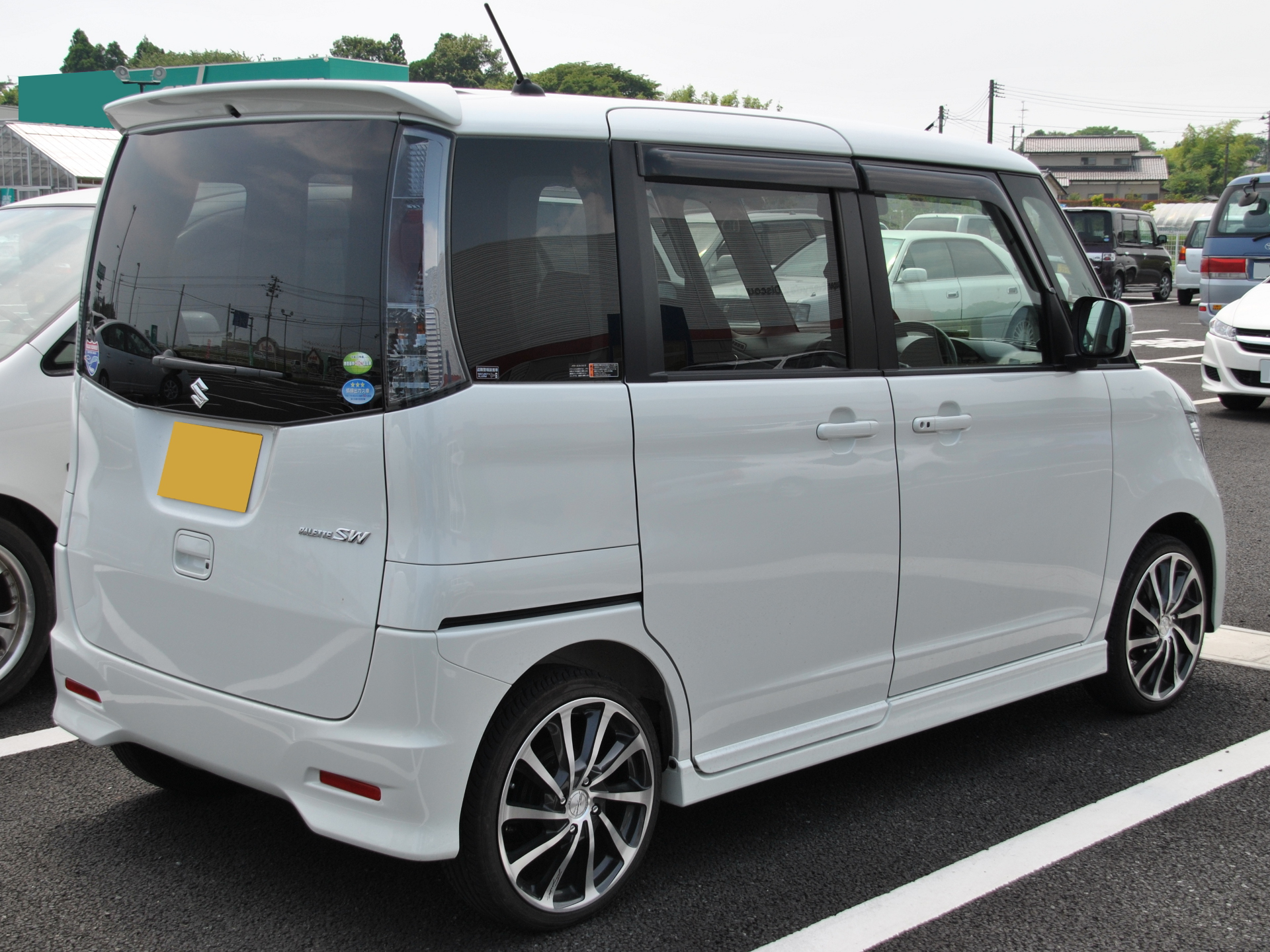
Suzuki Palette SW

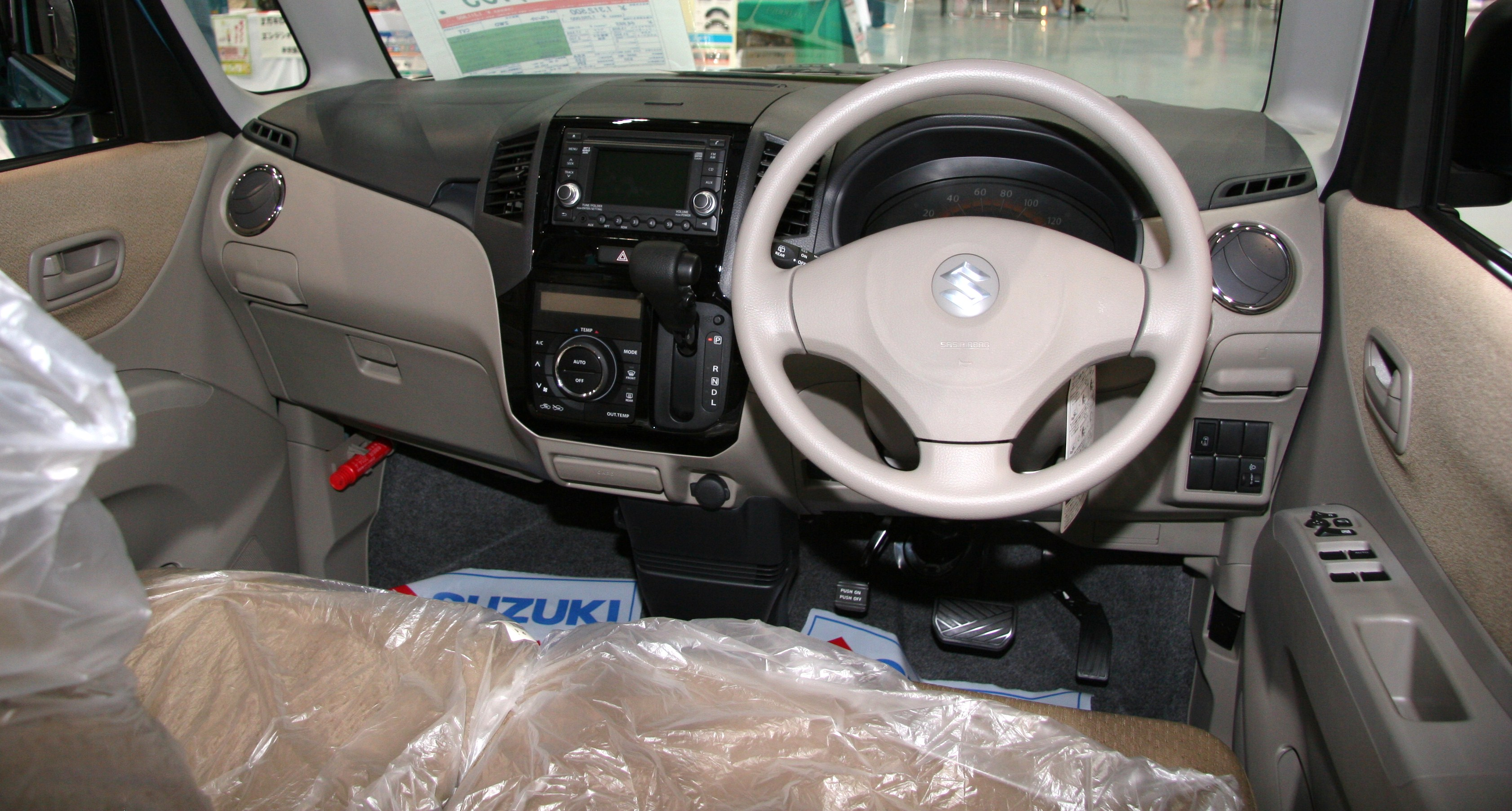
2010 Suzuki Palette X interior

== Rebadged versions ==
=== Nissan Roox ===
On 1 December 2009, an OEM version of the Suzuki was released, called the Nissan Roox. Previously it was unveiled at the 2009 Tokyo Motor Show as a prototype. Similar to the Palette, it was features a slightly redesign front fascia.

It was discontinued in Early 2013. As for the successor model, NMKV announced on 25 March of the same year that it was developing the Dayz Roox, and adopts the Mitsubishi eK Space design. As a result Nissan no longer uses OEM designs from Suzuki.

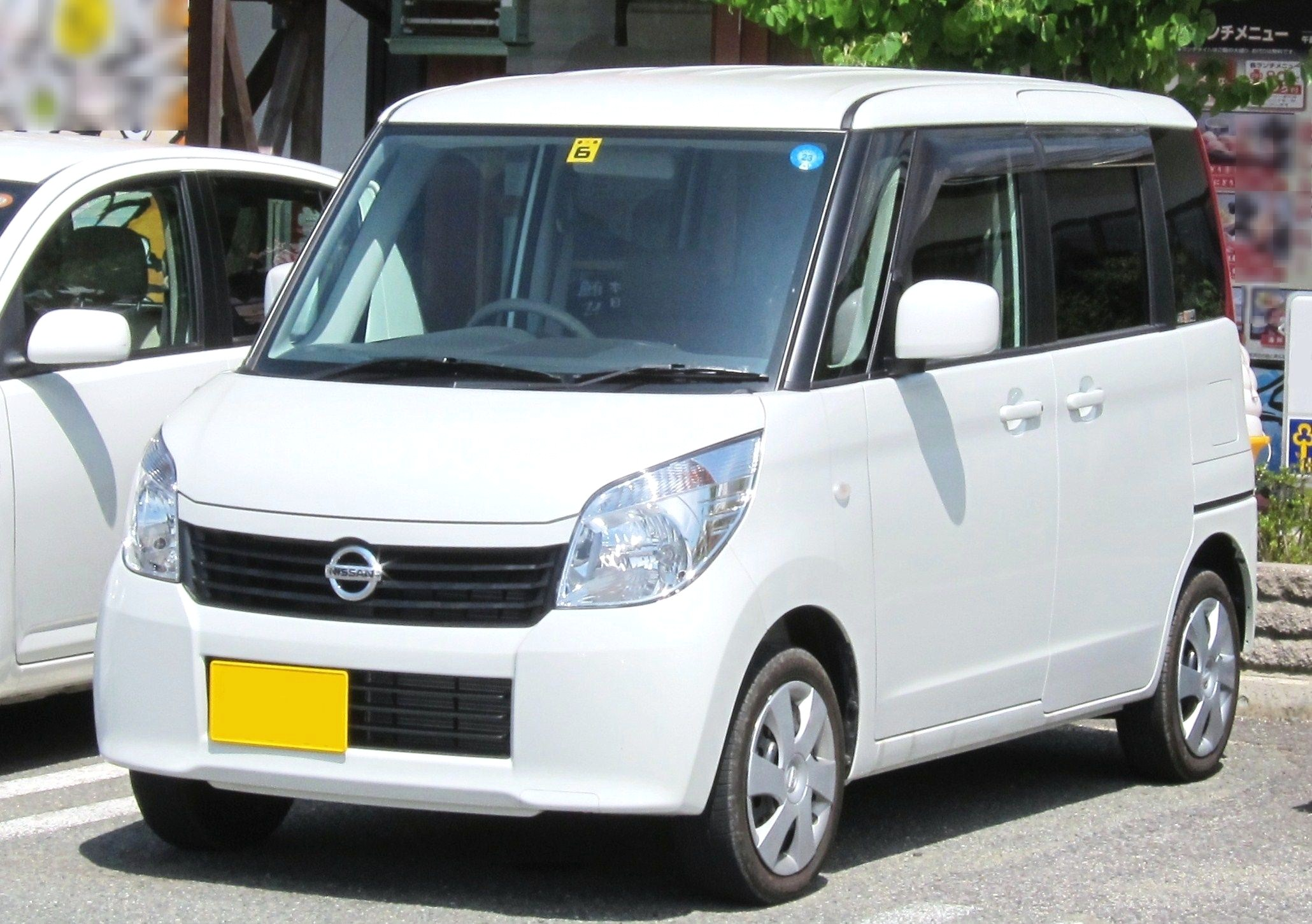
Nissan Roox

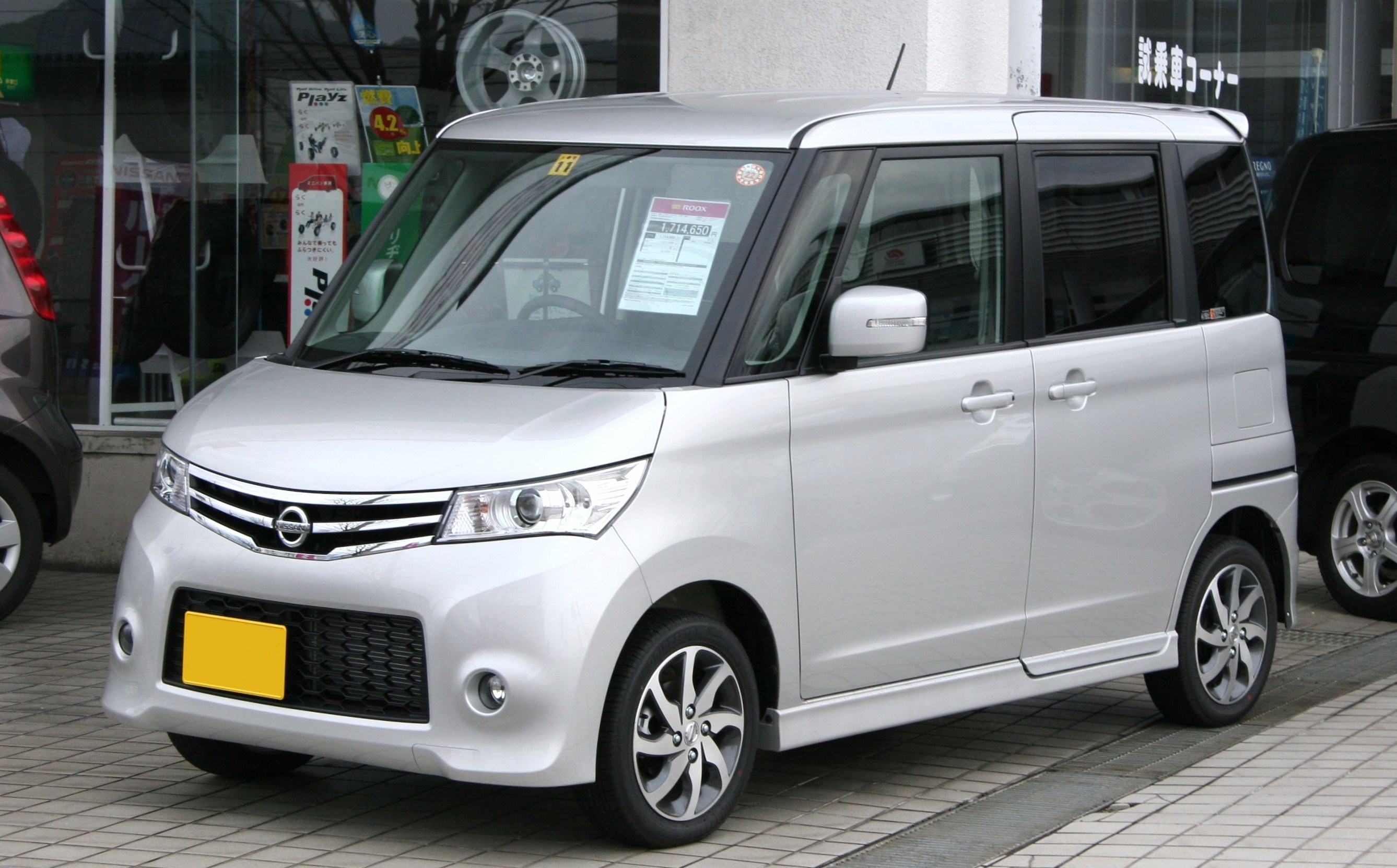
Nissan Roox Highway Star

=== Mazda Flair Wagon ===
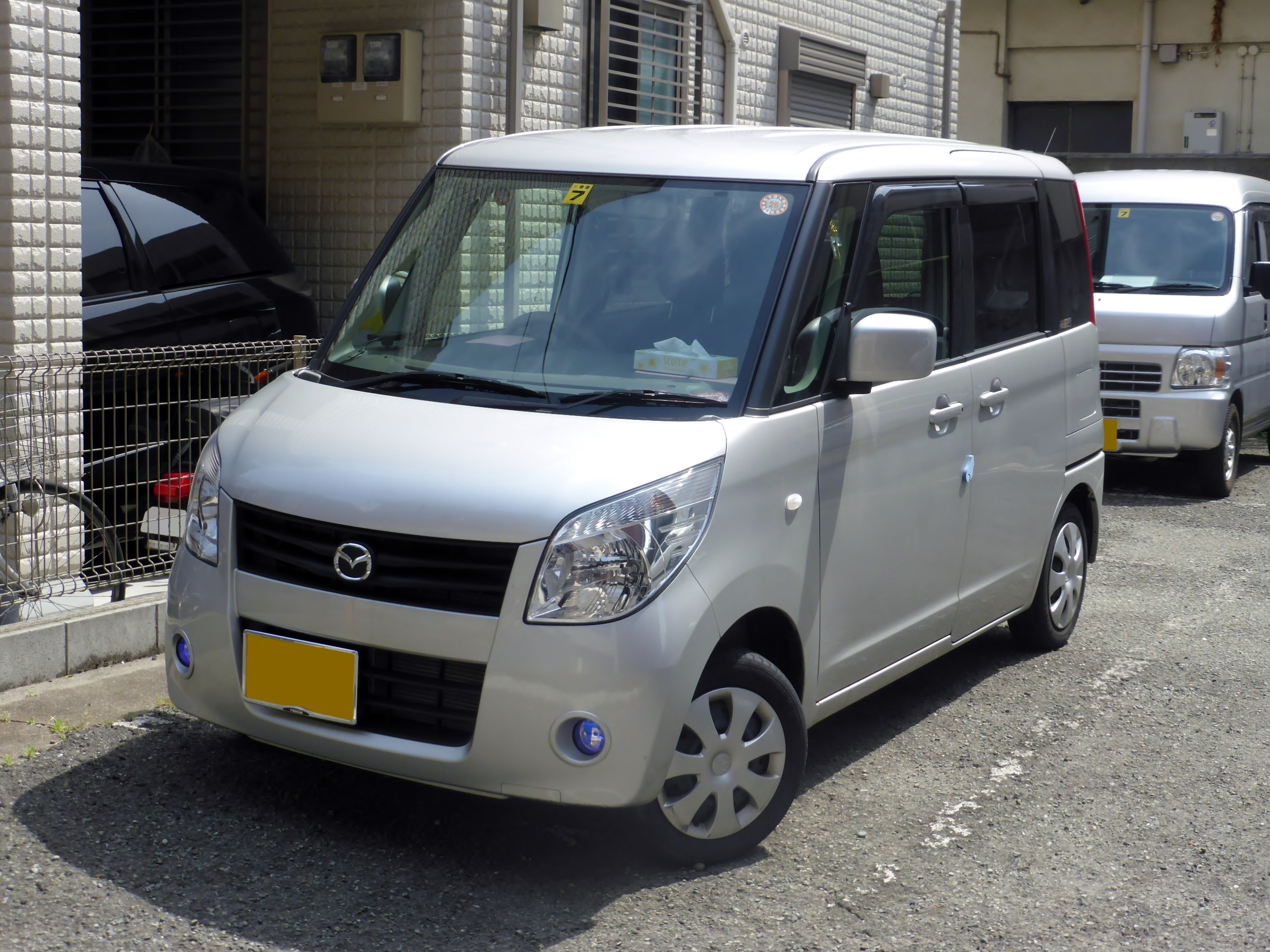
Mazda Flair Wagon

A short-lived Flair Wagon was released on 26 June 2012. Unlike the both Palette and Roox, the sportier model was not offered in Flair Wagon.

It was discontinued in 2013. The Flair Wagon nameplate was retained in subsequent model.
