= Suzuki R engine =

Internal combustion engine found in kei cars

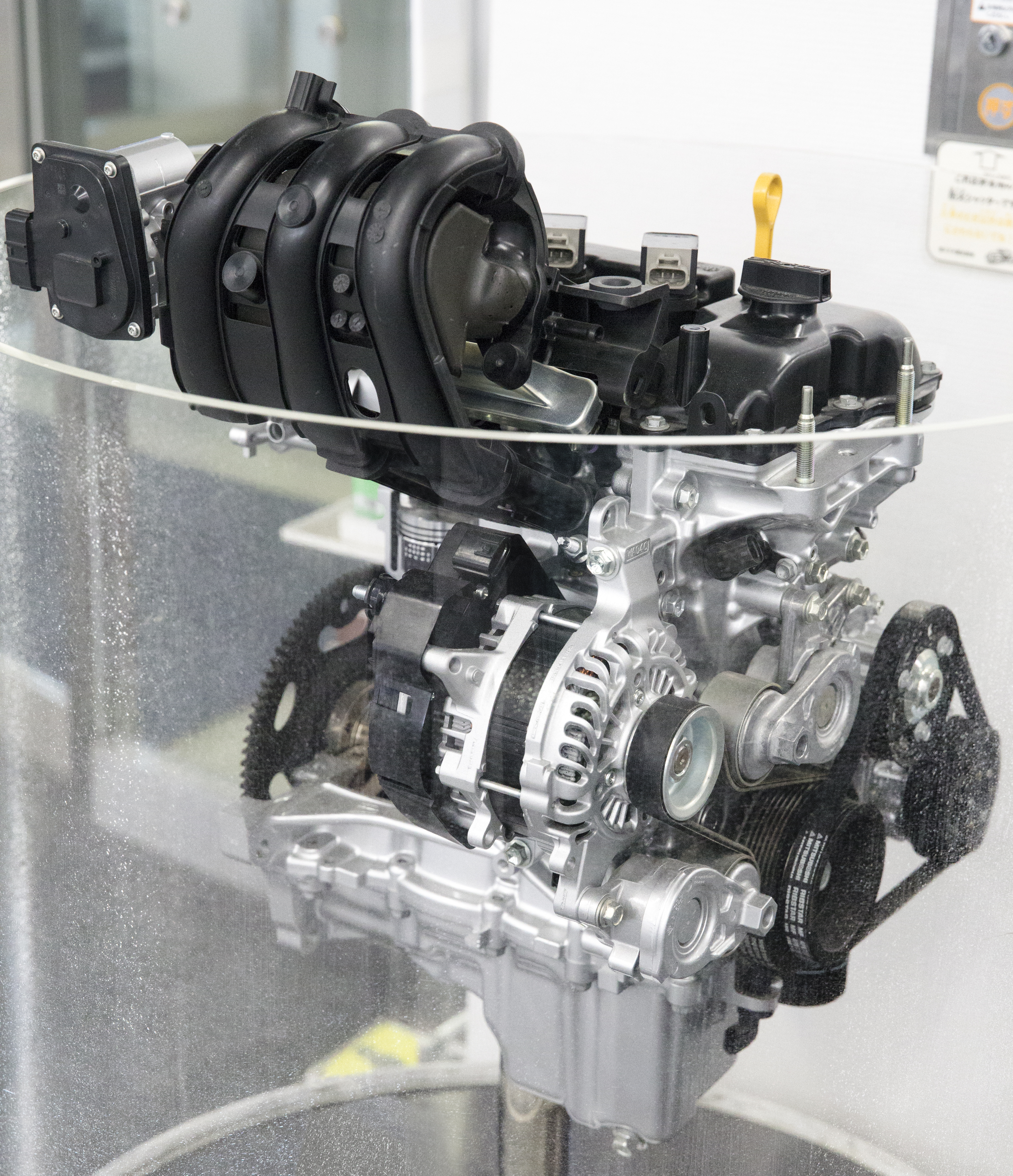
- R06D engine

Overview
- Manufacturer: Suzuki
- Production: 2011-present

Layout
- Configuration: Inline-three engine
- Displacement: R06A: 658.2 cc (40.2 cu in); R06D: 657.7 cc (40.1 cu in)
- Cylinder bore: 64.0 mm (2.52 in); 61.5 mm (2.42 in)
- Piston stroke: 68.2 mm (2.69 in); 73.8 mm (2.91 in)
- Cylinder block material: Aluminium
- Cylinder head material: Aluminium
- Valvetrain: DOHC 4 valves per cylinder with VVT
- Valvetrain drive system: Timing Chain
- Compression ratio: 9.0:1-12.0:1

Combustion
- Turbocharger: IHI VZ65 Turbo
- Fuel system: Multi-port fuel injection
- Fuel type: Petrol
- Oil system: Wet sump
- Cooling system: Water-cooled

Output
- Power output: 49–85 PS (48–84 hp; 36–63 kW)
- Torque output: 58–100 N⋅m (6–10 kg⋅m; 43–74 lb⋅ft)

Chronology
- Predecessor: Suzuki K engine (K6A)

The Suzuki R engine is an inline-three engine that has been produced by Suzuki since 2011. Initially introduced in the third-generation MR Wagon, and intended as a replacement for the K6A engine, the R engine has since been used in various Suzuki's, such as the Alto, the Wagon R, and the Carry.

== Overview ==
For the release of the third-generation MR Wagon in 2011, Suzuki introduced a brand-new 658.2 cc (40.2 cu in) inline-three petrol engine. The new engine, known as the R06A, was available in naturally-aspirated and turbocharged forms, which produced 54 and 64 PS (40 and 47 kW) respectively. Introduced as a replacement to the K6A that had been in production since 1994, the R06A features four valves per cylinder (for a total of 12), dual overhead camshafts, with a bore and stroke of 64.0 and 68.2 mm (2.52 and 2.69 in) respectively. In addition, the size and weight of the engine were reduced by adopting a cylinder head integrated into the exhaust manifold and a simpler catalyst case structure. While this is good for fuel economy and emissions, the exhaust is more restricted which lowers horsepower and power potential. The naturally-aspirated versions of the R06A feature variable valve timing (VVT) on both the intake and exhaust valves (the first Suzuki engine to do so), and VVT on the intake valves of the turbocharged models.

For 2012, Suzuki added the naturally-aspirated version of the engine to the Alto's range, with R06A-equipped Altos being called the Alto Eco. The Wagon R also received both forms of the R06A engine in 2012, to coincide with the release of the fifth-generation model. In 2013, the R06A was used for the new Suzuki Spacia and the updated Suzuki Carry, and in 2014, it was used for the new Suzuki Hustler. The Carry was the first vehicle to use the R06A engine in a rear-wheel-drive configuration, and had a slightly detuned 50 PS (37 kW) version of the engine.

In December 2019, Suzuki introduced a new version of the R engine for the 2020 model Suzuki Wagon R and second-generation Suzuki Hustler. It's a naturally aspirated 657.7 cc (40.1 cu in) inline-three petrol engine, known as the R06D - the engine dimensions are different but the overall displacement is only 0.5 cc less than that of the R06A. Only available in naturally-aspirated form, it produces 49 PS (36 kW).

== R06A ==
The R06A is a 658 cc inline three DOHC 12 valve engine with VVT. Available in naturally aspirated or turbocharged. Bore x stroke is 64.0mm x 68.2mm. Compression ratios are 9.1:1 (turbo) and 11.0-11.5:1 (NA). Output is between 49 and 54 PS (36 and 40 kW) at 5700-6500 rpm with 58–63 N⋅m (43–46 lb⋅ft) of torque at 3500-4000 rpm for the naturally aspirated variants and 64 PS (47 kW) at 6000 rpm with 95–100 N⋅m (70–74 lb⋅ft) at 3000 rpm of torque for the turbocharged variants. The R06A can come paired with Suzuki's mild hybrid system, with the W05A electric motor (3.1 PS and 50 Nm) and a 10Ah battery.

=== Applications ===
Naturally-aspirated

- 2011–2016: Suzuki MR Wagon/Nissan Moco
- 2012–2020: Suzuki Wagon R/Mazda Flair
- 2012–present: Suzuki Alto/Mazda Carol
- 2013–present: Suzuki Carry/Mazda Scrum/Nissan NT100 Clipper/Mitsubishi Minicab
- 2013–2023: Suzuki Spacia/Mazda Flair Wagon
- 2014–2020: Suzuki Hustler/Mazda Flair Crossover
- 2015–present: Suzuki Every/Mazda Scrum/Nissan NV100 Clipper/Mitsubishi Minicab

Turbocharged

- 2011–2016: Suzuki MR Wagon/Nissan Moco
- 2012–present: Suzuki Wagon R/Mazda Flair
- 2013–present: Suzuki Spacia/Mazda Flair Wagon
- 2014–2021: Suzuki Alto/Mazda Carol
- 2014–present: Suzuki Hustler/Mazda Flair Crossover
- 2015–present: Suzuki Every/Mazda Scrum/Nissan NV100 Clipper/Mitsubishi Minicab/Mitsubishi Town Box
- 2018–present: Suzuki Jimny
- 2021–present Caterham Seven 170 (tuned to 85 PS & 116 Nm)

== R06D ==
The R06D is a naturally aspirated 658 cc inline three DOHC 12 valve engine with VVT. Bore x stroke is 61.5mm x 73.8mm. Compression ratio is 12.0:1. Output is 49 PS (36 kW) at 6500 rpm with 58 N⋅m (43 lb⋅ft) of torque at 5000 rpm. This engine can also come in a mild hybrid configuration, but with the slightly less powerful W04C electric motor (2.6 PS and 40 N.m) and a lower capacity 3Ah battery.

=== Applications ===
- 2020–present: Suzuki Hustler/Mazda Flair Crossover
- 2020–present: Suzuki Wagon R/Mazda Flair
- 2021–present: Suzuki Alto Hybrid
- 2021–present: Suzuki Wagon R Smile
- 2023–present: Suzuki Spacia/Mazda Flair Wagon
