= Suzuki Alto =

Kei car manufactured by Suzuki

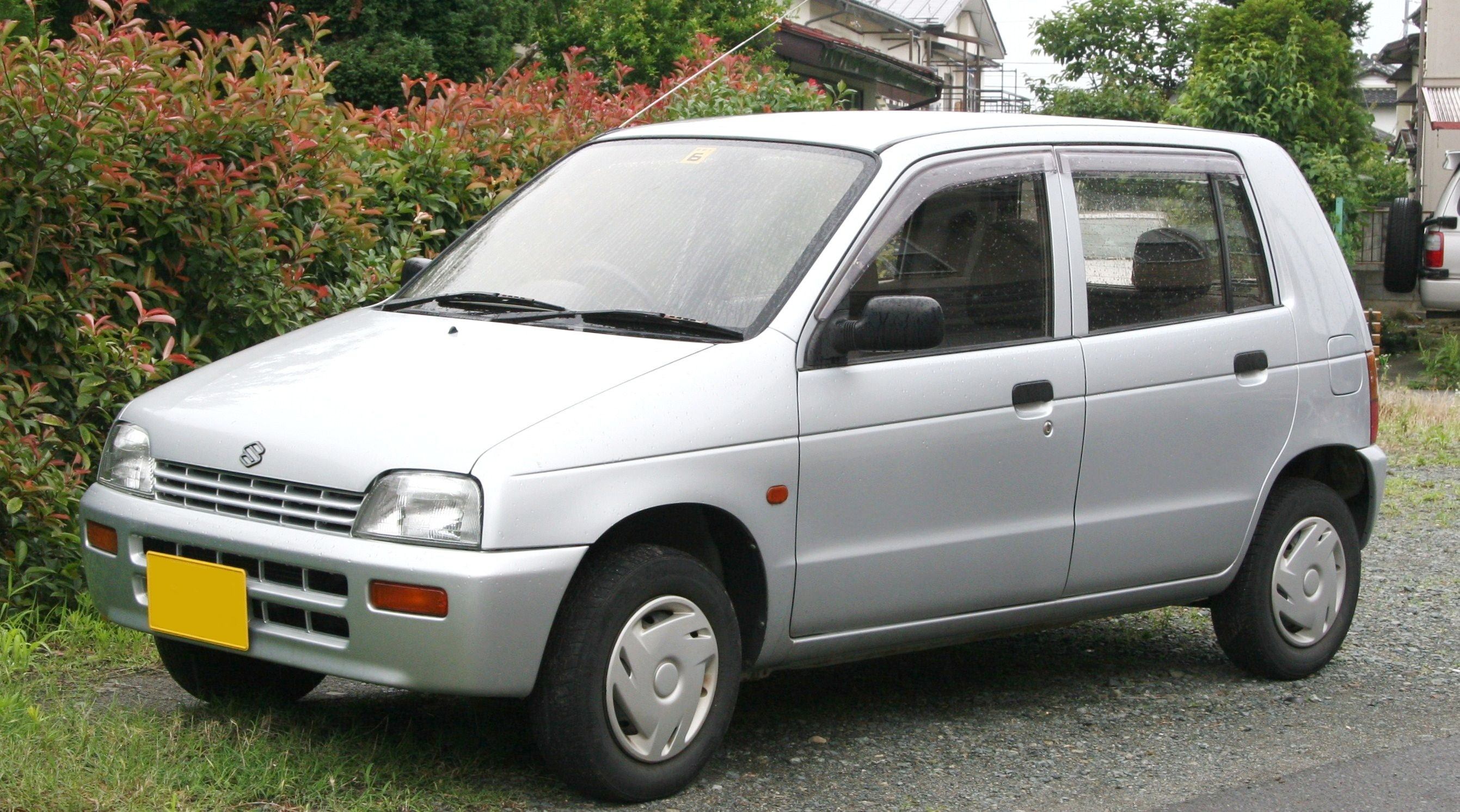
- Suzuki Alto 4th generation (1994–1998)

Overview
- Manufacturer: Suzuki
- Also called: Suzuki Cervo Mode; Suzuki Fronte; Suzuki Mehran; Maruti 800; Maruti A-Star
- Production: 1979–present

Body and chassis
- Class: Kei car (Japan); City car (A) (international)
- Body style: 3/5-door hatchback; 3-door van
- Layout: Front-engine, front-wheel-drive; Front-engine, four-wheel-drive

The Suzuki Alto (Japanese: スズキ・アルト, Hepburn: Suzuki Aruto) is a kei car produced by Suzuki since 1979. The model, currently in its ninth generation, was first introduced in 1979 and has been built in many countries worldwide. The Alto originated as a commercial vehicle derivative of the Fronte, but over time the Alto nameplate gained in popularity and by 1988 it replaced the Fronte name completely. The Alto badge has often been used on different cars in Japan and in export markets, where it is considered a city car.

== Nameplate history ==
In Japan, the Alto badge was originally meant to be for the commercial use version of the Fronte passenger car. The word "alto" is a musical term. When introduced, the Alto was only available as a three-door "light van" and with bare-bones equipment. However, Suzuki generally did not use the "Fronte" badge in export, usually calling all versions "Alto" abroad. Most early export Altos were thus technically speaking rebadged Suzuki Frontes. These were exported with changes such as enlarged engines, sometimes modified bodywork. Thus the Japanese SS40 Fronte became the SS80 Alto with a 660 cc engine abroad. The Alto badge gradually took over in Japan as well, as the distinction between kei commercial vehicles and passenger cars was diminished in early 1989. The Fronte line was retired in March 1989. The Alto plate has been used on export versions of various Indian-built derivatives since the early 1990s, as neither cars are restricted by the kei rules and Indian cars are also considerably cheaper than Japanese-built ones.

Thus, the European-market models were actually:

- 1981–1984: SS40 Fronte with a 40 PS (29 kW) 796 cc three-cylinder engine (SS80F/G).
- 1984–1994: CA/CB91 Alto/Fronte (also referred to as SB308) with the same 40 PS (29 kW) F8B engine as the SS80.
- March 1994–2002: Maruti Zen (a wider version of the Suzuki Cervo Mode), with a 993 cc engine.
- 2002–2009: Maruti Suzuki Alto (based on the HA12 Alto), with a 1061 cc four-cylinder engine. Sold until 2012 in other markets.
- 2009–2014: Maruti Suzuki A-Star, with a 998 cc engine.

In 2014, the Suzuki Celerio replaced the Alto in Europe and many other export markets. Outside of the Japanese domestic market, the Alto badge remains used on the second generation of Indian-built Maruti Altos which is generally sold as a Suzuki in export markets.

== First generation (1979) ==
First generation
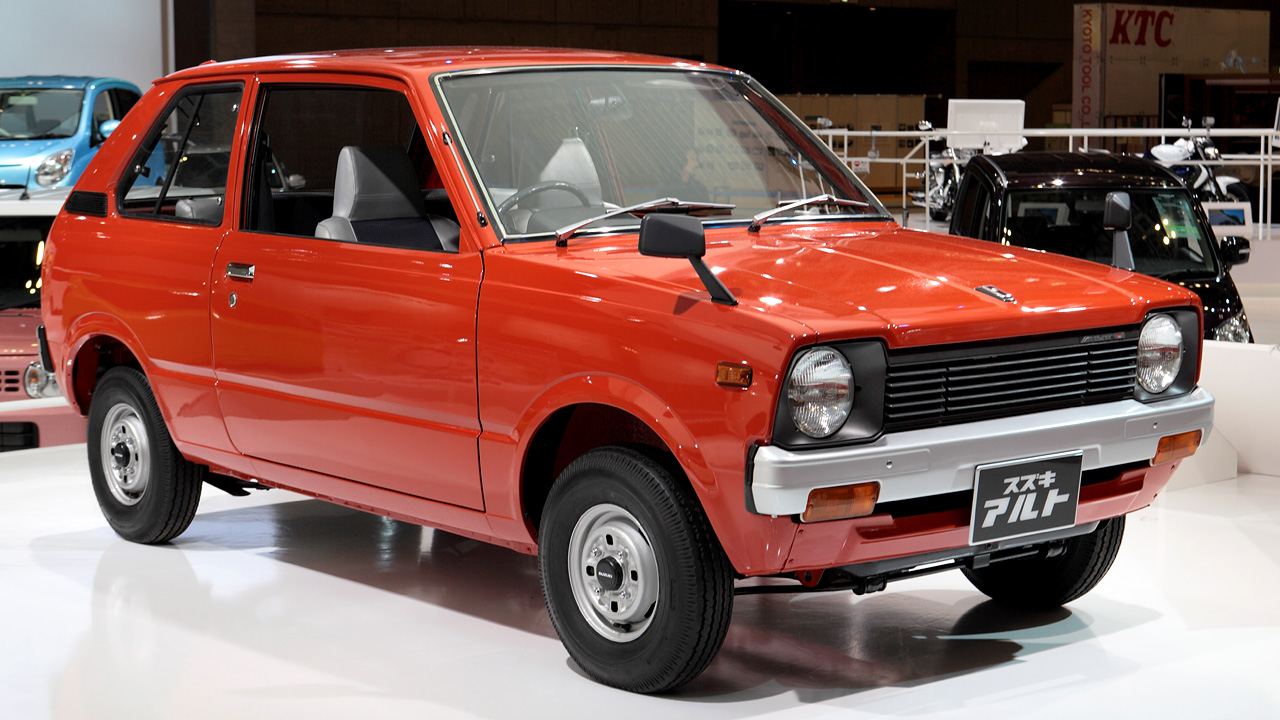

Overview
- Model code: SS30/SS40
- Also called: Suzuki Fronte; Suzuki FX; Suzuki Hatch; Maruti 800
- Production: 1979–1984
- Assembly: Japan: Kosai, Shizuoka; New Zealand: Whanganui (South Pacific Suzuki); Pakistan: Karachi (Pak Suzuki Motors)

Body and chassis
- Body style: 3/5-door hatchback 3-door van
- Layout: Front-engine, front-wheel-drive or four-wheel-drive

Powertrain
- Engine: 539 cc T5B two-stroke I3 (SS30); 543 cc F5A I3 (SS40); 796 cc F8B I3 (SS80, export only)
- Transmission: 4-speed manual

Dimensions
- Wheelbase: 2,150 mm (84.6 in)
- Length: 3,195 mm (125.8 in)
- Width: 1,395 mm (54.9 in)
- Height: 1,335 mm (52.6 in)
- Curb weight: 530–570 kg (1,170–1,260 lb)

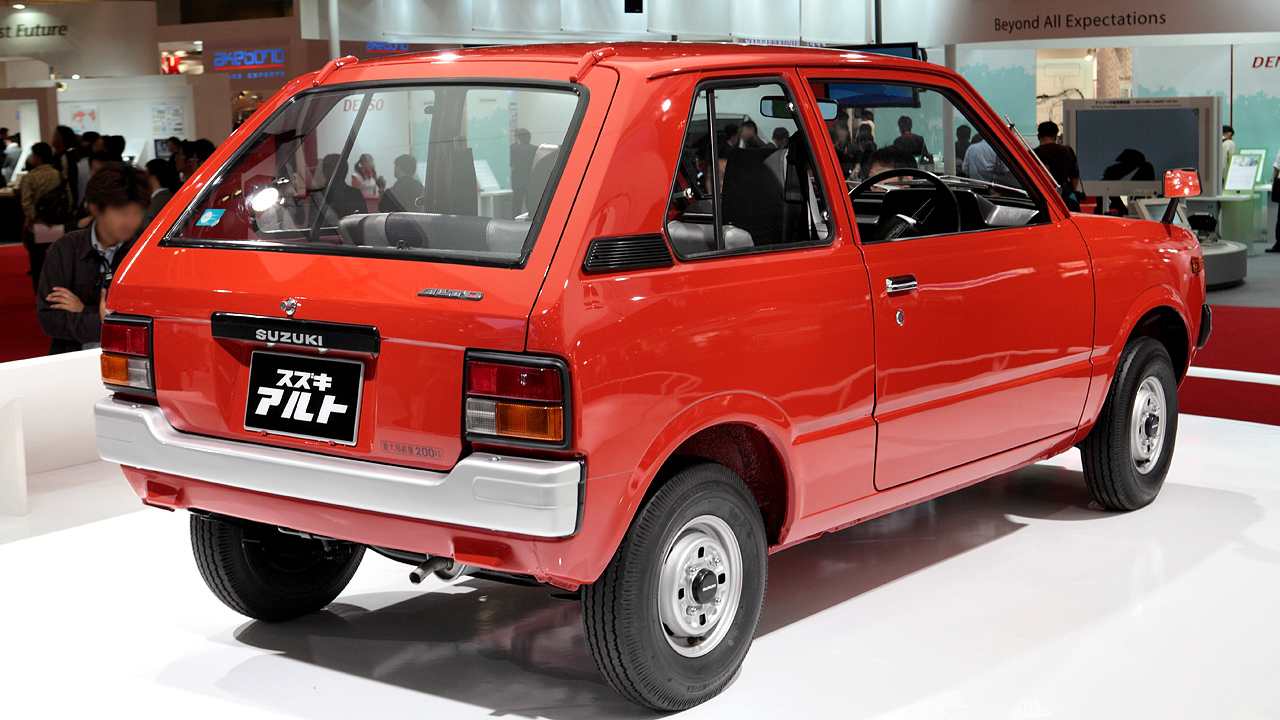
1979 Suzuki Alto Van (SS30V)

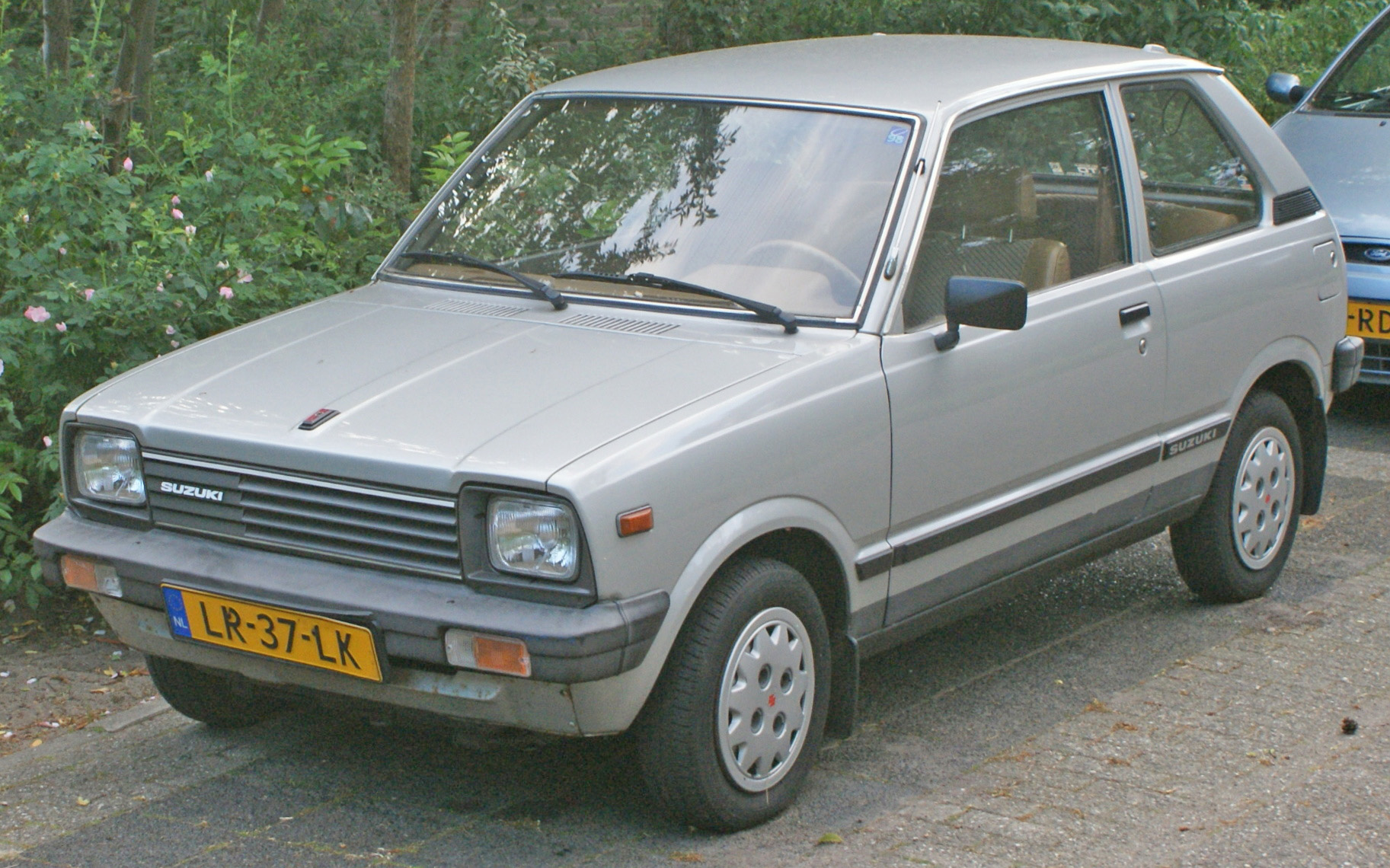
1984 Suzuki Alto 3-door (SS80S, Netherlands), note the facelifted square front lights, extended plastic bumpers and the 12-inch wheels.

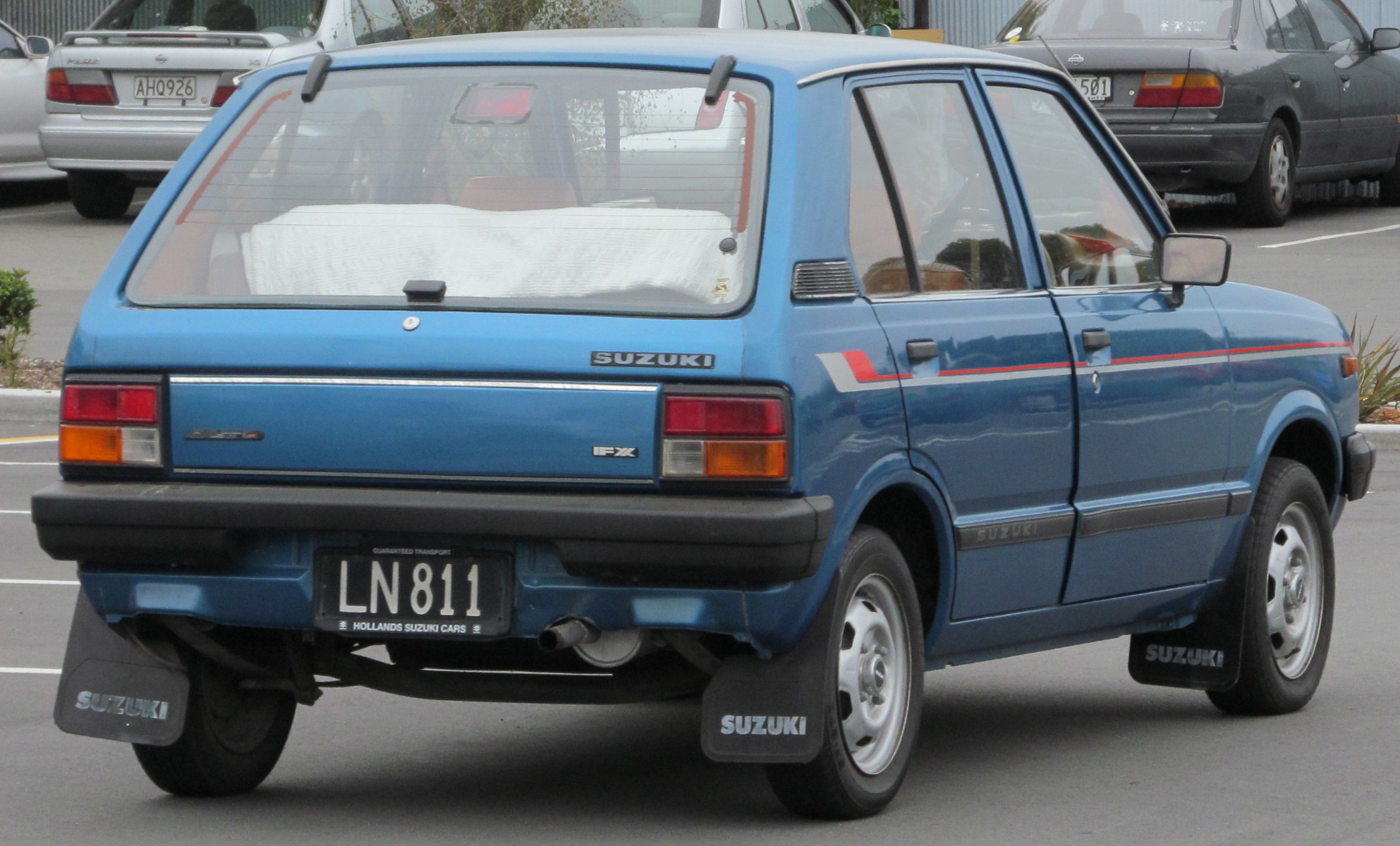
1984 Suzuki Alto FX 5-door (SS80S, New Zealand)

The first generation (SS30V/40V), introduced in May 1979, is a three-door cargo version of the Fronte passenger car, equipped with a folding rear seat. Front suspension comprised coils struts, with leaf springs at the back. The steering was of the recirculating ball type, and four-wheel drums were used. On introduction, the Alto received the T5B two-stroke 539 cc (32.9 cu in) (SS30) three-cylinder engine, producing 28 PS (21 kW) at 5500 rpm. The Alto was a "micro sensation" when introduced, largely due to its rock bottom price of ¥470,000 (circa $1,900 in 1979, at a time when the cheapest Ford Pinto cost $4,999 in the US). This low price was made possible by a number of Japanese special concessions for commercial vehicles: most notably, the engine was subject to less stringent emissions rules and did not require expensive twin catalysts. Two fewer doors provided another saving, as did the exemption from commodity tax. Initially, Suzuki only offered a single model to avoid additional development costs and to avoid making buyers feel short-changed by not buying more expensive variants. In spite of the relentless cost cutting, Suzuki did increase the safety standards with standard equipment not typically found in kei cars at the time, such as three-point belts in front and individually fused headlamps (so that if a fuse were to blow, one headlamp would still work).

The Alto's success changed the kei-car market, and other producers such as Subaru (with the "Family Rex") quickly followed suit with cut-price "commercial" vehicles that were really intended for private use. Suzuki was unable to keep up with demand the first few years, particularly in the home market. The Alto helped Suzuki move into seventh place in Japanese production for cars and trucks. In the last full year of production for this generation, it was still by far the best selling Kei car, with the Alto outselling the passenger-oriented Fronte at a rate of about five to two.

In May 1980, a fully automatic two-speed option was added to the Alto SS30. In January 1981, the F5A four-stroke 543 cc (33.1 cu in) from the Fronte was also made available for the Alto; although it only had a single-barrel carburettor, it too put out 28 PS (21 kW) but at 6,000 rpm. Torque was considerably lower, however, down from 5.3 to 4.2 kg⋅m (52 to 41 N⋅m; 38 to 30 lb⋅ft). 1981 was also when it became available in the United Kingdom, as Suzuki began selling cars there that year.

In export markets, the Alto name was used for the passenger car versions (chassis codes with trailing letter "S") as well as on commercials (ending in "V"), while the van was marketed as the "Suzuki Hatch" in Australia. The four-doors were not proper hatchbacks, only featuring an opening rear window. Export cars were also available with twelve-inch wheels, unlike the domestic versions which only used ten-inch units until the introduction of the 4WD version in October 1983. The 4WD "Snow Liner" thus gained an extra 2.5 cm (1 in) of ground clearance. Most export Altos were passenger car versions (which used the "Fronte" badge in the Japanese domestic markets), and usually received the 796 cc (48.6 cu in) F8B engine and the SS80 chassis code. The 800 had better performance, and due to the higher possible gearing it saw an improved fuel mileage as well - by about ten percent according to Suzuki. The SS80 was also built in New Zealand, by South Pacific Suzuki Assemblers, at a rate of six units per day. It was introduced in New Zealand in March 1980. The two-speed automatic transmission became an available option in New Zealand-built Altos in the latter half of 1984, towards the end of the model's production run.

While Suzuki held on to the two-stroke engine concept for a half decade longer than any of its Japanese competitors, market pressures and ever tightening emissions regulations eventually spelled its end and it was discontinued in the Alto by September 1981. The Jimny, however, did use the same 539 cc (32.9 cu in) engine (called LJ50 in the Jimny) as late as 1987.

Between 1983 and 1986, this generation Alto was built in India as the Maruti Suzuki 800. By 1984, the 800 cc Alto/Fronte (called "FX") were introduced in Pakistan and were locally manufactured by Pak Suzuki Motors along with the 1000 cc Jimny (SJ410).

=== Suzuki Hatch (Australia) ===
In Australia, the SS40V was sold as the Suzuki Hatch, only available as a two-seat commercial vehicle. This meant it was taxed at 35 percent duty as opposed to 57.5 percent for passenger cars, and sales were not affected by Australia's then-quota on import cars. The Hatch originally offered a single-carburetted 543 cc (33.1 cu in) engine with 19.2 kW (26.1 PS; 25.7 bhp) at 6000 rpm and 35 N⋅m (26 lb⋅ft) at 4000 rpm. The side rear windows were covered with fibreglass by default, with glass panels optional. The only other option was air conditioning. The Hatch was by far the cheapest new car sold in Australia at the time, although equipment was limited: the buyer received standard vinyl seats and mats and cross ply tires, with the only concession to luxury being a push-button AM radio. M. W. Suzuki in Victoria, Suzuki's distributor for Southern Australia, introduced the "800 pack" in January 1981 that included the 796 cc (48.6 cu in) motor. The pack also added steel-belt radial tyres, 12-inch wheels (up from 10-inch), front-wheel disc brakes and bolder bumpers front and rear.

== Second generation (1984) ==
Second generation
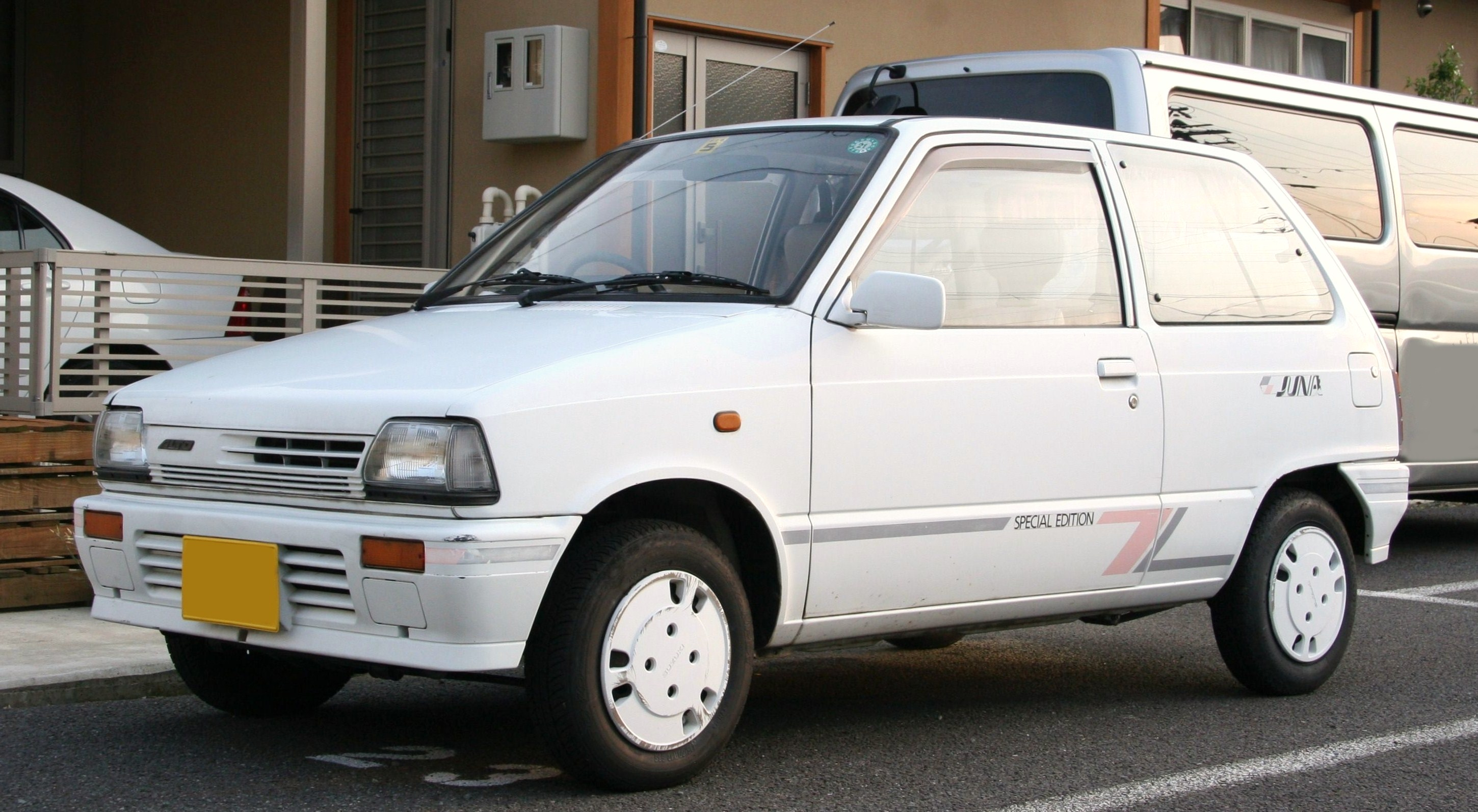
- Suzuki Alto "Juna" Special Edition (CA72)

Overview
- Model code: CA/CB/CC
- Also called: Suzuki Fronte; Suzuki Mehran; Chang'an Alto/City Baby; JN Auto/Jiangnan TT; Maruti 800; Tongtian Glow
- Production: 1984–1988 (Japan); 1995–2010 (China); 1986–2014 (India); 1988–2019 (Pakistan)
- Assembly: Japan: Kosai, Shizuoka; China: Chongqing (Changan Suzuki); China: Xiangtan (Jiangnan, Zotye); India: Haryana, Gurgaon (Maruti Suzuki); New Zealand: Whanganui; Pakistan: Karachi (Pak Suzuki)

Body and chassis
- Body style: 3/5-door hatchback 3/5-door van
- Layout: Front-engine, front-wheel-drive (CA/CB) or four-wheel-drive (CC)
- Related: Suzuki Cervo

Powertrain
- Engine: 543 cc F5A 6-valve SOHC I3; 543 cc F5A 6-valve SOHC turbo I3; 543 cc F5A 12-valve DOHC I3; 543 cc F5A 12-valve DOHC turbo I3; 796 cc F8B 6-valve SOHC
- Transmission: 4/5-speed manual 2/3-speed automatic

Dimensions
- Wheelbase: 2,175 mm (85.6 in)
- Length: 3,195 mm (125.8 in)
- Width: 1,395 mm (54.9 in)
- Height: 1,400–1,435 mm (55.1–56.5 in)
- Curb weight: 540–630 kg (1,190–1,389 lb)

The second generation (CA71) was introduced in September 1984. This generation Alto echoed the design of the GM M-platform that underpinned the 1983 Suzuki Cultus. It continued with the F5A engine of the SS40, but also became available with turbocharged and multi-valve engines thereof, mainly in the "Works" series. In December 1984, a four-wheel-drive version (CC71) was added; until it arrived Suzuki had kept the four-wheel-drive version of the first generation Alto (SS41) on offer. Performance versions of the Alto family first appeared in September 1985, when a fuel injected and turbocharged engine with 44 PS (32 kW) was made available; this could also be had in combination with four-wheel-drive. The Alto Turbo gradually acquired more performance-related modifications until the long running Alto Works version was introduced in February 1987. Producing 64 PS (47 kW), the Alto Works was the most powerful kei car to date and prompted the establishment of a legal limit of this output, still in effect today. It acquired considerable popularity, with models of it still made by Fujimi.

A five-door body became available on the Alto in October 1985. This was superficially identical to that of the Fronte's, but the rear seat folded flat and it was technically speaking a commercial vehicle. This was the first five-door commercial of its kind in Japan, and was originally a special model introduced to celebrate the one millionth Alto produced. The CB model code was not used on the Alto in Japan, as it signifies the passenger car version which was still sold as a Fronte in the home market.

In July 1986, the CA/CC71 received a rather thorough facelift. New wraparound headlights, a new dash and interior heralded the new available ITL rear suspension (Isolated Trailing Link), a three-link rigid setup. Some lower end models retained the earlier leaf sprung rigid axle; those with ITL received the CA/CC72 chassis code. Also new at the time of the facelift was the Alto Twin Cam 12RS; this was the first twin cam, multi-valve engine in the kei class. This version of the F5A produces 42 PS (31 kW) at 7,500 rpm, with an 8,000 rpm redline on the 10,000 rpm tachometer. The very revvy engine was happy to go past its redline on its way to a 9,000 rpm rev limiter, but it was rather coarse, low on torque, and nowhere near as fast as the turbocharged models. On the outside, air dams and large "Twin Cam" stickers announced the new engine, while there was a sporty, black and yellow interior.

A "Walkthrough Van" was introduced in January 1987, while at the other end of the spectrum, the personal coupé Cervo on the CA/CC72 base was introduced in 1988 with a new, 547 cc (33.4 cu in) F5B engine. In August 1987, higher spec Altos became available with a three-speed automatic rather than the two-speed unit that had been used before.

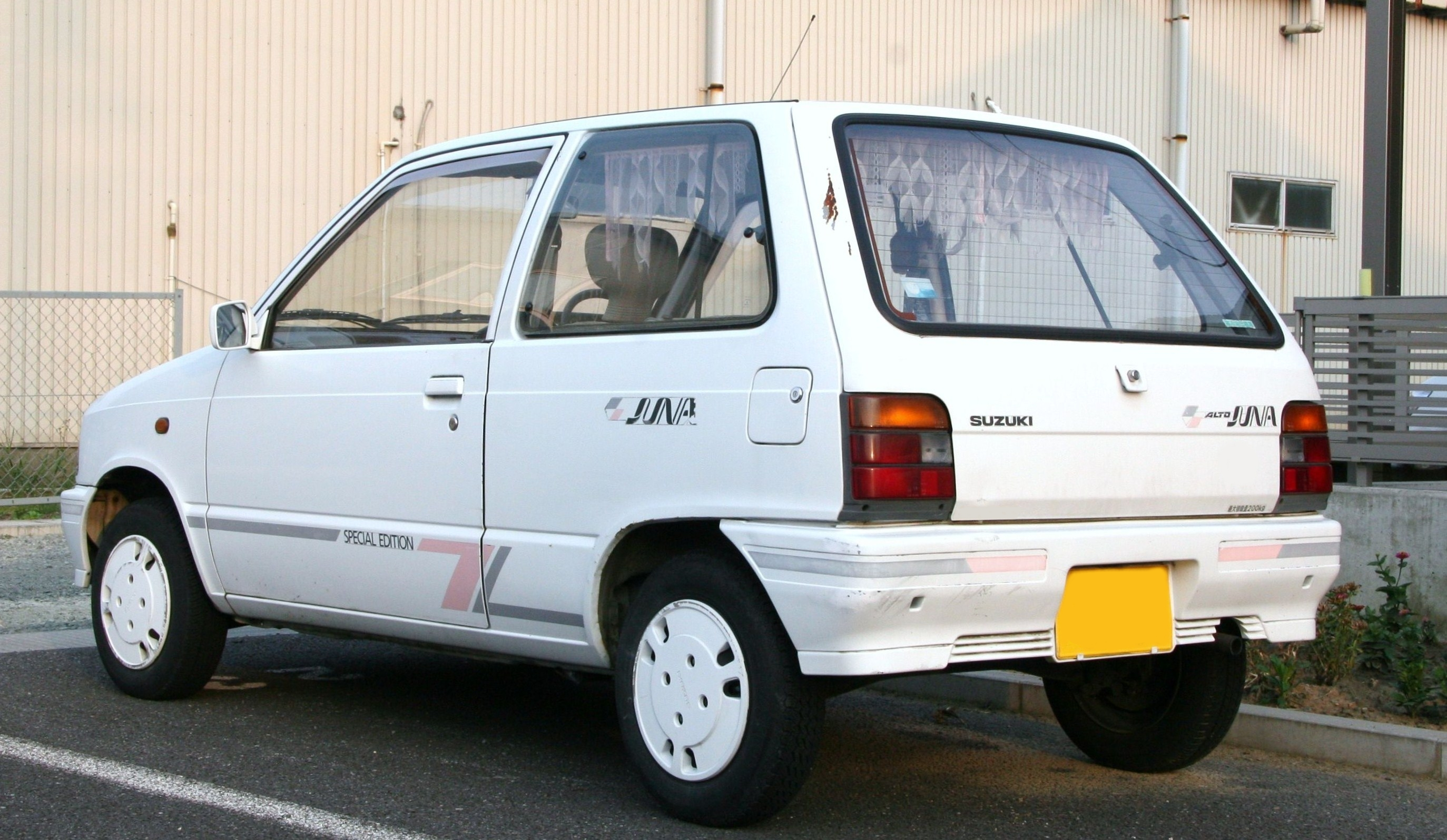
Suzuki Alto "Juna" Special Edition (CA72; rear view)

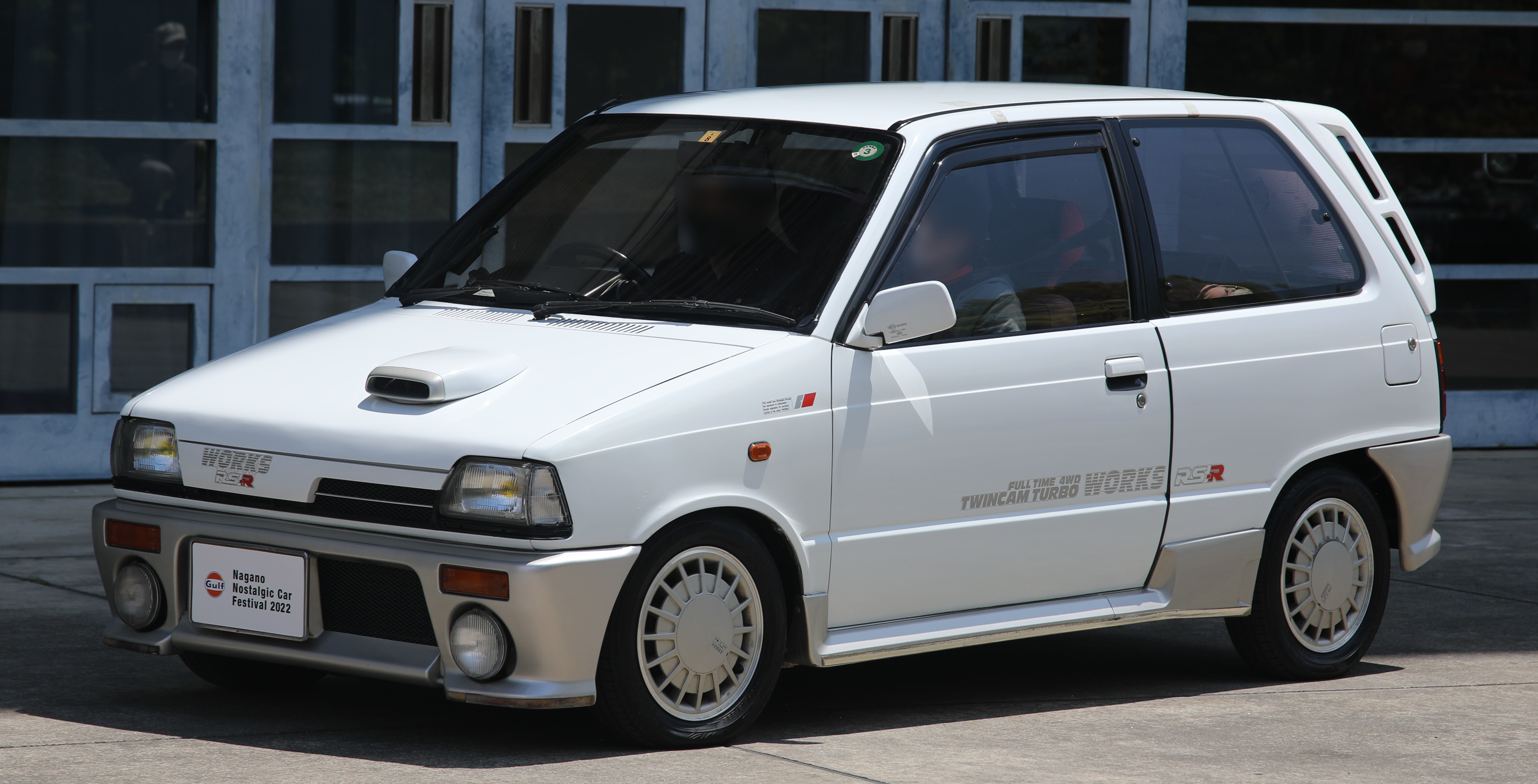
Suzuki Alto Works RS-R (CC72)

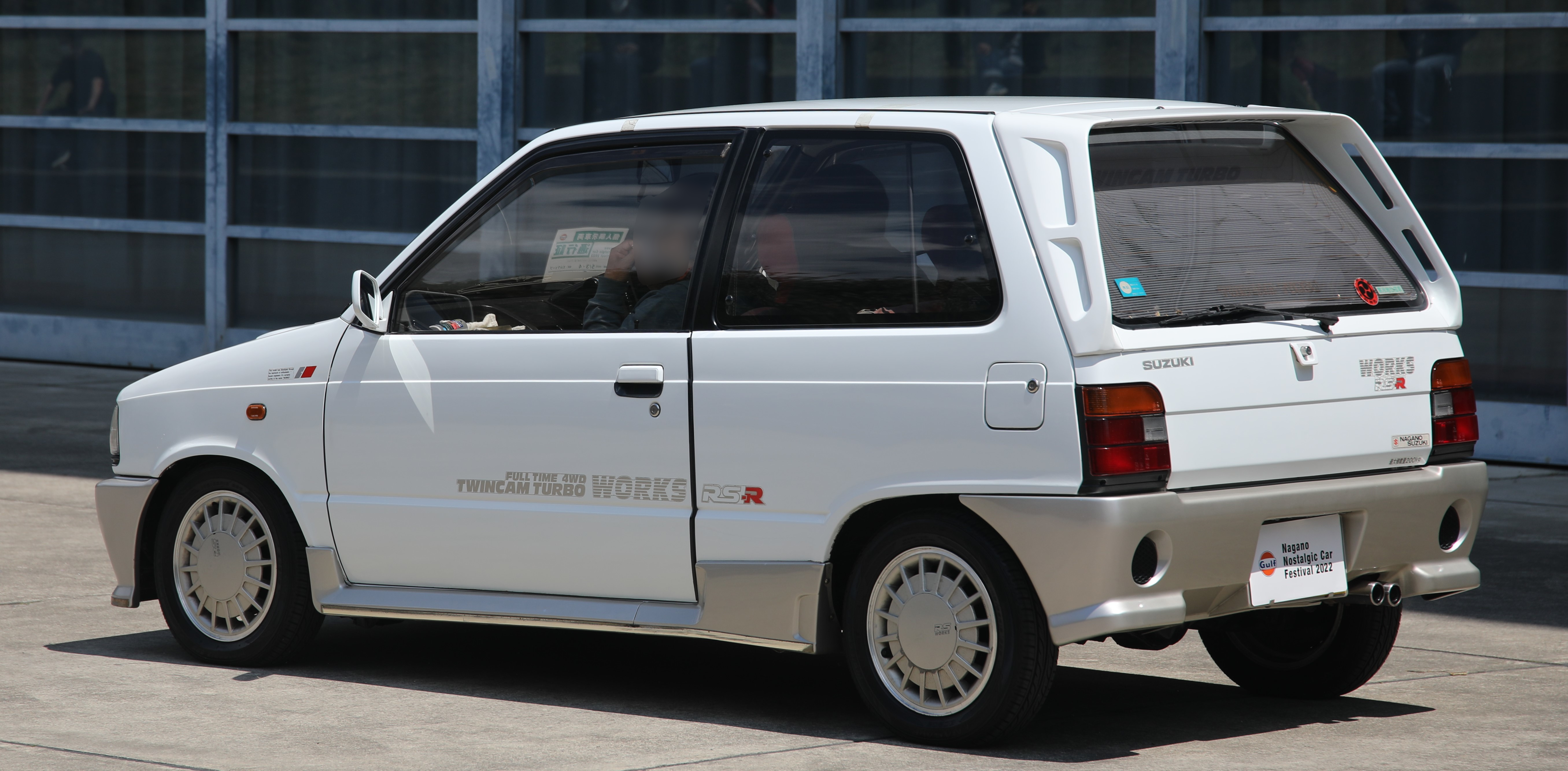
Rear view of Works RS-R

=== Other markets ===
Most export markets received the passenger car version, which would have been badged "Suzuki Fronte" in Japan, but were usually sold as Altos abroad. When equipped with the 543 cc F5A engine, the export model code is SB305. Most cars sold outside of Japan, however, received the larger (0.8 litres) F8B engine and the SB308 model code. The locally produced Alto (SB308) went on sale in New Zealand in October 1985; as with its predecessor, it was the cheapest new car available in that market. It was now built by Suzuki's new, wholly owned subsidiary Suzuki New Zealand. South Pacific Suzuki Vehicle Assemblers, who had been assembling the previous generation, were taken over from the Coleman family in early 1984 along with South Pacific Suzuki Distributors. Suzuki shut down the plant on the last day of 1988, returning to importing fully built-up cars as production of all models had only been about four cars per day.

==== Europe ====
The 796 cc, 41 hp (30 kW) F8B-engined CA/CB91 was sold in Europe with either a four-speed manual or two-speed automatic transmission. Export Altos were technically speaking Frontes, as this was the name used for passenger versions in Japan. They received larger bumpers, making them 105 mm (4.1 in) longer and 10 mm (0.4 in) wider. European Altos received the same facelift as the CA/CB72 did in early 1987 (a little later than in Japan), followed by a market specific facelift in January 1988, unveiled at the Brussels Motor Show. This model remained in production (latterly by Maruti Udyog) for the European market until 1993, when it was replaced by an also Maruti-built 1-litre version of the Cervo Mode, which was sold as the Alto until 2002. The Maruti 800 did continue to be available under its own name in Europe until 2004, when it could no longer pass emissions and safety requirements.

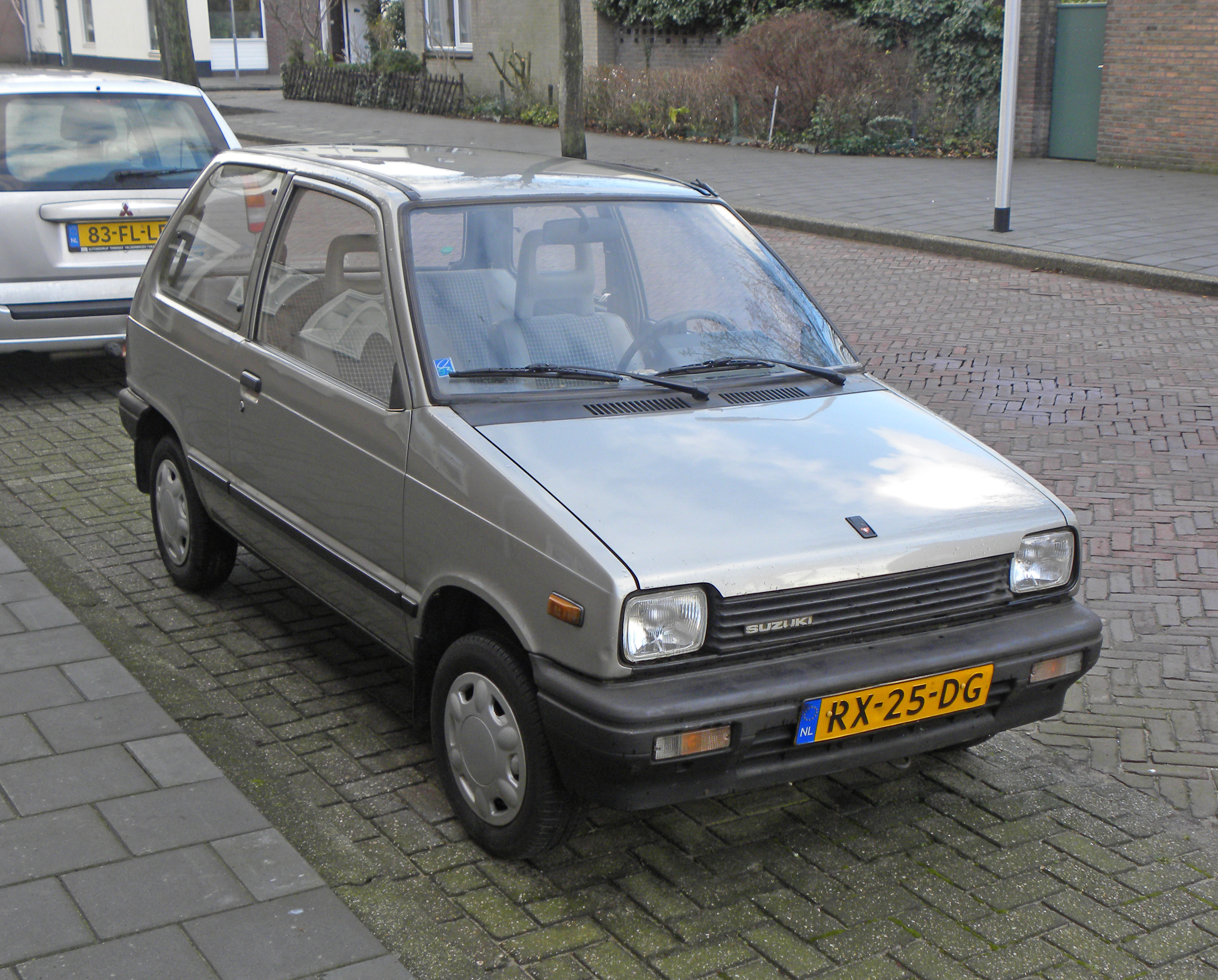
Suzuki Alto GL 3-door (pre-facelift)

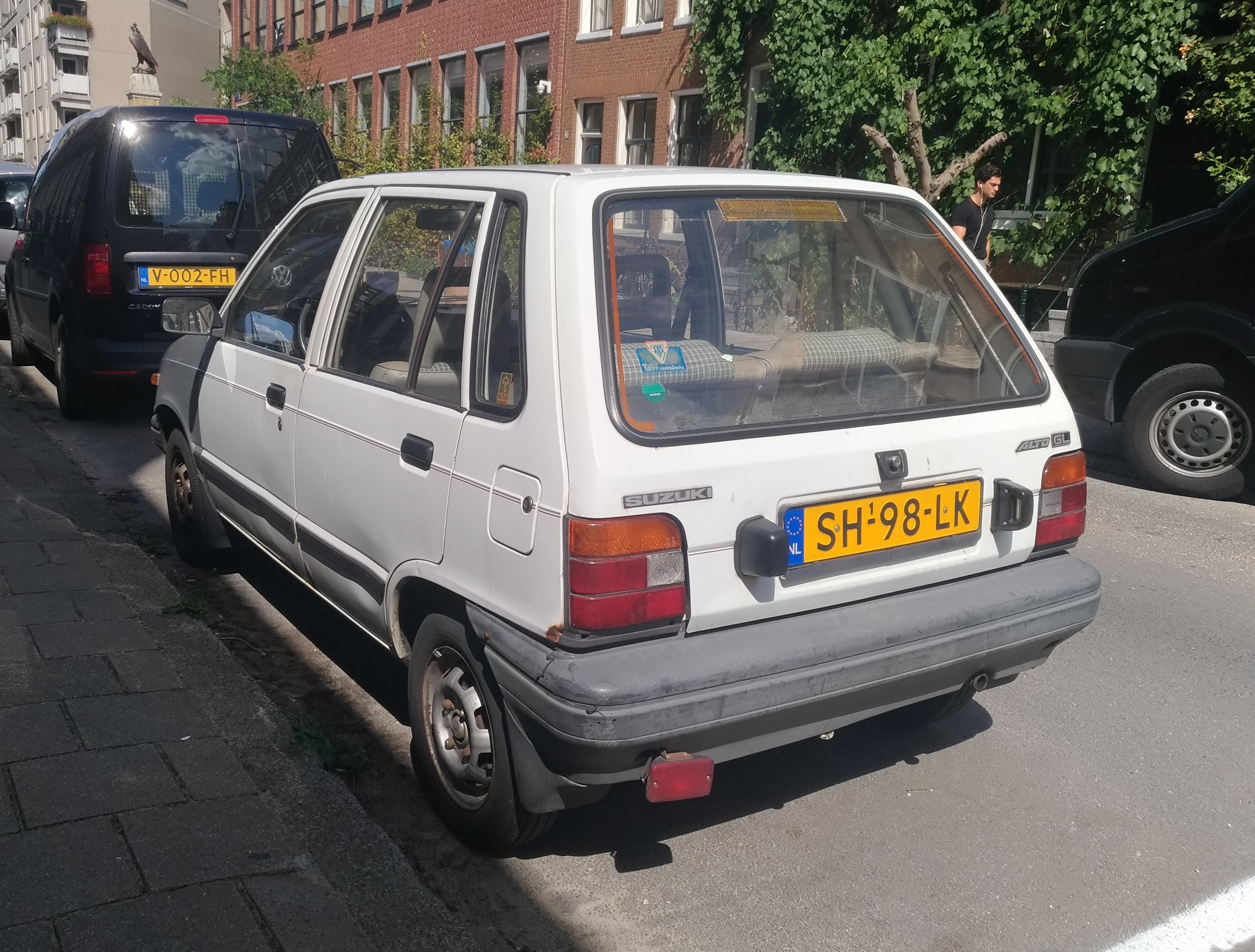
Suzuki Alto 800 5-door (pre-facelift)

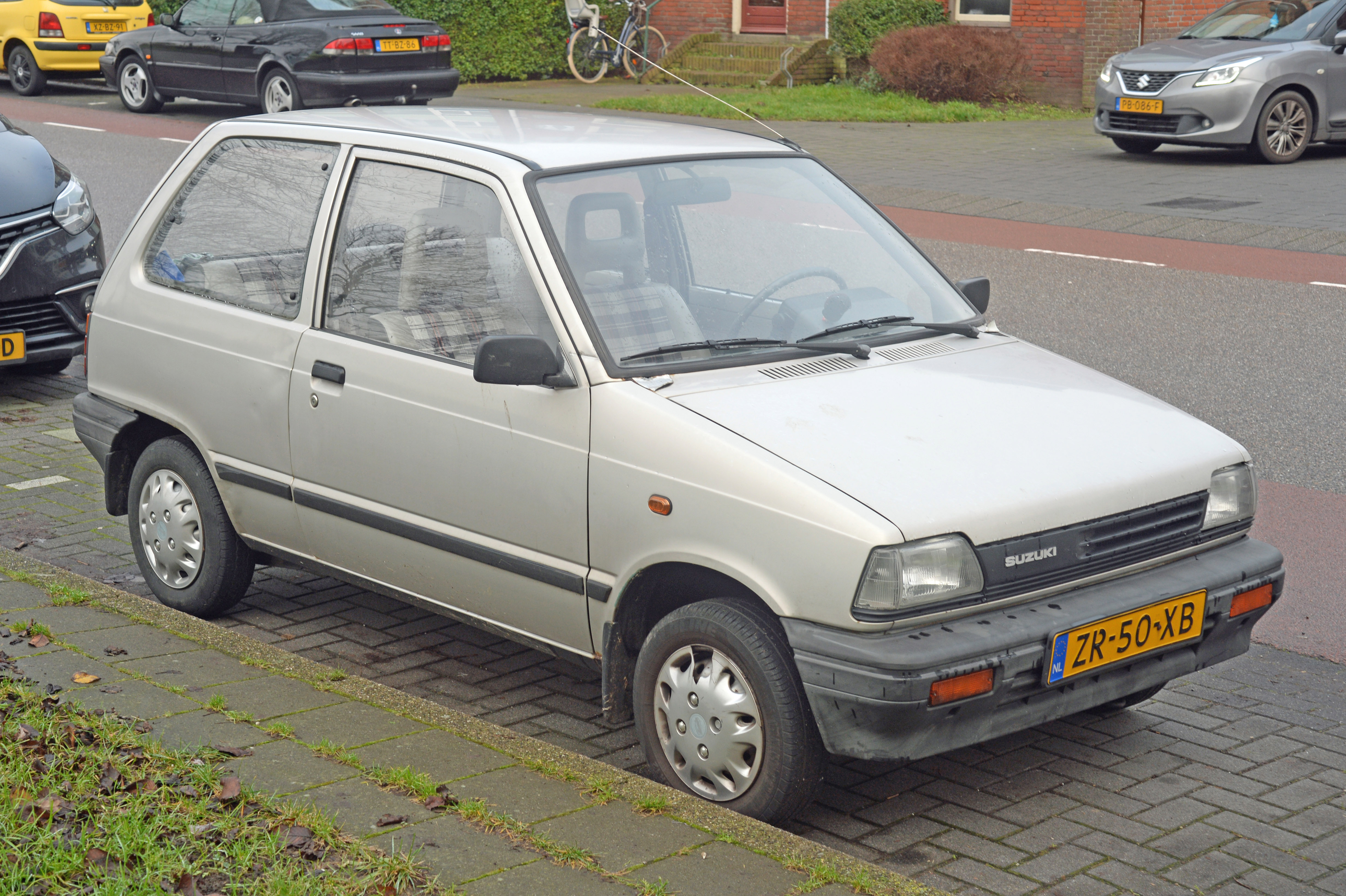
Suzuki Alto GL 3-door (facelift)

==== India ====
The Suzuki Alto was produced and sold in India as the Maruti 800 between late 1986 and 2014, succeeding the previous generation which had been built there since 1983.

==== Pakistan ====
While the car has been long retired in other markets, it remained in production in Pakistan under the moniker Suzuki Mehran. The Pakistani version is essentially a simplified basic rebadged second-generation Suzuki Alto CA/CB91 which was sold in the Japanese and European market from 1984 to 1988. The Mehran remained in production due to its cost effective nature and cheap parts availability. In March 2019, the Mehran officially met its end after over 30 years in production, replaced by the eighth-generation Alto.

==== China ====
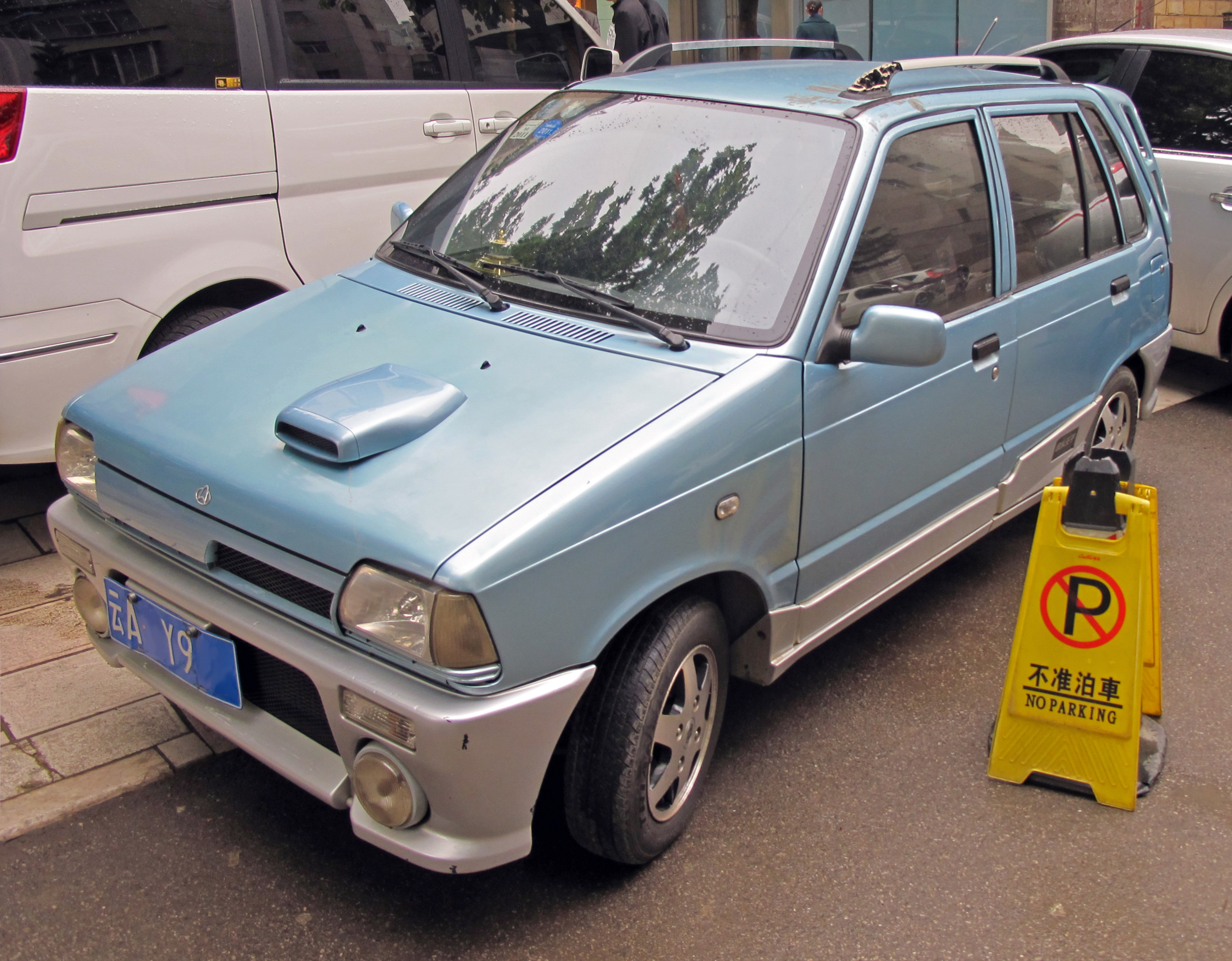
Chang'an SC7081C Happy Prince

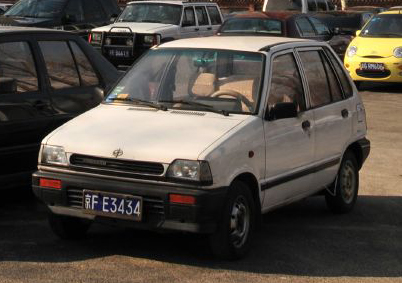
Jiangnan Alto

Around 1990, the China Ordnance Industries Corporation (COIC, a predecessor company to Norinco) purchased the complete rights and all machinery for manufacturing the SB308 Alto from Suzuki. COIC charged four hitherto military enterprises with manufacturing the Alto: Chongqing Chang'an, Jilin Jiangbei, Xiangtan Jiangnan, and Xi'an Qinchuan were all to switch over to civilian manufacture. Chongqing Chang'an were able to adapt Suzuki's just-in-time manufacturing (JIT) methods and were the first to market the car, in 1992. Jilin Jiangbei lost money on each car built and ended up on the brink of bankruptcy; Xiangtan Jiangnan never got production off the ground, while Xi'an Qinchuan suffered a fire and chose to develop their own design instead (a car called the Qinchuan Flyer; the company was later made part of BYD Auto). Chang'an ended up without real competition in the segment. Chang'an's productivity set a new standard for the Chinese auto industry.

In 1993, Changan Automobile took over production of the Alto. The Changan Suzuki SC7080 Alto was produced with the same F8B engine as used in other export markets, and was replaced by the facelifted SC7081 Alto/City Baby/Little Prince/Happy Prince in 2001. The top-of-the-line Happy Prince, discontinued in 2007, used the sportier looking front bumper, grille, and bonnet of the Alto Works. Citing lower sales and stating that upgrading the design to meet new regulations would not be cost effective, Chang'an ended production of the old Alto on 28 July 2008. A total of 504,861 were built by Chang'an Suzuki between 1993 and 2008.

Another version called JN Auto has been built by Jiangnan Automobile (owned by Zotye since 2007). As of December 2010 Zotye's Jiangnan Alto is one of the cheapest car in the world, with a price tag of $2830. The entry-level model comes with the 796 cc (48.6 cu in) F8B three-cylinder 36 PS (26.5 kW). An inline-four engine with a displacement of 1,051 cc (64.1 cu in) and an output of 52 PS (38.5 kW) was also available. The Jiangnan TT was eventually replaced by the Zotye Z100 in 2010.

== Third generation (1988) ==
Third generation
- Alto 5-door sedan (CN21)

Overview
- Model code: CL/CM/CN/CP/CR/CS
- Also called: Suzuki Fronte; Daewoo Tico; Autozam Carol
- Production: 1988–1994; 1991–2001 (Daewoo Tico)
- Assembly: Japan: Kosai, Shizuoka

Body and chassis
- Body style: 3/5-door hatchback; 3/5-door van; 4-door hatchback (sliding door on right)
- Layout: Front-engine, front-wheel-drive or four-wheel-drive

Powertrain
- Engine: 547 cc F5B 6/12-valve SOHC I3; 547 cc F5B 6-valve SOHC turbo I3; 547 cc F5B 12-valve DOHC I3; 547 cc F5B 12-valve DOHC turbo I3; 657 cc F6A 6/12-valve SOHC I3; 657 cc F6A 6-valve SOHC turbo I3; 657 cc F6A 12-valve DOHC turbo I3
- Transmission: 4/5-speed manual; 3-speed automatic

Dimensions
- Wheelbase: 2,335 mm (91.9 in)
- Length: 550 cc: 3,195 mm (125.8 in); 660 cc: 3,295 mm (129.7 in)
- Width: 1,395 mm (54.9 in)
- Height: 1,380 mm (54.3 in); 1,685 mm (66.3 in) (Alto Hustle)
- Curb weight: 540–730 kg (1,190–1,609 lb)

The third generation Alto (CL/CM11) replaced the CA71 in September 1988. This was the last generation of Alto to have an associated Fronte model. It had strikingly angular styling, with an unusual glazed C-pillar on the 5-door. Another curiosity of this generation was the availability of a version with sliding doors (on both sides initially; the layout was changed to an assymetric one in 1990), the "Slide Slim", intended to simplify entering and exiting in tight spaces. It also made ingress and egress easier for the old, the infirm, and people in tight skirts. This door type would not be used by any manufacturer in this way until the arrival of the Toyota Porte and Peugeot 1007. When the Fronte name was discontinued in October 1989, the passenger car versions (CN/CP11) became Altos. Initially the CL11 used the 12-valve 42 PS (31 kW) F5B engine known from the SS71 Cervo, but with an added 34 PS (25 kW) 6-valve version in lower-spec versions. A 46 PS (34 kW) DOHC version was also available in the Twin Cam Rl. Passenger car versions had the same engines, but all with 2 PS less due to more stringent emissions controls. The fuel-injected, 6-valve, turbocharged Works models came with an SOHC 58 PS (43 kW) engine (FF S/X or 4WD S/R) or a 64 PS (47 kW) DOHC version (FF RS/X or 4WD RS/R). The front-wheel-drive Works' were available with a 3-speed automatic in addition to the standard 5-speed manual.

This generation was very successful at home, with Suzuki's kei car sales tripling in 1989 versus the year before. It was, however, not generally exported, and was never built by Suzuki with engines of more than 660 cc nor with left-hand-drive. Export models arrived late, only by 1993 after the earlier export version had been retired, and it was only seen in a very few places, namely New Zealand, Hong Kong, and Singapore. In most countries the earlier Alto/Fronte was replaced by an Alto-badged Maruti Zen (an Indian-built Suzuki Cervo Mode). With a 0.8-litre engine the CL11 Alto was built with left-hand-drive in South Korea, Poland, Romania and Uzbekistan as the Daewoo Tico, and also in China by Anchi.

=== 660cc era ===
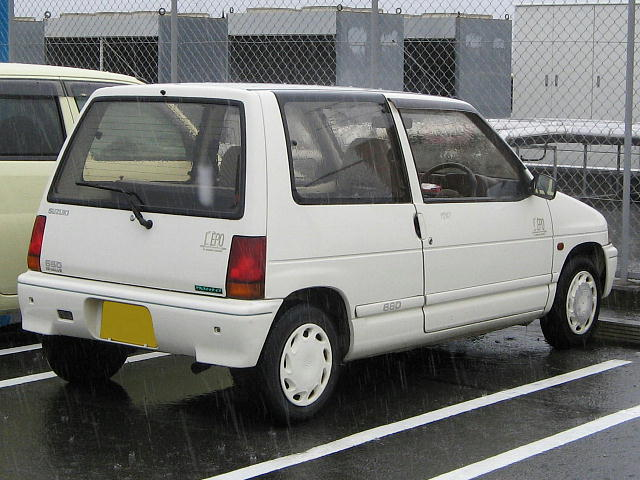
1990-1991 Suzuki Alto l'Èpo-S 3-door sedan (CN21; rear)

1990 Alto Works (CN/CP21)

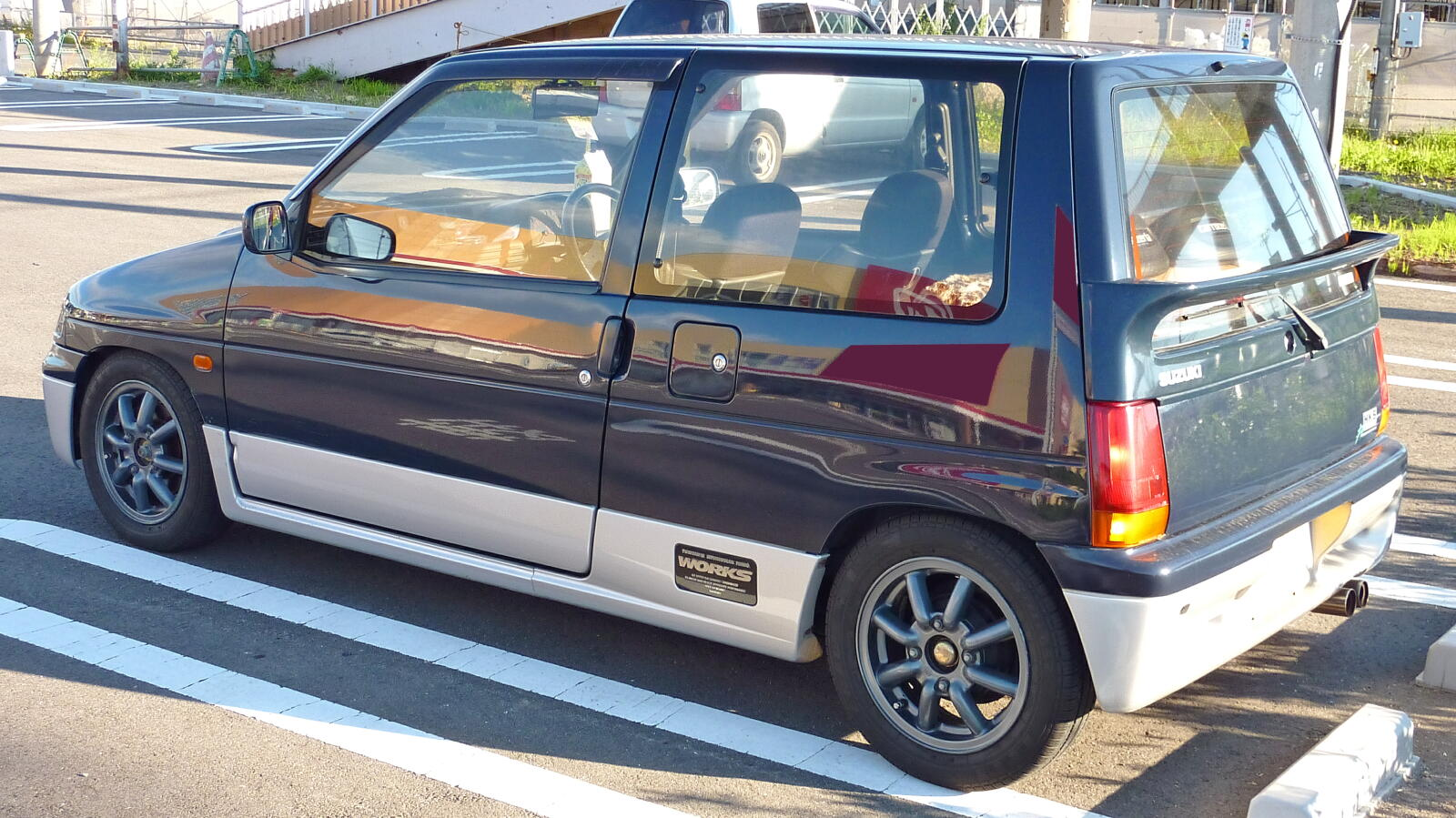
Rear view of Alto Works (CN21), on aftermarket Watanabe Minilite-style alloys

Alto Slide Slim; showing sliding door opening and rotating driver's seat

When the Kei car standards were changed in 1990, the engine was upgraded to the 657 cc (40.1 cu in) (F6A), and the Alto became the CL/CM/CN/CP21 in the process. The new standards also allowed for a 100 mm (3.9 in) longer car, which meant new bigger front and rear bumper, and new headlights and grille. The 660 Alto can easiest be told by its triangular corner lamps, rather than the backwards-sloped design used on the original. The "Slide Slim" was revised and now only had a sliding door on the driver's side, coupled with two regular doors on the passenger (left) side. This was safer in accidents and also made entering and exiting easier, as the sliding door could require effort to operate and might also slam on the finger of a child.

The engine lineup was changed: lower grade Van versions received a 6-valve 36 PS (26 kW) engine, while passenger car versions (and the more expensive l'Èpo Van) got a single-cam 12-valve 42 PS (31 kW) version. This engine was upgraded to 52 PS (38 kW) in January 1991. 4WD versions with the three-speed automatic transmission were fuel-injected and offered three more horsepower. The F6A-engined Works RS/X and RS/R still claimed the legally limited 64 PS (47 kW) with 8.7 kg⋅m (85 N⋅m; 63 lb⋅ft) of torque, but the lower grade i.e. Turbo (introduced in July) received a 6-valve SOHC-engine producing 61 PS (45 kW) and 9.2 kg⋅m (90 N⋅m; 67 lb⋅ft) of torque (slightly more than the high-revving, twin cam RS). Reflecting decreased tax benefits for commercial Kei cars, the Works series were now classified as passenger vehicles, allowing for a real back seat. The lineup was reorganised in January 1991, with a lot of new engine specifications.

==== Facelift ====
In September 1991, responding to increasing safety requirements, Altos for passenger use received side impact protection. Also, the vertical door handles (see picture on the right) on three-door versions were replaced by traditional horizontal ones. The re-engineering was extensive enough to necessitate new model codes, with vans becoming CL/CM22 (FF/4WD) and passenger versions (including the Works) now called CR/CS22. The dashboard was also changed, with the initial, narrow pod replaced by a larger, blockier instrument housing which also contained the HVAC controls and vents. While most of the engines remained as they were, the Alto Van's engines were updated with power output up to 40 PS (29 kW). By October 1993, the Slide Slim bodystyle was no longer in the price lists.

This type was the only third generation Alto to reach (limited) exports. The New Zealand version was mostly the same as the Japanese market five-door van model, with a cargo-oriented bare-bones trim combined with the rather soft Japanese suspension settings and light, low-geared steering. Unlike the Japanese models, however, this low spec was coupled to the (carbureted) 12-valve engine with 38.2 kW (52 PS; 51 hp) and a standard five-speed transmission. A three-speed automatic was also available. In a period test, this model reached the 0–100 km/h benchmark in 15.9 seconds and a top speed of 148 km/h (92 mph).

1992 Suzuki Alto 5-door (second facelift; CS22)

1992 Suzuki Alto Fe-P 4WD 5-door (CS22; rear)

A very limited production version for competition purposes arrived in 1992, called the Alto Works R. This was a lightened, strict two-seater with four-wheel-drive, a close-ratio five-speed transmission, and a tuned engine - although official output remained 64 PS (47 kW), as required by the Kei regulations. The car has an adjusted ECU and a free-flow Suzuki Sport RHB31 turbocharger, as well as a different throttle body. Less than a hundred were built, although it continued to be available until the arrival of the next generation Alto. This model, without a backseat and with racing bucket seats in front, was classified as a van and accordingly received the CM22V chassis code, unlike the usual Alto Works. The undercoating and most creature comforts were deleted (although air conditioning remained an option) and the car sat on steel wheels, which made the car about 20 kg (45 lb) lighter than a regular Works RS/R.

==== Alto Hustle ====
Suzuki also produced a version of the Alto, known as the Alto Hustle, with a raised roof behind the front seats. This was unusual in that it used a modification of the five-door Alto's body rather than a completely new body, allowing Suzuki to market it as part of the Alto family. Its appearance was similar to the Nissan AD Max van. The interior had a variety of storage compartments, including spaces above the front seat occupants' heads. The Hustle was short-lived, only being offered between November 1991 and October 1993.

The engine options were mostly as for other Altos, albeit without the turbocharged offerings. The standard model has 40 PS (29 kW), while a 12-valve version has 52 or 55 PS (38 or 40 kW) depending on if it was carburetted or fuel injected. The lowest and highest-powered versions were also available with four-wheel-drive, and there was also a bare bones, two-seater version (Hu-2) on offer.

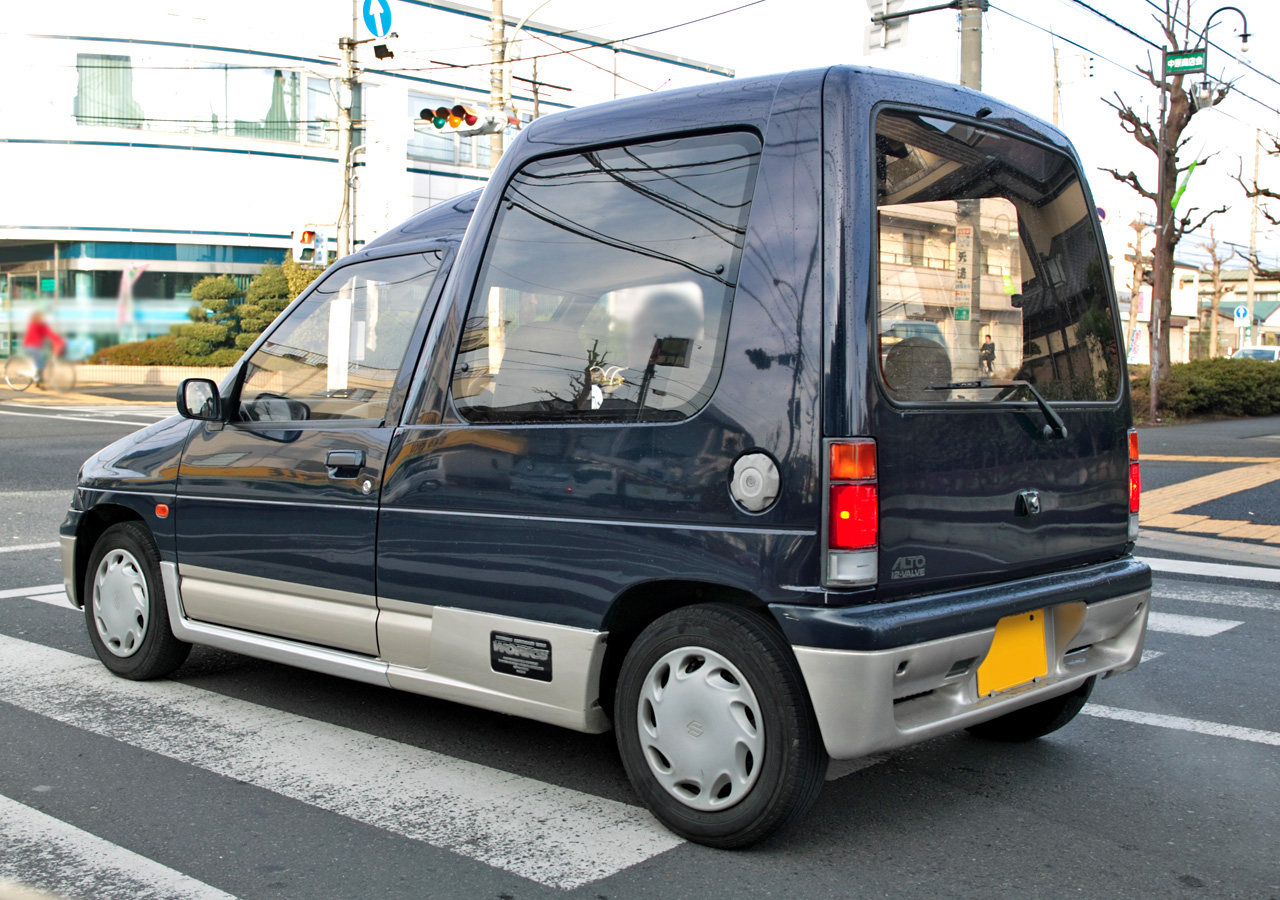
Alto Hustle (CR22S), equipped with Alto Works sideskirts

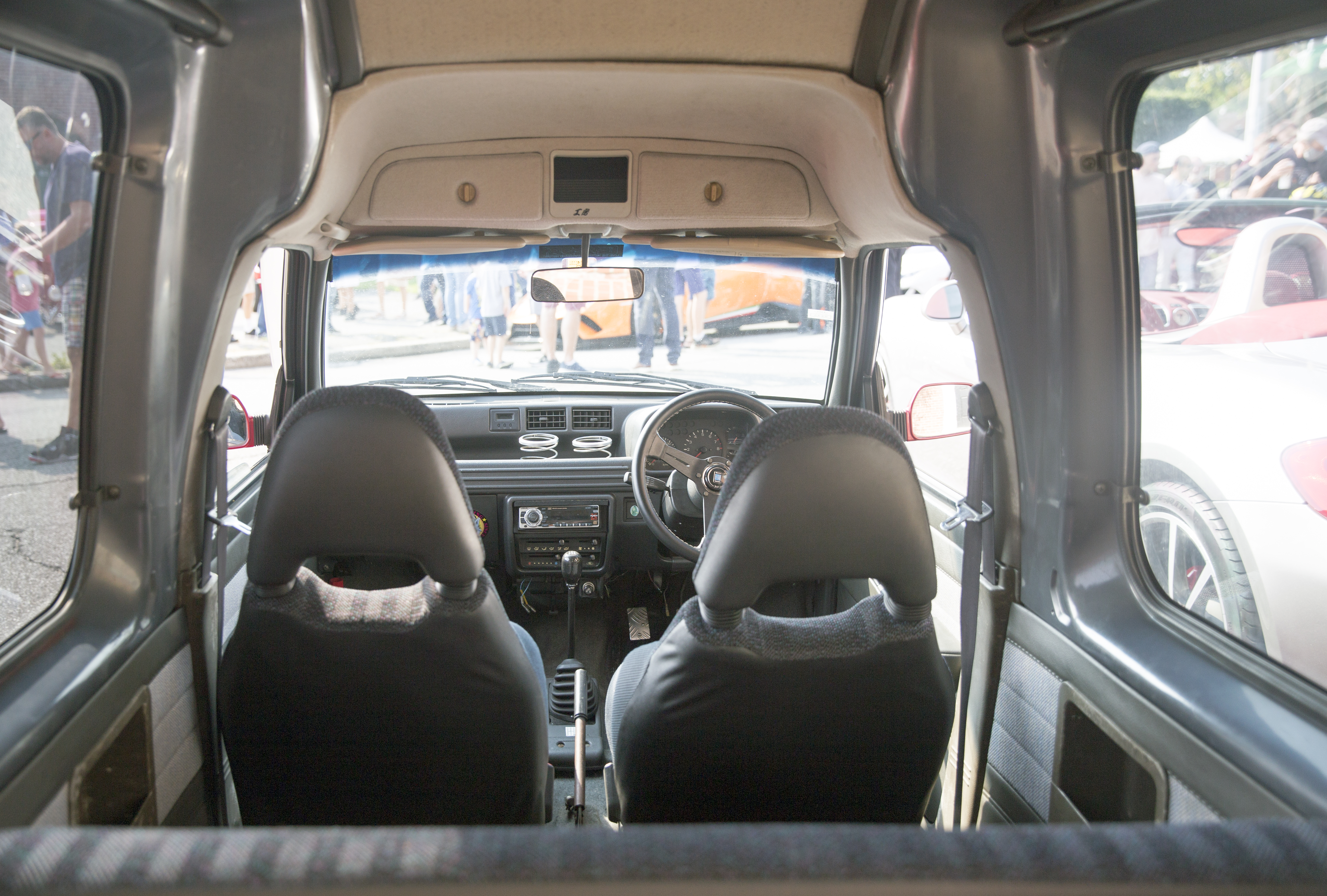
Alto Hustle interior

== Fourth generation (1994) ==
Fourth generation
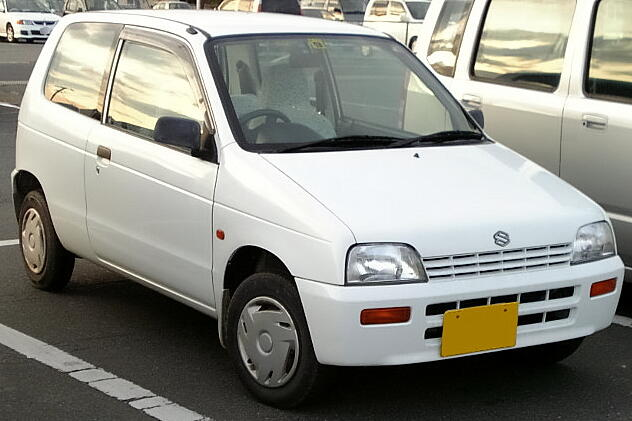

Overview
- Model code: HA11/HA21
- Production: 1994–1998
- Assembly: Japan: Kosai, Shizuoka

Body and chassis
- Body style: 3/5-door hatchback; 3-door van
- Layout: Front-engine, front-wheel-drive (HA11/HC11/HA21); Front-engine, four-wheel-drive (HB11/HD11/HB21)
- Related: Mazda Carol

Powertrain
- Engine: 657 cc F6A SOHC I3; 657 cc F6A DOHC I3; 657 cc F6A SOHC turbo I3; 657 cc F6A DOHC turbo I3; 658 cc K6A DOHC turbo I3

Dimensions
- Wheelbase: 2,335 mm (91.9 in)
- Length: 3,295 mm (129.7 in)
- Width: 1,395 mm (54.9 in)
- Curb weight: 600–710 kg (1,323–1,565 lb)

The fourth-generation Alto (HA11) appeared in November 1994. The design was marked by simplicity, as Suzuki strived to return to making a more basic car. Models with significant engineering differences, namely the Slide Slim with its sliding door on one side, and the column-shift, bench seat Regina, were discontinued to cut development costs. The new Wagon R took over much of the more expensive Alto's market share, leaving the Alto to compete at the lower end of the market. The fourth generation was generally not exported, with most foreign markets instead receiving Alto-badged versions of the Indian-built Maruti Zen.

There was also an Alto Van model intended for commercial use, although this section of the market was disappearing as various tax advantages had been gradually whittled away since the beginning of the decade. The Vans received HC11 or HD11 chassis codes, with the latter signifying four-wheel drive. For the sedans, model codes are HA11 or HB11 (HB for four-wheel drive), while the K6A-engined versions are HA21 or HB21.

The 657 cc F6A engines were joined by a new high-performance 64 PS (47 kW), 658 cc K6A for the Works RS/Z model. Front-wheel drive or full-time four-wheel drive were offered, in three- or five-door sedans or as a three-door van. The Works model was also reclassified as a sedan, as many advantages for light commercial cars had vanished. The tailgate and rear doors are still fairly angular, but the front was more rounded than previous models.

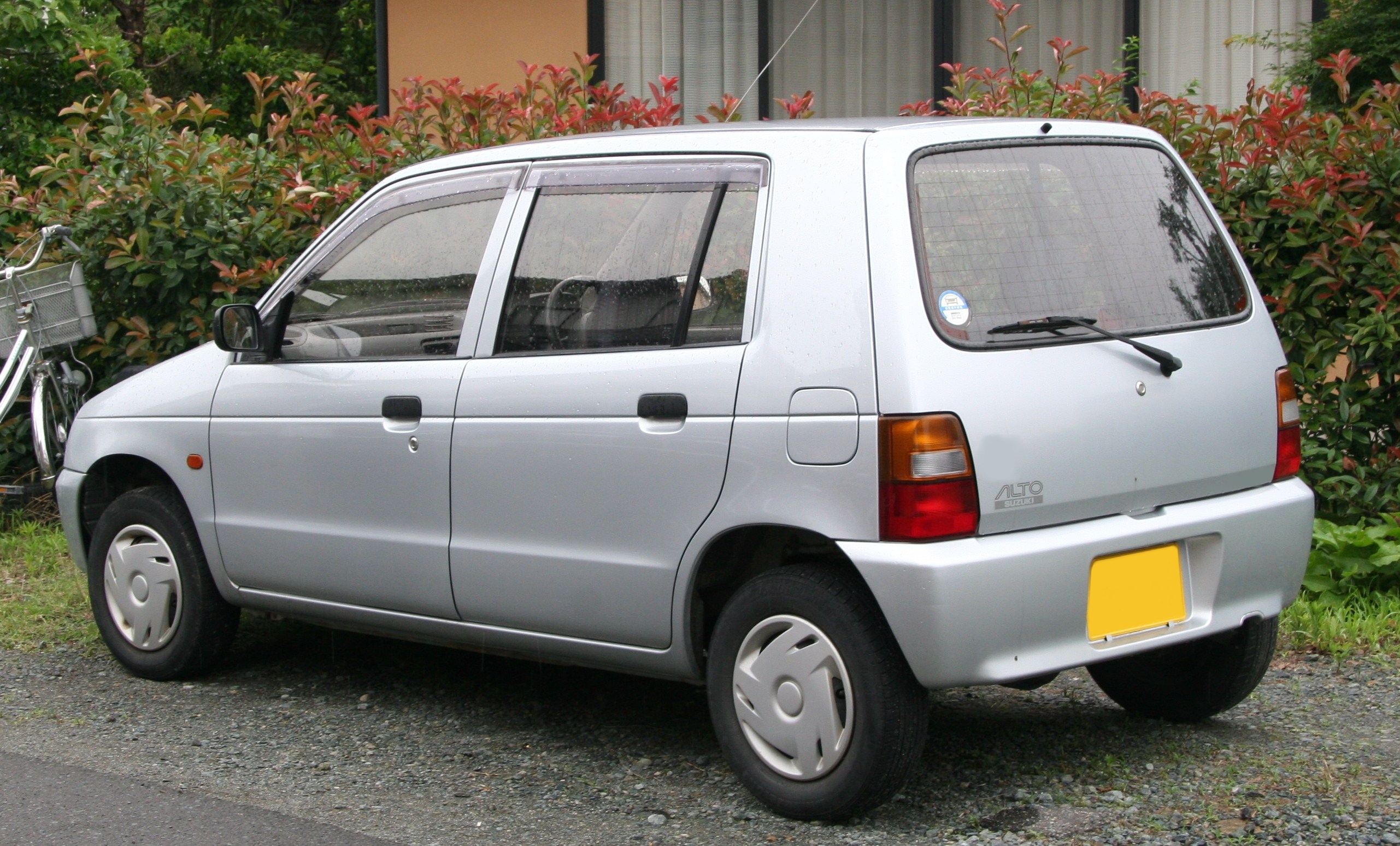
Pre-facelift model Suzuki Alto 5-door (HA11; rear view)

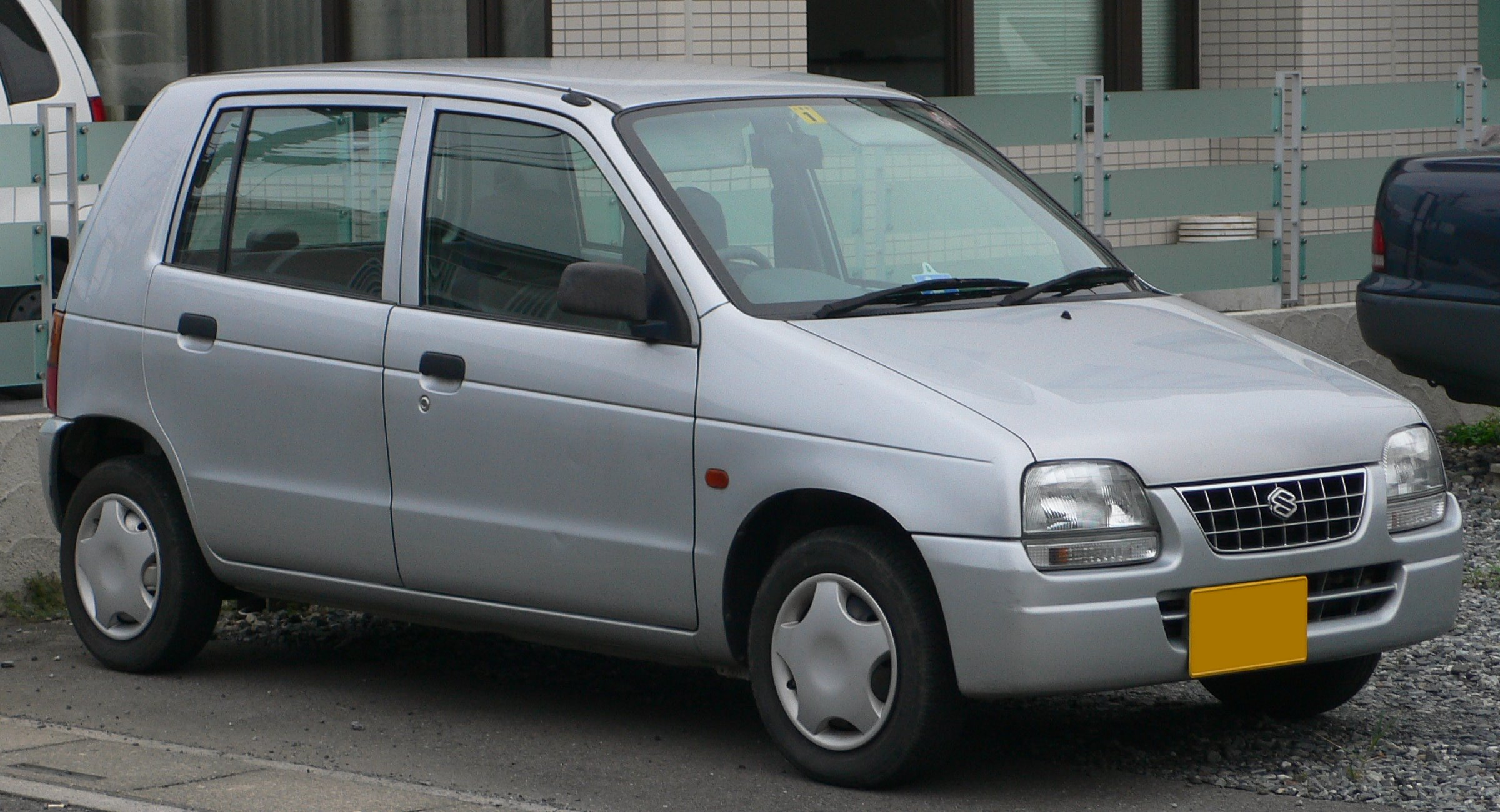
Facelift model Suzuki Alto 5-door (HA11)

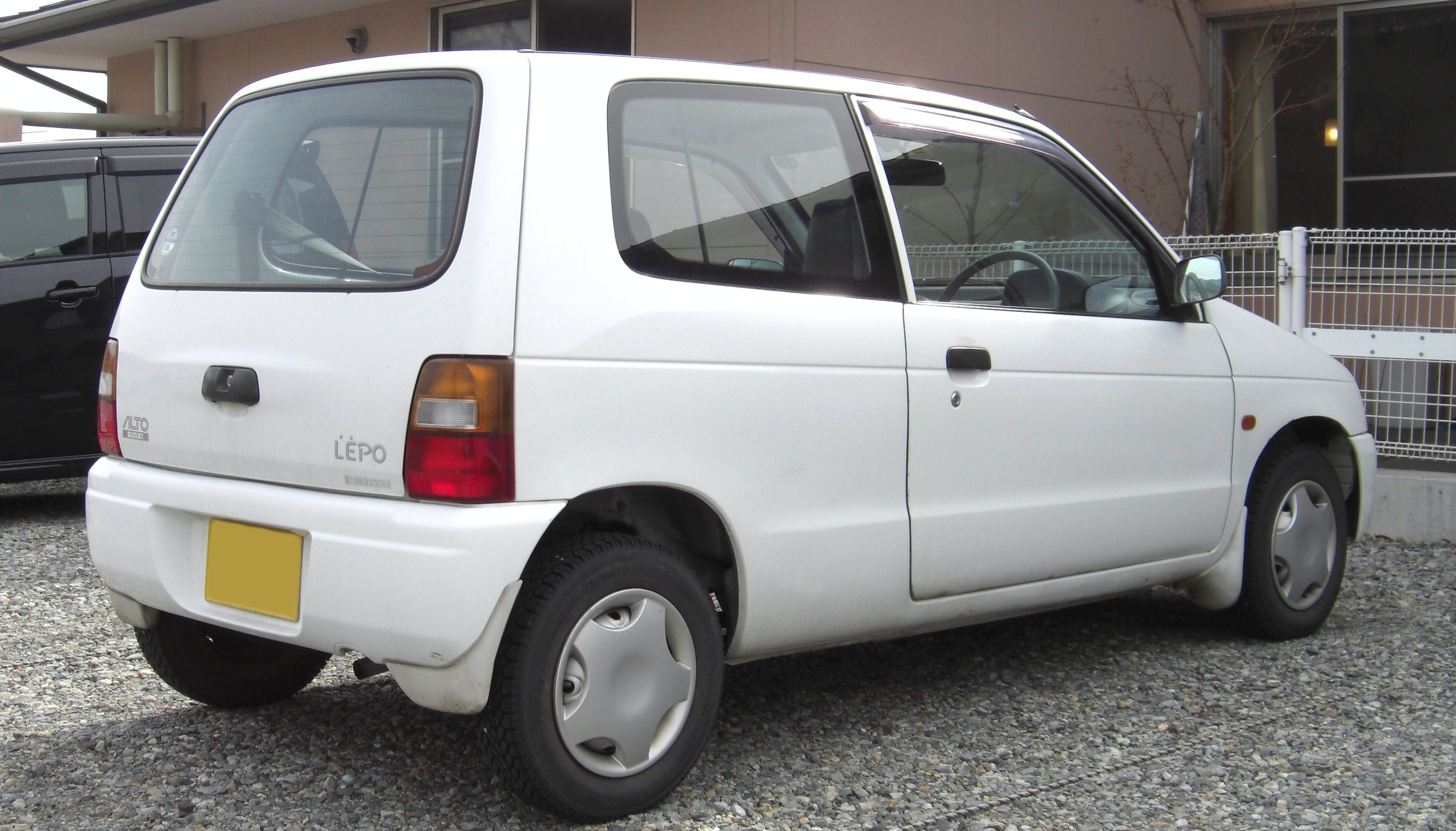
Facelift model Suzuki Alto l'Èpo 3-door (HA11)

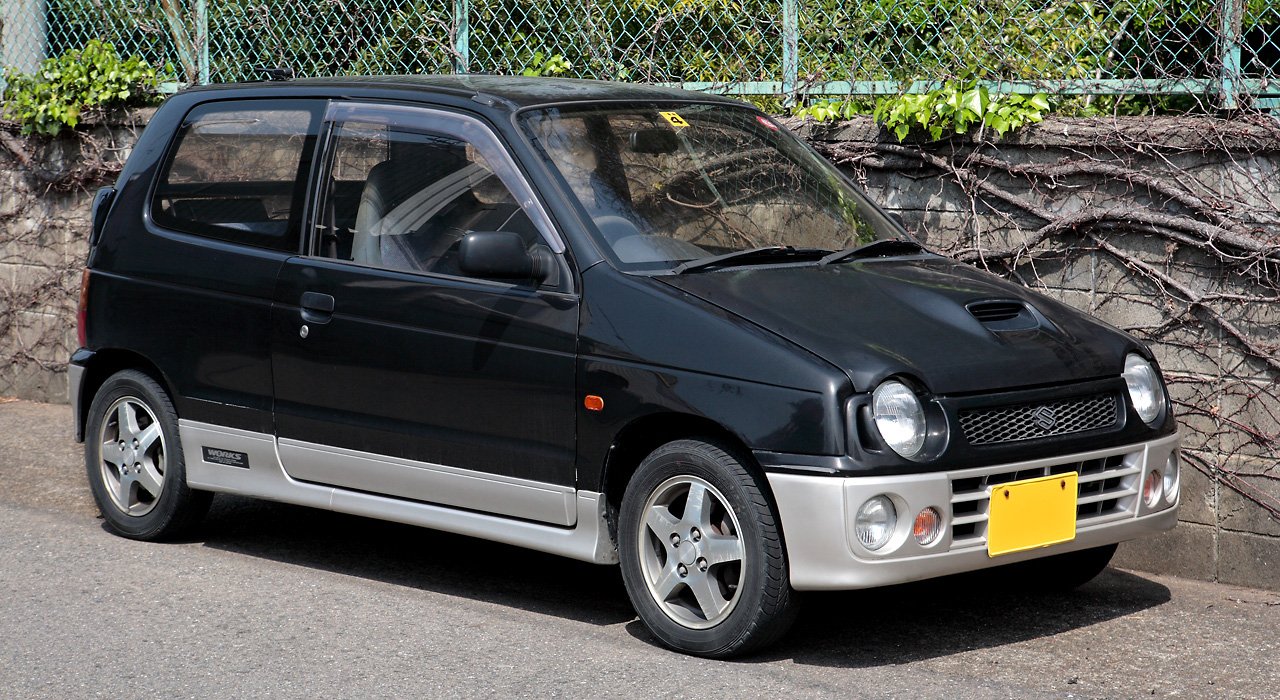
Suzuki Alto Works RS/Z (HA21), facelift model

=== Chronology ===
In March 1995, the Alto Sv model appeared. This was a special fuel economy model, well equipped with air conditioning, power steering, AM/FM cassette stereo, etc. The "Alto With", a limited sporty edition based on the well-equipped Sf model (also with four-wheel drive) with a front and rear spoiler, appeared in June 1995. In July 1995, a version of the Works Turbo ie/s called the Limited appeared; this had special stereo equipment and keyless entry and power locks. It was developed by AddZest (Clarion). In November 1995, the Works model received a new grille and front bumper, with a bigger opening. In May 1996, the l'Èpo model appeared, this three or five-door sedan was based on the Se/Le model and was also available with four-wheel drive. This version received full power equipment, remote key entry, distinctly upholstered full fabric seats (rather than the vinyl backed units of the Se/Le), hubcaps and many other amenities.

The Works Turbo F Limited ie/s version appeared in November 1996, offering a carbon panel, special alloy wheels, and more spoilers. In April 1997, the range received a facelift with side door impact beams and a new front design, with new marker lights beneath the headlights and a redesigned trunklid. The Alto l'Èpo P2 appeared at the same time, using a fuel injected version of the 12-valve engine with 55 PS (40 kW) rather than the usual 52 PS (38 kW) carburetted unit. All 12-valve models fitted with four-wheel drive and automatic transmission received a 55 PS (40 kW) fuel injected version, as was the case since the third generation Alto. The l'Èpo models also received a new (optional) airbag. The Works models only received smaller changes at this time, such as white-backed meters in the dashboard. The RS/Z also received 14-inch wheels and fuller equipment. In November 1997, the even better equipped l'Èpo Limited model appeared, with a more powerful stereo system including a CD player. In January 1998, the Works Sports Limited model appeared, a Works ie/s with 14-inch wheels and special seats. In May the "Alto Beam" special model appeared, with UV reflecting glass and extra large seats.

In March 1995, a second iteration of the Works R arrived, again a limited production vehicle with a close-ratio transmission, built for competition purposes. Like the first Works R it was built in less than one-hundred examples, but this one appeared in two series: The Series 2 had sold out by October 1995 and the third series was available from January until September 1998. Unlike the first Works R, this one was a passenger car version (chassis code HB21S) and received the new, lightweight K6A engine. It was lighter than the regular Works RS/R, and the engine was considerably more powerful - although claimed output remained 64 PS (47 kW) as per the regulations, torque increased from 10.5 to 11.0 kgm (at 3500 rpm for the Series 2, 4000 rpm for the Series 3). Period sources state that the engine's actual output was at least 80 PS (59 kW). The engine received considerable changes over the regular Works, many more than the first Works R. The throttle body and camshafts were different, while a larger HT06/RA12 turbocharger was fitted, along with 260 cc injectors and a larger intercooler (necessitating a hood scoop nearly as wide as the bonnet itself). The weight savings were only 10 kg (22 lb) over the Works RS/Z for this model. This was the end of the Works R series of cars, foreshadowing the end of the Works badge in 2000.

== Fifth generation (1998) ==
Fifth generation
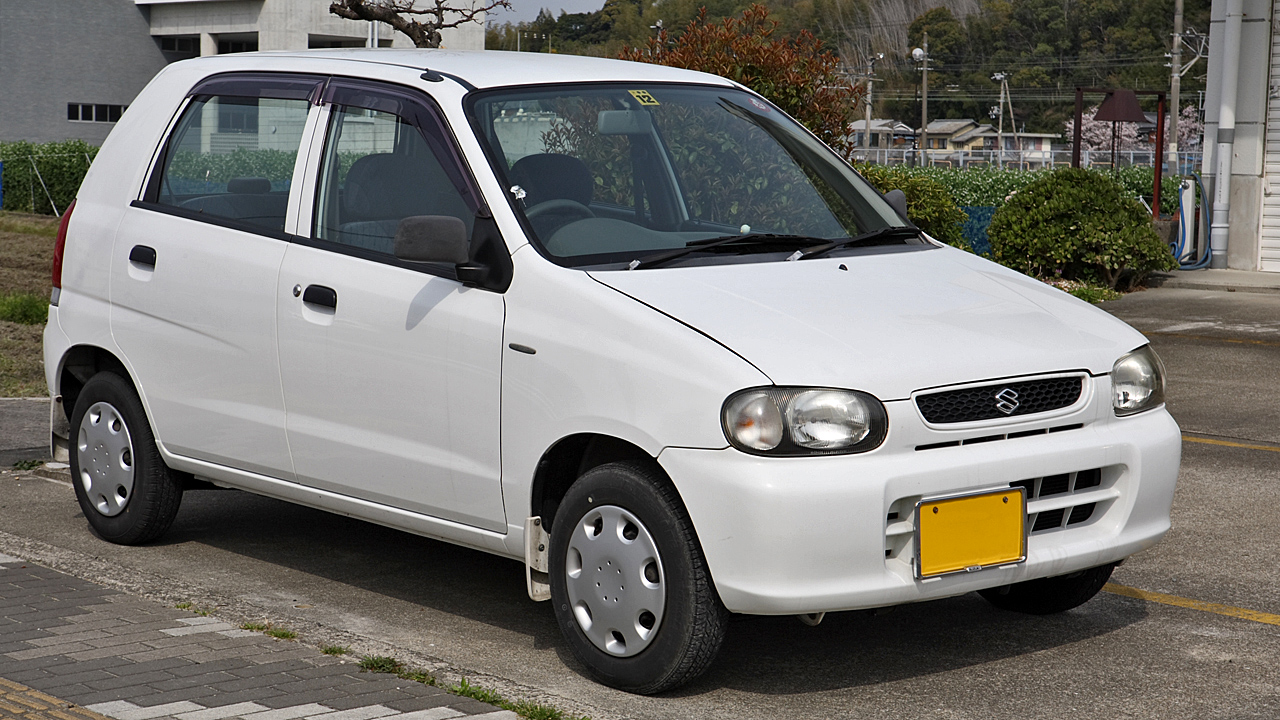

Overview
- Model code: HA12 (F6A engine); HA22 (K6A engine); HA23 (facelift, K6A)
- Also called: Chevrolet Alto; Mazda Carol
- Production: 1998–2005 (Japan); 2000–2012 (Pakistan); 2000–2014 (India); 2000–2003 (Colombia)
- Assembly: Japan: Kosai, Shizuoka; Pakistan: Karachi (Pak Suzuki); Colombia: Bogotá (GM Colmotores); India: Manesar (Maruti Suzuki)

Body and chassis
- Body style: 3/5-door hatchback; 3-door van
- Layout: Front-engine, front-wheel-drive; Front-engine, four-wheel-drive (Japan)
- Related: Maruti Suzuki Alto; Mitsuoka Ray

Powertrain
- Engine: 657 cc F6A OHC 6/12V I3; 657 cc F6A OHC 6V turbo I3; 658 cc K6A DOHC 12V I3; 658 cc K6A DOHC 12V turbo I3; 796 cc F8D OHC 12V I3 (Alto 800); 970 cc F10A OHC 8V I4 (Pakistan); 996 cc K10A DOHC 16V I4 (Chevrolet Alto); 998 cc K10B DOHC 12V I4 (Alto K10); 1061 cc F10D OHC 16V I4 (Alto 1.1)
- Transmission: 4/5-speed manual; 3/4-speed automatic; CVT

Dimensions
- Wheelbase: 2,360 mm (92.9 in)
- Length: 3,395 mm (133.7 in); 3,495 mm (137.6 in) (Alto 800/1.1); 3,620 mm (142.5 in) (Alto K10)
- Width: 1,475 mm (58.1 in); 1,495 mm (58.9 in) (Alto K10)
- Height: 1,440–1,460 mm (56.7–57.5 in)
- Curb weight: 630–800 kg (1,389–1,764 lb)

The fifth-generation Alto (HA12/22) was introduced in October 1998. The styling was generally more rounded, the shape of the cabin showing the Alto's relationship with the new Suzuki Kei. Suzuki designed the new Alto with an eye to reducing cost, both for themselves and for the end users. To that end, weight was reduced to a minimum, while four-wheel drive models were able to use the same bottom plate as front-wheel drive models. With sales of the commercial van versions dropping steadily, those versions (Va and Sc, with four-speed manual transmission) were now only built to order.

The 658 cc K6A engine was now also available without a turbocharger, joining the turbocharged version and the familiar 657 cc F6A engines. The HA12 chassis number was for F6A-engined cars; HA22 denotes cars with the K6A engine. For this generation, chassis numbers were the same for front-wheel drive and four-wheel drive models. The turbocharged Works models were available with a 60 PS F6A engine (Alto i.e., 5MT/3AT/4AT and FWD or AWD) or a 64 PS VVT K6A (RS/Z, 5MT/4AT and FWD or AWD). The front-wheel-drive RS/Z was sold with a non-VVT K6A engine when in combination with a 4-speed automatic transmission, it too with a claimed 64 PS. Unique to this generation was a five-door version of the Alto Works. With the December 2000 facelift, the Works versions were discontinued, as the Alto family was realigned strictly as an economy version. The Suzuki Kei Sports picked up the Works' mantle.

Several derivatives were produced from this generation. Suzuki produced two "classic-style" versions: the 1999 Alto C, which combined a deep chrome grille with the curiously shaped headlamps of the Alto Works. This was the first retro-styled Alto, succeeding the previous Cervo C which had been discontinued in 1998. The rather expensive and short-lived Alto C was only available in the five-door bodystyle, it was based on the Alto l'Èpo Turbo and used that model's 60 PS (44 kW) turbocharged engine, coupled to a four-speed automatic transmission. Like most Altos, it could also be had with four-wheel drive.

Mazda also sold the standard Alto as the Carol (Mazda did not offer the Works or the retro-styled models), and Mitsuoka used the Carol as a basis for their Ray.

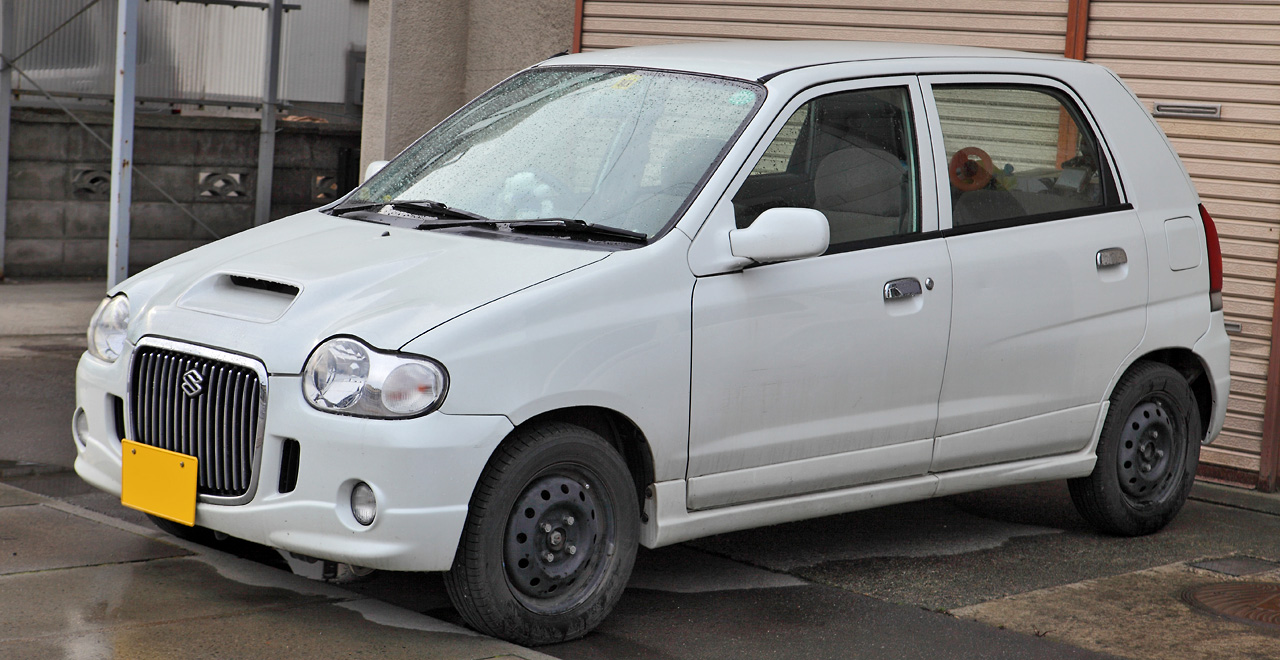
The retro-style Alto C (HA12S)

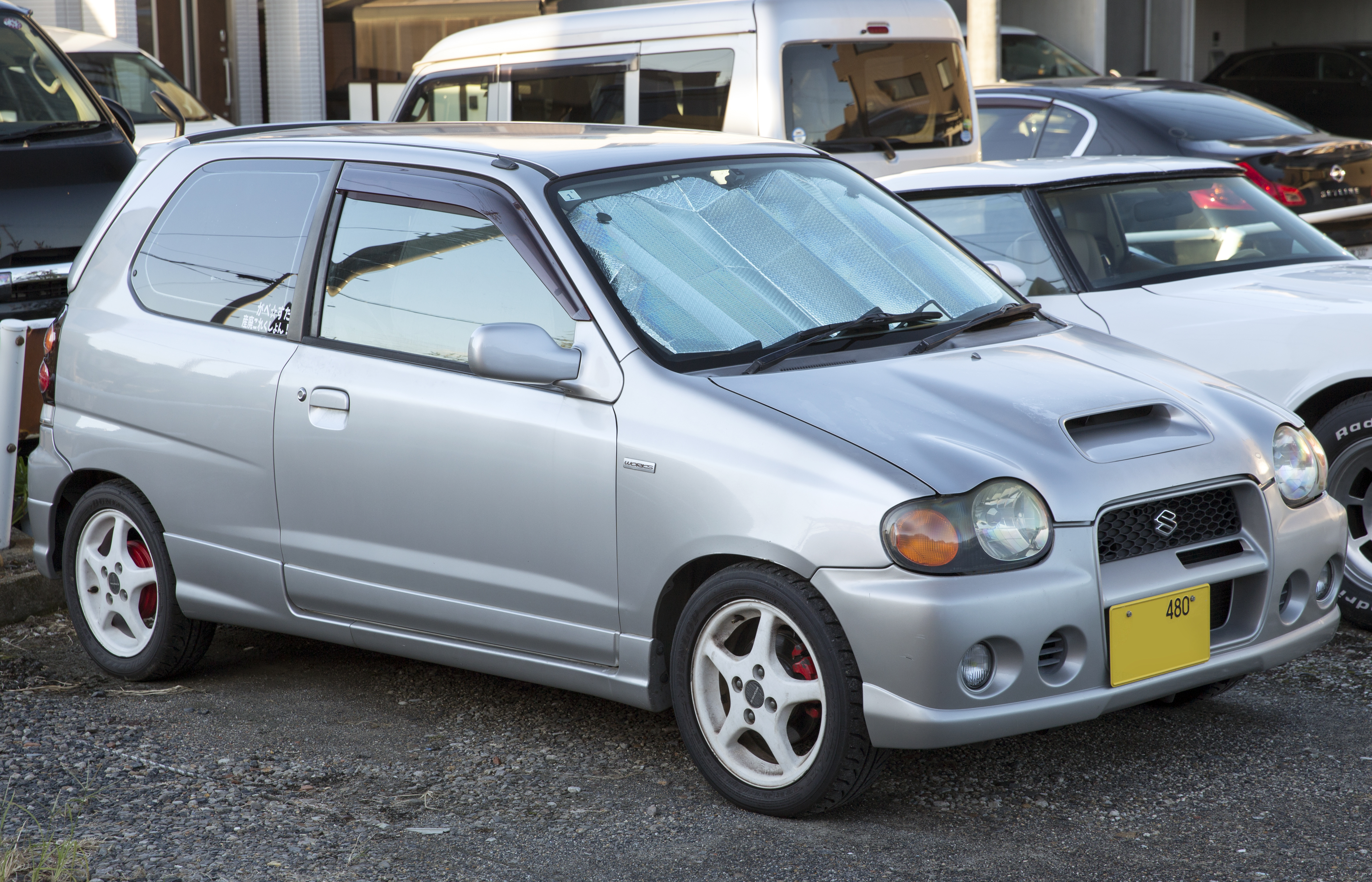
Alto Works RS/Z 3-door (HA22S)

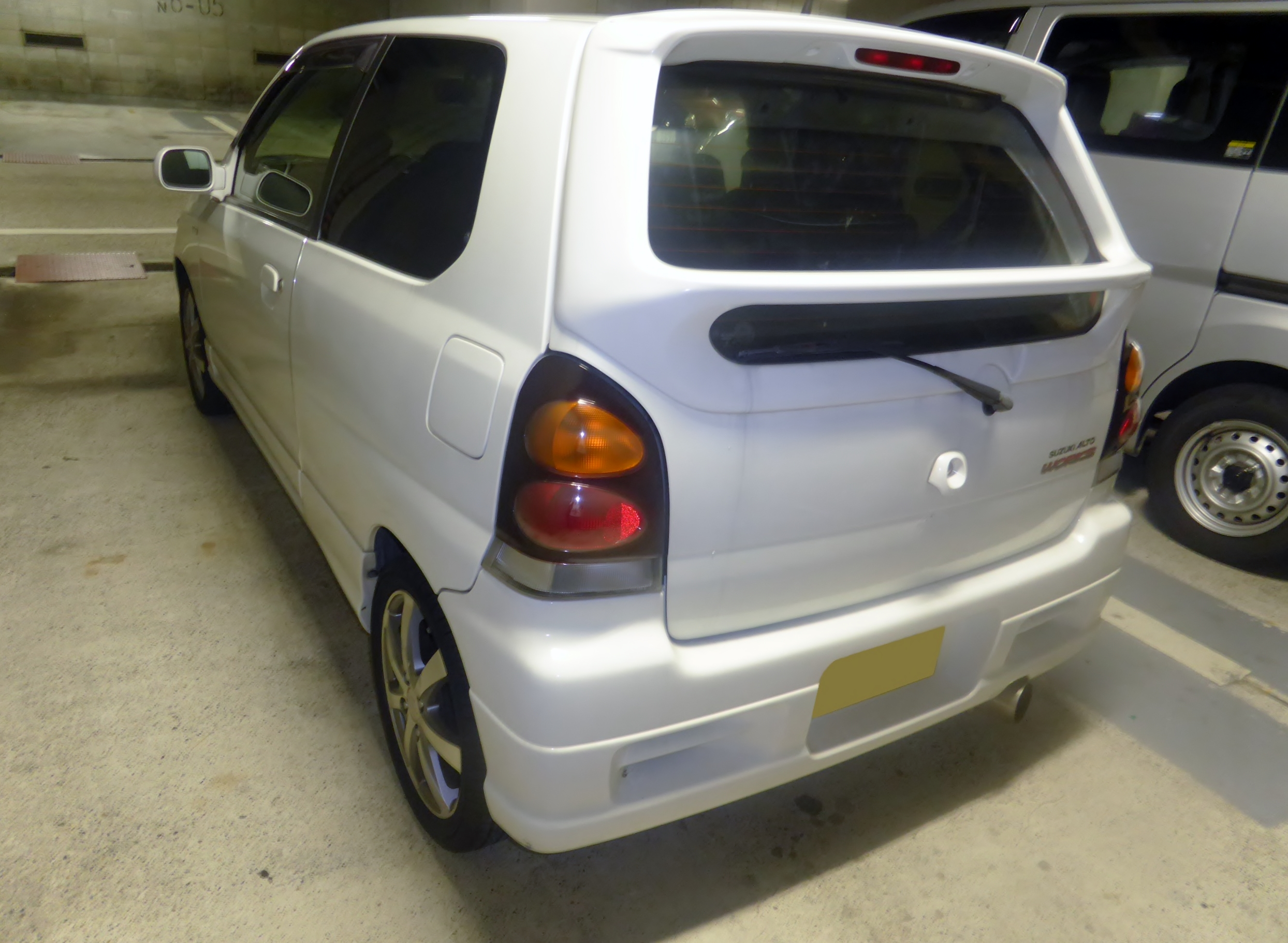
Rear view of Alto Works RS/Z 3-door (HA22S)

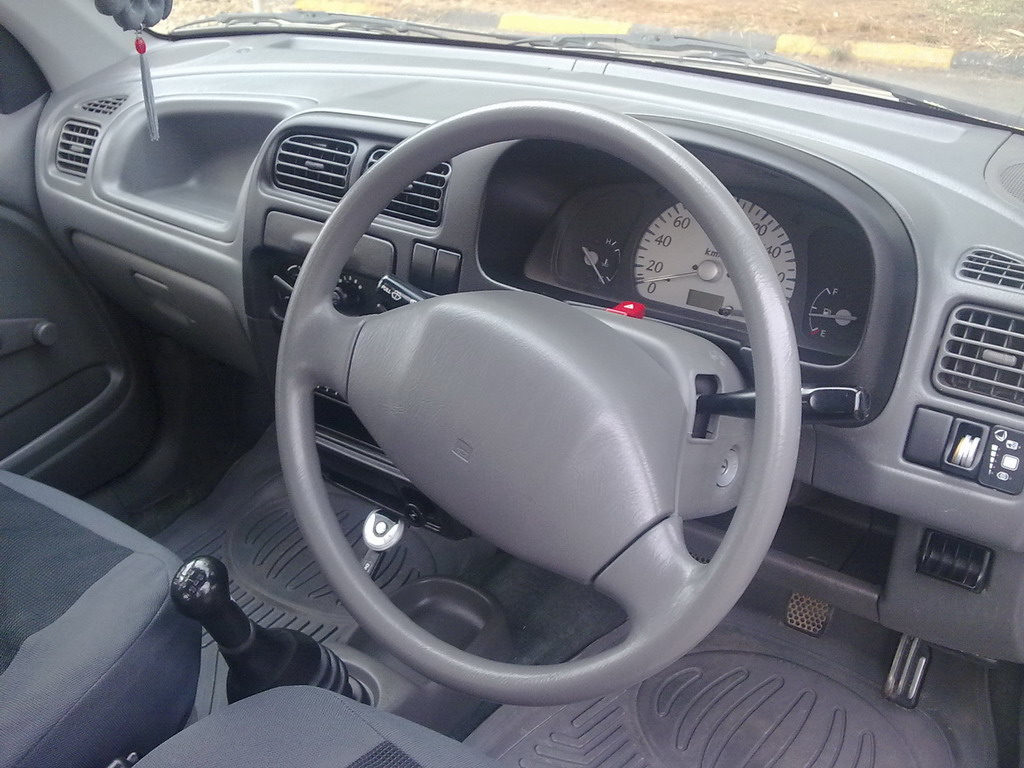
Interior for lower-end models

=== Facelift ===
In December 2000, the fifth generation Alto received a thorough facelift, becoming the HA23. Front- and four-wheel drive models now used the same chassis number. As the Works and all other turbocharged models were discontinued, naturally aspirated versions of the new K6A became the only ones on offer, with either 54 PS (40 kW) or 46 PS (34 kW) in an especially efficient lean burn iteration of the Alto l'Èpo. The K6A met the MLIT requirements to be classified as an "excellent low emissions vehicle".

Front- or four-wheel-drive, manual and automatic transmissions were available (no more CVT), in either a 3- or 5-door hatchback body. A 3-door van version remained available. The Alto received another update in April 2002, when double airbags were made standard on passenger models. At the same time, a naturally aspirated, VVT variant of the K6A engine was added to the l'Èpo (5-door sedan) and VI (3-door van); this model was classified as an "Ultra-Low Emission" vehicle and benefitted from certain tax advantages as a result. The VVT version had the same maximum power, but did have some more torque, 6.4 kg⋅m (63 N⋅m; 46 lb⋅ft) at 3,500 rpm rather than the regular engine's 6.2 kg⋅m (61 N⋅m; 45 lb⋅ft) at 4,000 rpm. Passenger model production was discontinued in August 2004 to make room for the succeeding generation, but a decontented Van version was kept in production until January 2005. These forwent the VVT system and the automatic only had three forward speeds rather than four as before.

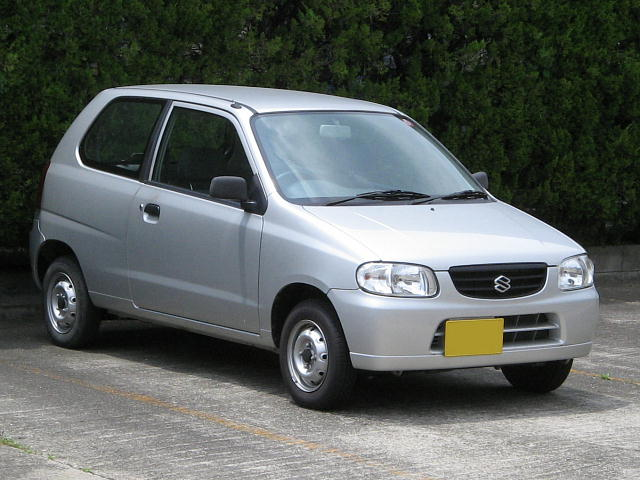
Suzuki Alto Van (HA23V)

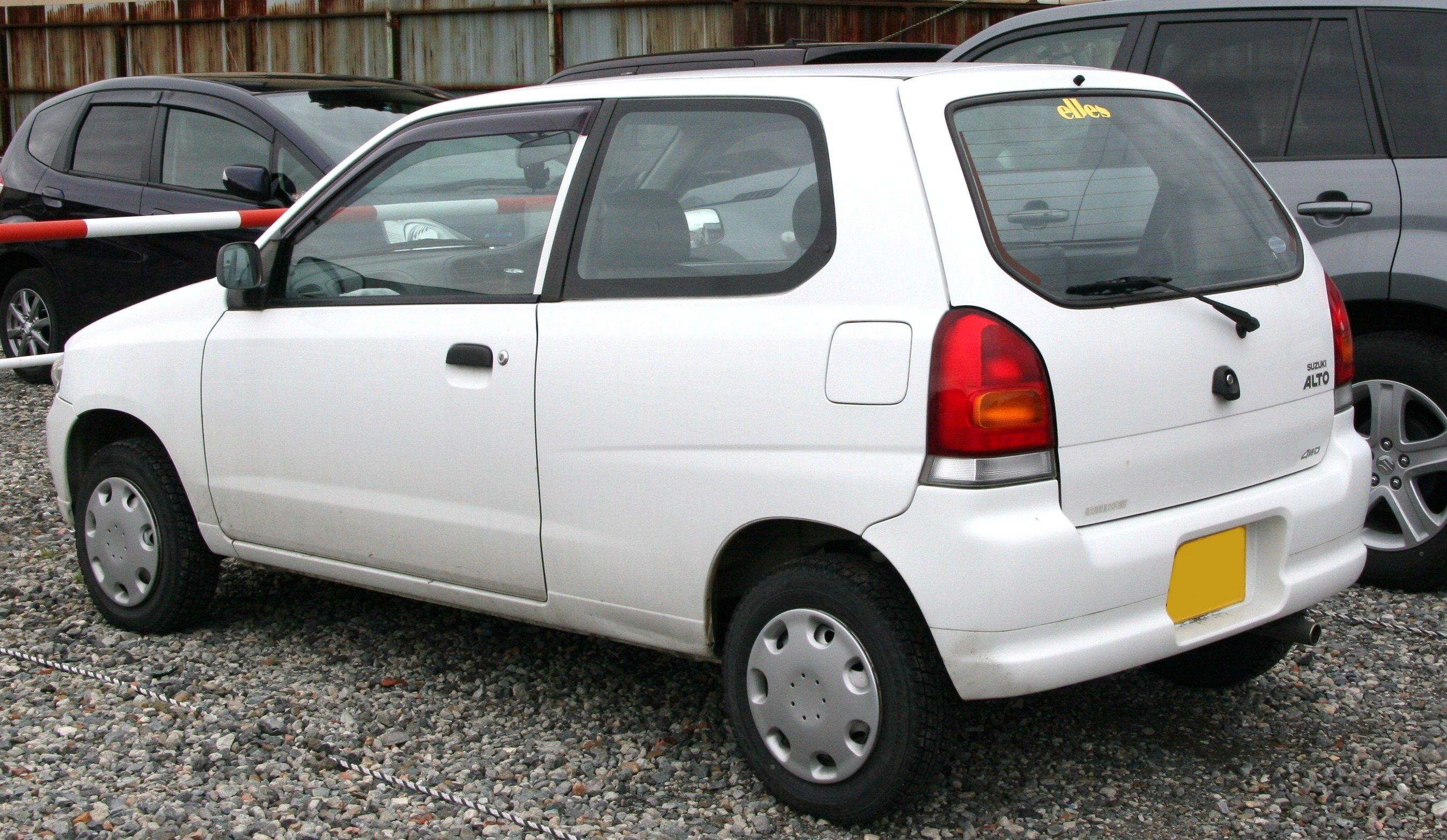
Rear view of facelifted Alto 3-door 4WD (HA23S)

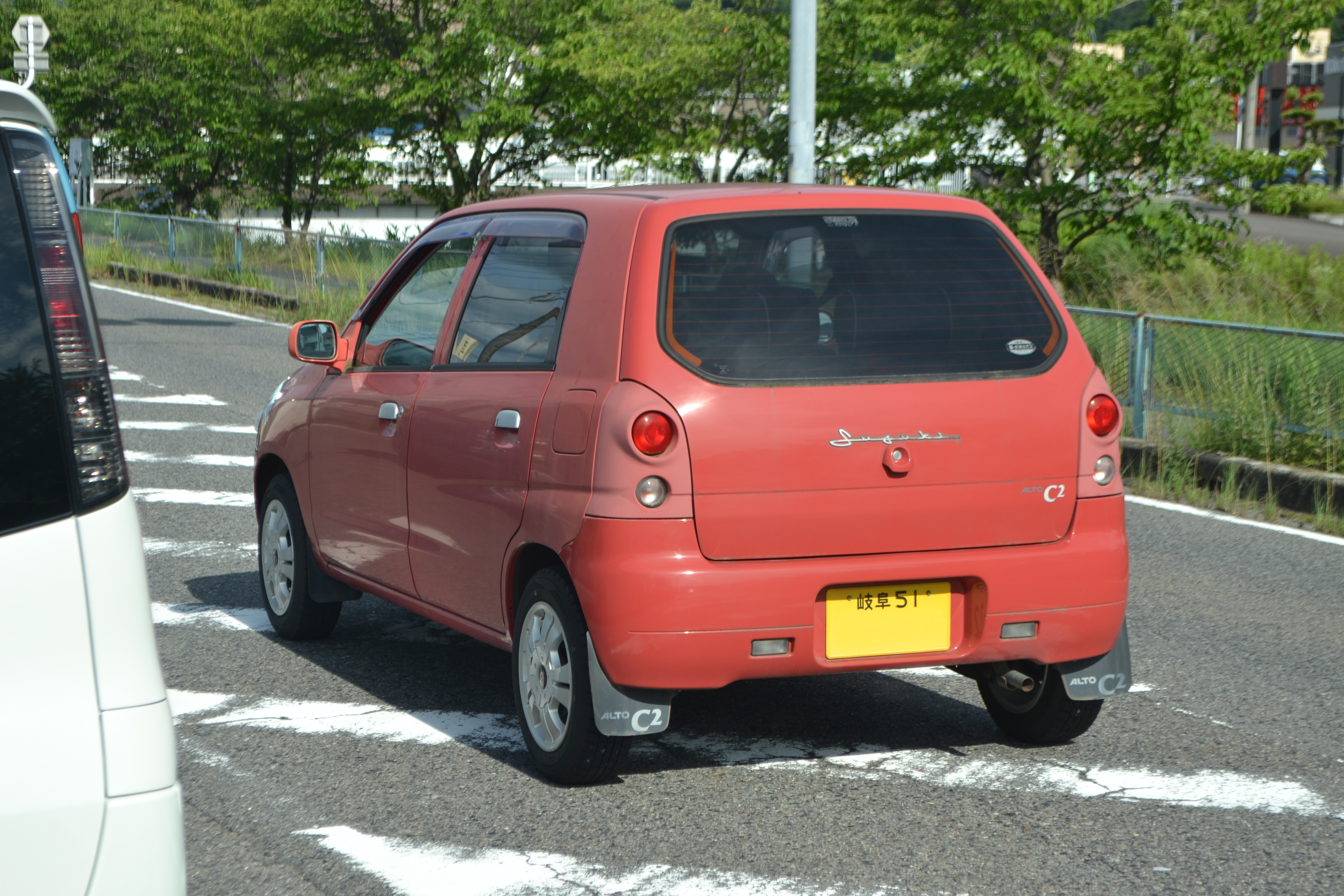
Rear view of the retro-styled Alto C2, which received a reworked front and rear

==== Alto C2 ====
The retro-style Alto C was also discontinued with the facelift, but in February 2001 a new retro version was introduced, the Alto C2. Unlike the earlier C, this one had circular main lamps set in silver surrounds and received much less chrome detailing than the earlier version, although it did use a 1960's, chromed Suzuki script logo on the rear and on the front grille. It also had a wider grille, and its "pop-retro" look was less ornate than the rather baroque Alto C. The C2 also had a less powerful, naturally aspirated engine, and was decontented in other ways, such as receiving a three-speed automatic rather than the Alto C's four-speed unit. It was only available in a single grade, with five doors, a three-speed automatic, the 54 PS (40 kW) K6A engine, and either front- or four-wheel drive. The Alto C2's design language, while not a sales success, did foreshadow the look of the later Alto Lapin. The Alto C2 was only built for eleven months, being discontinued in January 2002.

=== In other markets ===
This model also entered production in India as the Maruti Suzuki Alto (model code RF) in September 2000 and was built there until 2014. From 2002 until 2009 Maruti-built Altos were exported to Europe as Suzuki Altos; sales continued in Latin America and other markets until the next generation Maruti Alto took over in 2012. The car is powered with 0.8-litre F8D three-cylinder and 1.1-litre F10D four-cylinder engines with fuel injection.

Pakistani production began in 2000 utilizing the old carburetted 1.0-litre F10A four-cylinder engine and also available with CNG variant. The production was halted in 2012.

Beginning in mid-1999, and originally imported from Japan, the car was also sold in Colombia as the Chevrolet Alto. As the market for two-door cars was minimal in Colombia, it was only available with five doors. The Colombian model was equipped with a one-litre, sixteen-valve inline-four engine with 65 PS (48 kW) at 6500 rpm, an engine it shared with the locally made Chevrolet Wagon R+. GM Colmotores began building it themselves in 2000 and kept it in production until 2003. The Chevrolet Alto was also exported to Ecuador.

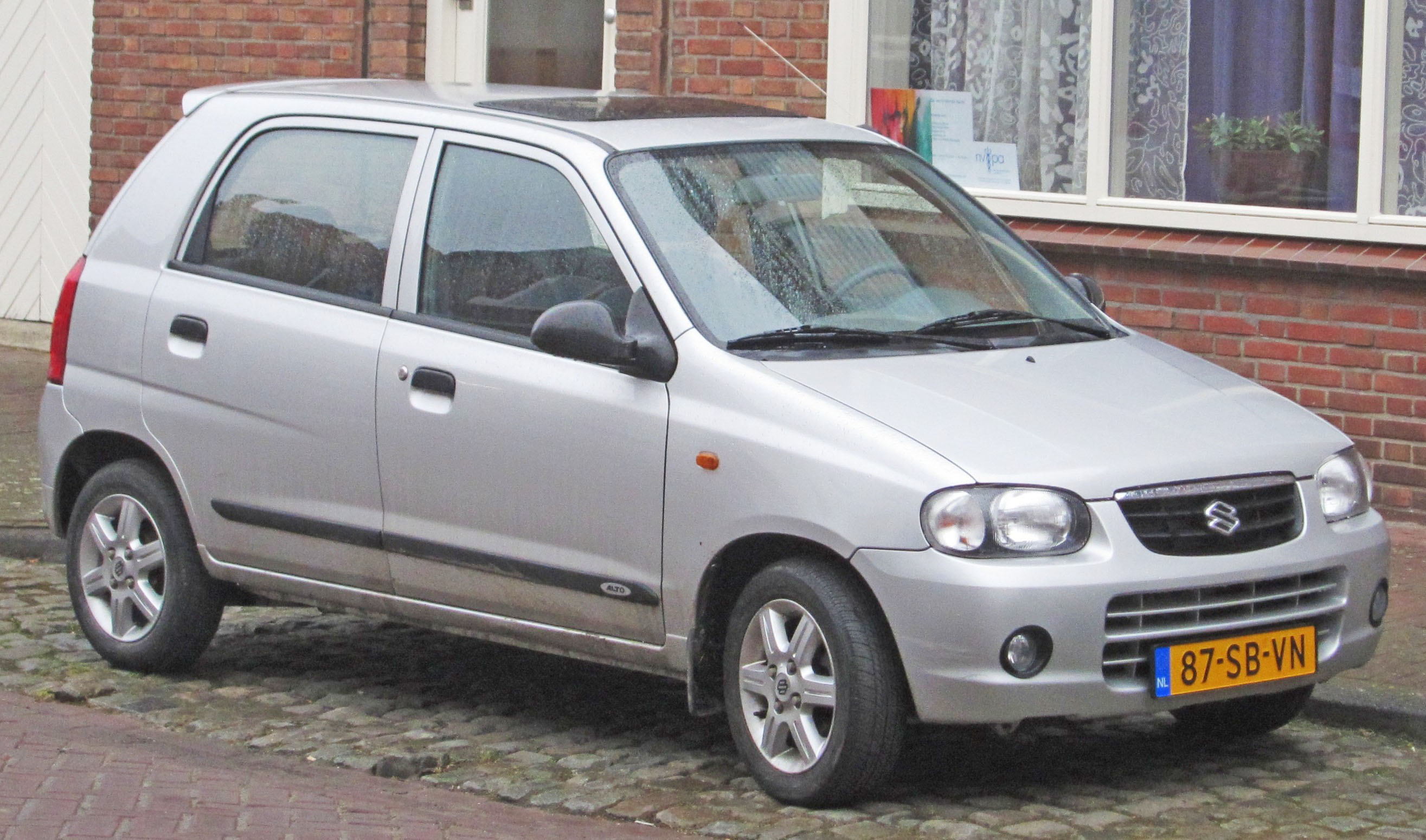
European market Suzuki Alto 1.1 (The Netherlands)

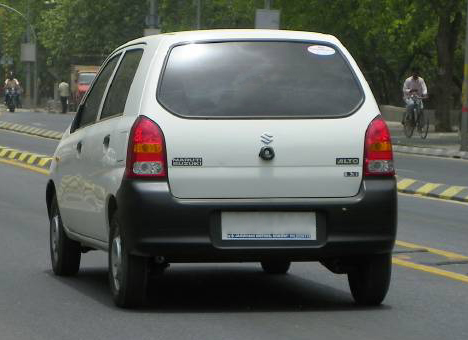
Maruti Suzuki Alto (India)

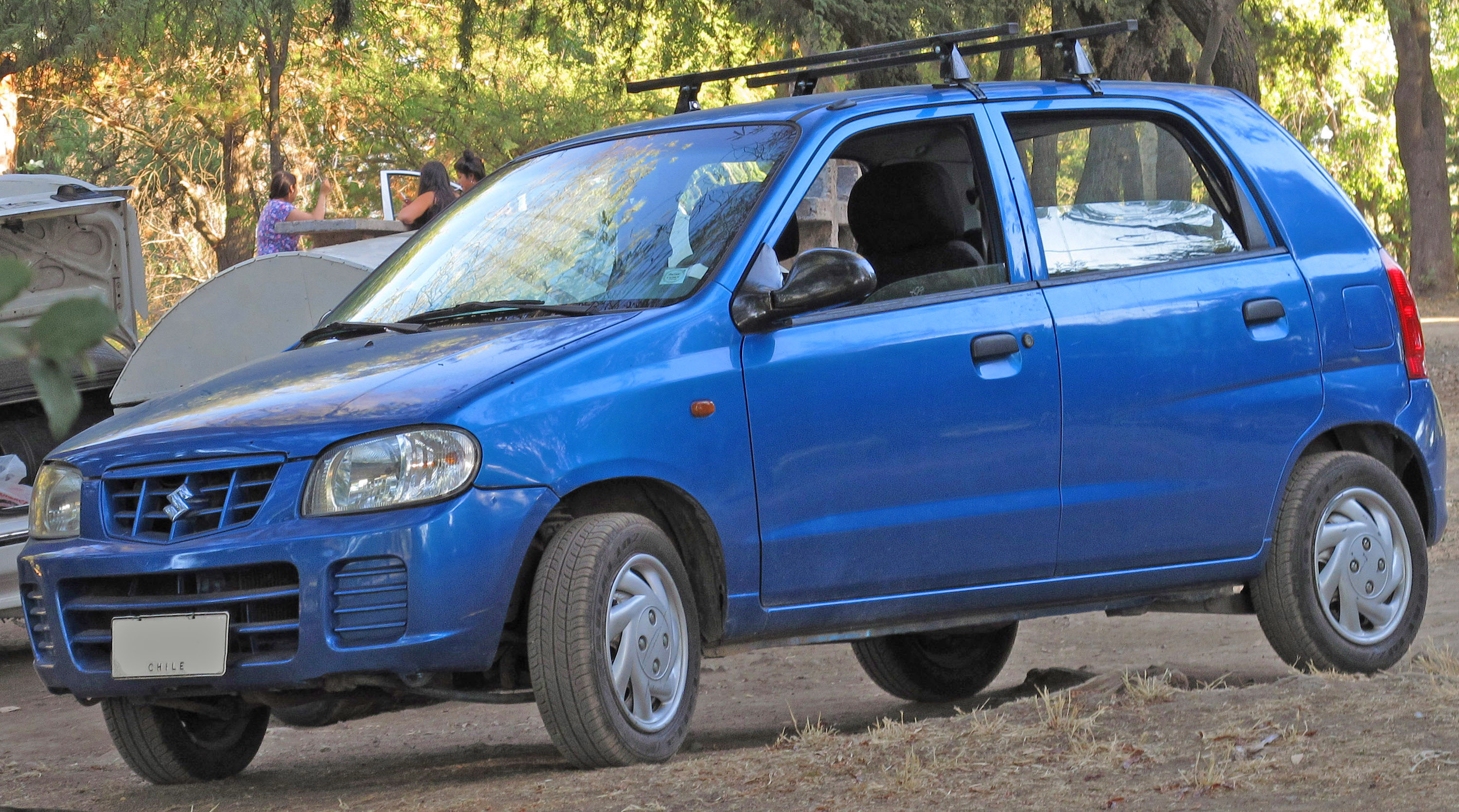
Facelifted Alto 800 (Chile)

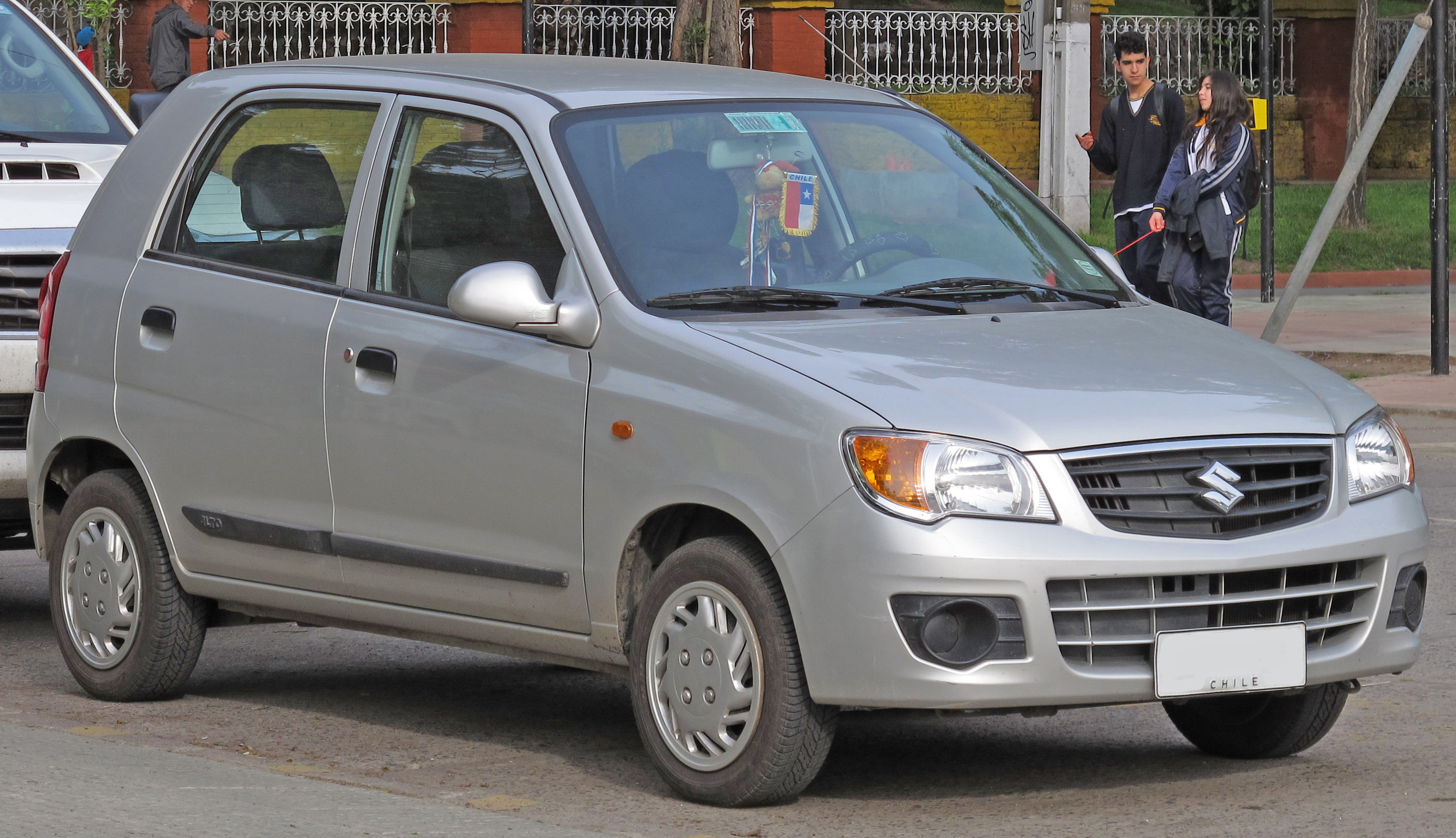
Alto K10 (Chile)

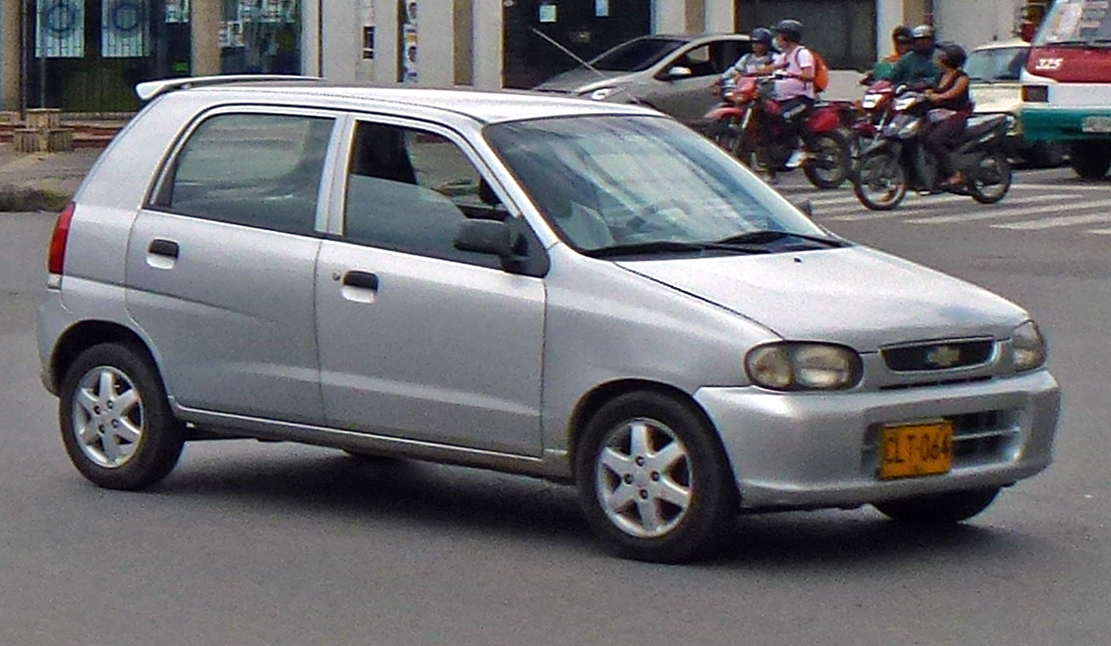
Chevrolet Alto (Colombia)

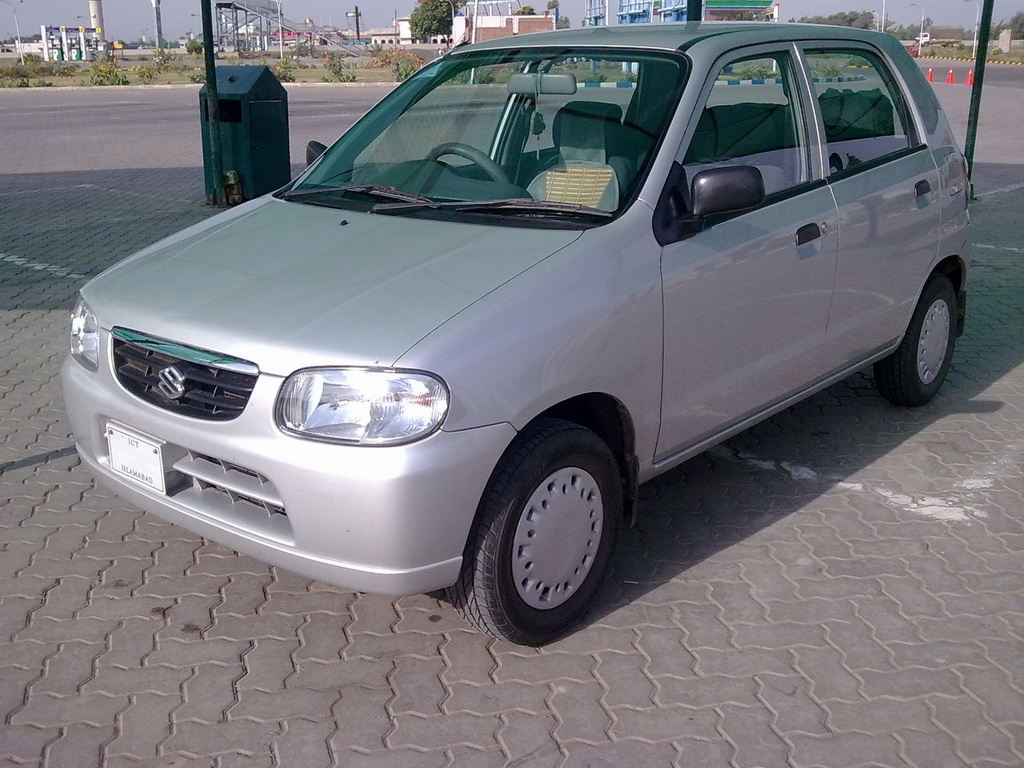
Alto 1.0 (Pakistan)

=== Safety ===
Latin NCAP 1.5 test results Suzuki Alto K10 - NO Airbags (2013, similar to Euro NCAP 2002)
Test	Points	Stars
Adult occupant:	0.00/17.0	0 /5 stars
Child occupant:	25.00/49.00	3 /5 stars

== Sixth generation (2004) ==
Sixth generation
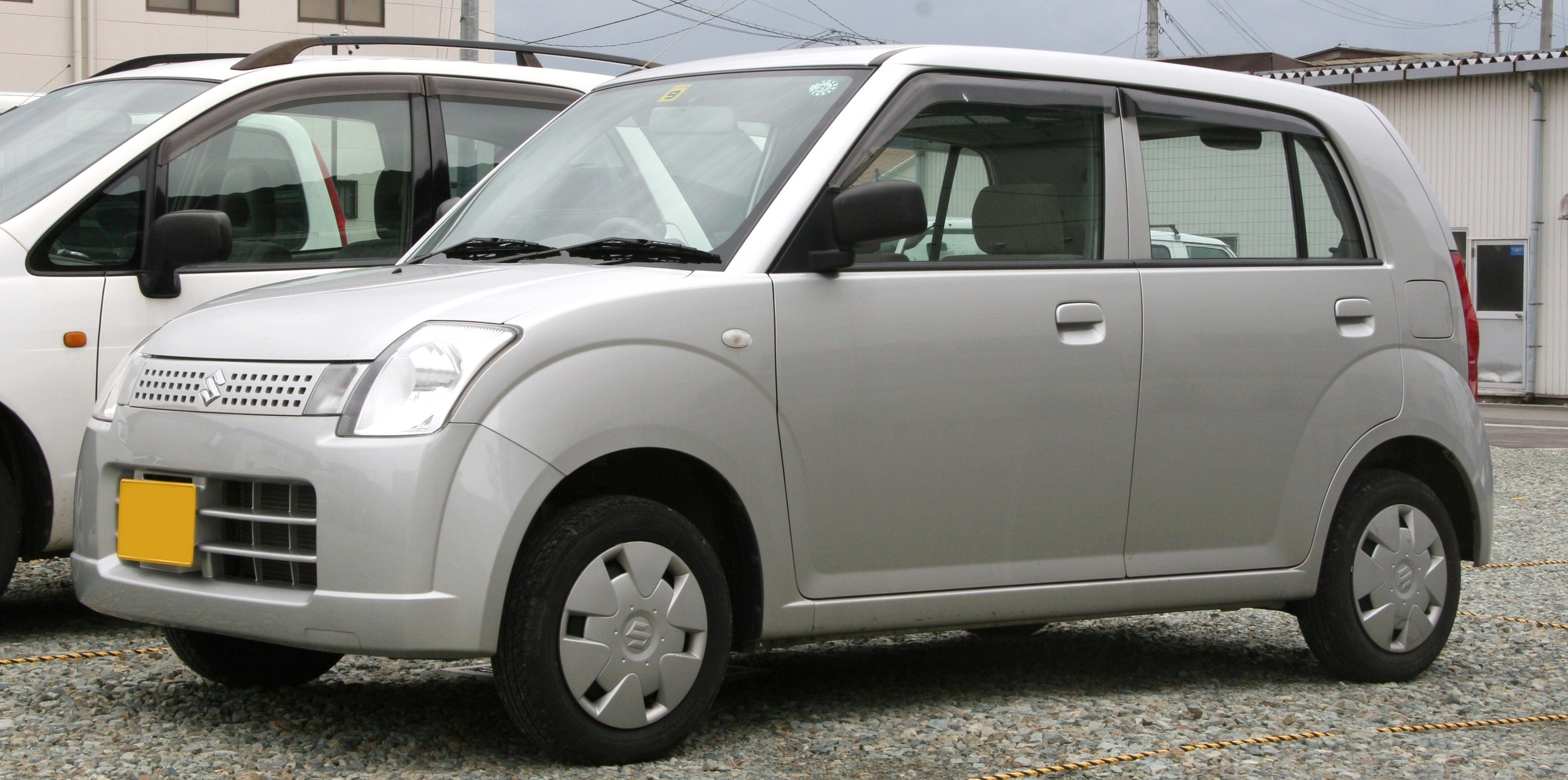
- 2004–2006 Suzuki Alto

Overview
- Model code: HA24
- Also called: Mazda Carol; Nissan Pino
- Production: 2004–2009
- Assembly: Japan: Kosai, Shizuoka

Body and chassis
- Body style: 5-door hatchback
- Layout: Front-engine, front-wheel-drive or four-wheel-drive

Powertrain
- Engine: 658 cc K6A I3
- Transmission: 5-speed manual; 3/4-speed automatic

Dimensions
- Wheelbase: 2,360 mm (92.9 in)
- Length: 3,395 mm (133.7 in)
- Width: 1,475 mm (58.1 in)
- Height: 1,500–1,510 mm (59.1–59.4 in)
- Curb weight: 720–810 kg (1,590–1,790 lb)

The sixth-generation Alto (HA24) was introduced in September 2004. The bonnet and headlamps curved down at the front, giving a similar effect to the Toyota WiLL Vi or the Citroën C2. The Alto was realigned as a less costly car to accommodate new models such as the Cervo and Alto Lapin. The more powerful engines were moved into the other more upmarket versions like the Suzuki Kei Works and Alto Lapin SS, leaving the Alto with only a 54 PS (53 hp; 40 kW) version. In Japan, this version of the Alto was not only rebadged as the Mazda Carol, but also by Nissan as the Pino. Production continued until December 2009, when it was replaced by the next generation.

The Alto Van (HA24V) appeared a few months later, in January 2005. There was no three-door variant of this generation, which meant the return of a five-door Alto Van (for the first time since 1989). It was only available in Superior White, but front driver and passenger airbags were now standard. The initial equipment level was the VS; this was joined by the VP in May 2005. The VP has central locking and keyless entry. The lower priced VS model was discontinued in April 2009, leaving only the VP for the final eight months of production.

=== Gallery ===
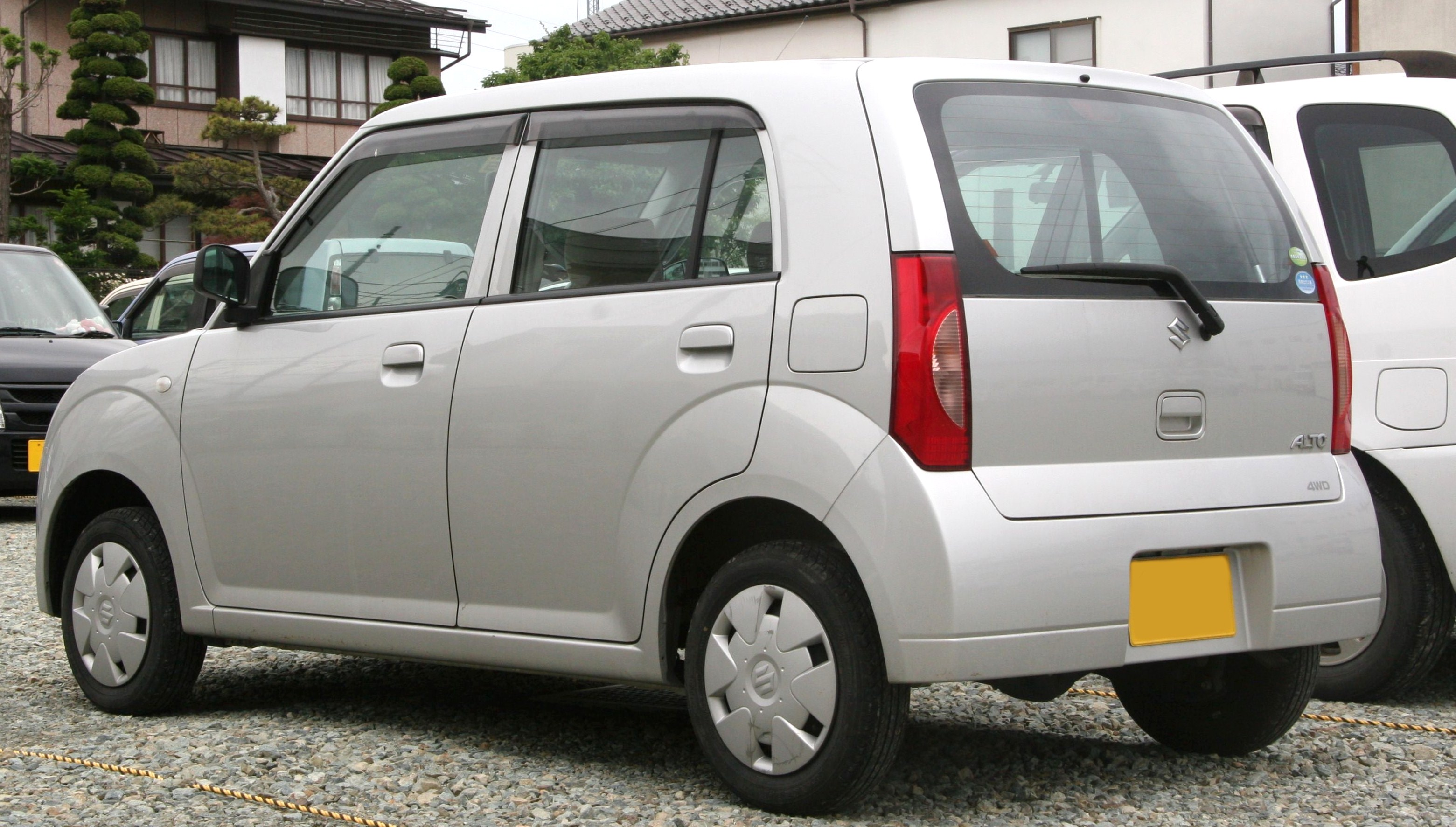
Rear view

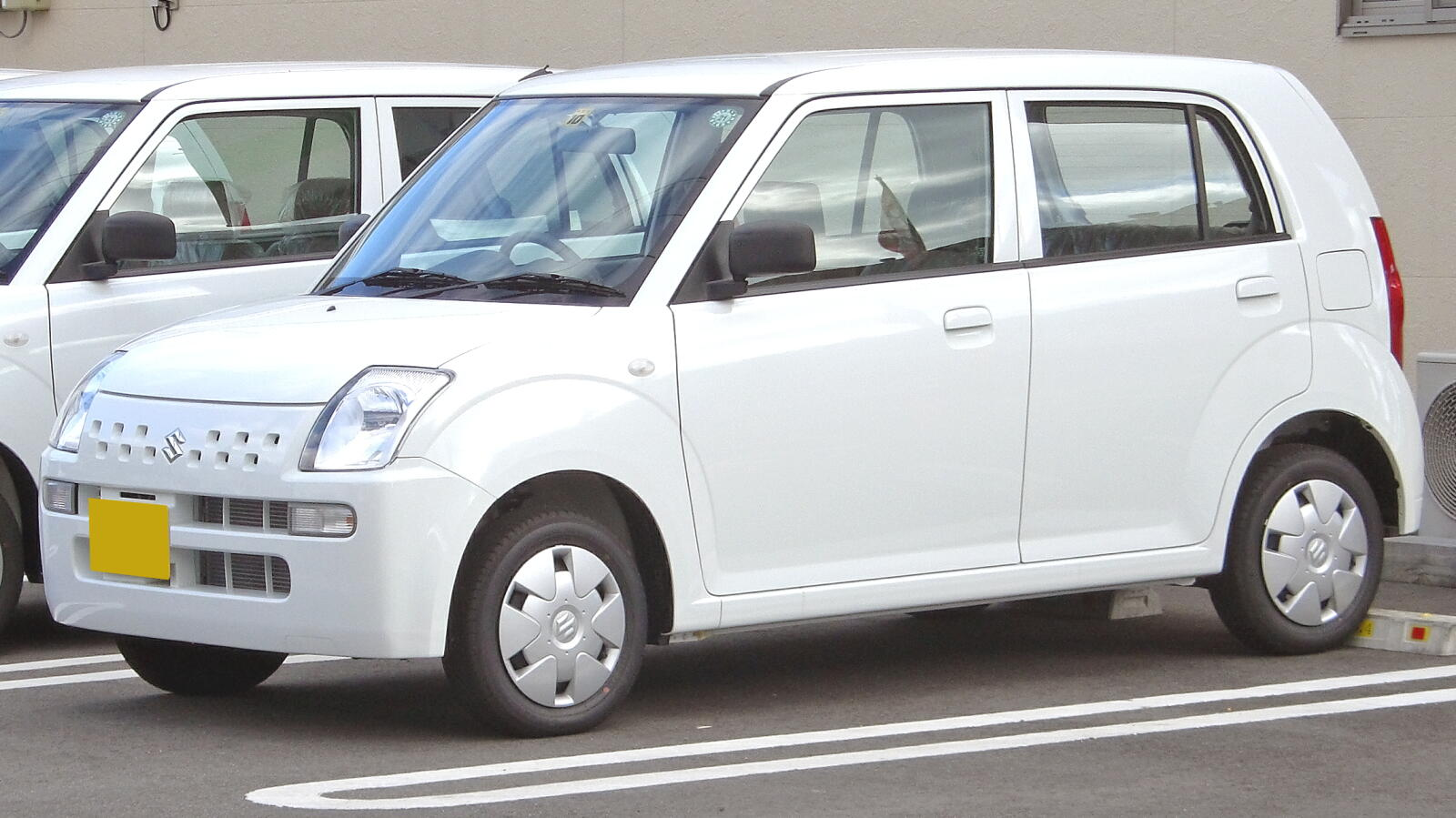
2006–2009 Suzuki Alto

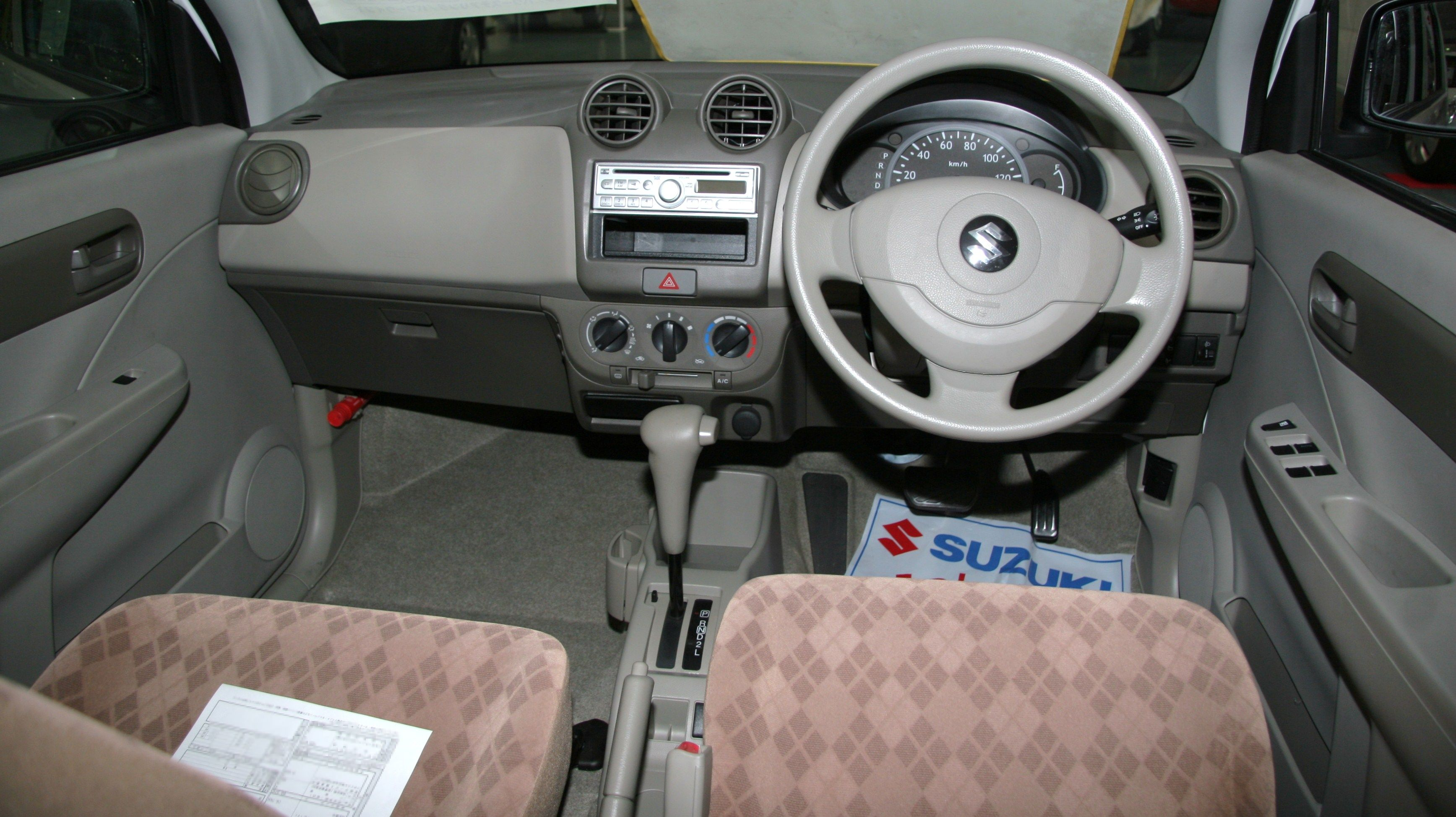
Interior

== Seventh generation (2009) ==
=== Japan ===
Seventh generation
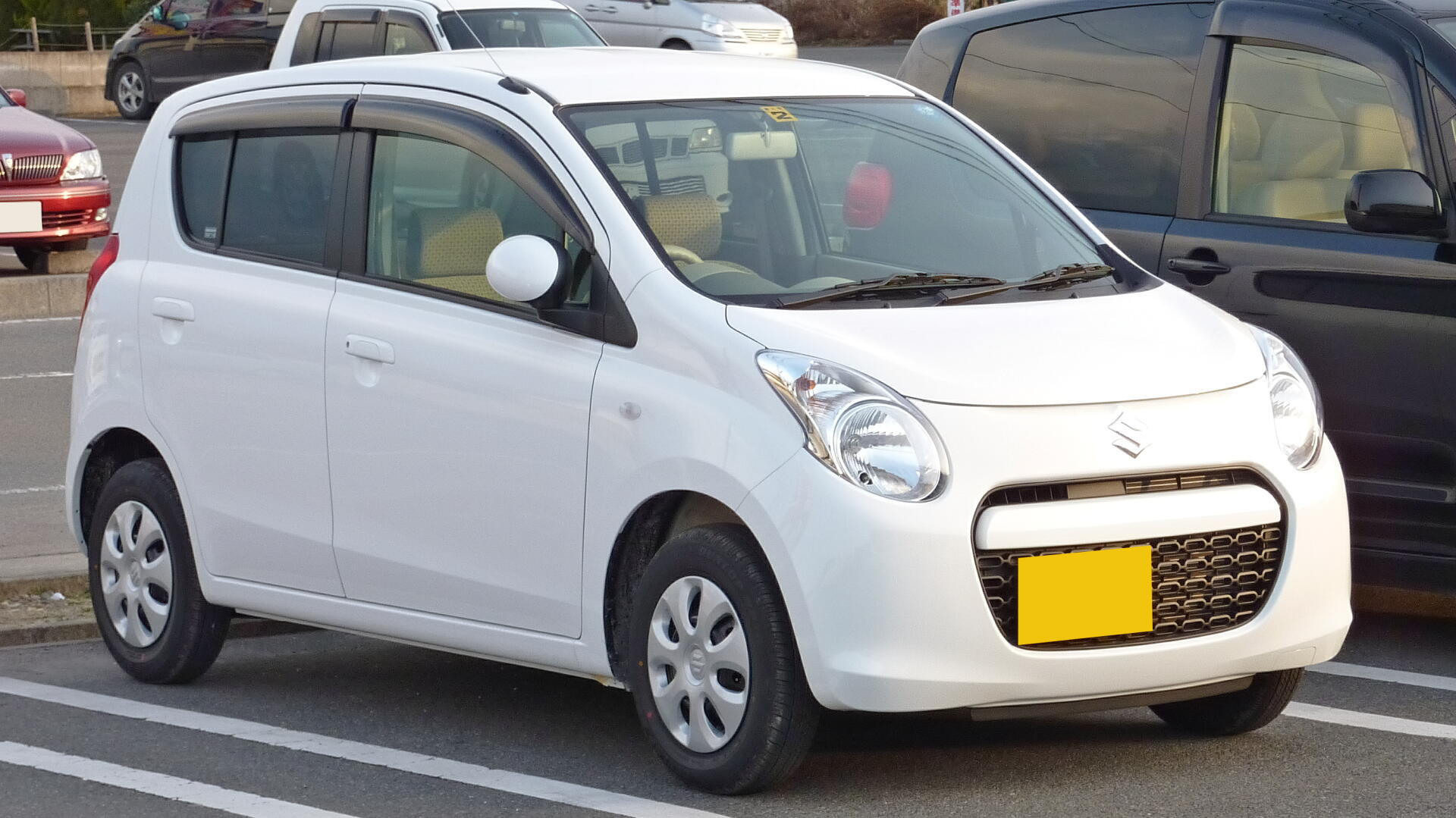
- 2010 Suzuki Alto

Overview
- Model code: HA25/HA35
- Also called: Mazda Carol
- Production: 2009–2014
- Assembly: Japan: Kosai, Shizuoka

Body and chassis
- Body style: 5-door hatchback
- Layout: Front-engine, front-wheel-drive or four-wheel-drive

Powertrain
- Engine: 658 cc K6A I3 (HA25); 658 cc R06A I3 (HA35)
- Transmission: 5-speed manual 4-speed automatic CVT

Dimensions
- Wheelbase: 2,400 mm (94.5 in)
- Length: 3,395 mm (133.7 in)
- Width: 1,475 mm (58.1 in)
- Height: 1,535 mm (60.4 in)

The seventh-generation Alto was first shown at the 2009 Tokyo Motor Show alongside its sister car, the Mazda Carol. It is available with a 660 cc K6A engine, a 5-speed manual, a 4-speed automatic transmission, or a CVT, in FWD or 4WD variants. Under the Japanese 10-15 test cycle, the front-wheel-drive with CVT achieves 24.5 km/litre fuel economy.

In 2011, Suzuki launched the Alto Eco variant, featuring the new R06A engine lifted from the Suzuki MR Wagon and an idling stop function. With 52 PS (38 kW), it is capable of reaching 30.2 km/L (85 mpg_{‑imp}; 71 mpg_{‑US}) based on Japan's JC08 Mode test cycle (32 km/L under 10-15 test cycle). Other modifications intended to lower fuel consumption include LED taillights and brake light, and a high-efficiency fuel pump. This is .2 km/L higher than the previous class champion, the Daihatsu Mira e:S. The Suzuki "S" emblems and other badging on the Alto Eco are tinted blue; there was also a special edition in 2012 called the ECO-S Eco Blue Package, which had similar blue accents on the rear view mirrors, door handles, and across the interior.

In March 2013, the Alto Eco was updated with the addition of Suzuki's ENE-CHARGE system, first applied to the fifth-generation Wagon R. With this technology, fuel economy has now improved to 33.0 km/L based on Japan's JC08 Mode test cycle. The engine was updated again in December 2013, with the compression ratio increased from 11 to 11.2:1, while friction was decreased and the engine management updated. Fuel consumption increased again, now to 35.0 km/L (99 mpg_{‑imp}; 82 mpg_{‑US}). The blue badging was dropped for this final iteration of the Alto Eco.

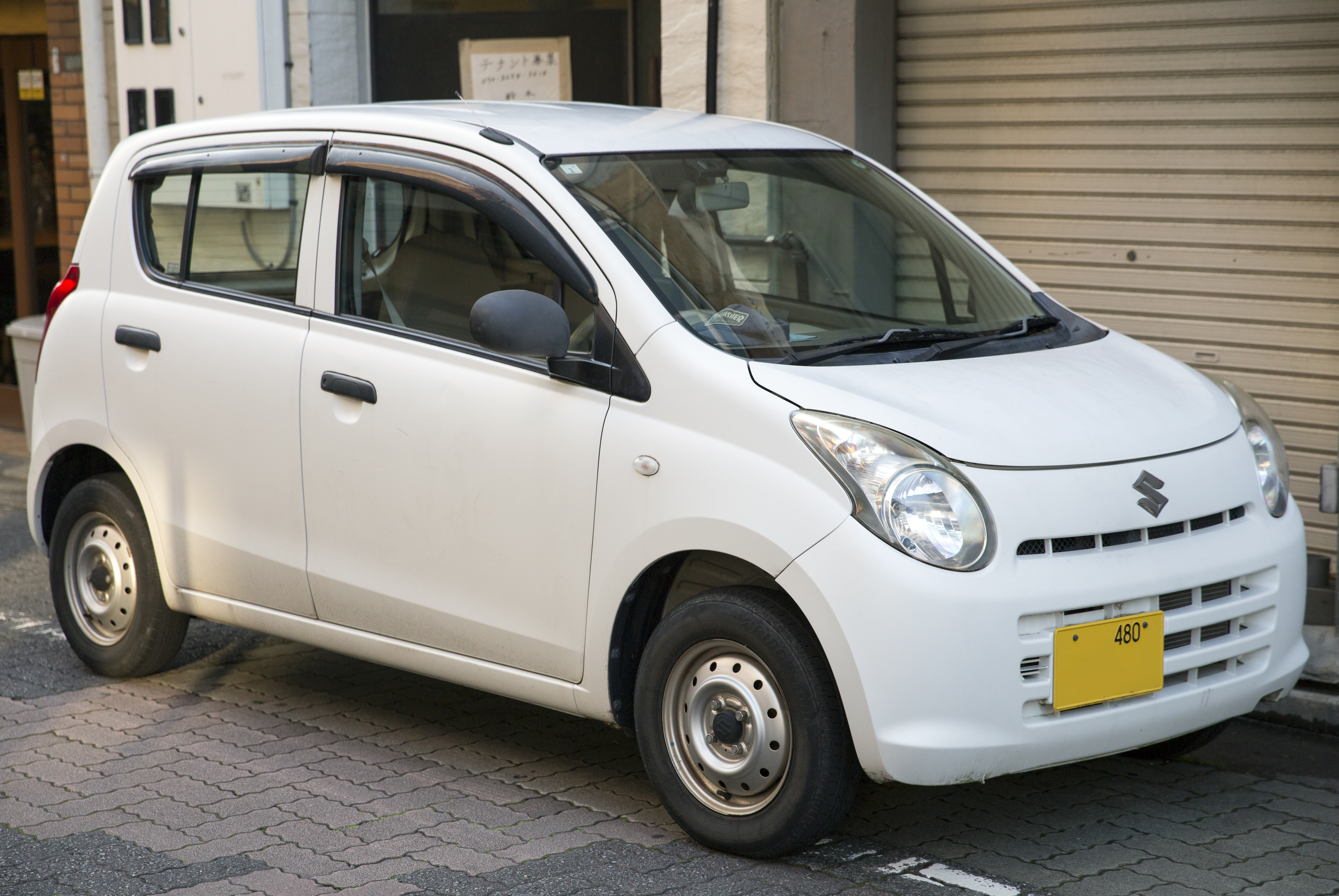
Suzuki Alto Van (HA25V)

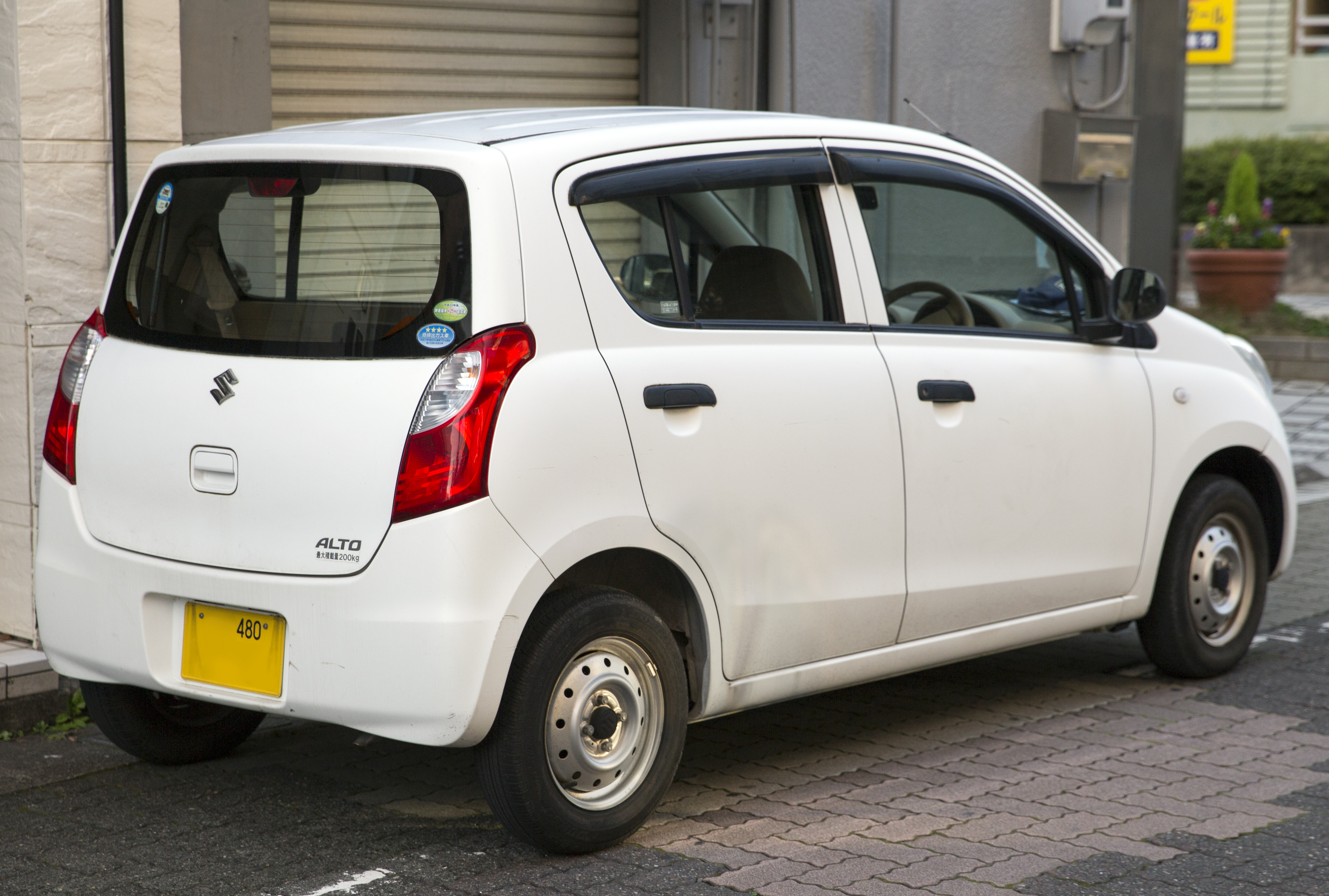
Suzuki Alto Van (HA25V)

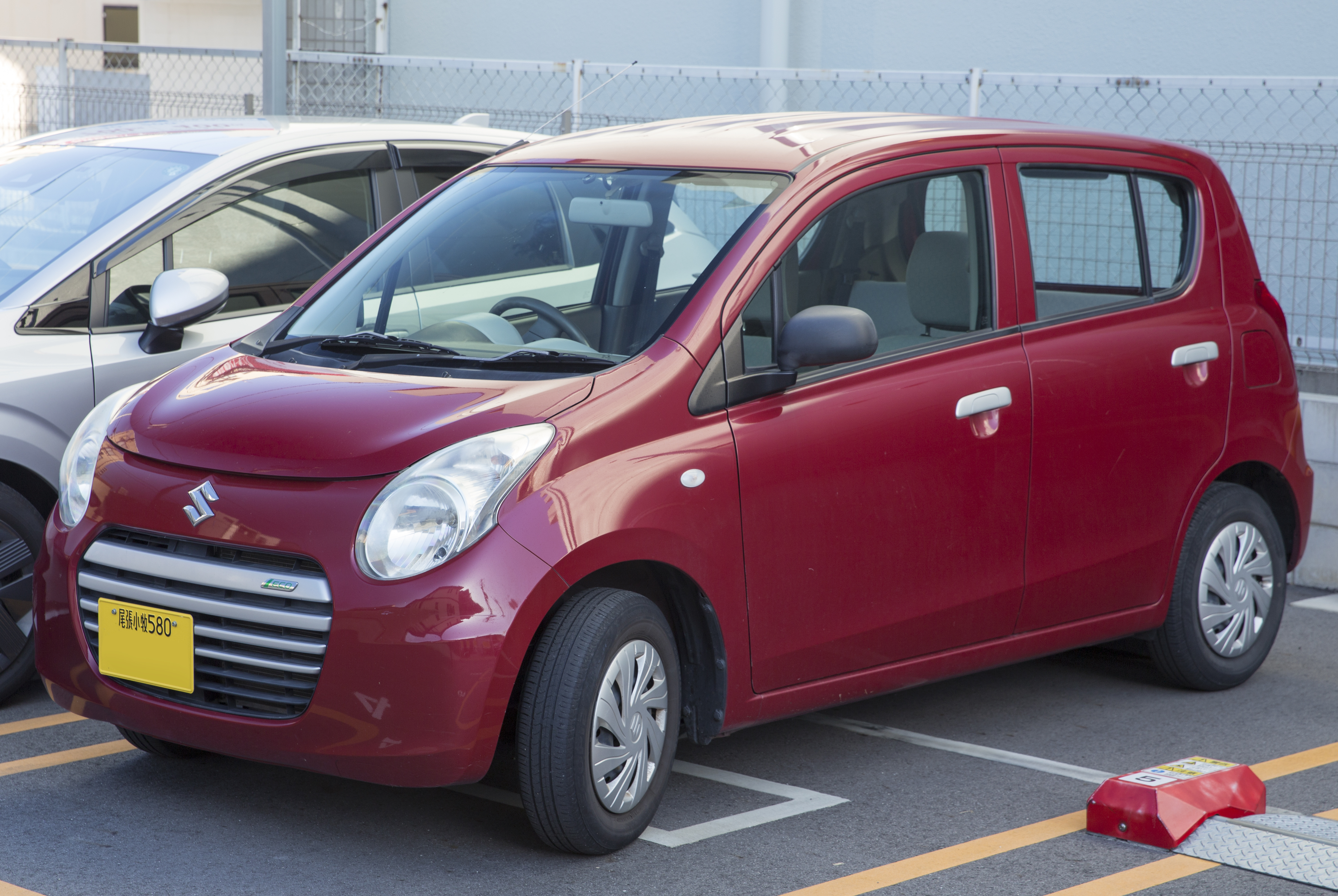
Suzuki Alto Eco-L (HA35S)

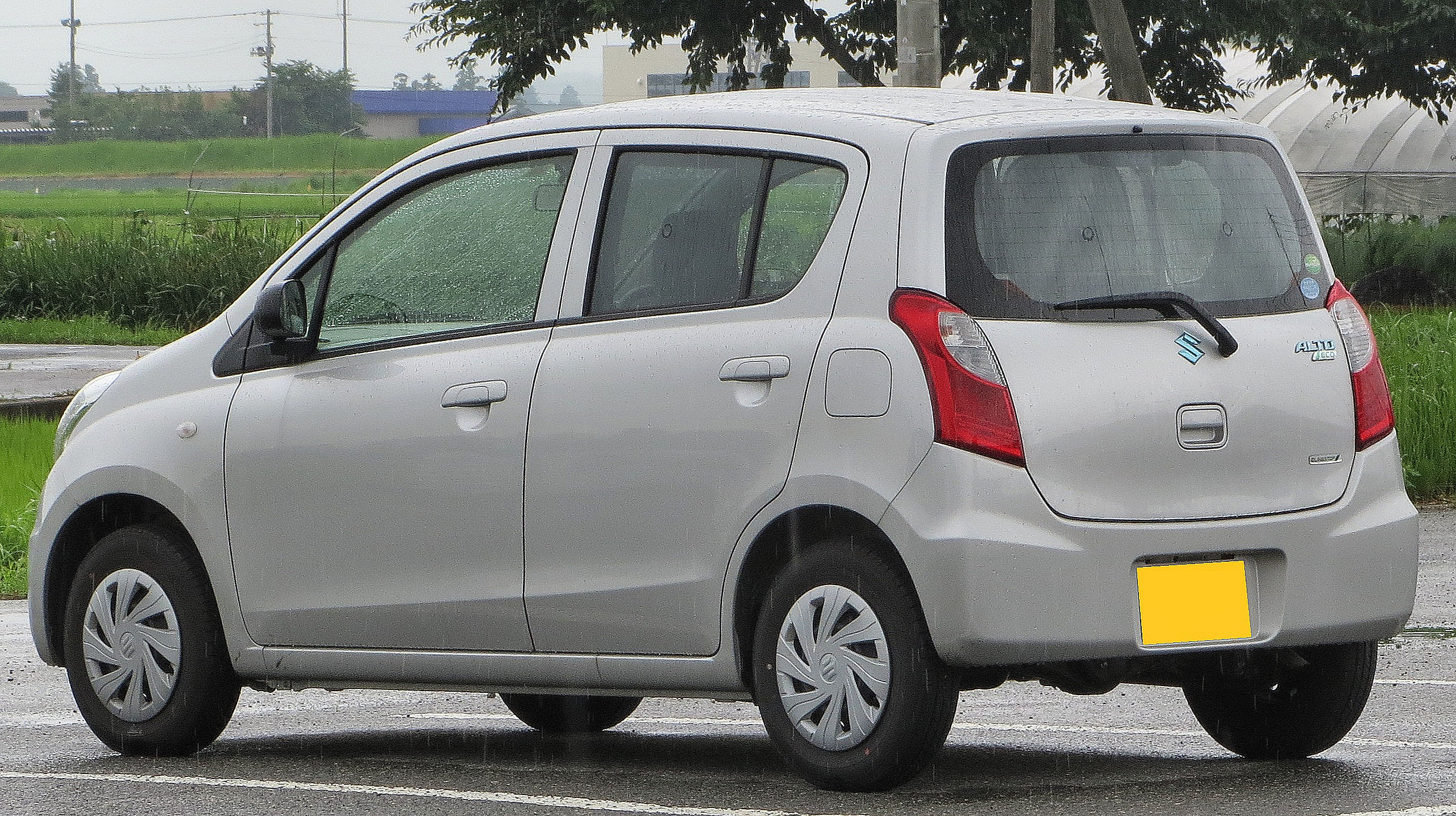
Suzuki Alto Eco-L (HA35S)

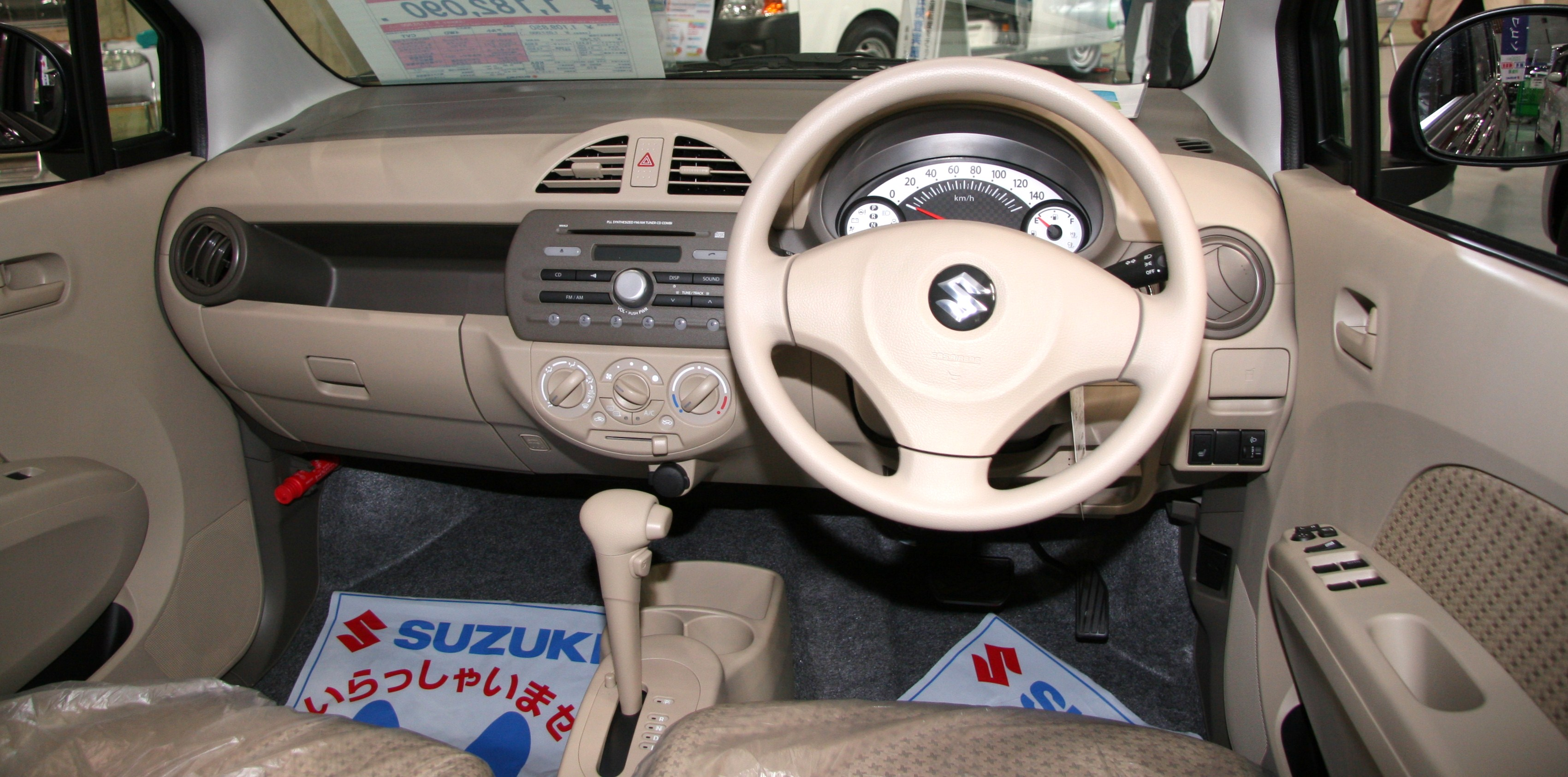
Interior

=== International ===
Maruti Suzuki A-Star
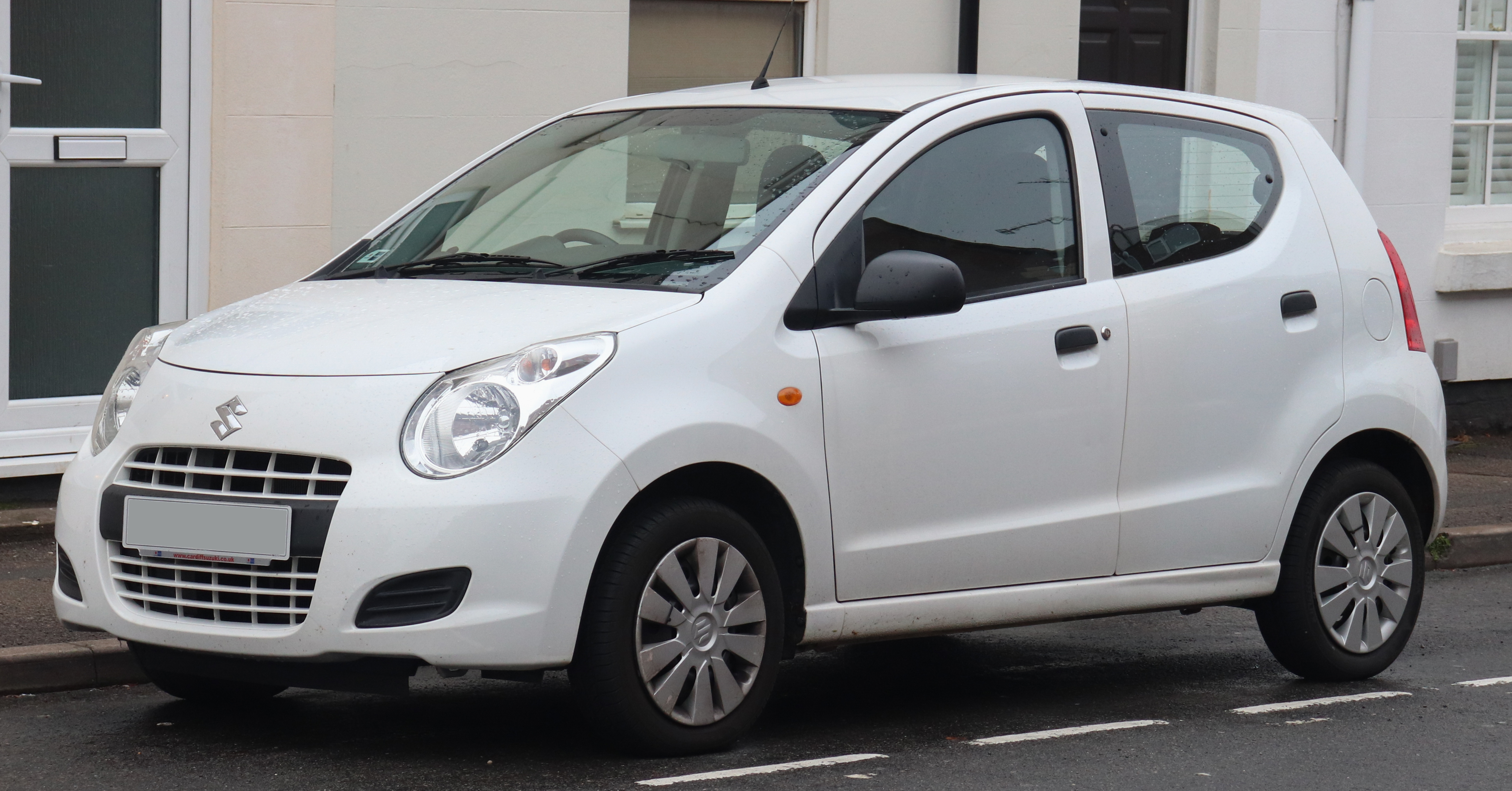
- 2014 Suzuki Alto (GF) SZ (UK)

Overview
- Also called: Suzuki Alto; Suzuki Celerio; Nissan Pixo
- Production: 2008–2014 (India); 2009–2018 (China)
- Assembly: India: Manesar (Maruti Suzuki); China: Chongqing (Changan Suzuki)

Body and chassis
- Class: City car (A)
- Body style: 5-door hatchback
- Layout: Front-engine, front-wheel-drive

Powertrain
- Engine: 998 cc K10B I3
- Transmission: 5-speed manual 4-speed automatic

Dimensions
- Wheelbase: 2,360 mm (92.9 in)
- Length: 3,580 mm (140.9 in)
- Width: 1,680 mm (66.1 in)
- Height: 1,400 mm (55.1 in)

Chronology
- Predecessor: Maruti Alto (India)
- Successor: Suzuki Celerio (Asia); Nissan Pixo (Europe)

The Suzuki Alto available in international markets is known in India as the Maruti Suzuki A-Star (short for "Alto-Star"), but is also known as the Suzuki Celerio in some other countries. It was launched in December 2008 by Suzuki's Indian subsidiary Maruti Suzuki.

It is actually a different car from the Japanese market one although they share the same name. The car is manufactured exclusively in Haryana, India, and is exported worldwide. It is available in some European markets with a somewhat different front end than the Nissan Pixo. The car was rolled out to Indian customers in December 2008 and exports began in April 2009.

With a new body and engine, Maruti hopes to bring freshness to the Indian car market, of which it already holds a major share. The 998 cc (60.9 cu in) K10B inline-three engine was developed especially for the new car, and is also used for the Nissan Pixo. The A-Star has a new dashboard, with an available unique protruding tachometer besides the meter cowl (only in the ZXi trim).

In February 2014, Maruti Suzuki unveiled an all-new Celerio, which replaces the A-Star and Zen Estilo.

The European market version of the Maruti Suzuki A-Star was unveiled at the 2008 Paris Motor Show. It was developed to be a global car and will be made at Maruti Suzuki's plant in Manesar, Haryana, India. It is stylistically based on the Suzuki A-Star Concept. The Alto was conceived as a response to high petrol prices and global warming. It was released as an eco-friendly car priced from £6,795 OTR.

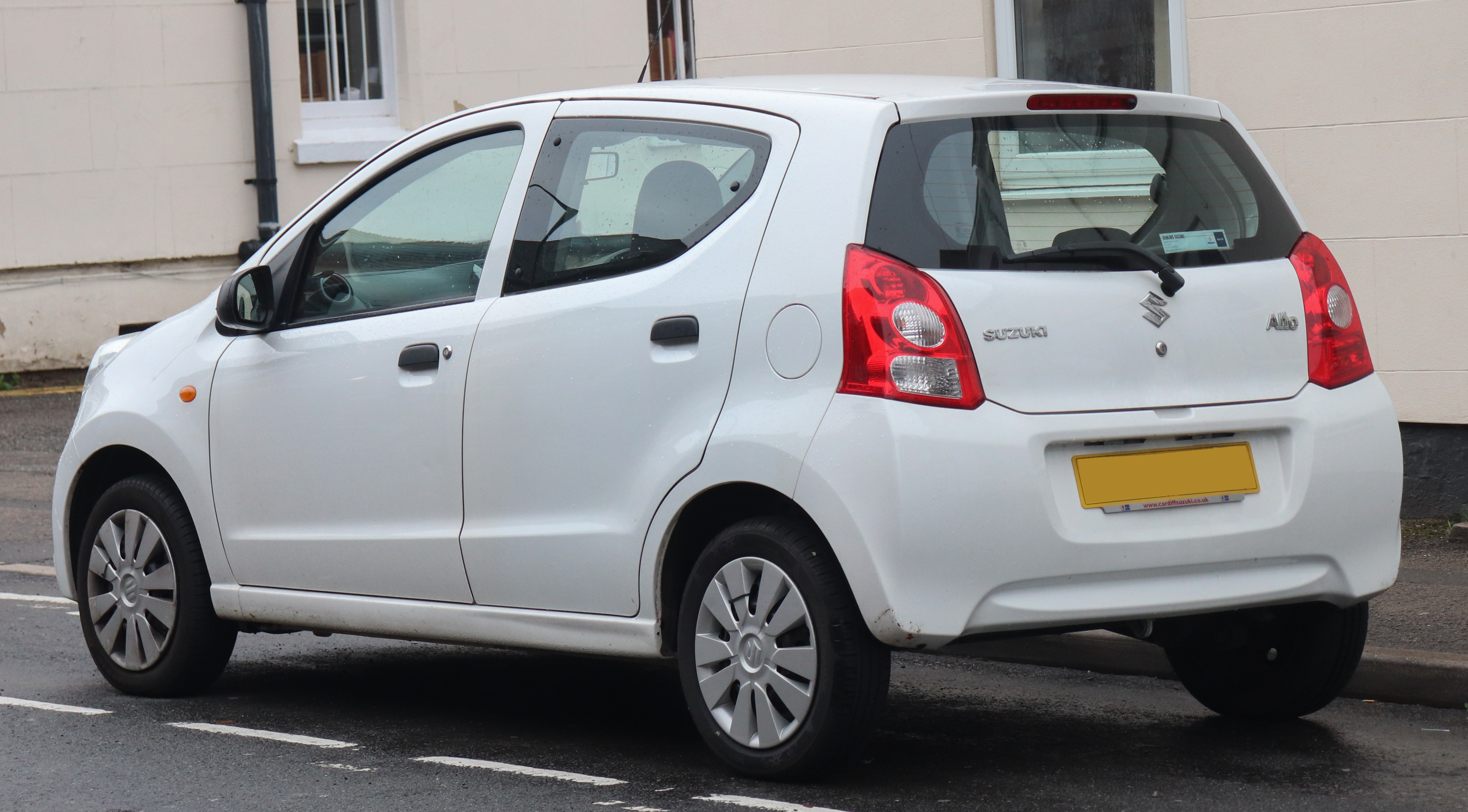
2014 Suzuki Alto (GF) SZ (UK)

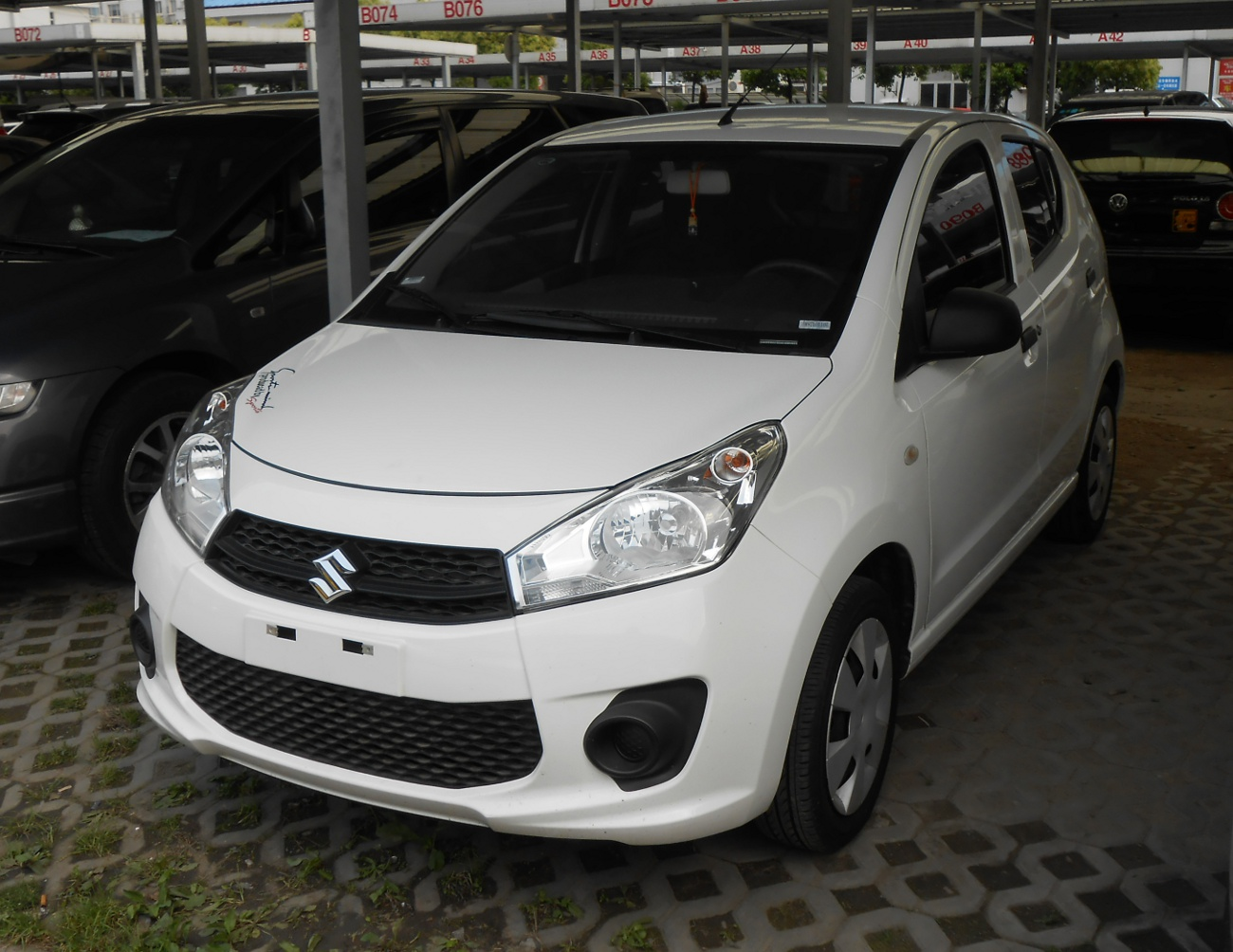
Suzuki Alto facelift (China)

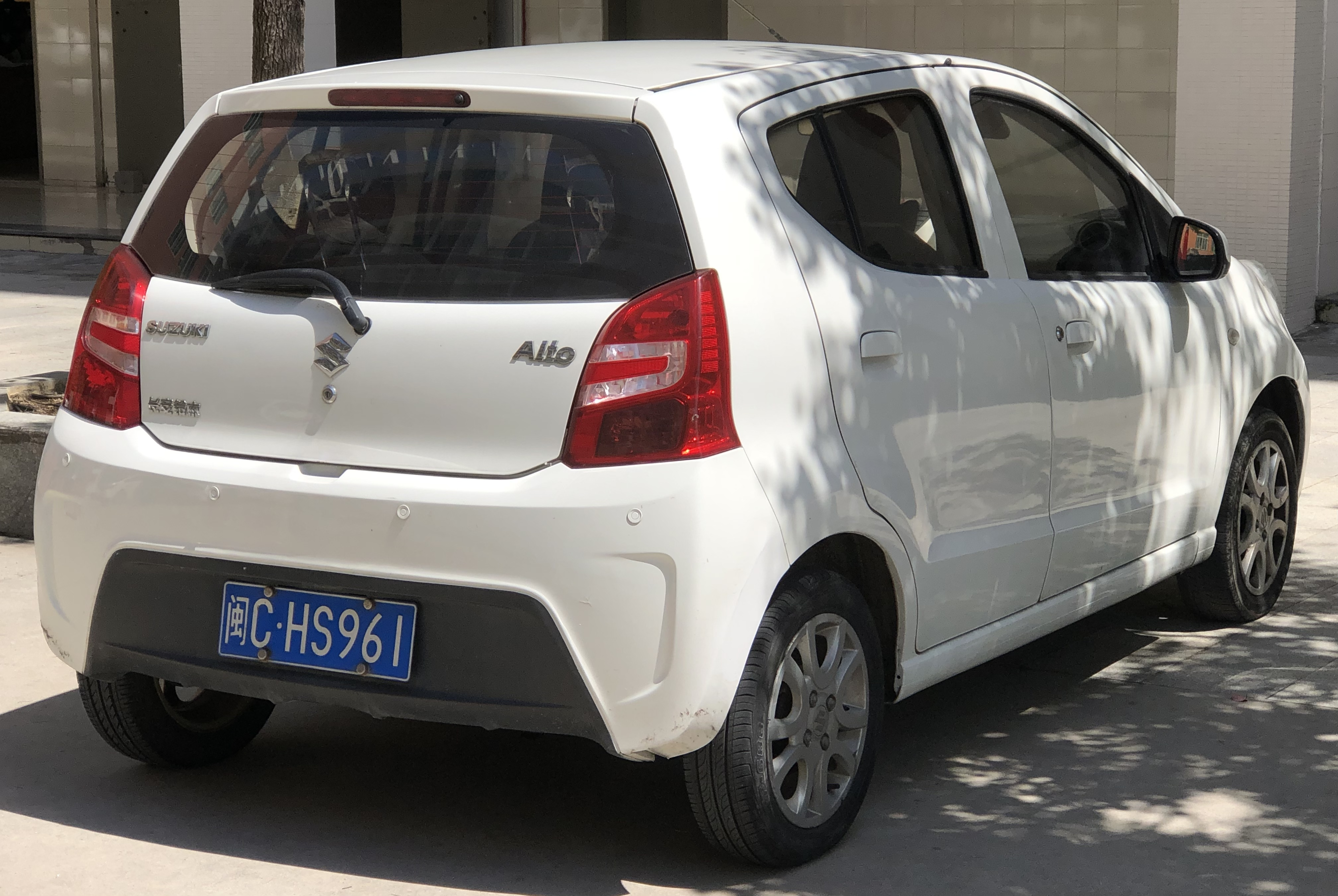
Suzuki Alto facelift (China)

=== Nissan Pixo ===
The Nissan Pixo is the "sister car" to the Suzuki Alto. Mechanically, both cars are very similar; however, there are a few notable exterior differences, including the main grille and headlamps. It was launched at the 2008 Paris Motor Show and was available in Europe from 2009 to 2013. Because it was developed and built cheaply in India, the Pixo was sold for just under £7,000.

The Nissan Pixo was reviewed, and subsequently mocked, by Top Gear in series 17. The review became a Top Gear challenge where Jeremy Clarkson and Richard Hammond bought cars on the second-hand market for the same price as a new Pixo. Clarkson bought a 2002 Mercedes CL600 for £6995, and Hammond bought a 1994 BMW 850ci for £6,700. James May defended the Pixo, arguing that it was more modern, reliable, and economical than the two luxury cars.

In the final quarter of 2013, the Pixo was withdrawn from UK showrooms after just four years of sale due to Nissan’s conclusion of its manufacturing and platform partnership with Maruti Suzuki, and the car was never a massive success after it enjoyed a brief period of decent sales.

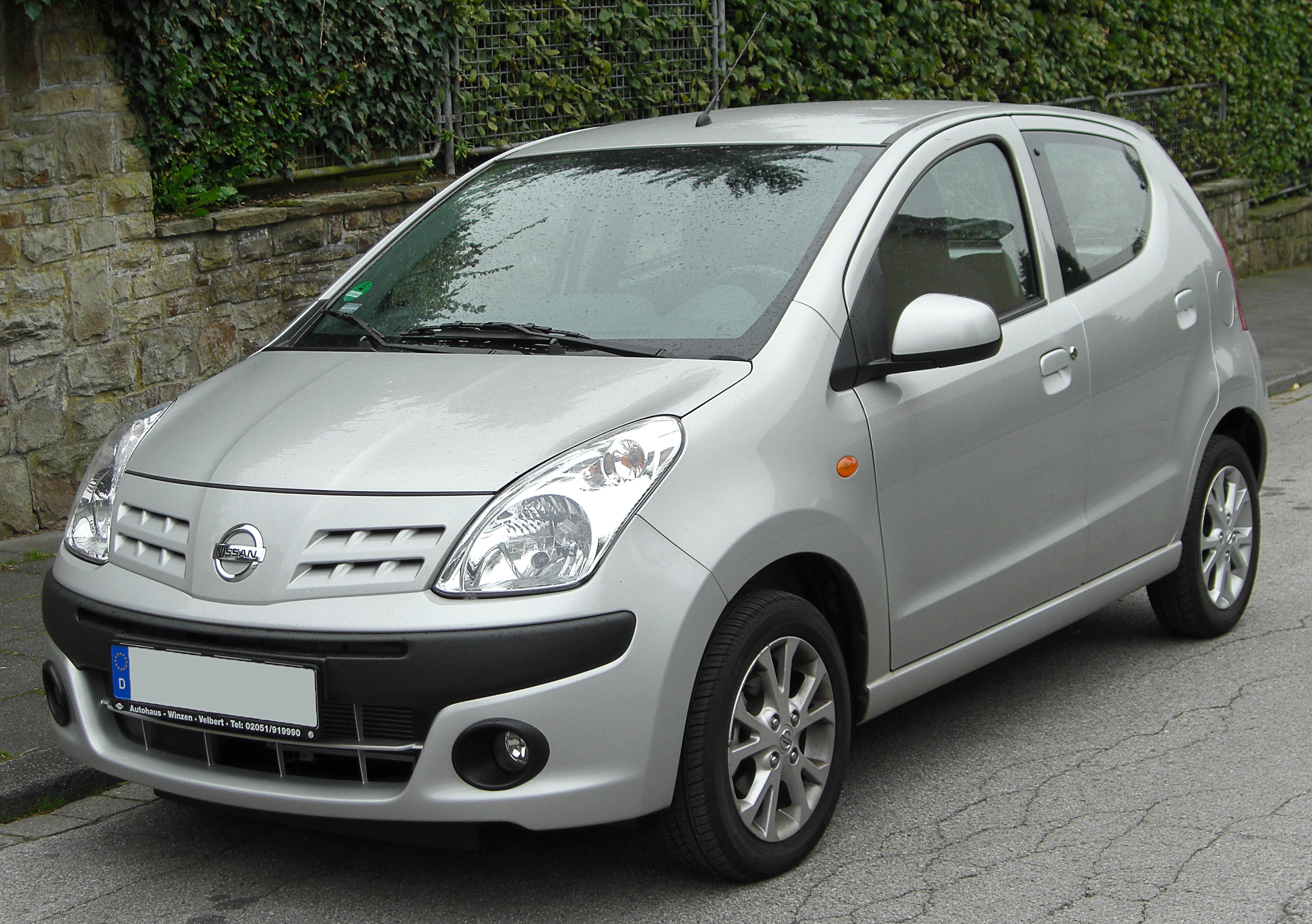
Nissan Pixo (Europe)

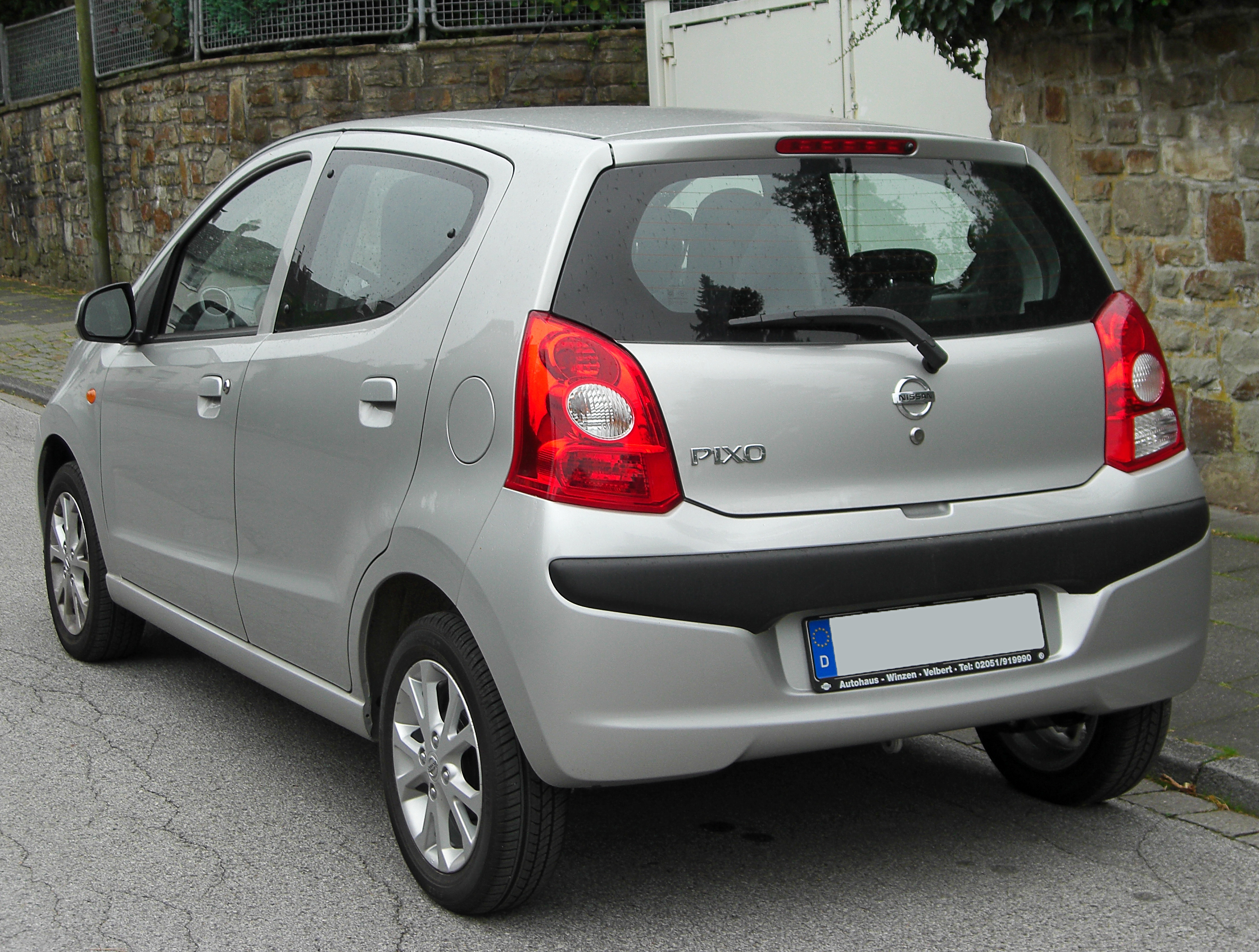
Rear view

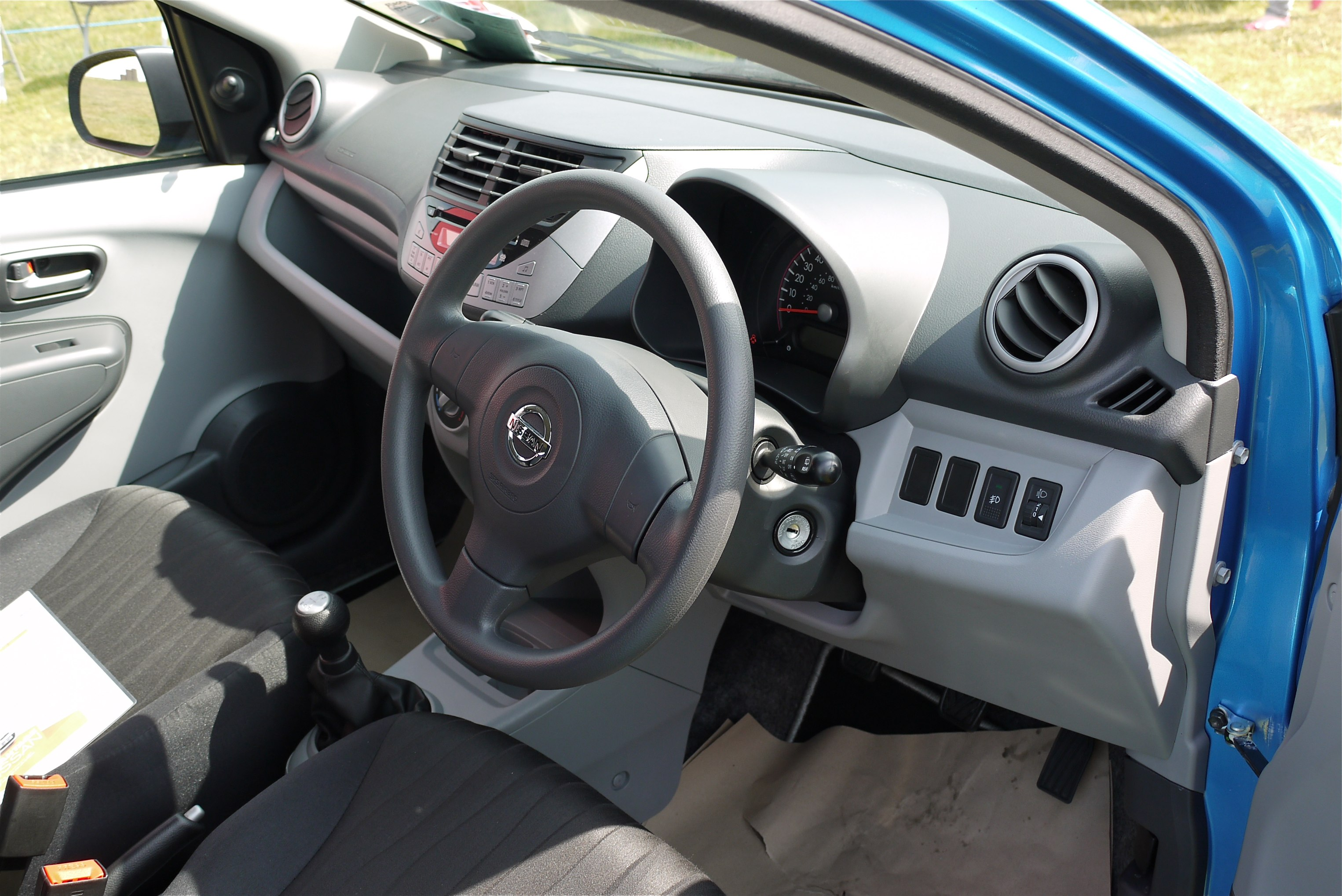
Interior

==== Revival ====
Twelve years later, after a very long hiatus, the Pixo nameplate was revived as a rebadged Renault Twingo E-Tech, which was unveiled on 23 September 2026.

=== Suzuki Alto 800 ===
In 2012, India's Maruti introduced a low-cost replacement for the original Maruti 800 called the Alto 800. This was also exported to many markets outside of Europe and sold as the Suzuki Alto 800, while some markets simultaneously offered the pricier A-Star as the Suzuki Alto.

=== Safety ===
ANCAP test results* Suzuki Alto 5-door hatch (2009)
Test	Score
Overall	4 /5 stars
Frontal offset	10.36/16
Side impact	14.19/16
Pole	Not Assessed
Seat belt reminders	1/3
Whiplash protection	Not Assessed
Pedestrian protection	Marginal
Electronic stability control	Optional

Latin NCAP 1.5 test results Suzuki Celerio + 2 Airbags (2013, similar to Euro NCAP 2002)
Test	Points	Stars
Adult occupant:	12.99/17.0	4 /5 stars
Child occupant:	17.92/49.00	2 /5 stars

== Eighth generation (2014) ==
Eighth generation
- Suzuki Alto X (HA36S)

Overview
- Model code: HA36S/V
- Also called: Mazda Carol
- Production: 2014–2021 (Japan); 2019–present (Pakistan)
- Assembly: Japan: Kosai, Shizuoka; Pakistan: Karachi (Pak Suzuki Motors)

Body and chassis
- Body style: 5-door hatchback
- Layout: Front-engine, front-wheel-drive or four-wheel-drive (Japan)
- Platform: HEARTECT platform
- Related: Suzuki Lapin

Powertrain
- Engine: 658 cc R06A I3; 658 cc R06A I3 turbo (Japan)
- Transmission: 5-speed manual; 5-speed automated manual AGS; CVT (Japan)

Dimensions
- Wheelbase: 2,460 mm (96.9 in)
- Length: 3,395 mm (133.7 in)
- Width: 1,475 mm (58.1 in)
- Height: 1,475 mm (58.1 in); 1,490 mm (58.7 in) (Pakistan); 1,500 mm (59.1 in) (X, Turbo RS and Works trims)
- Curb weight: 610–690 kg (1,345–1,521 lb) (FWD); 660–740 kg (1,455–1,631 lb) (AWD)

The eighth-generation Alto was introduced in Japan in December 2014. The new Alto was the first Suzuki's car designed on lightweight HEARTECT platform. It is also the first Alto that using torsion beam model rear suspension, replacing the old 3-link model (except for all-wheel-drive models). The new lightweight platform, lighter body, engine, seats and simpler rear suspension made the car 60 kg (132 lb) lighter than the outgoing model. This car was also designed to have a very low fuel consumption, achieved using "Suzuki Green Technology" for the body and the engine, and resulted in the car having a claimed fuel consumption of 37 km/L (100 mpg_{‑imp}; 87 mpg_{‑US}).

The conventional models of the new Alto is available in five trim levels. The passenger variant are called "F", "L", "S" and "X", plus a commercial van variant called "VP". All powered with a naturally-aspirated K06A 658 cc (40.2 cu in) inline-three engine, from previous generation. This engine received major improvement in fuel efficiency by raising the compression ratio and adopting the exhaust gas recirculation (EGR) system (excludes "F" trim with manual transmission and "VP" van), while enhancing the low-to-mid speed driving performance by newly designing the intake and exhaust systems. The weight also reduced by adopting a cylinder head integrated with an exhaust manifold and simplifying the catalyzer case. It is mated with either a 5-speed manual transmission ("F" and "VP"), a 5-speed automated manual transmission called Auto Gear Shift (AGS) by Suzuki ("F" and "VP"), or a CVT ("L", "S" and "X"). All transmissions are available with all wheel-drive option. The K06A engine with manual transmission for "F" and "VP" trims are rated at 49 PS (36 kW) and 58 N⋅m (43 lb⋅ft), while the rest of the range produces 52 PS (38 kW) and 62 N⋅m (46 lb⋅ft) because those engines are fitted with VVT.

A sporty variant intended for daily use called "Turbo RS" was introduced in March 2015 which was followed by a more spartan performance-tuned "Works" variant which made a comeback in December after 15 years of absence. The Works had been discontinued as the market had shifted away from performance cars to instead concerning itself with economy and the environment; Suzuki made mention of the high fuel economy even of the Works model. These high performance models are powered with the turbocharged variant of K06A engine, producing 64 PS (47 kW) and 98 N⋅m (72 lb⋅ft) - ("Works" has two Nm more than the Turbo RS). It is paired with either a 5-speed manual (not available for "Turbo RS") or automated manual transmission with taller gear ratios than the less powerful "F" and VP" trims. The handling is also reworked with new wider high performance tires from Bridgestone, shock absorber from KYB, ventilated front disc brakes, strut bar to increase body's rigidity, rear stabilizer bar for front wheel-drive models (also available for "X" trim).

For the interior, unlike the previous generation, adjustable front seats head rest and 50:50 foldable back seats (still with adjustable head rest, excluding "VP", "F" and "L" trims) are deleted. All natural aspirated engined models received two tone black and white colours. In 2018, the seat upholstery was replaced with dark blue colour for "L", "S" and "X" trims. "Turbo RS" and "Works" trims has black with red accents interior colour, leather wrapped steering wheel, paddle shift for AGS models and tachometer. The "Works" trim added racing front seats from Recaro, stainless steel pedals and turbo boost meter.

In term of exterior, all naturally aspirated models are using halogen headlights as standard and 13 inches steel wheels with hubcaps (except "VP") and "X" with special two tone colours. The "Turbo RS" and "Works" received more sporty bumpers, side skirts, rear upper spoiler, fog lights, stickers, 15 inches aluminium wheels from Enkei (also available for "X" trim), front brake calipers with red colour for "Works" and HID headlights.

The safety is also upgraded with additional electronic stability control and collision avoidance system. The car achieved 4 of 5 stars in crash tests performed by JNCAP.

To celebrate the 40-year anniversary of Alto, a special edition called "L Limited" was launched in June 2019. The car is based on "L" trim with additional accessories and features from higher trims.

The "Turbo RS" trim was discontinued in December 2018, followed by the "X" trim in October 2020, the "VP" commercial van in August 2021, with the entire lineup finally replaced by the ninth generation four months later. The August 2021 discontinuation of the VP also marked the end of the Alto commercial vehicle, as there was no such version planned for the ninth generation.

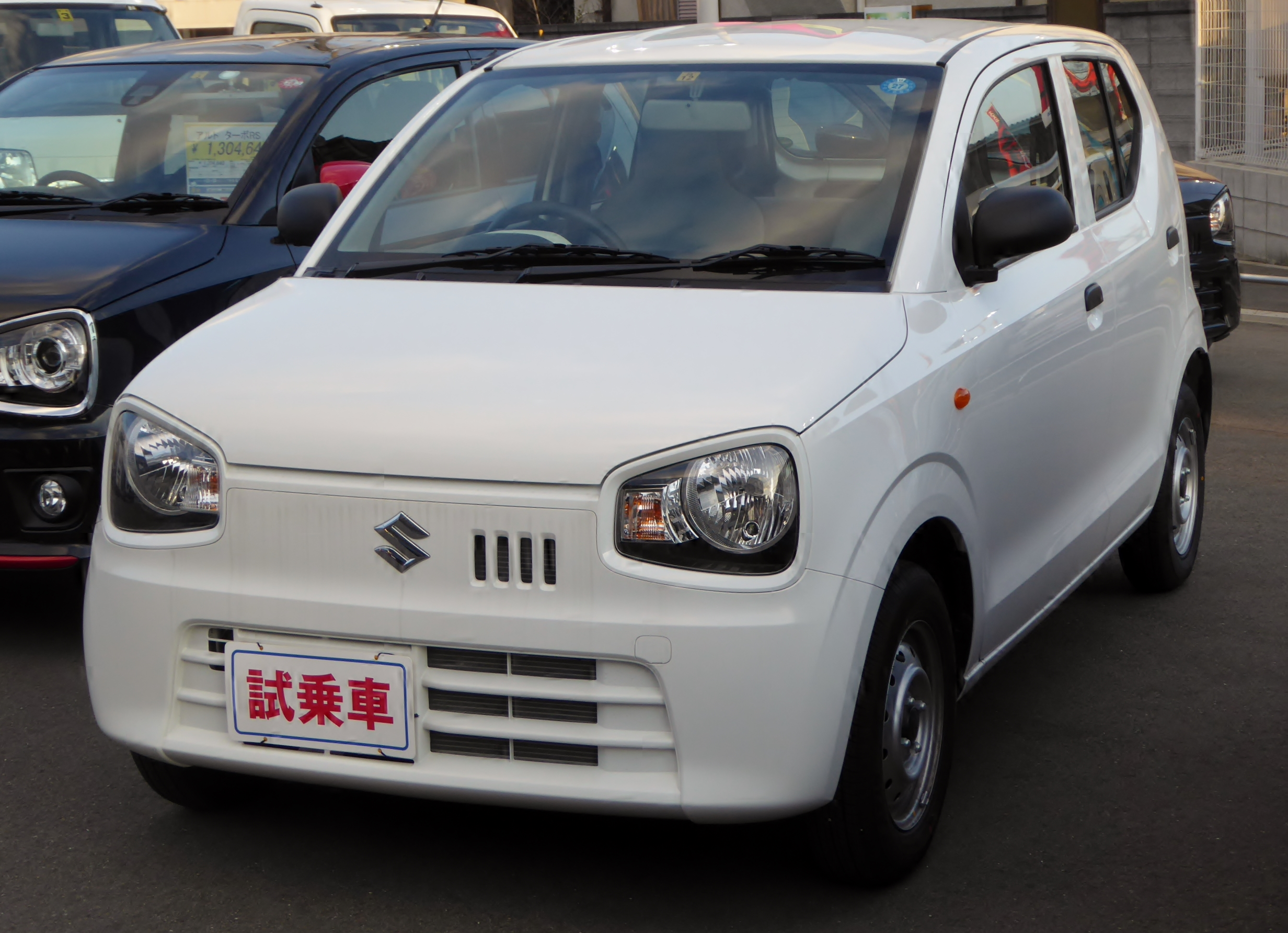
Suzuki Alto Van VP (HA36V)

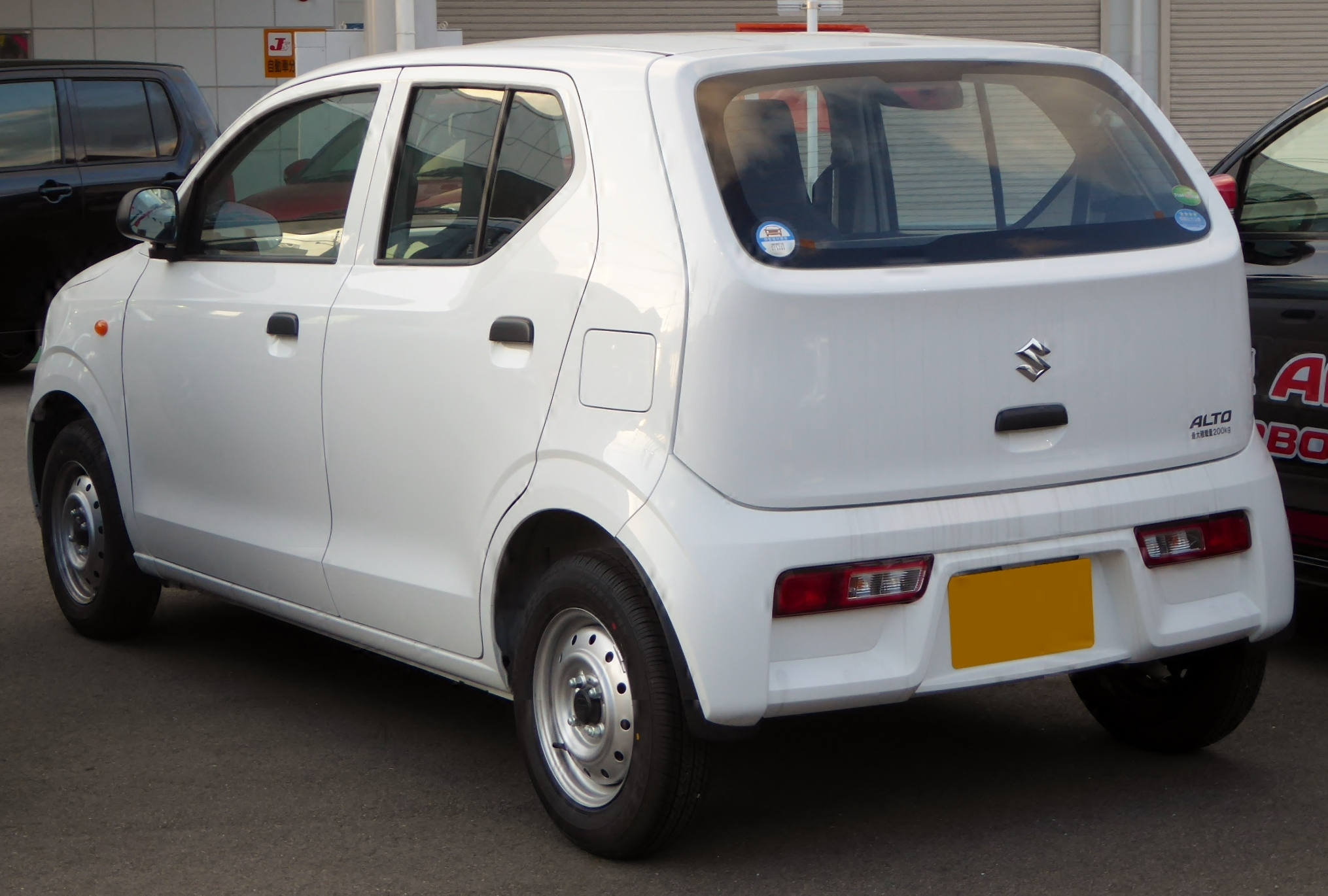
Suzuki Alto Van VP (HA36V)

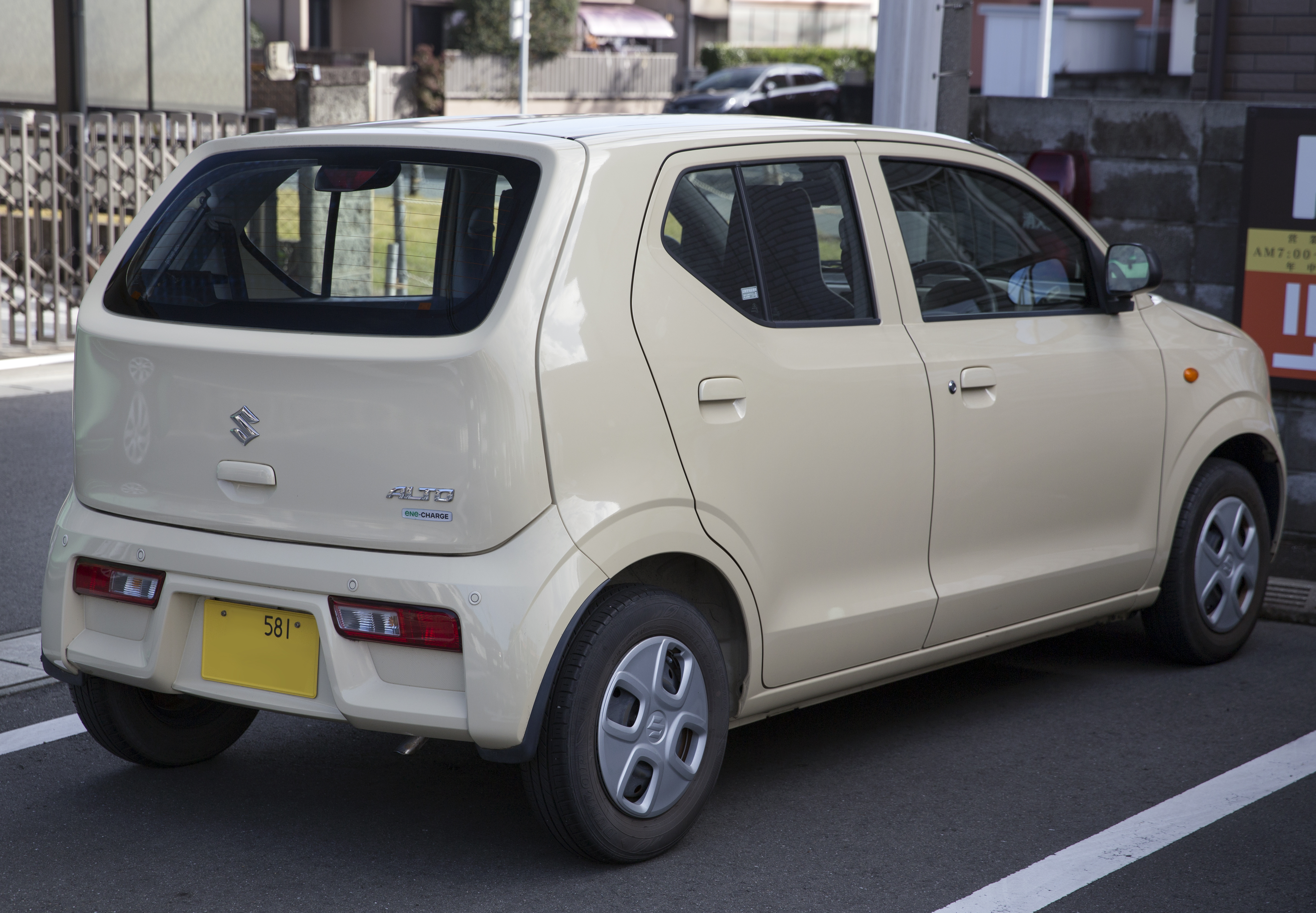
Suzuki Alto L (HA36S; rear)

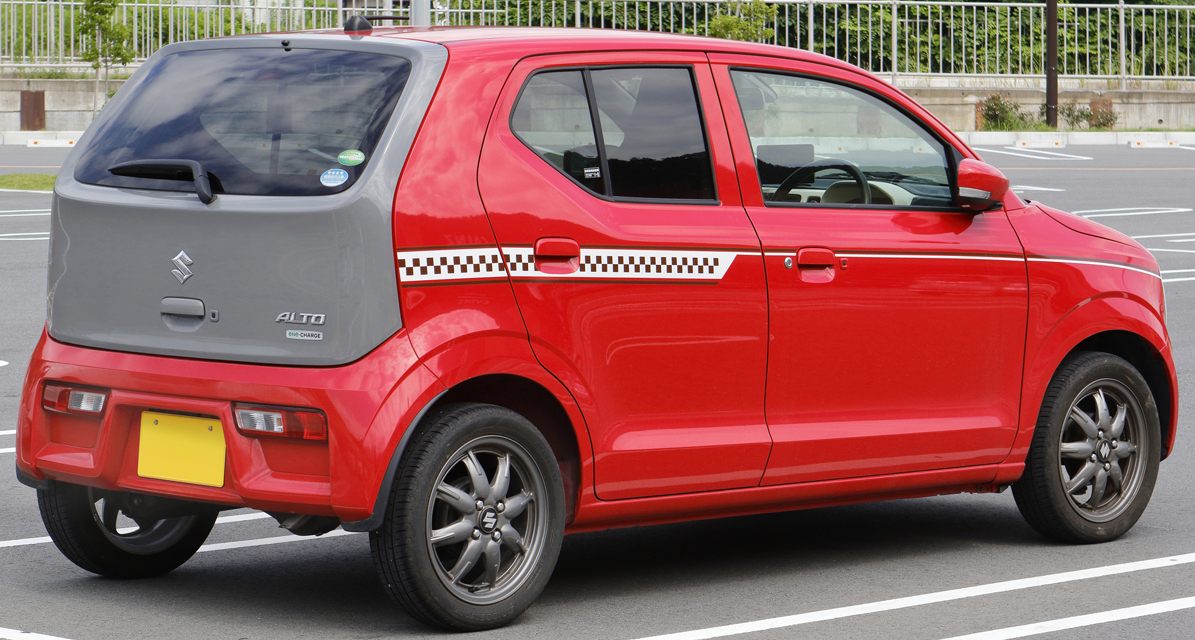
Suzuki Alto X two tone (HA36S)

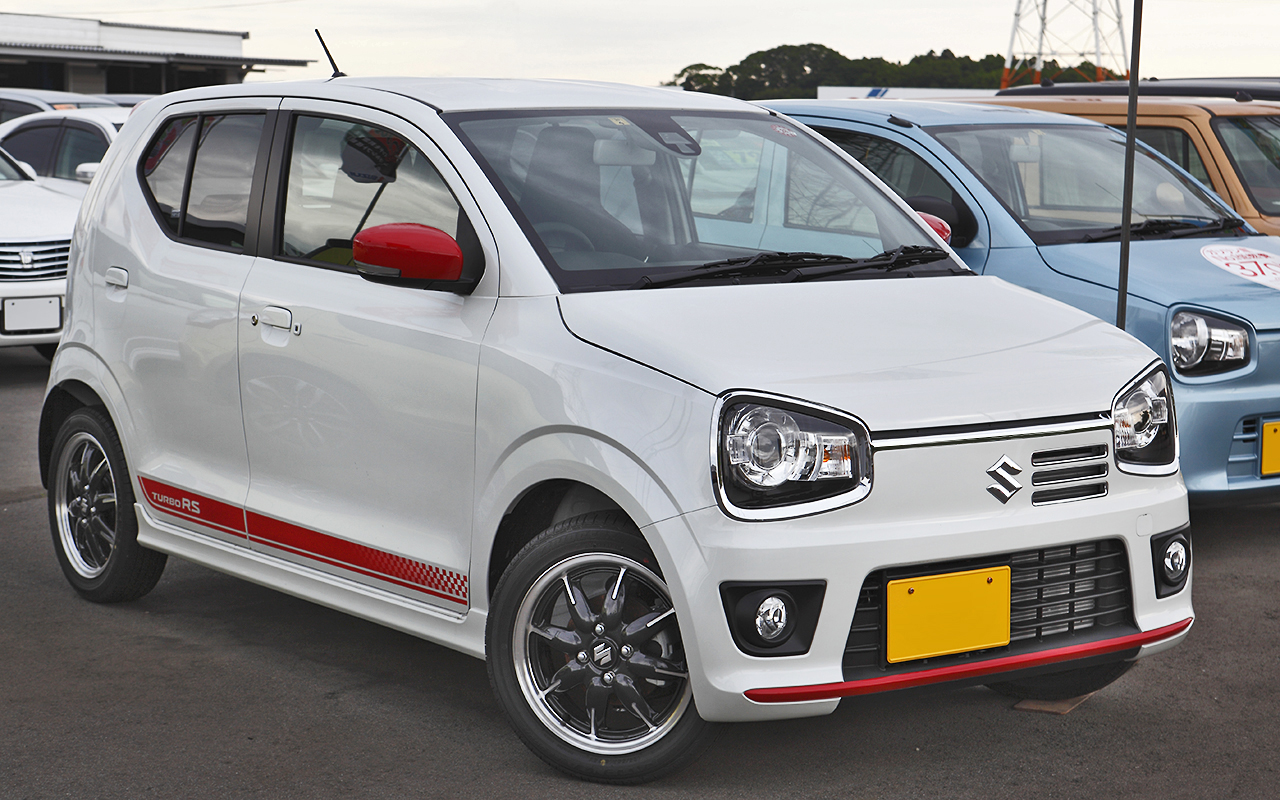
Suzuki Alto RS (HA36S)

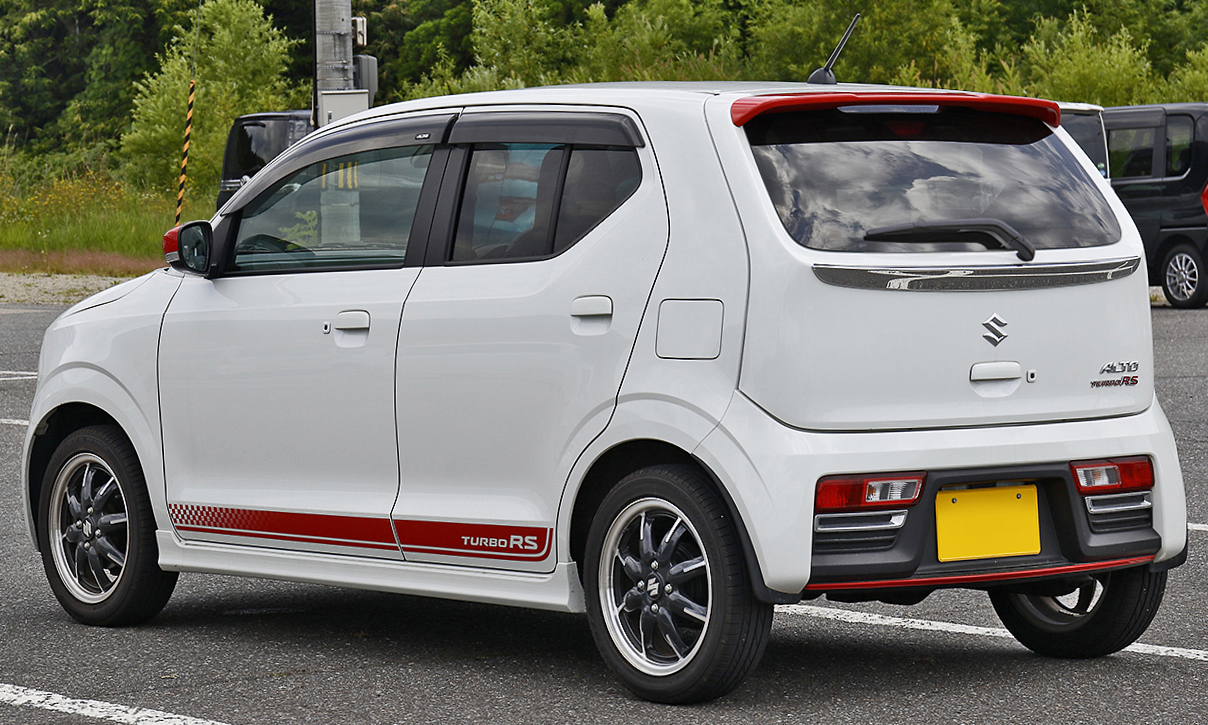
Suzuki Alto RS (HA36S)

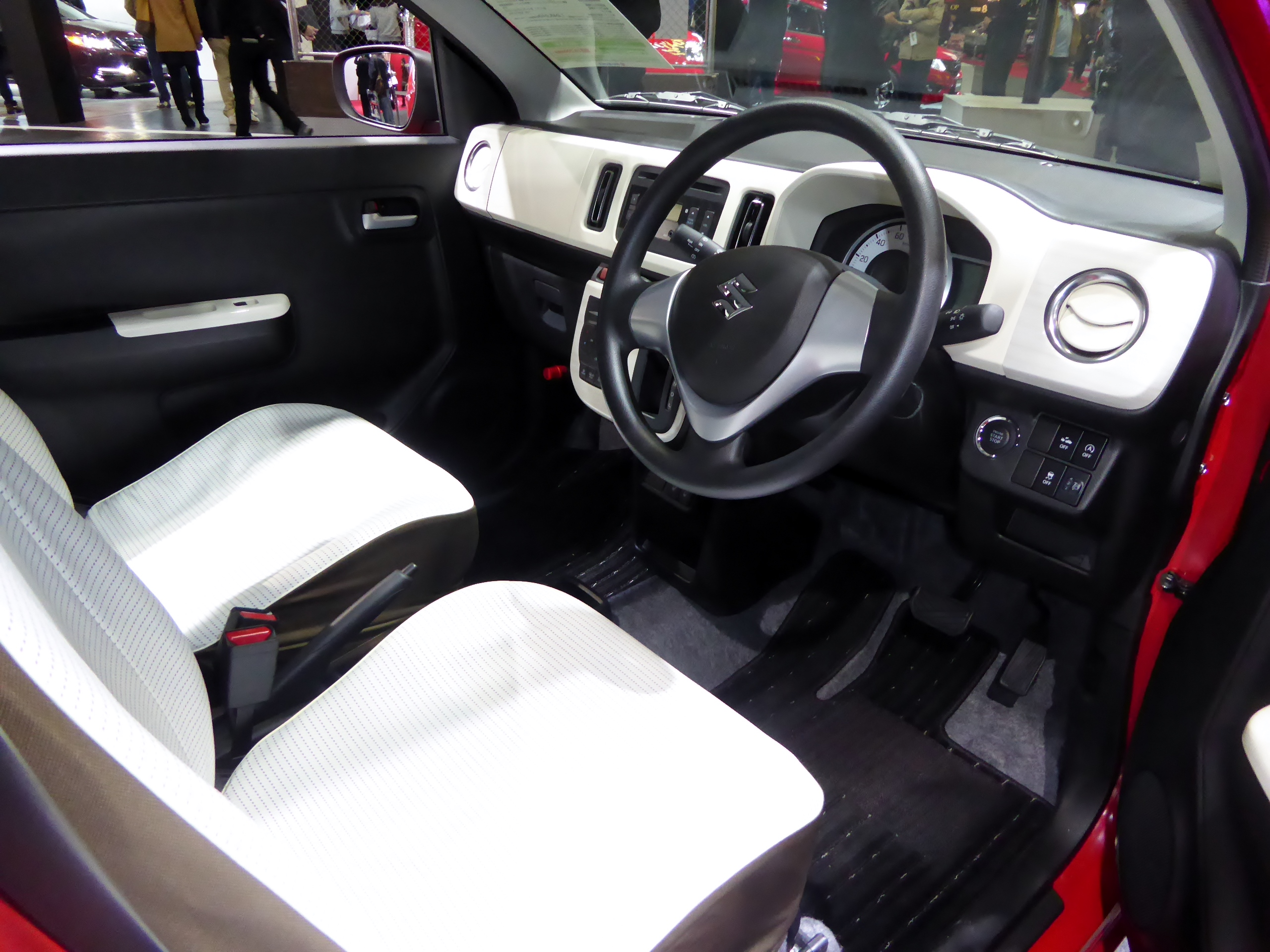
Interior (Alto X)

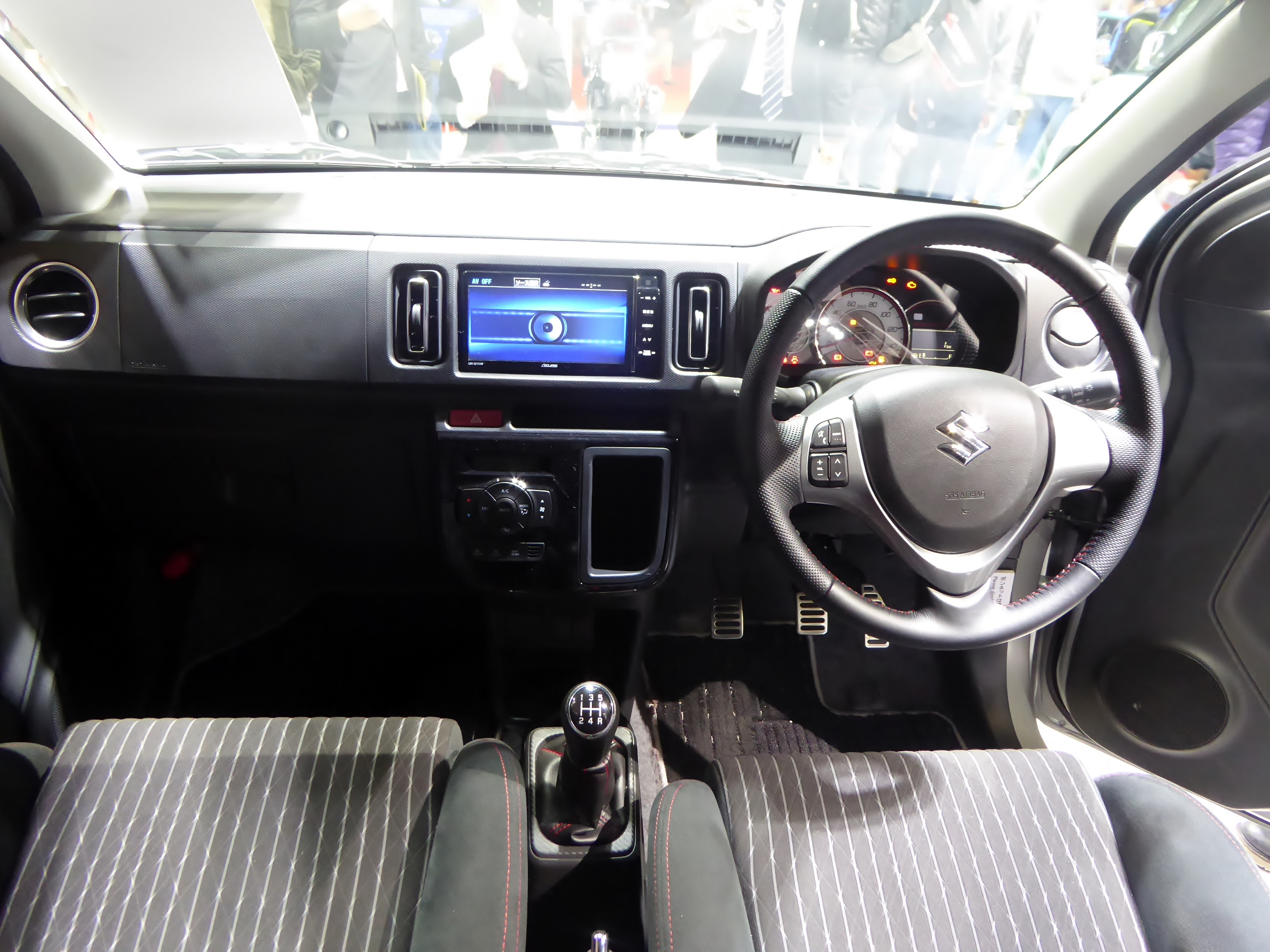
Interior (Alto Works)

=== Pakistan ===
The eighth-generation Alto was revealed for the Pakistani market on 12 April 2019 at the Pakistan Auto Show (PAPS). The car is sold in three variants: "VX", "VXR" and "VXL". The "VX" being the base model with minimal equipment (with air conditioning added in the 2025 facelift) and a 5-speed manual transmission; the "VXR" variant gaining twin airbags, power locks, power steering, etc.; while the premium "VXL" model is further equipped with air conditioning, ABS brakes, and an automated manual transmission "AGS". The launch price ranges from Rs999,000 to Rs1,295,000.

The local manufacturing of Alto has made Pakistan one of the few countries in the world that locally manufactures kei cars. Currently, Pakistan is the only country other than Japan to locally manufacture this generation of Suzuki Alto. Pak Suzuki Motors' second generation Alto looks cosmetically the same as the Japanese-made one and is powered by the same engine. It is rated at 39.5 PS (29 kW) and 56 N⋅m (41 lb⋅ft), lower than Japanese model because the lower compression ratio (10 vs 11.5), lack of VVT and several other differences.

=== Export markets ===
==== Brunei ====
The eighth-generation Alto was launched in Brunei on 27 August 2026, as a fully imported vehicle for the Bruneian market is sourced from the Pakistan, the model was offered in the sole variant: VXL with the 5-speed AGS transmission.

== Ninth generation (2021) ==
Ninth generation
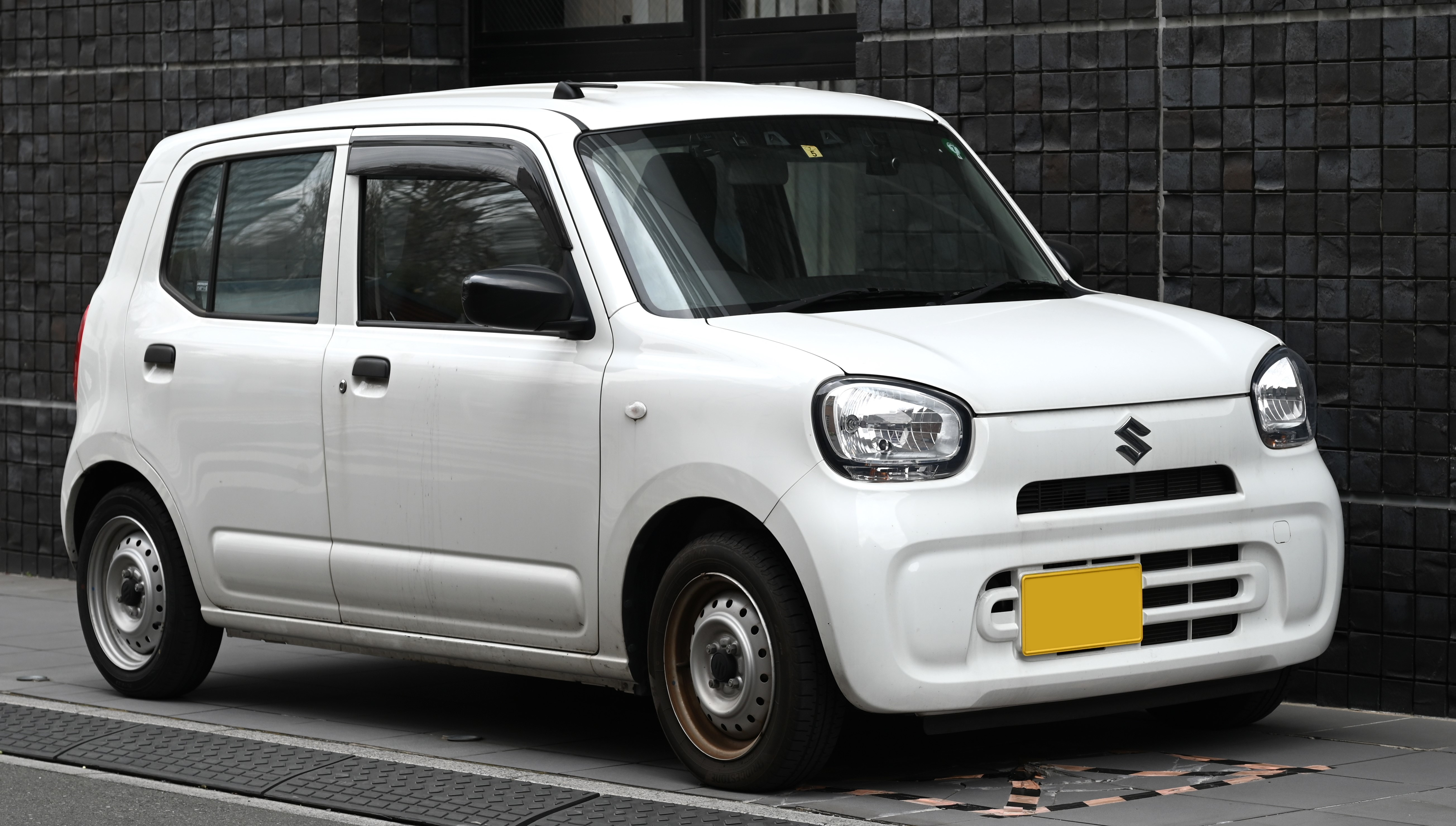
- Alto A (HA37S)

Overview
- Model code: HA37/HA97
- Also called: Mazda Carol
- Production: 2021–present
- Assembly: Japan: Kosai, Shizuoka
- Designer: Alessandro Di Gregorio and Ayano Oshita

Body and chassis
- Body style: 5-door hatchback
- Layout: Front-engine, front-wheel-drive or four-wheel-drive
- Platform: HEARTECT platform
- Related: Suzuki Wagon R Smile

Powertrain
- Engine: 657 cc R06D I3 (MHEV); 658 cc R06A I3
- Electric motor: WA04C DC synchronous
- Transmission: CVT
- Hybrid drivetrain: Mild hybrid with Integrated Starter Generator (ISG)
- Battery: 3Ah Lithium Ion

Dimensions
- Wheelbase: 2,460 mm (96.9 in)
- Length: 3,395 mm (133.7 in)
- Width: 1,475 mm (58.1 in)
- Height: 1,525 mm (60.0 in)
- Curb weight: 680–760 kg (1,499–1,676 lb)

The ninth-generation Alto was introduced in Japan in December 2021. It is continued to be built on lightweight HEARTECT platform and powered with the same R06A engine for the conventional models. Additionally, the car received new R06D engine with mild hybrid system that was also seen in Suzuki Wagon R Smile. CVT is the only transmission that is available in this generation and became the first Alto without manual transmission option. The Auto Gear Shift (AGS) automated manual transmission is also abolished.

The exterior styling is penned by Alessandro Di Gregorio, designer of Suzuki European Design Center in Italy: aesthetically the whole body presents softer, friendlier and less angular lines while still recalling the design of the previous generation. The windscreen is more vertical to make the passenger compartment more spacious and the total height is increased.

Four trim levels are available, "A" and "L" for conventional model and "S" and "X" for hybrid model.

A minor facelift occurred in June 2025, including a larger front grille, softer bumpers front and rear, and revised safety equipment including an updated Dual Sensor Brake Support II (Suzuki's automatic emergency braking system).

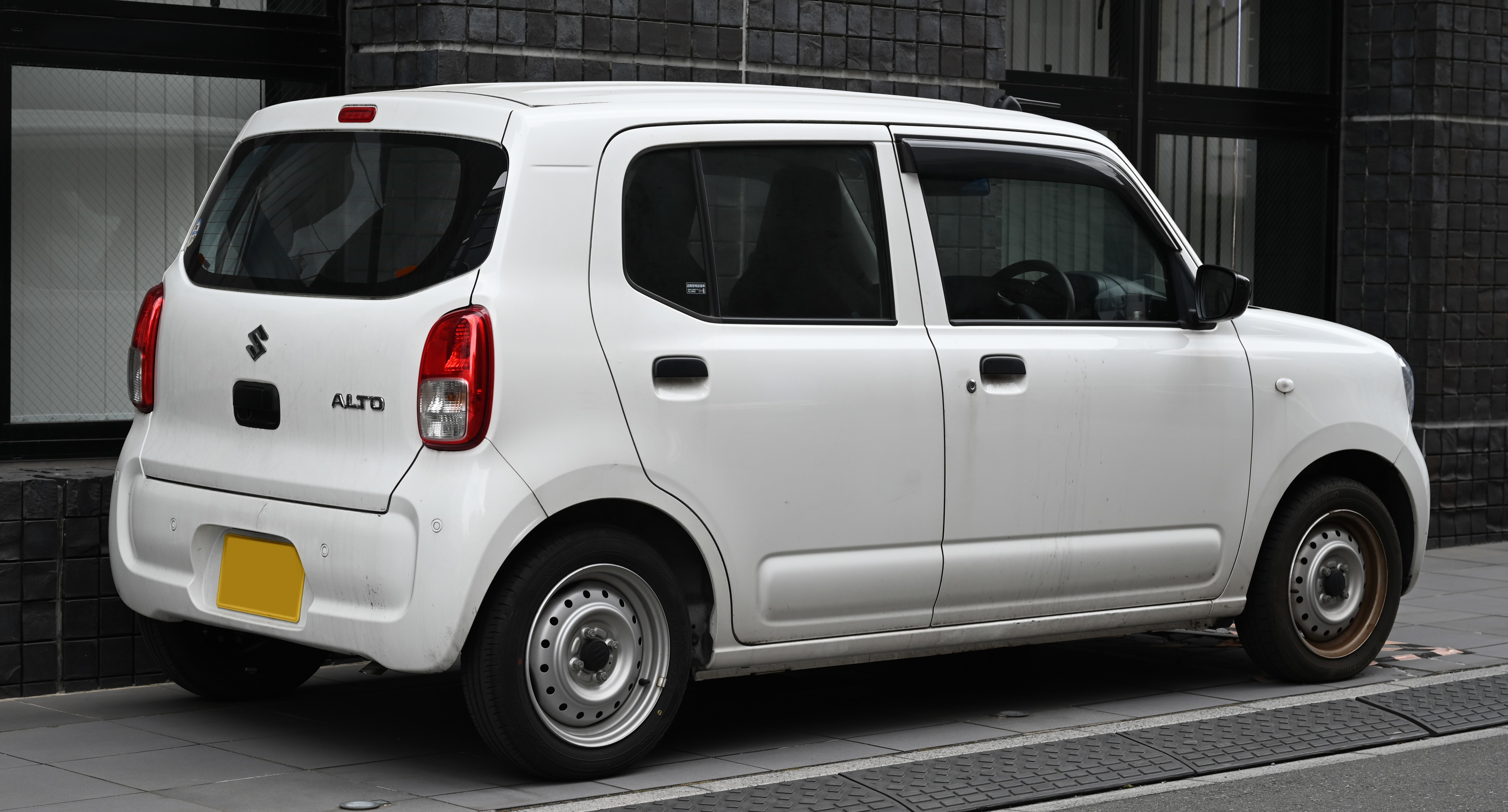
Alto A rear view

Pre-facelift Alto Hybrid X (HA97S; 2023)

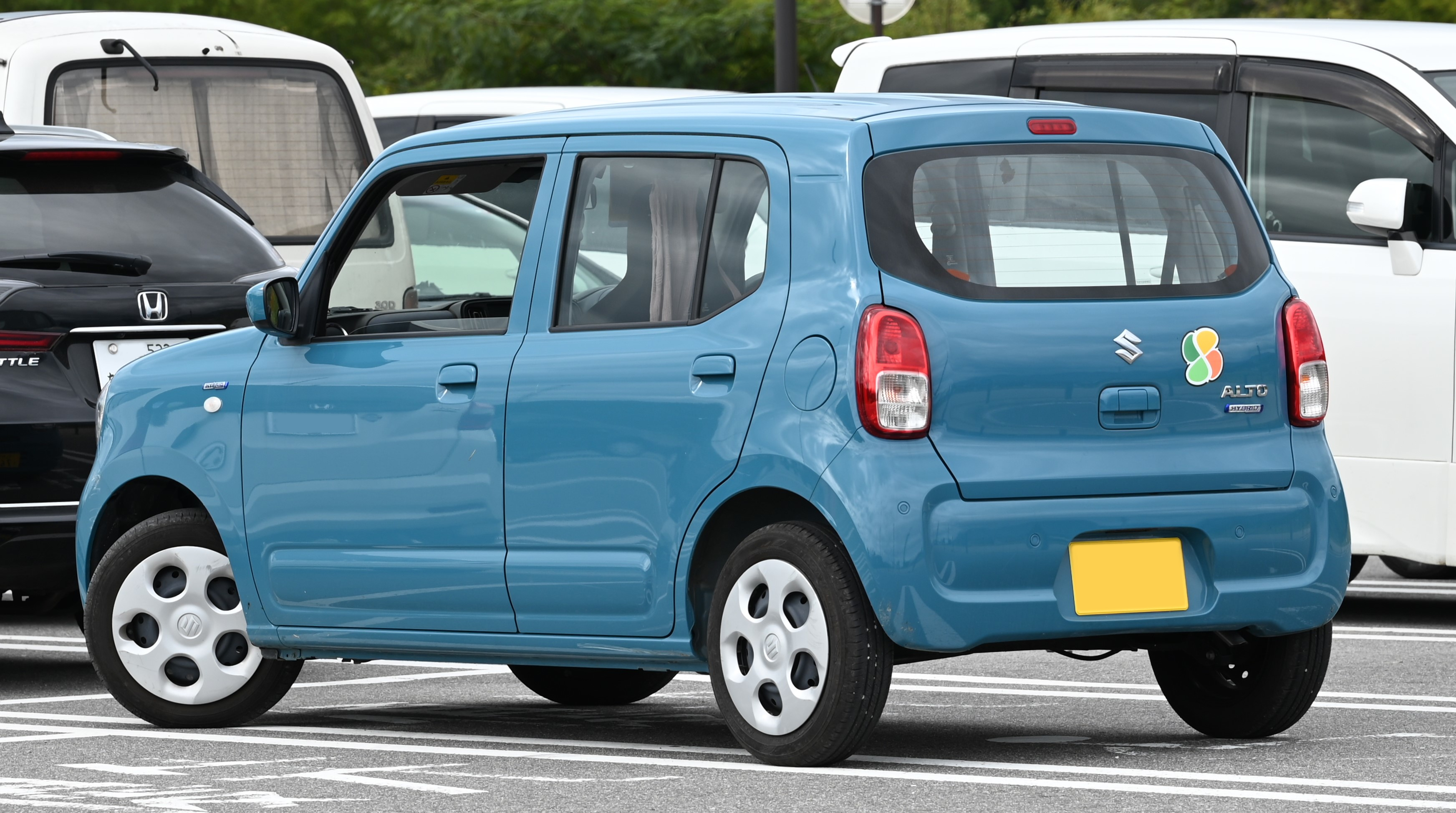
Alto Hybrid S rear view

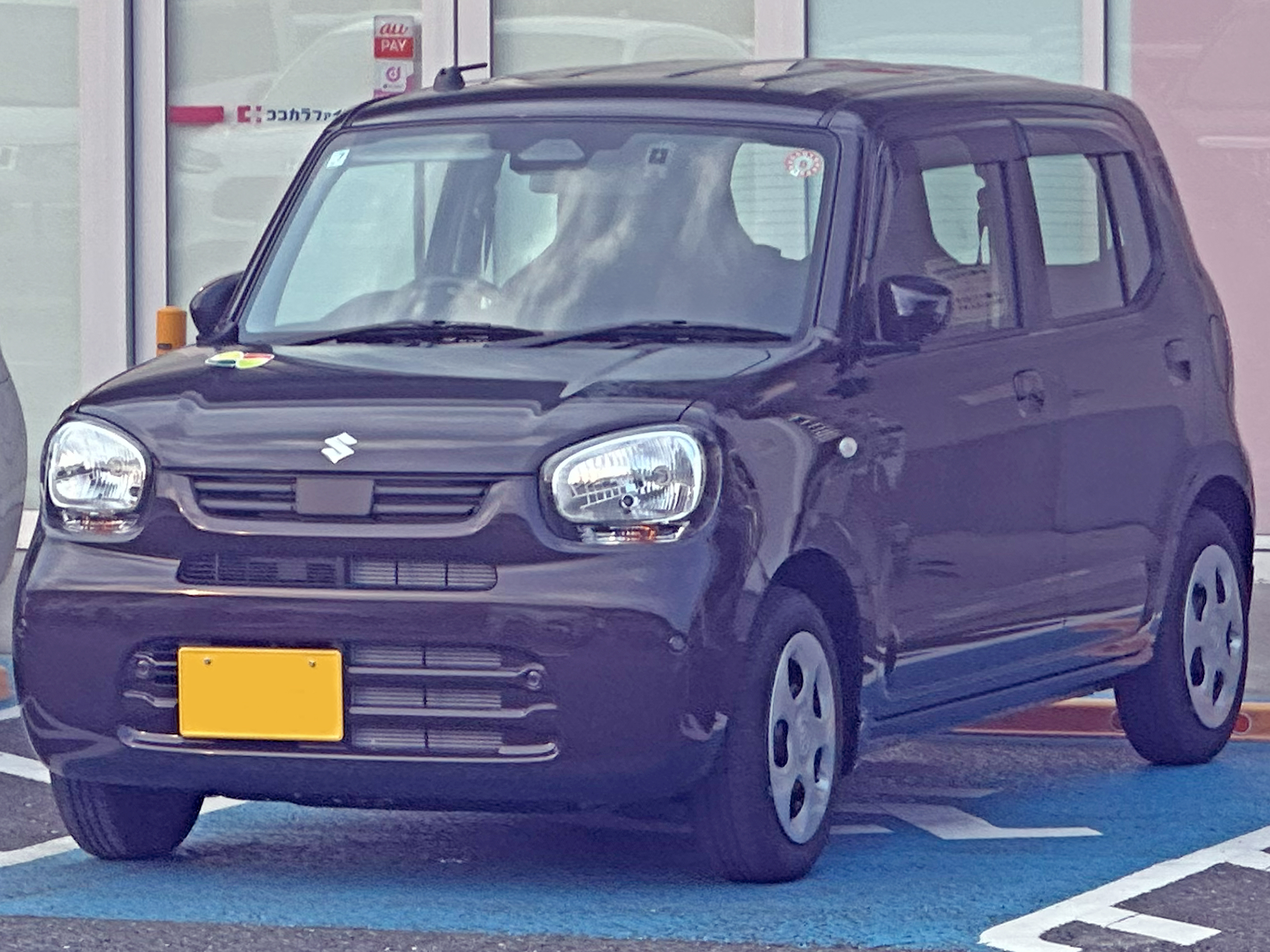
2025 facelift Alto L (HA37S)

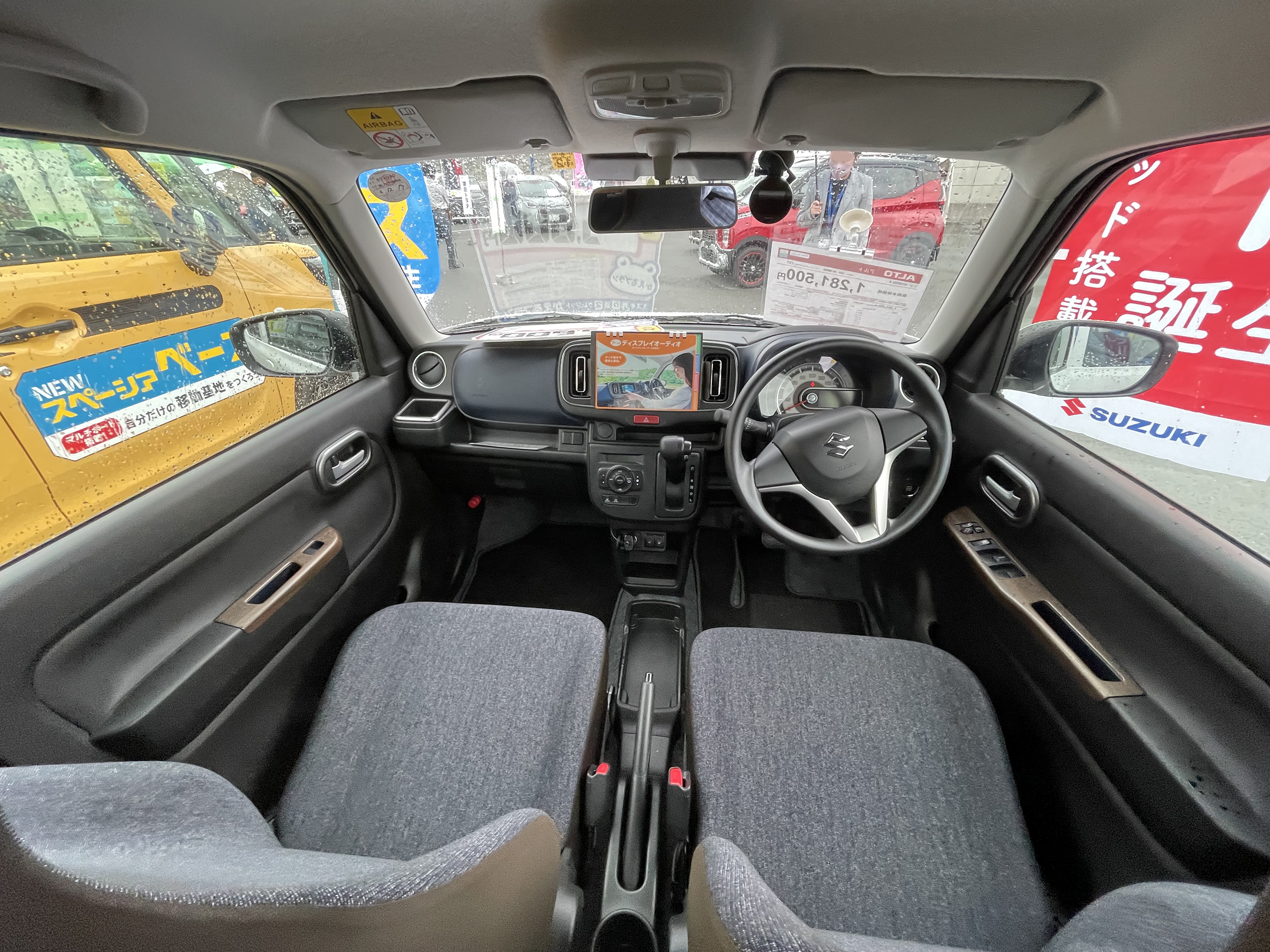
Interior
