= Suzuki Hustler =

Subcompact crossover SUV produced by Suzuki classed as a kei car

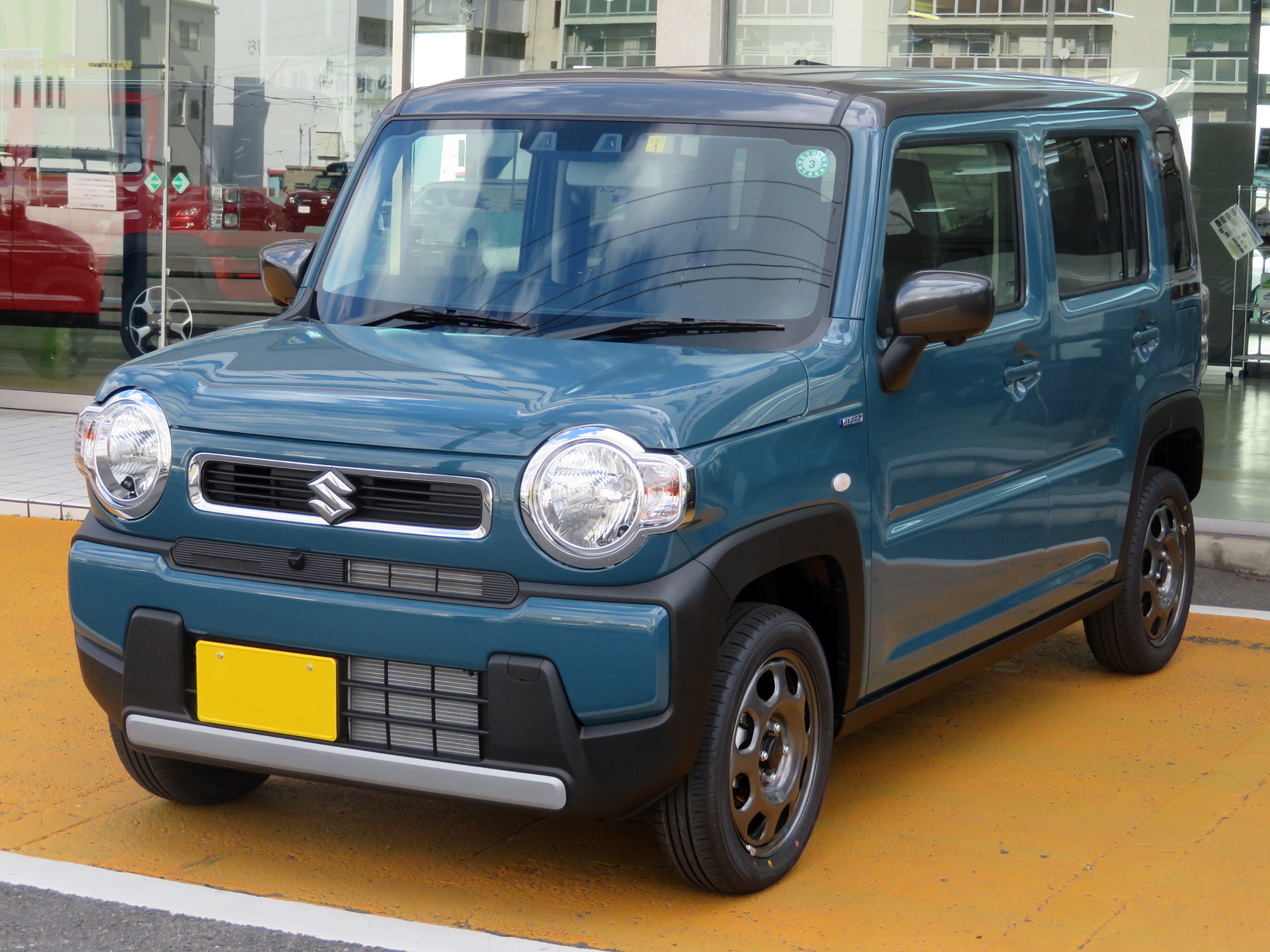
- 2020 Suzuki Hustler Hybrid G (MR92S, Japan)

Overview
- Manufacturer: Suzuki
- Also called: Mazda Flair Crossover
- Production: January 2014 – present
- Assembly: Japan: Kosai, Shizuoka

Body and chassis
- Class: Kei car Mini SUV; Crossover
- Body style: 5-door crossover SUV
- Layout: Front-engine, front-wheel-drive; Front-engine, four-wheel-drive
- Platform: HEARTECT platform

Chronology
- Predecessor: Suzuki Kei (Hustler); Mazda Laputa (Flair Crossover); Mazda AZ-Offroad (Flair Crossover, indirect)

The Suzuki Hustler (Japanese: スズキ・ハスラー, Suzuki Hasurā) is a crossover SUV-styled kei car produced by the Japanese automaker Suzuki since 2014. The car is also sold by Mazda as the Mazda Flair Crossover (Japanese: マツダ・フレアクロスオーバー, Matsuda Furea Kurosuōbā) through an OEM agreement.

== Overview and Name ==
According to Suzuki, the Hustler is a new genre of kei car that combines elements of a kei tall wagon with a SUV, and was developed for users who often drive on uneven roads such as rutted roads and snowy roads, and is intended to be alternative version from the Jimny.

Suzuki previously had Kei, a crossover-style with high ground clearance, but production was ended in 2009. Later, Osamu Suzuki heard people lamenting the ceased production at a dinner and decided that there was a demand for a light crossover. He proceeded to develop the Hustler as its direct successor.

Suzuki's design department chose the name "Hustler" to promote the car's lively and rough riding image. In Japan, the name was used by Suzuki in the past as the nickname of a two-stroke, dual-sport motorcycle, the Hustler TS series. The car's accessories also have a replica sticker of the emblem that was once used in the TS50. Suzuki's distributor in the United States had also sold the Suzuki T20 as the Hustler in the second half of the 1960s.

The Hustlers also offered in outside Japan, such as Hong Kong and Macau.

== First generation (MR31S/41S; 2014) ==
First generation
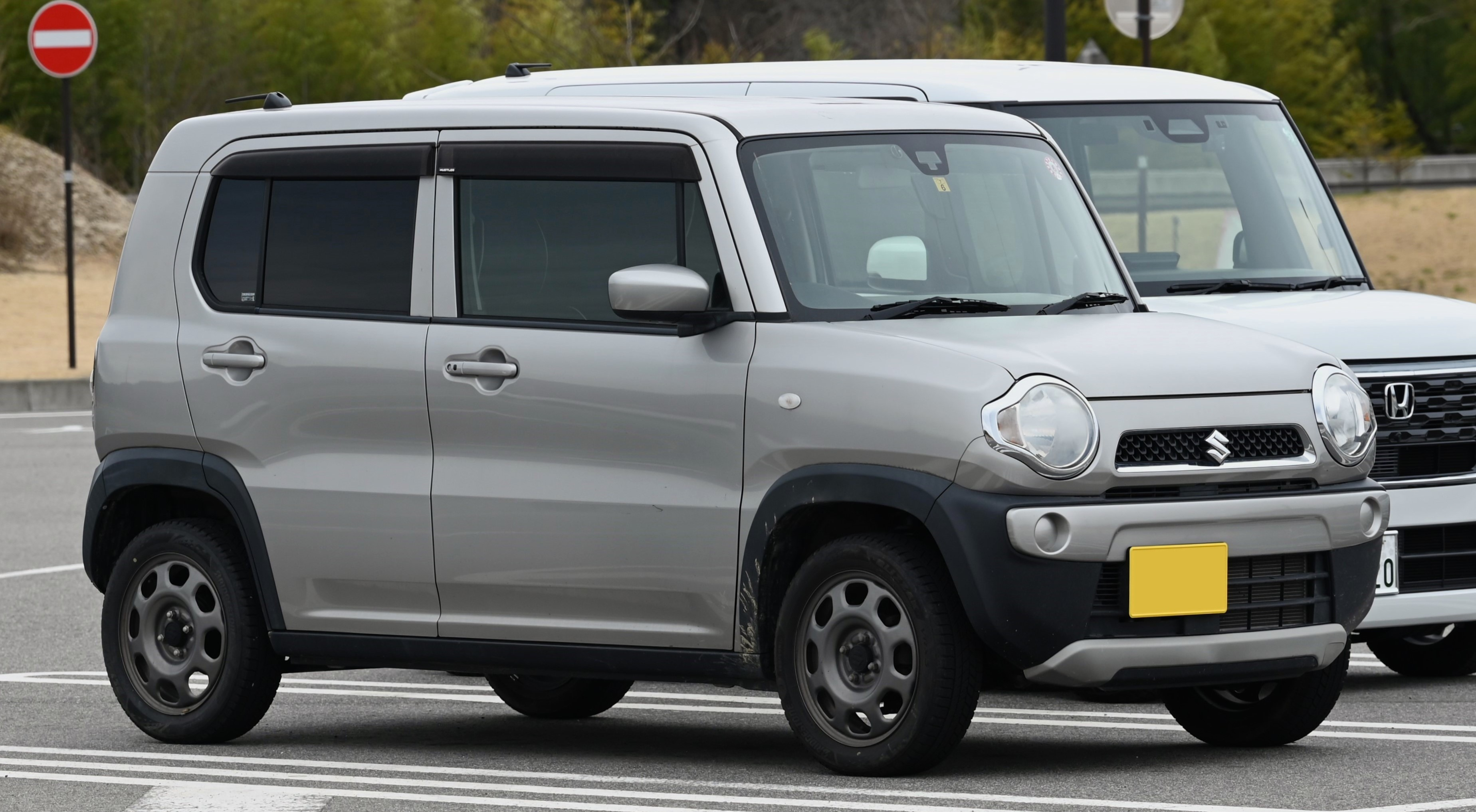
- Suzuki Hustler G (MR31S, Japan)

Overview
- Model code: MR31S/MR41S
- Also called: Mazda Flair Crossover
- Production: January 2014 – December 2019

Powertrain
- Engine: 658 cc R06A I3; 658 cc R06A turbo I3
- Electric motor: 2 PS (1.5 kW; 2.0 hp) WA04A / WA04C DC synchronous
- Power output: 38 kW (52 PS; 51 hp) (naturally aspirated); 47 kW (64 PS; 63 hp) (turbocharged)
- Transmission: 5-speed manual; CVT
- Hybrid drivetrain: MHEV with Integrated Starter Generator (ISG)

Dimensions
- Wheelbase: 2,425 mm (95.5 in)
- Length: 3,395 mm (133.7 in)
- Width: 1,475 mm (58.1 in)
- Height: 1,665 mm (65.6 in)
- Curb weight: 750–860 kg (1,653–1,896 lb)

The first generation Hustler was unveiled as 2-door coupe model at 2013 Tokyo Motor Show. The first generation Hustler shared platform from the fifth generation Wagon R. The production version was unveiled on 24 December 2013. It was offered in 3 grades: A, G, and X, and powered by a R06A engine was available naturally aspirated or in a more powerful, turbocharged version. The first generation Hustler went on sale in January 2014, along with Mazda's Flair Crossover rebadge.

The exterior features chrome garnishes around the headlights and black bumpers with silver-painted bumper garnishes. Furthermore, the fender arch mouldings and side guards are also unified in black to express a sense of strength. The interior features an instrument panel made of coloured panels connected by pipes, and coloured panels are also used on the door trims.

The first generation received the 2014–2015 Good Design Award. In the same year, the car received the 2014 Car of The Year by Japan Automotive Hall of Fame.

A two-tone option called the J Style, was added in December 2014. Features a white two-tone roof and an interior colour that matches the body colour. An update version called the J Style II was unveiled at October 2015.

Suzuki Hustler

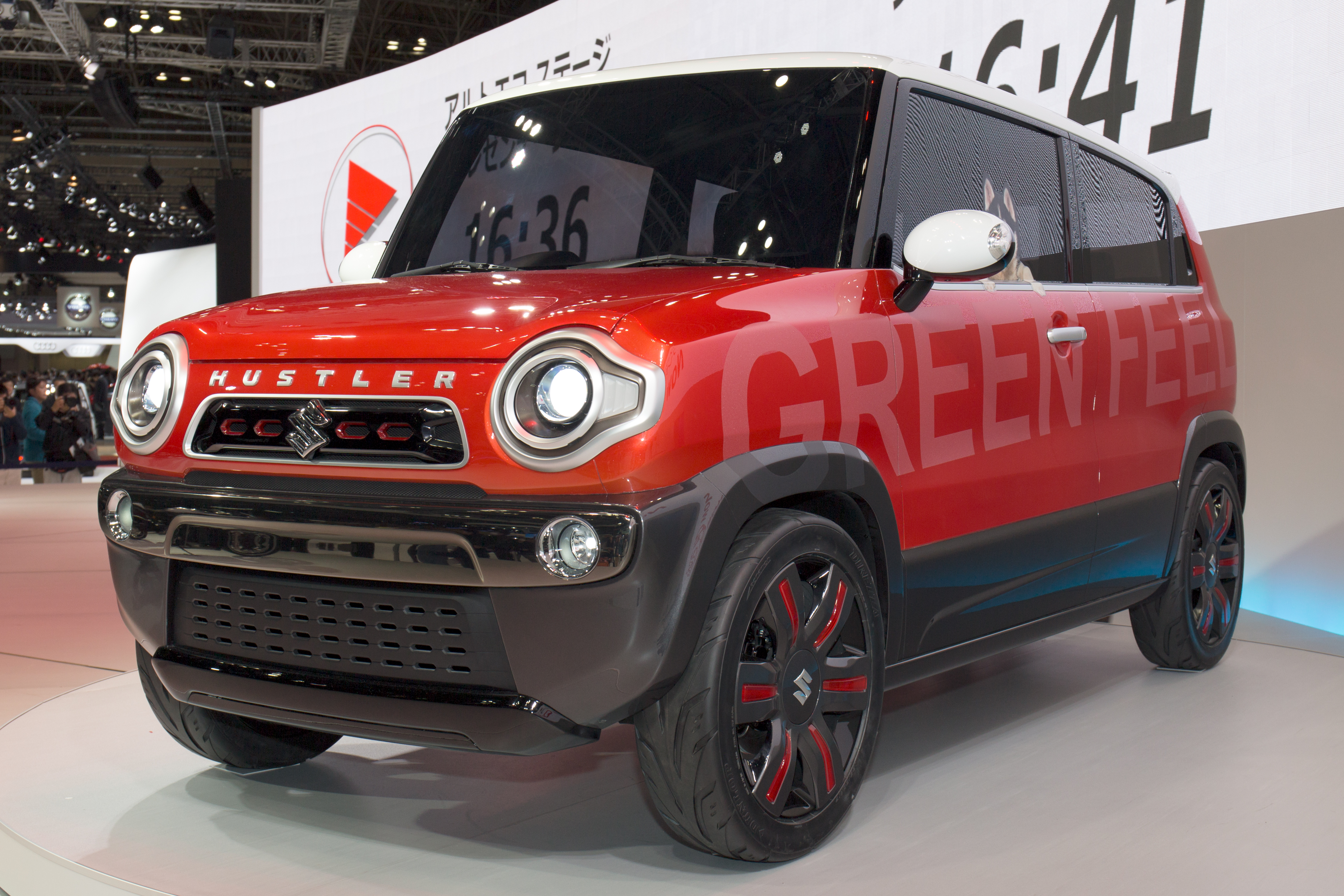
Suzuki Hustler Coupe

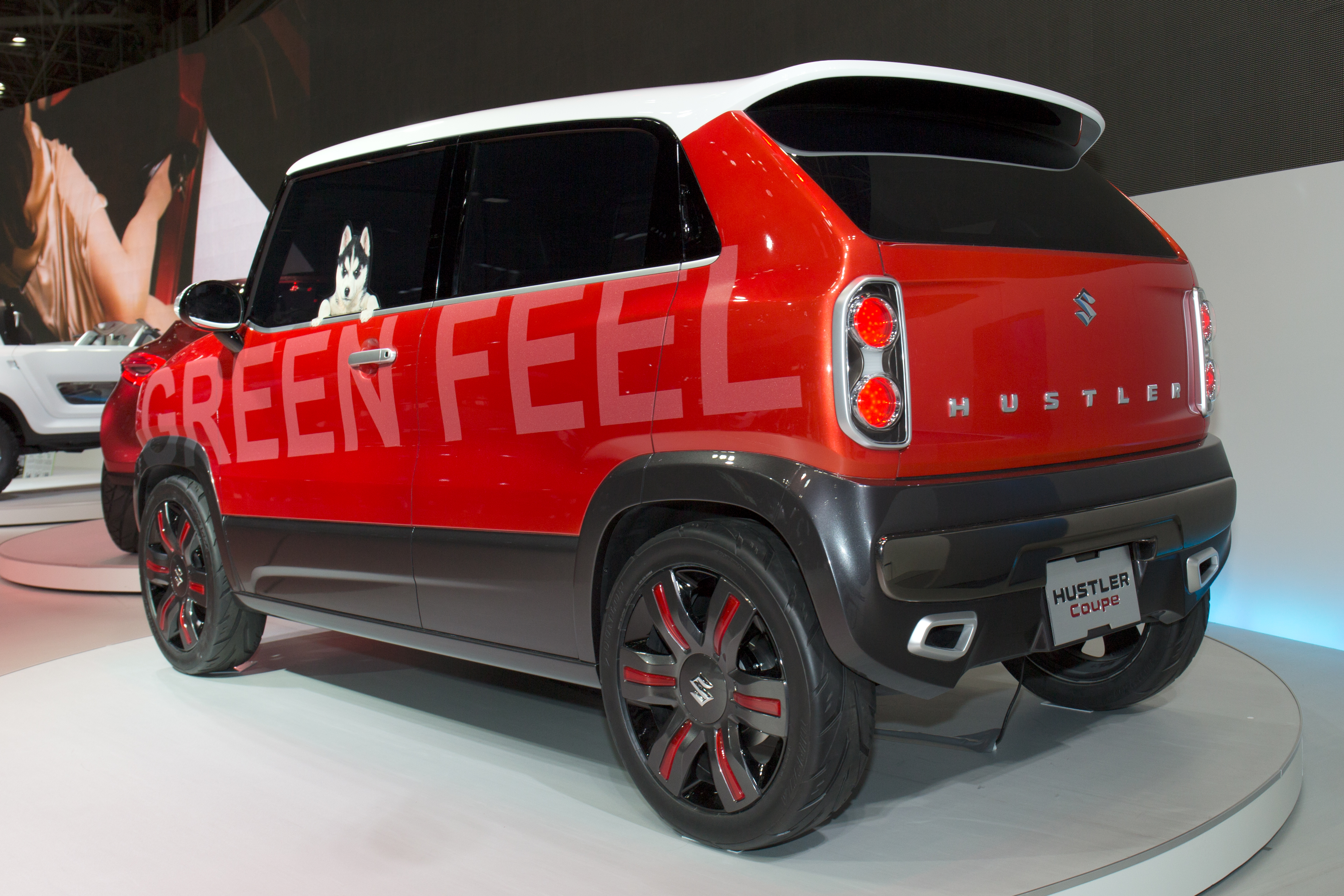
Suzuki Hustler Coupe (rear view)

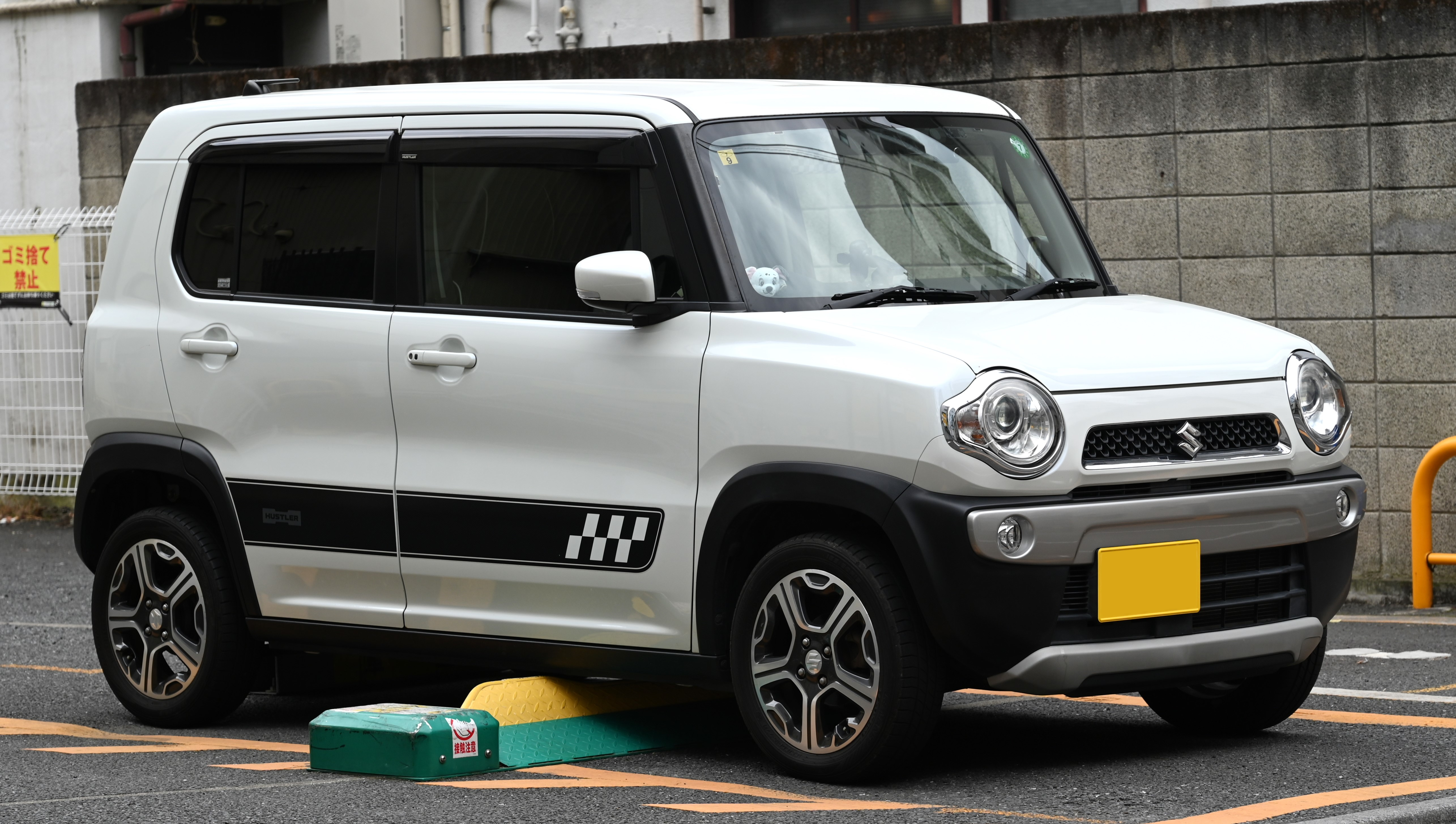
Suzuki Hustler X (MR31S/41S, Japan)

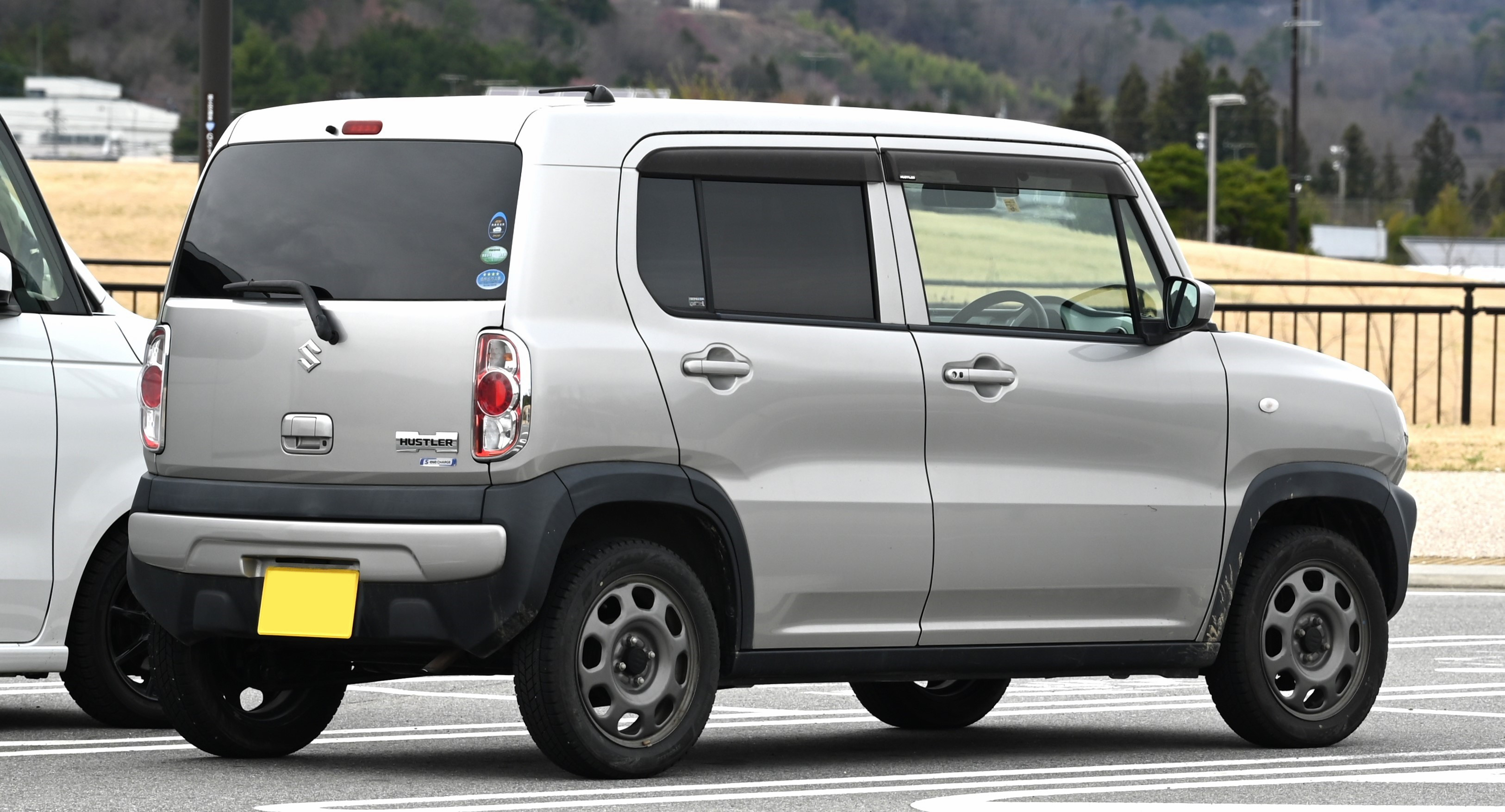
Suzuki Hustler G (MR31S, Japan)

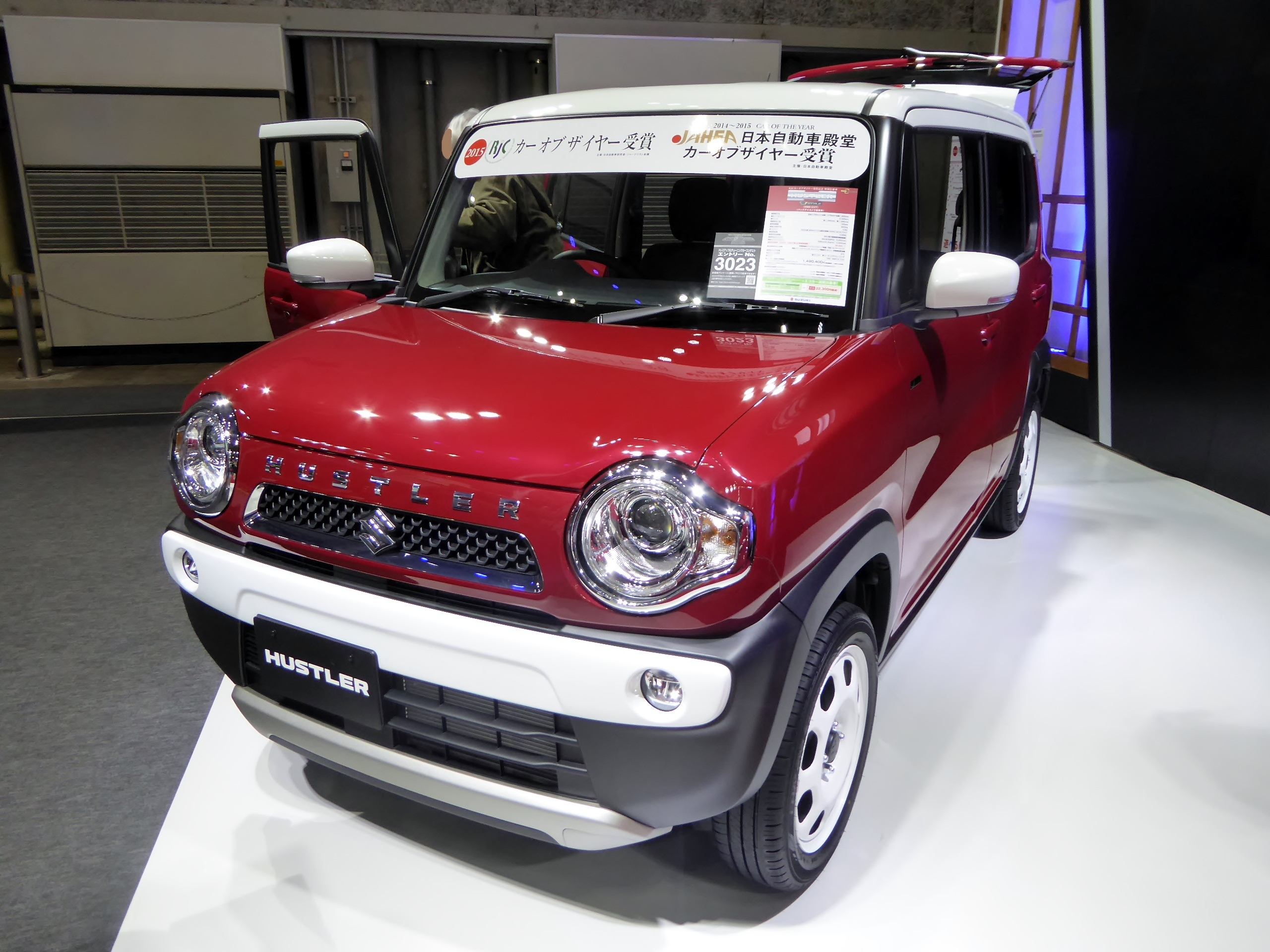
2015 J Style (MR31S)

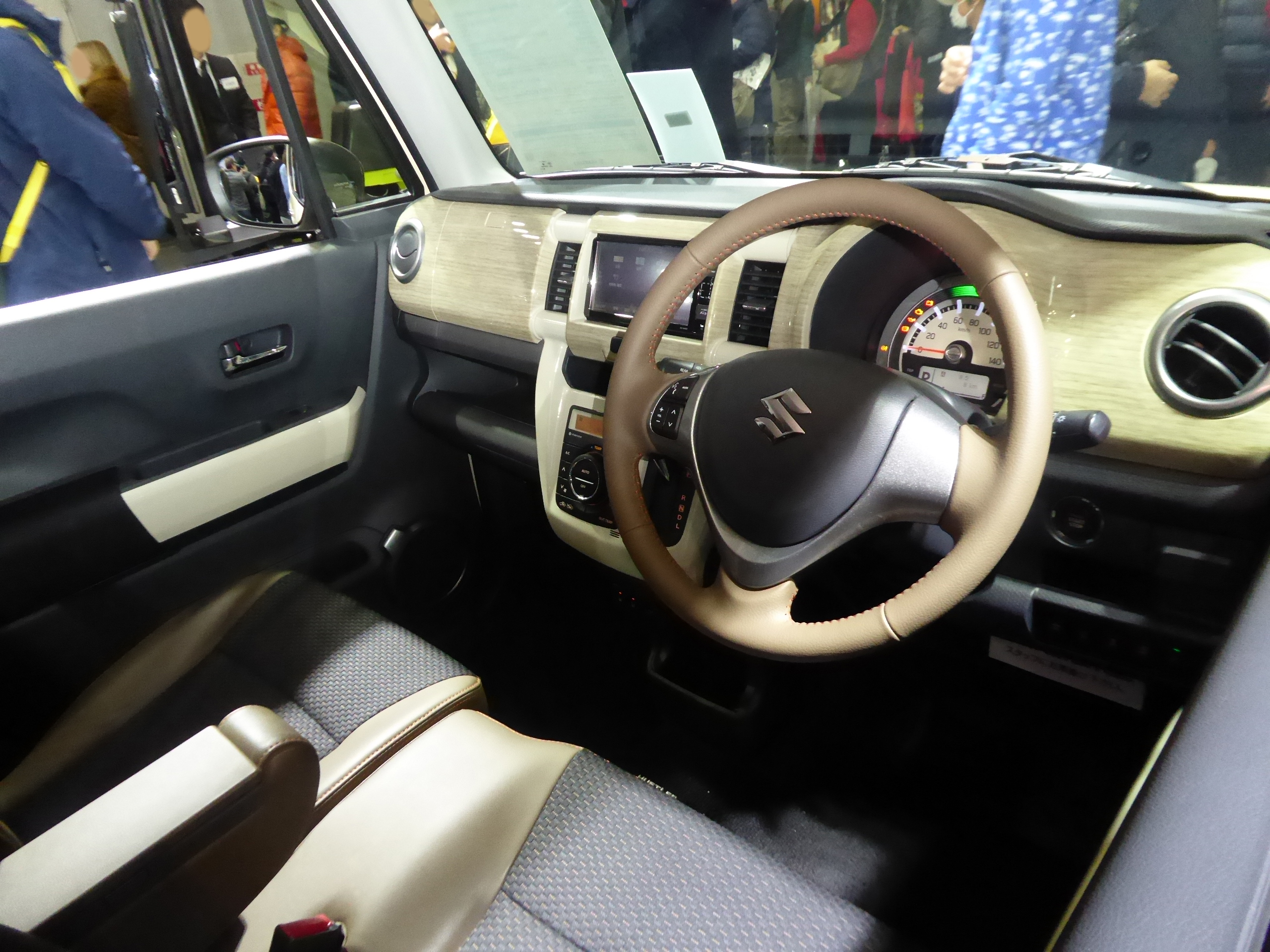
Interior

Mazda Flair Crossover

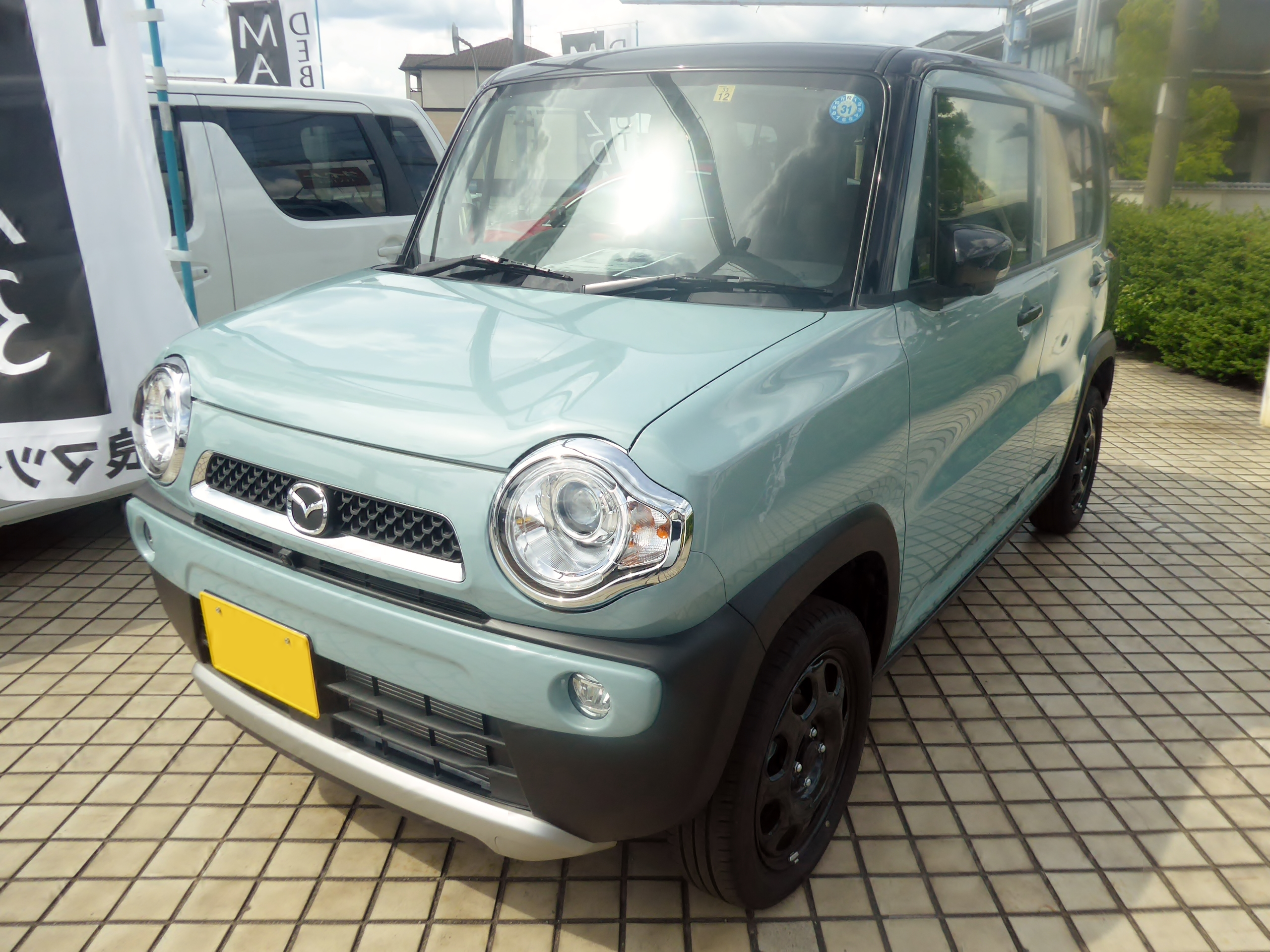
Mazda Flair Crossover XG Special (MS41S, Japan)

== Second generation (MR52S/MR92S; 2020) ==
Second generation
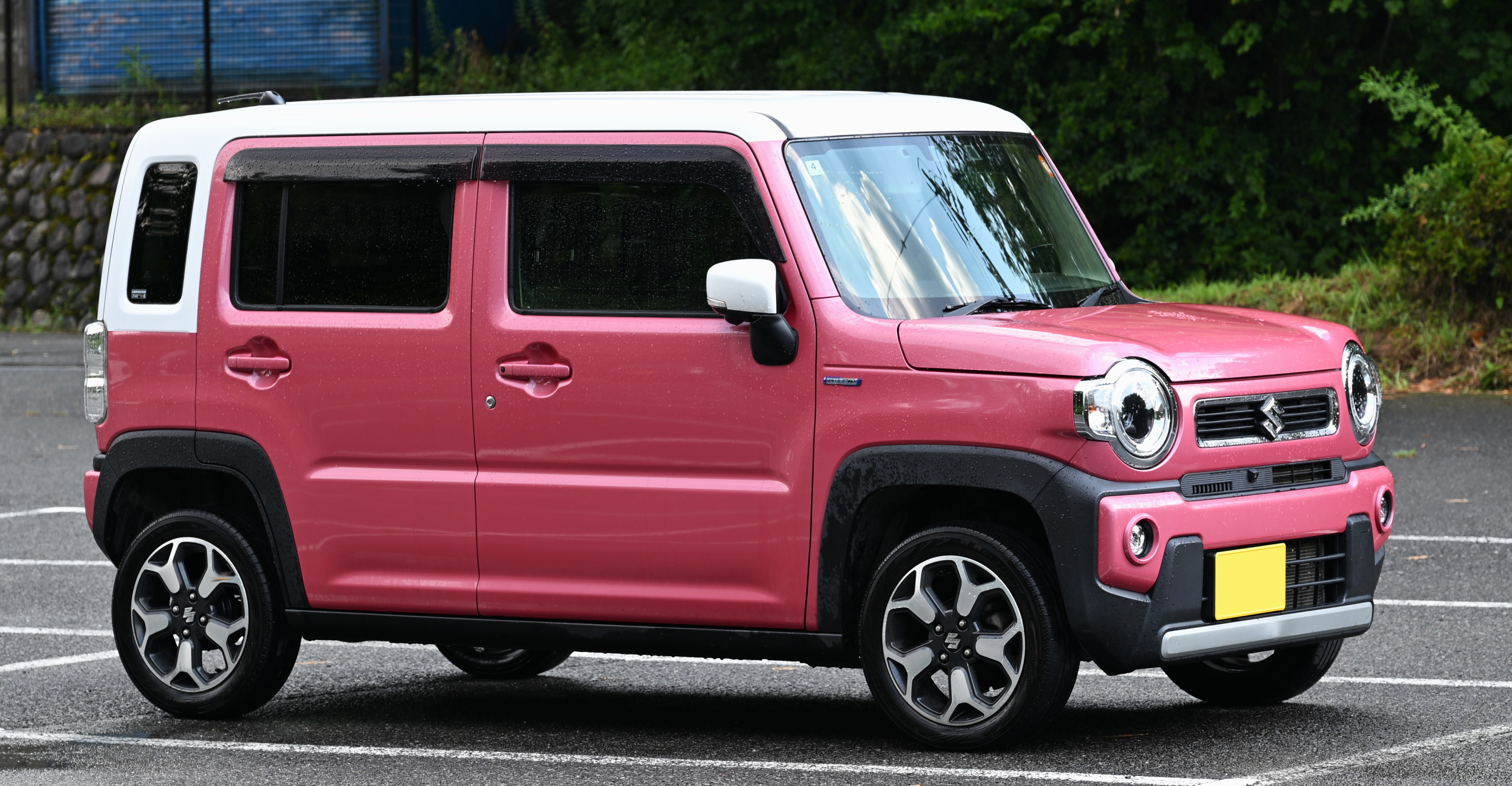
- 2020 Suzuki Hustler Hybrid X (MR92S, Japan)

Overview
- Model code: MR52S/MR92S
- Also called: Mazda Flair Crossover
- Production: January 2020 – present

Powertrain
- Engine: 658 cc R06D I3; 658 cc R06A turbo I3
- Electric motor: 2 PS (1.5 kW) WA05A / WA05C DC synchronous
- Power output: 36 kW (49 PS; 48 hp) (naturally aspirated); 47 kW (64 PS; 63 hp) (turbocharged)
- Transmission: CVT
- Hybrid drivetrain: MHEV with Integrated Starter Generator (ISG)

Dimensions
- Wheelbase: 2,460 mm (96.9 in)
- Length: 3,395 mm (133.7 in)
- Width: 1,475 mm (58.1 in)
- Height: 1,680 mm (66.1 in)
- Curb weight: 810–880 kg (1,786–1,940 lb)

The second generation Hustler was first shown in concept form at the 46th Tokyo Motor Show, October through November 2019. The car has been designed to be more similar to the fourth generation Jimny. It went on sale on 20 January 2020. The second generation largely retaining from the first generation design elements such as the round headlights, but the design was made more square. The rear window was made more upright, extending the roof length by approximately 120 mm (4.7 in). It was offered in Hybrid G, and Hybrid X. The Turbo were available in all grades. The second generation Hustler only available in CVT transmission.

The Flair Crossover was announced on 29 January 2020 and has been on sale since 27 February 2020. The naturally aspirated variants received the new R06D engine, producing 49 PS (36 kW), while the turbocharged variants retain the earlier R06A type. The chassis numbers reflect this, with MR92S denoting R06D cars and MR52S for the turbocharged models.

On 27 November 2020, the more rugged J Style was added. Based on Hybrid X, the J Style features a steel silver metallic bumper garnishes, chrome door handles, roof rails, a chrome front grille, and chrome fog lamp garnishes. A chrome HUSTLER emblem in front fascia.

In May 2024, the Hustler received an update. The LED headlights is standar for all grades. The Hybrid X and Hybrid X Turbo grades feature a Hustler emblem, chrome fog lamp garnish, which resembles the J Style grade. The more rugged called the Tough Wild was added. Features a black grille, chrome bumper, a "TOUGH WILD" emblem, 15-inch aluminium wheels, and roof rails.

The hybrid grades received a facelift in May 2026. Features a redesigned front fascia in Hybrid X and Hybrid G grades. The Hybrid G turbo was discontinued, leaving the Hybrid X turbo and Tough wild turbo grades.

Suzuki Hustler

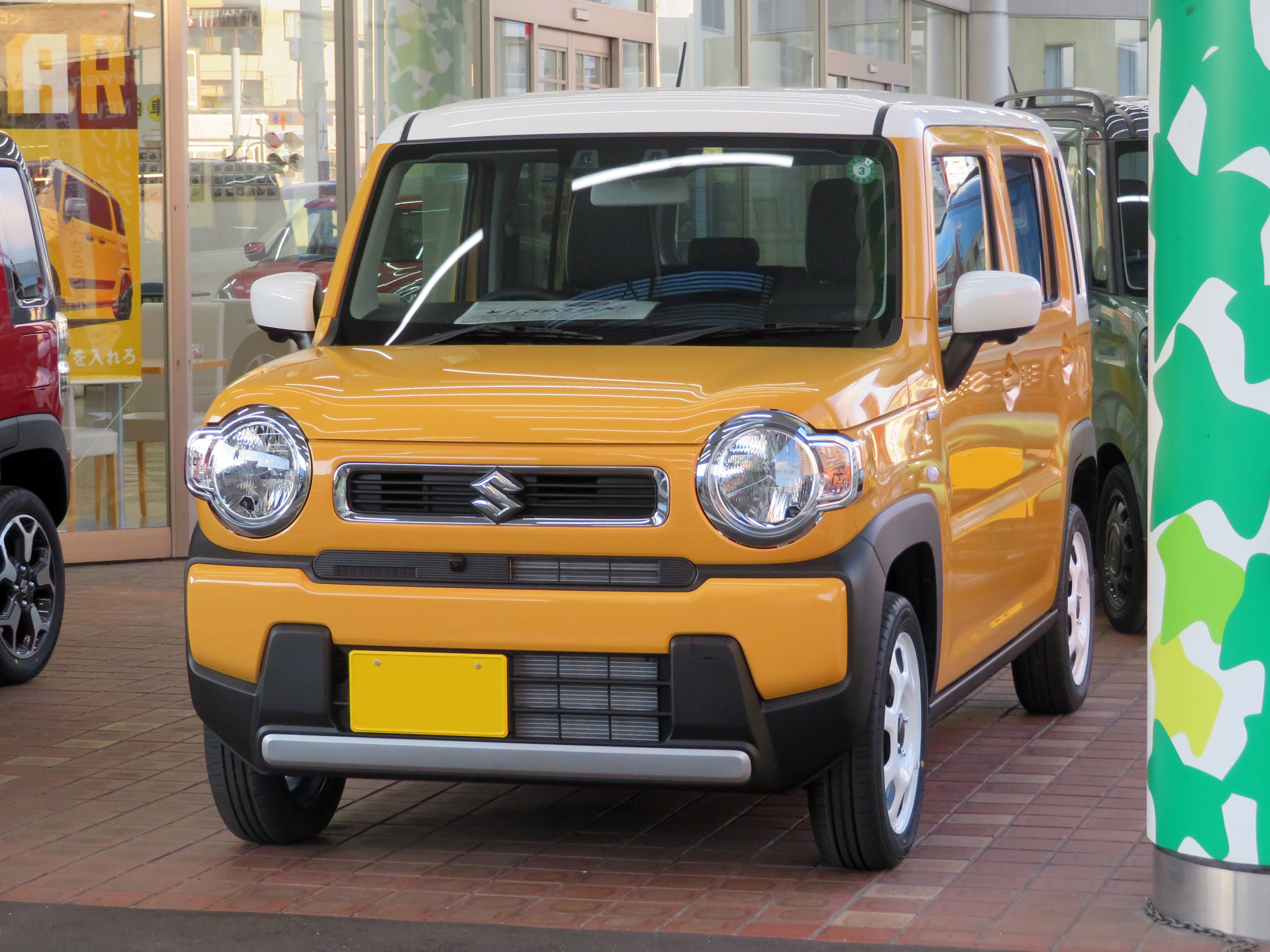
2020 Suzuki Hustler Hybrid G (MR92S, Japan)

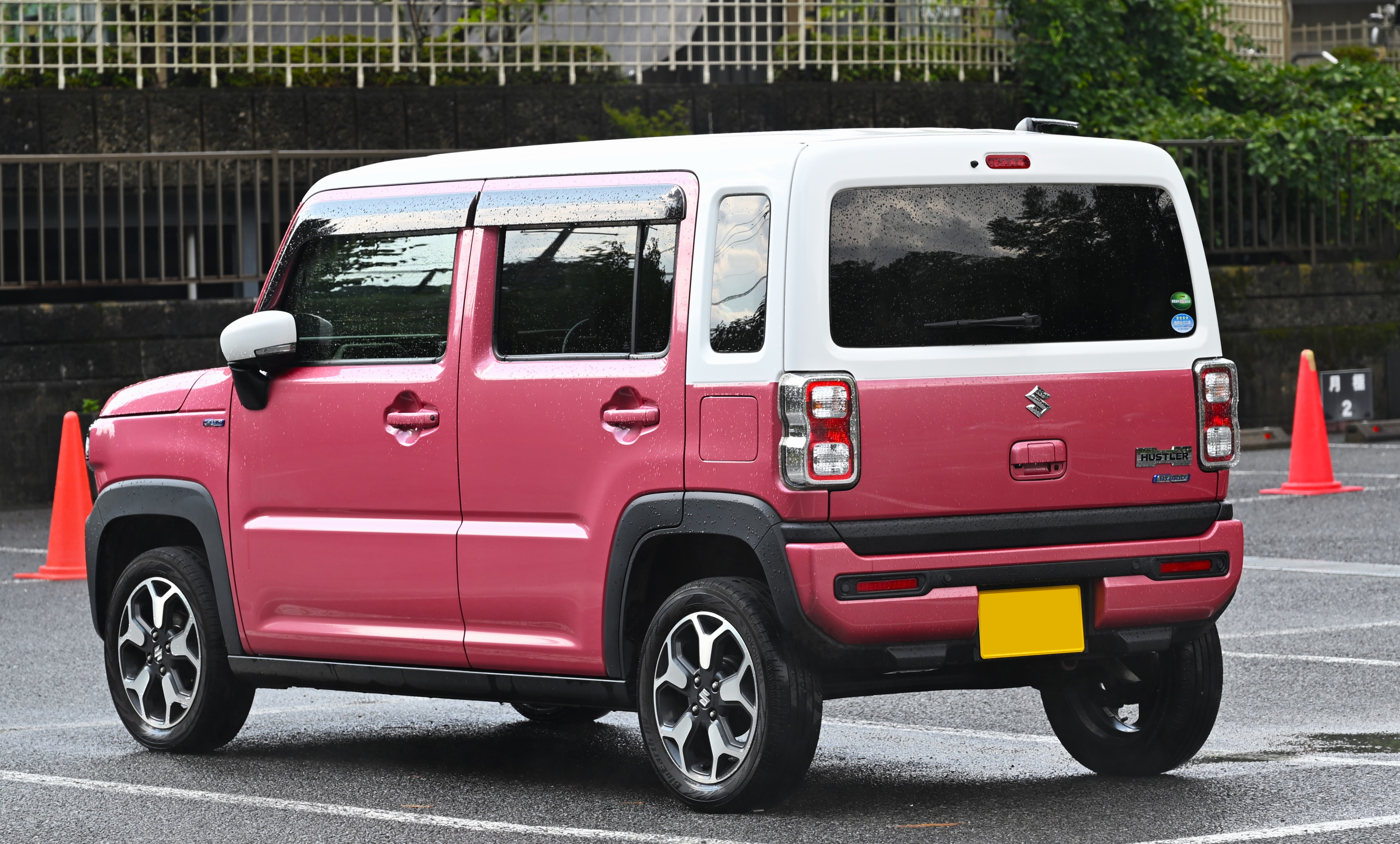
2020 Suzuki Hustler Hybrid X (MR92S, Japan)

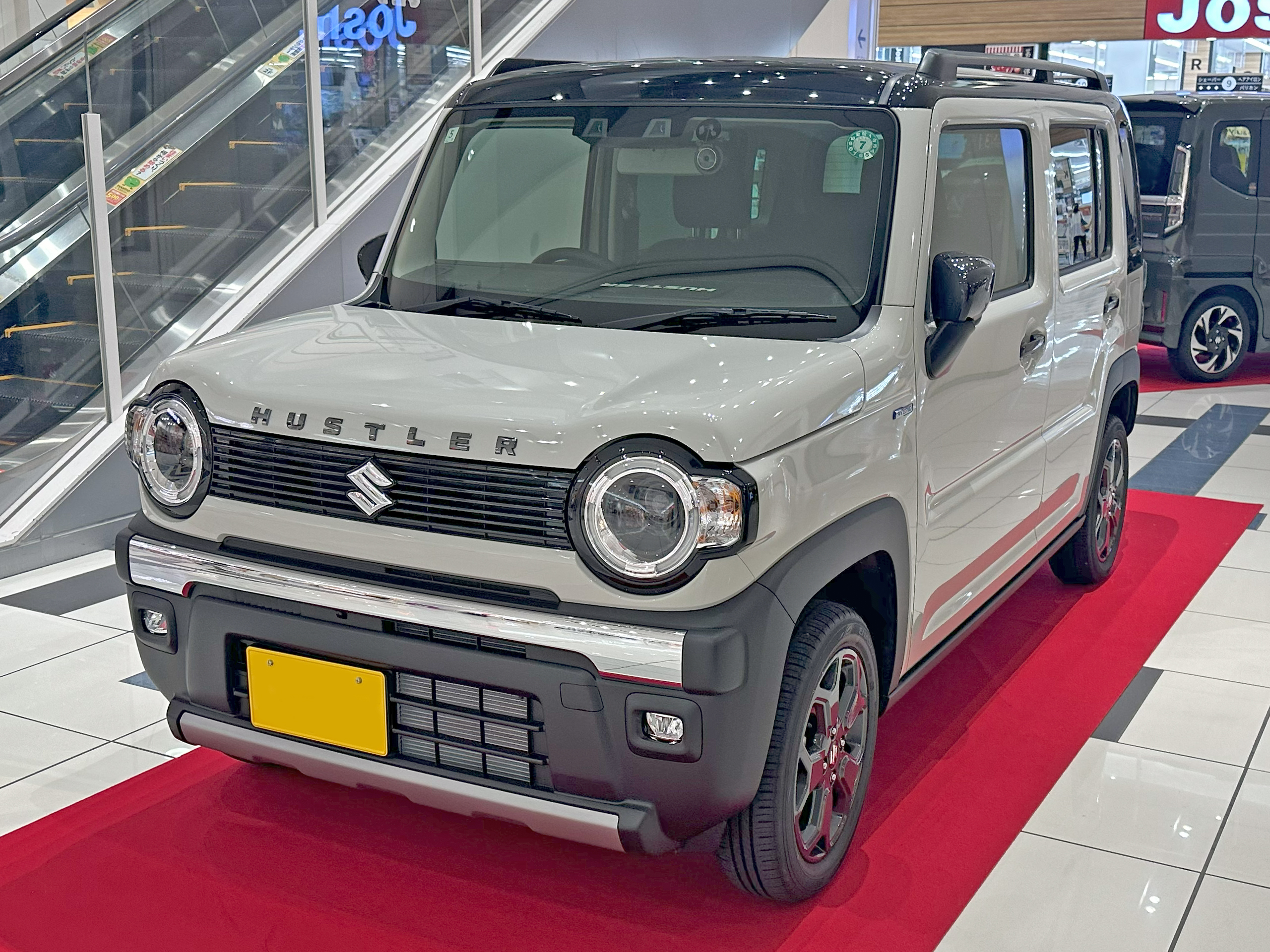
2024 Suzuki Hustler Tough Wild Turbo 2WD (MR52S, Japan)

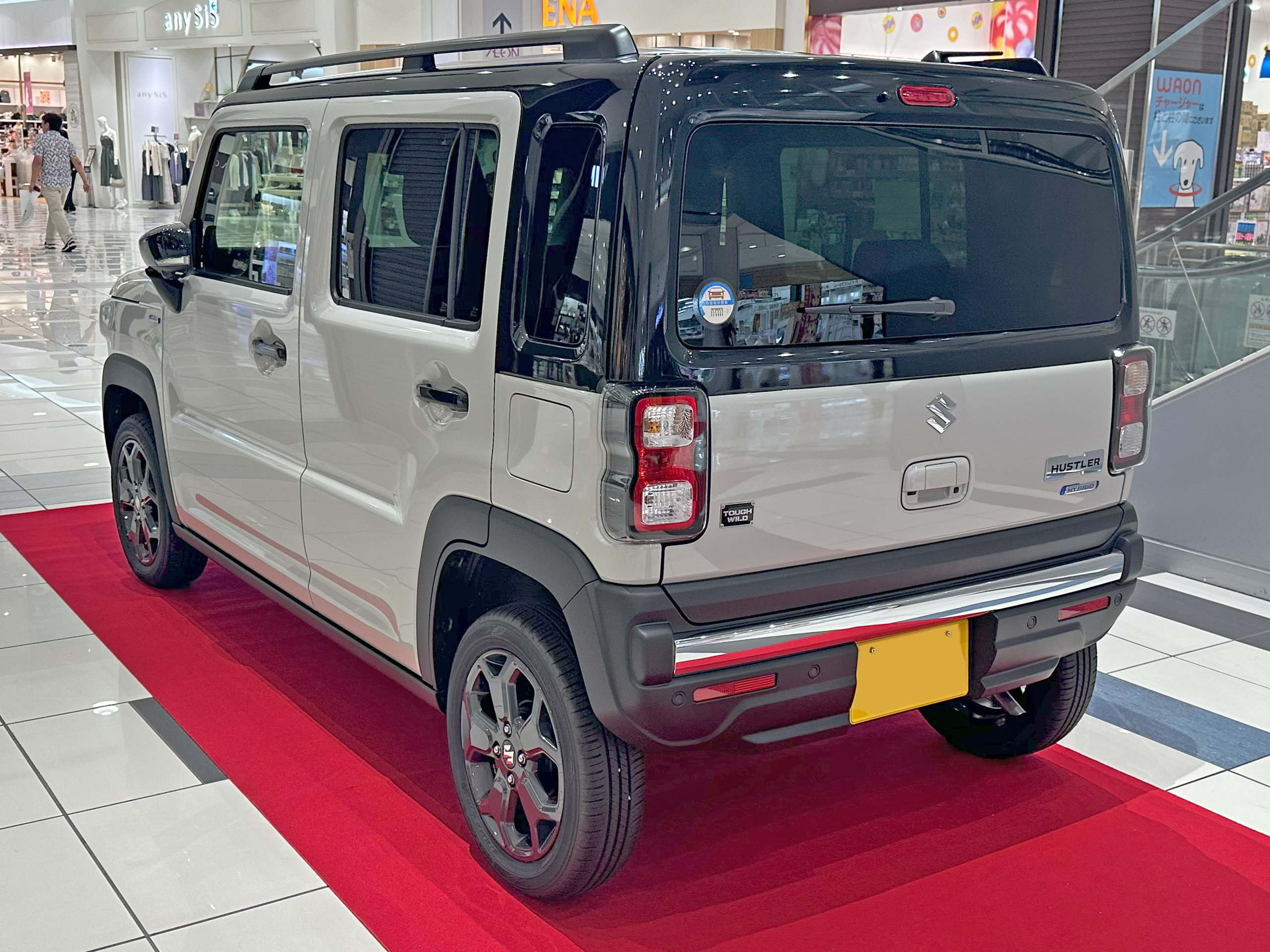
2024 Suzuki Hustler Tough Wild Turbo 2WD (MR52S, Japan)

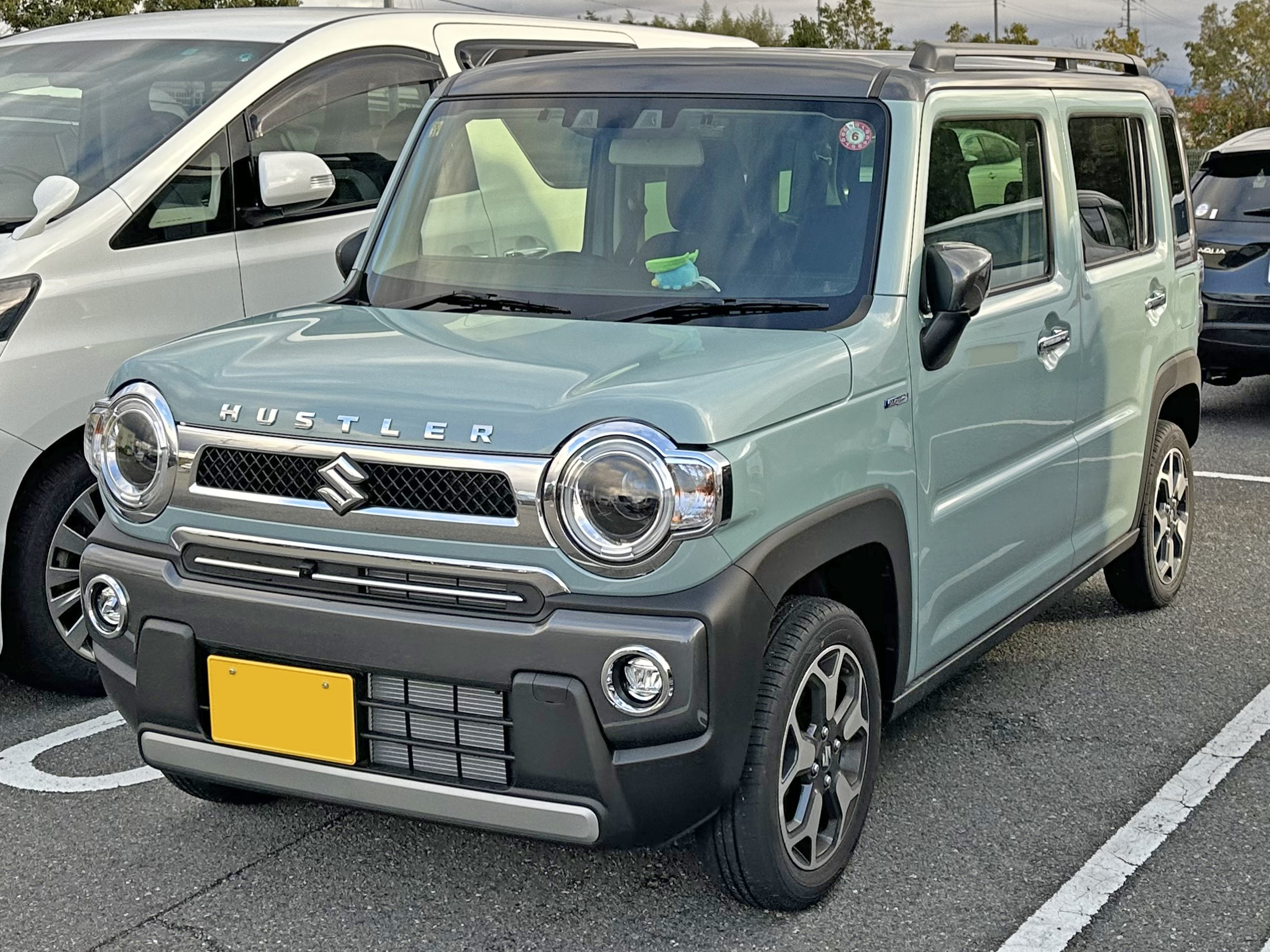
2020 Suzuki Hustler J Style (MR92S, Japan)

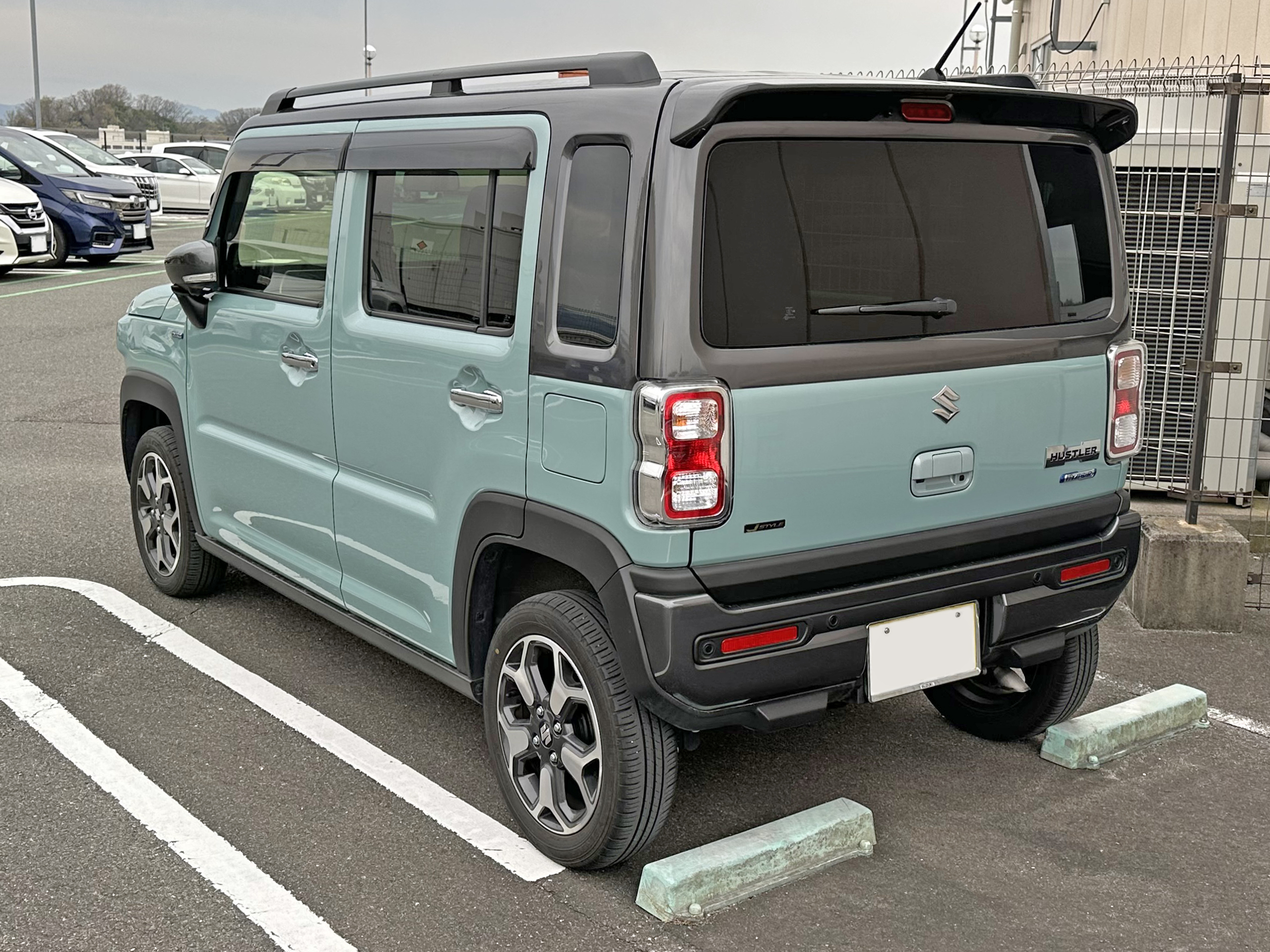
Rear view (J Style)

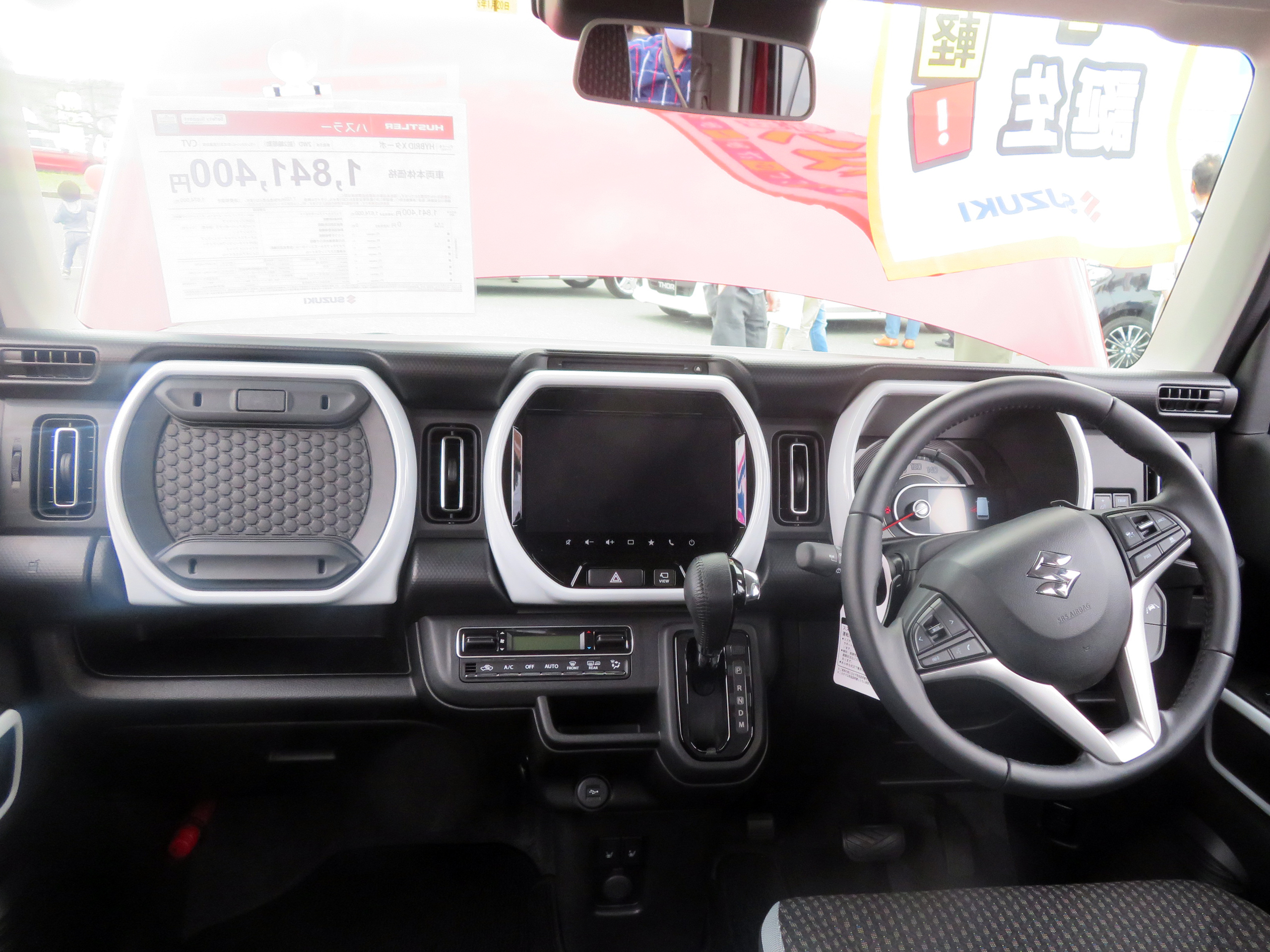
Interior

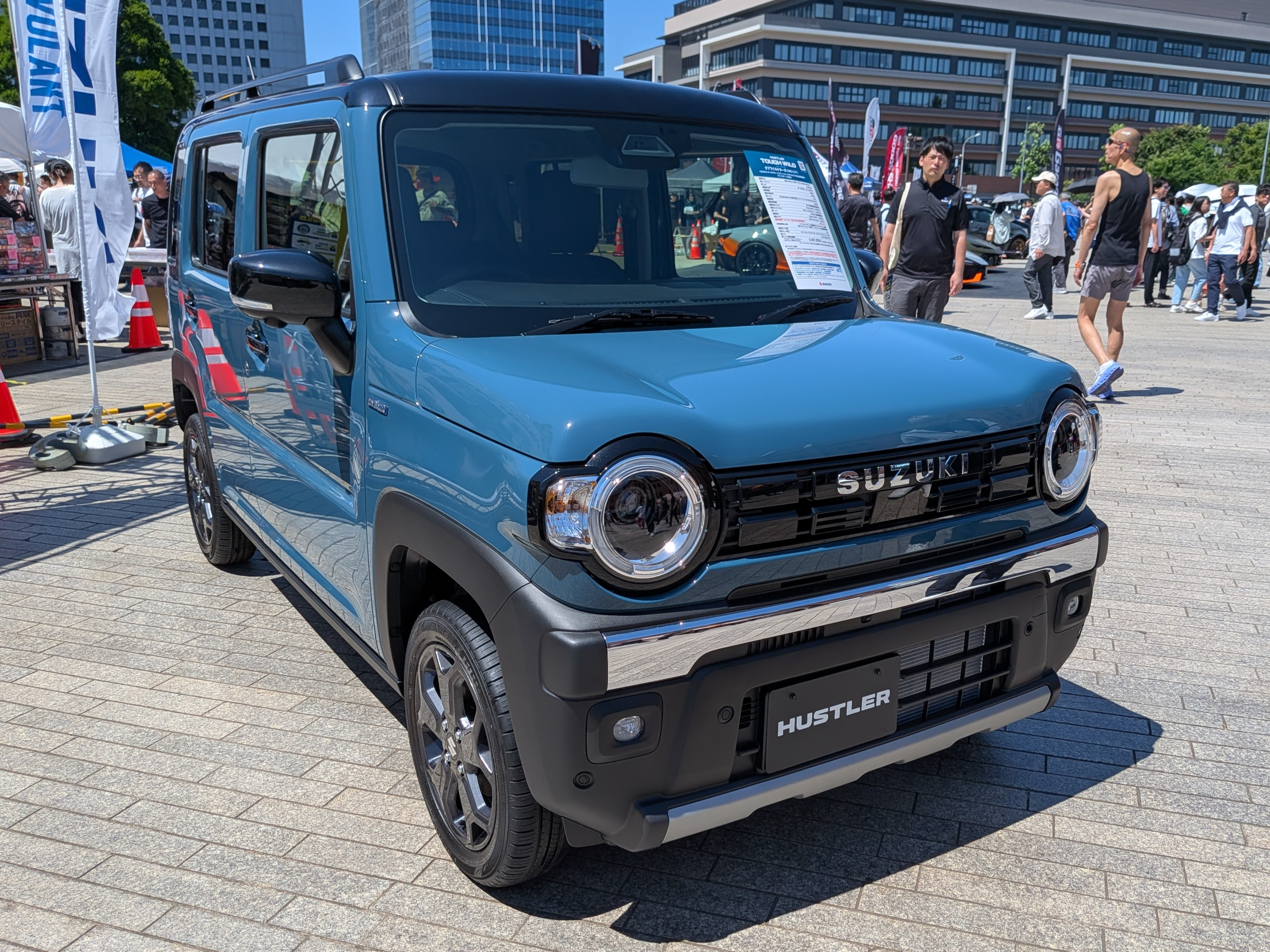
2026 Tough Wild Turbo facelift

Mazda Flair Crossover

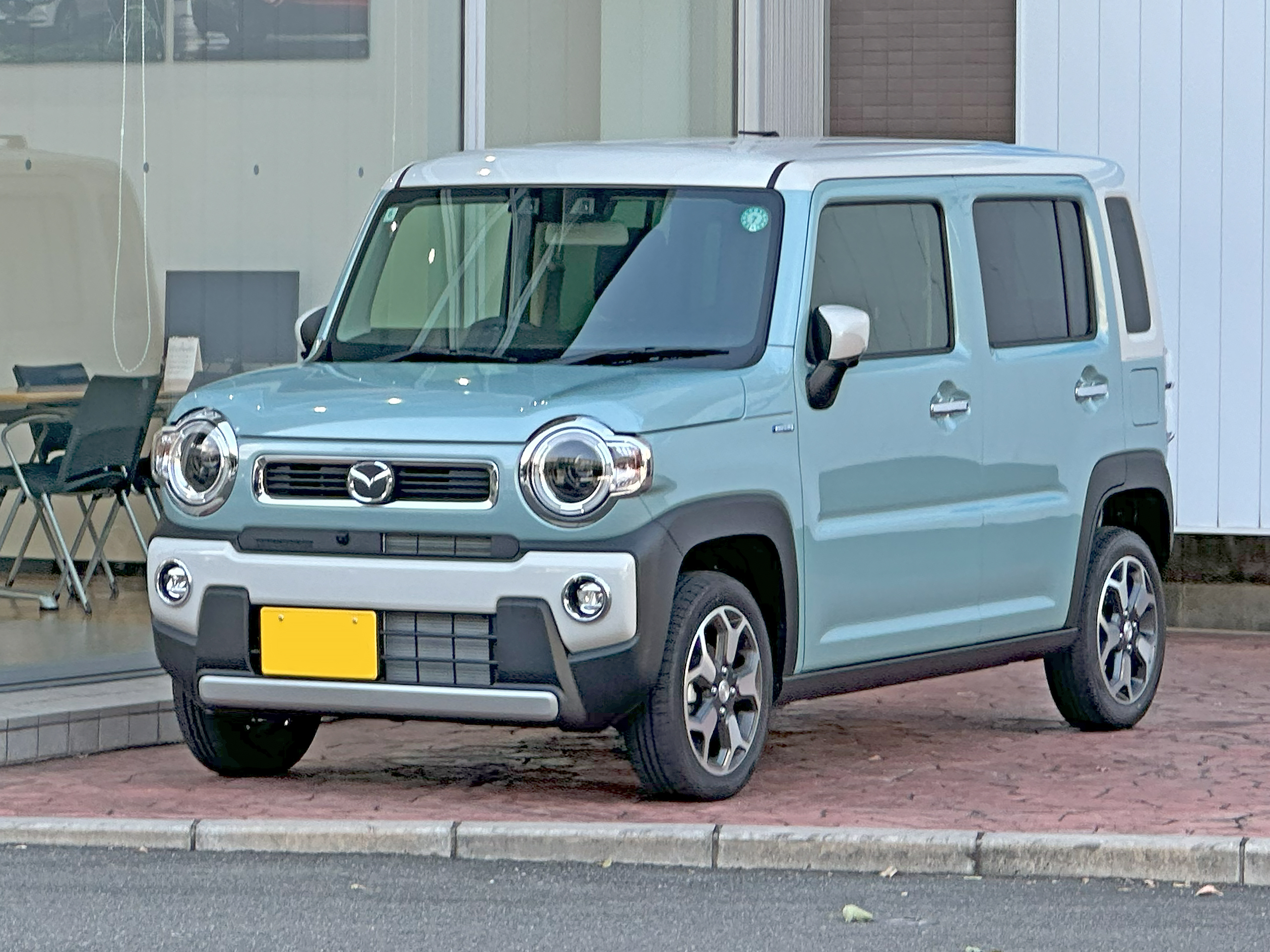
2024 Mazda Flair Crossover XT 2WD (MS52S, Japan)

== Sales ==
In December 2023, Suzuki set monthly sales target at 5,000 units. Hustler sales exceeded the target which was accordingly increased to 6,000 units.

Year	Sales
2014	104,233
2015	95,557
2016	85,763
2017	72,600
2018	65,291
2019	58,399
2020	80,114
2021	82,486
2022	70,373
2023	82,720
2024	92,818
2025	87,972
