= Suzuki Kei =

Suzuki Kei (HN11S/HN12S/HN21S/HN22S)
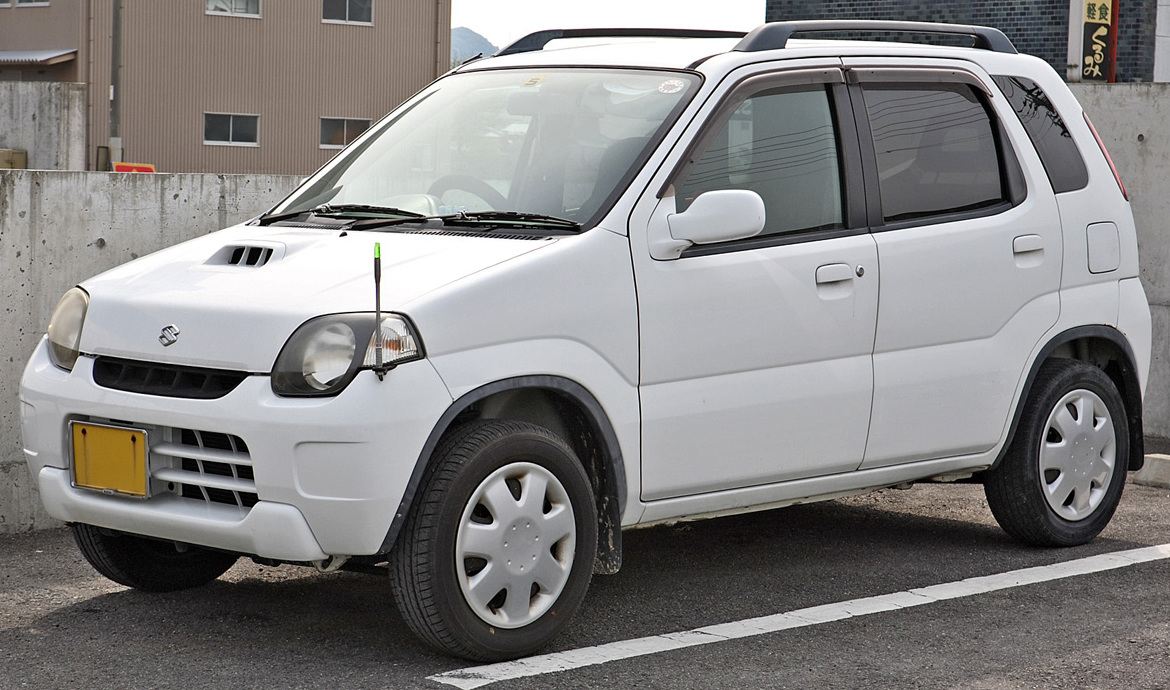
- 1999–2000 Suzuki Kei 5-door

Overview
- Manufacturer: Suzuki
- Also called: Mazda Laputa
- Production: 1998–2009
- Assembly: Japan

Body and chassis
- Class: Kei car
- Body style: 3-/5-door hatchback
- Layout: Front-engine, front-wheel-drive; Front-engine, four-wheel-drive
- Related: Suzuki Alto; Suzuki Ignis (first generation)

Powertrain
- Engine: Petrol: 657 cc F6A turbo I3; 658 cc K6A I3; 658 cc K6A turbo I3
- Transmission: 5-speed manual; 3-speed automatic; 4-speed automatic

Dimensions
- Wheelbase: 2,360 mm (92.9 in)
- Length: 3,395 mm (133.7 in)
- Width: 1,475 mm (58.1 in)
- Height: 1,545 mm (60.8 in)
- Kerb weight: 820 kg (1,808 lb)

Chronology
- Successor: Suzuki Hustler

The Suzuki Kei (Japanese: スズキ・Kei (ケイ), Hepburn: Suzuki Kei) is a kei car produced by Suzuki between 1998 and 2009. Originally only available as a three-door hatchback, a five-door version arrived in the third quarter of 1999. The car received a facelift in late 2000, when the three-door version was also dropped, and another facelift in 2001, including a newer dashboard.

== Overview ==
The Kei was launched in October 1998, as the response to the revision of the Kei car dimensions.

Initially, it was only available in a 3-door version, but a 5-door version was added in March 1999. Early grades include G, X, and S grades. To avoid with the Jimny, from 2000 onwards, the 3-door model was dropped and it was only available in a 5-door. The facelift version carried out in October 2000, the front fascia was significantly changed. The Kei received the facelift again in April 2006, features a new front bumper and grille design.

As the official sponsor of the 2001 FIS Freestyle Cup, a special edition called FIS Freestyle World Cup Limited was released along with the Jimny and Escudo. In the same year Suzuki was collaborated with Japanese fashion designer Kansai Yamamoto called the up to you KANSAI.

The first generation Ignis sharing many common parts from Suzuki Kei. From May 1999 to 2006, Suzuki also produced the Mazda Laputa (マツダ・ラピュタ, Matsuda Rapyuta) as Mazda's rebadged version of the Kei..

In 2003, the grade lineup was streamlined, consolidating it into two grades: A grade equipped with the K6A VVT engine and B Turbo equipped with the K6A M Turbo engine. The Kei continued to be sold for 11 years, undergoing several minor changes, but production ended in 2009. However, the direct successor Hustler which was launched in December 2013.

== Variants ==
=== Kei Special ===
The more rugged Kei Special was released in May 1999. Based on the 3-door S-type that existed in the initial production, this vehicle featuring sporty, exclusive accessories. It was available in 5-speed manual or 4-speed automatic transmission option, and either front-wheel drive or four-wheel drive drivetrain. It is feature a dedicated engine hood cover, rugged bumper and side skirts with integrated large fog lamps, a roof end spoiler.

=== Kei Sports ===
Released in October 2000. The Kei Sport, features a horizontal line grille, also features a sporty interior with black coloured seats and a large-diameter tachometer. It was available in Sport F and Sport grades. Similar to the Alto Works, it was available in offered the F6A DOHC and K6A DOHC engines and paired with a 5-speed manual or 4-speed automatic options and FF/4WD drivetrains. In April 2001, only the K6A DOHC engine was available and the lower Sport F was discontinued.

=== Kei Works ===
On 12 November 2002, Suzuki released the Kei Works as successor of the Kei Sport variant and due to response to the revival the "Works" nameplate which was discontinued in 2000. It featured the same engine as the Alto Works. The Kei Works featuring a new grille and a large bumper with integrated fog lights It is equipped with 15-inch aluminum wheels, four-wheel disc brakes, and Recaro seats. The Kei Works powered by tuned K6A, produces 64 PS (47 kW; 63 hp) and paired with either 4-speed automatic or 5-speed manual options.

During this period, the Kei Works were not as popular as expected, largely because it was slower and heavier than the Alto Works.

== Gallery ==
Suzuki Kei

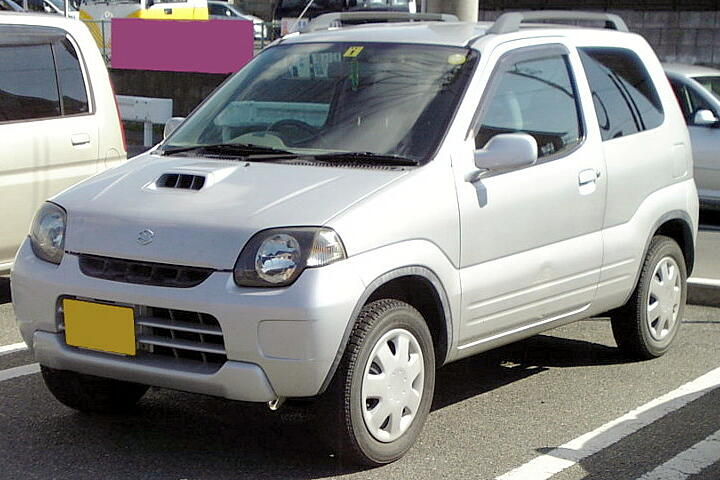
1998–2000 Suzuki Kei 3-door

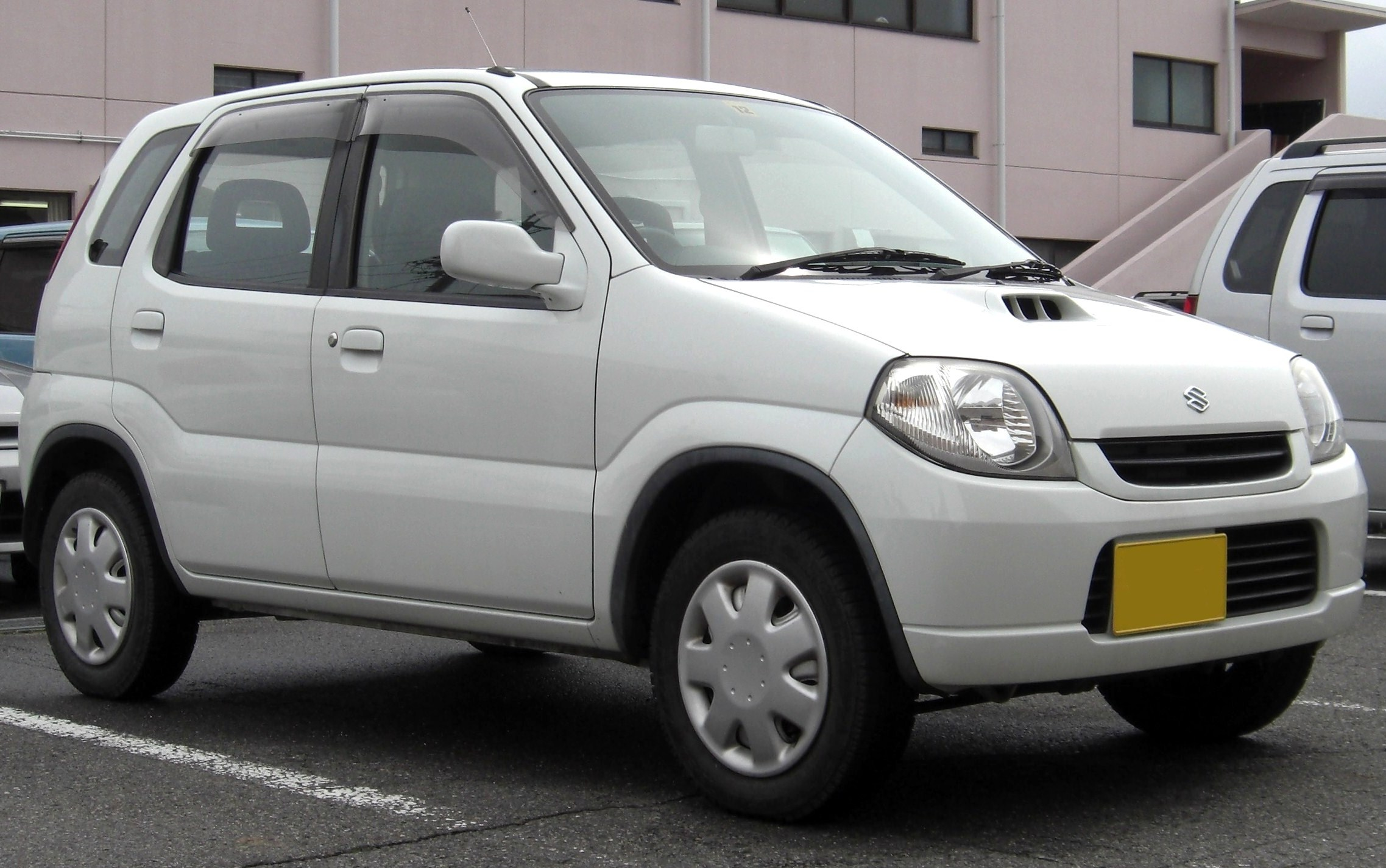
2000–2006 Suzuki Kei 5-door

Suzuki Kei Special

Suzuki Kei Special

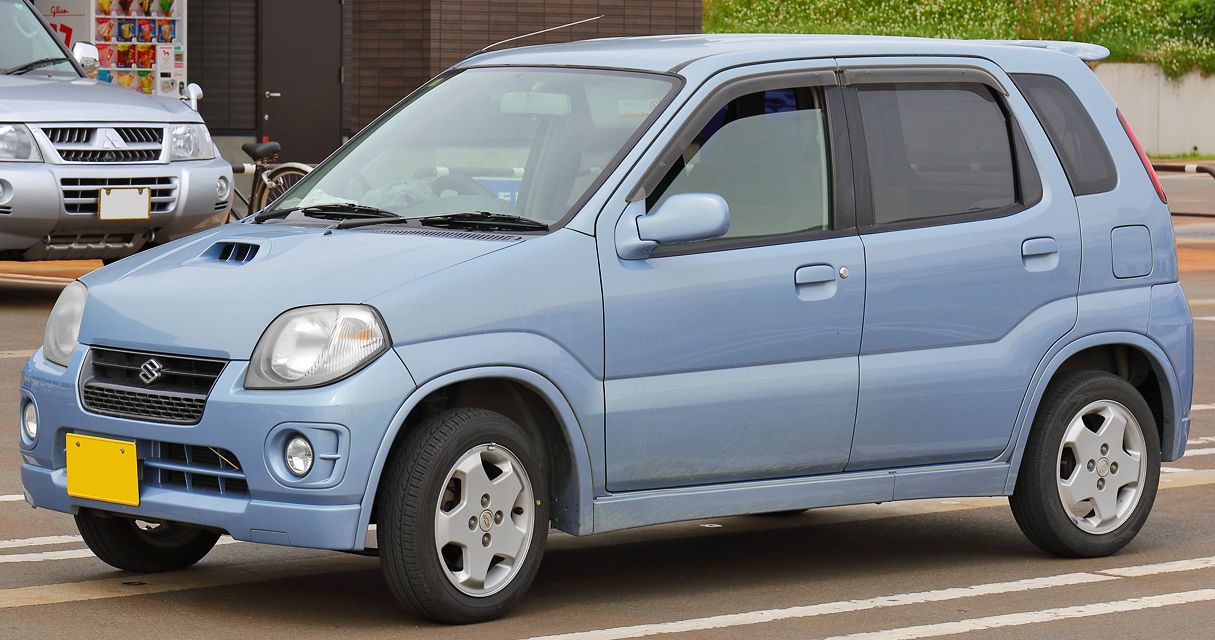
2000–2002 Suzuki Kei Sport 5-door

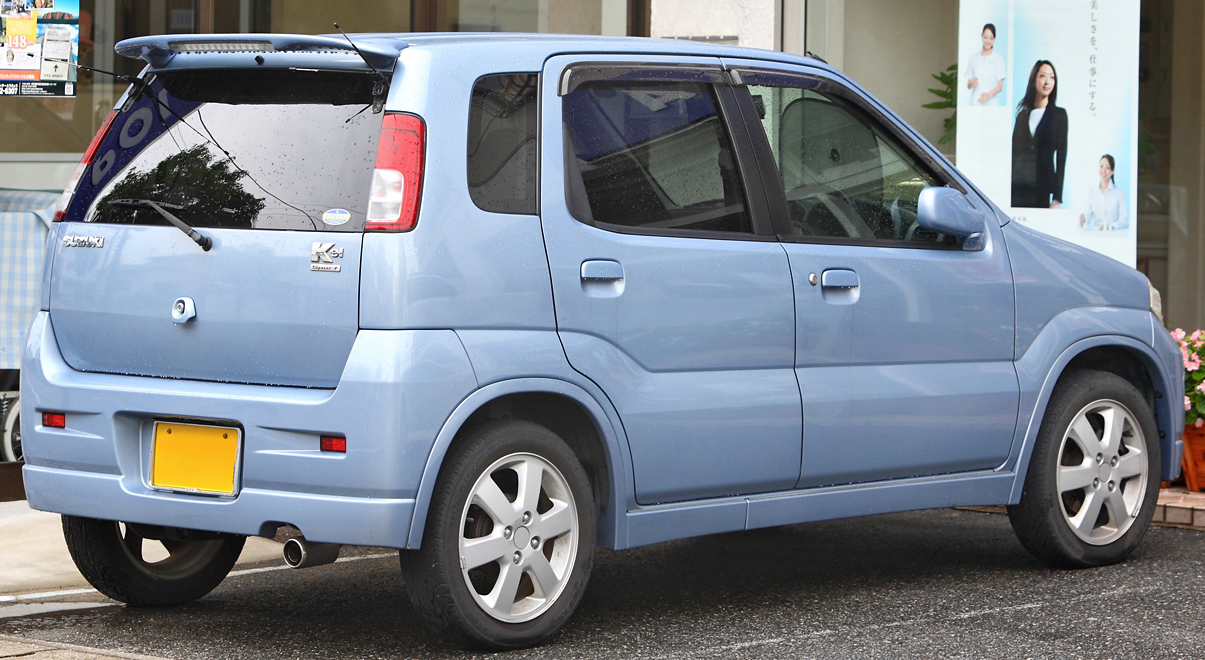
2000–2002 Suzuki Kei Sport 5-door

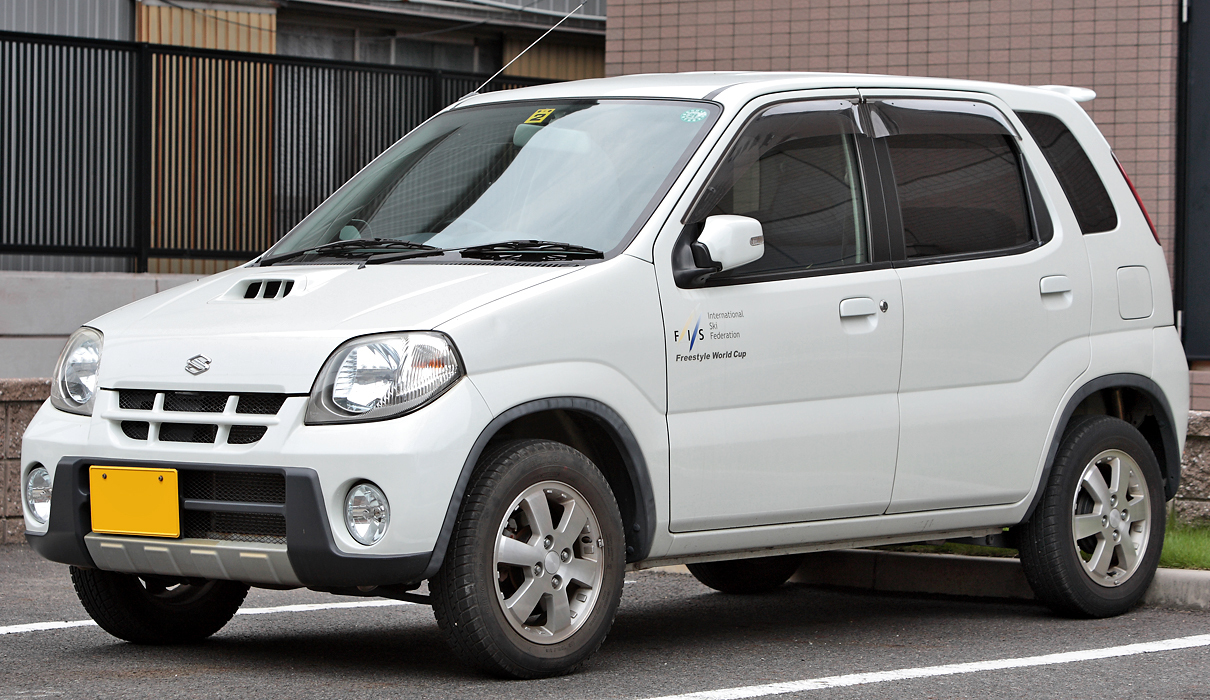
2002 Suzuki Kei FIS Freestyle World Cup Limited version

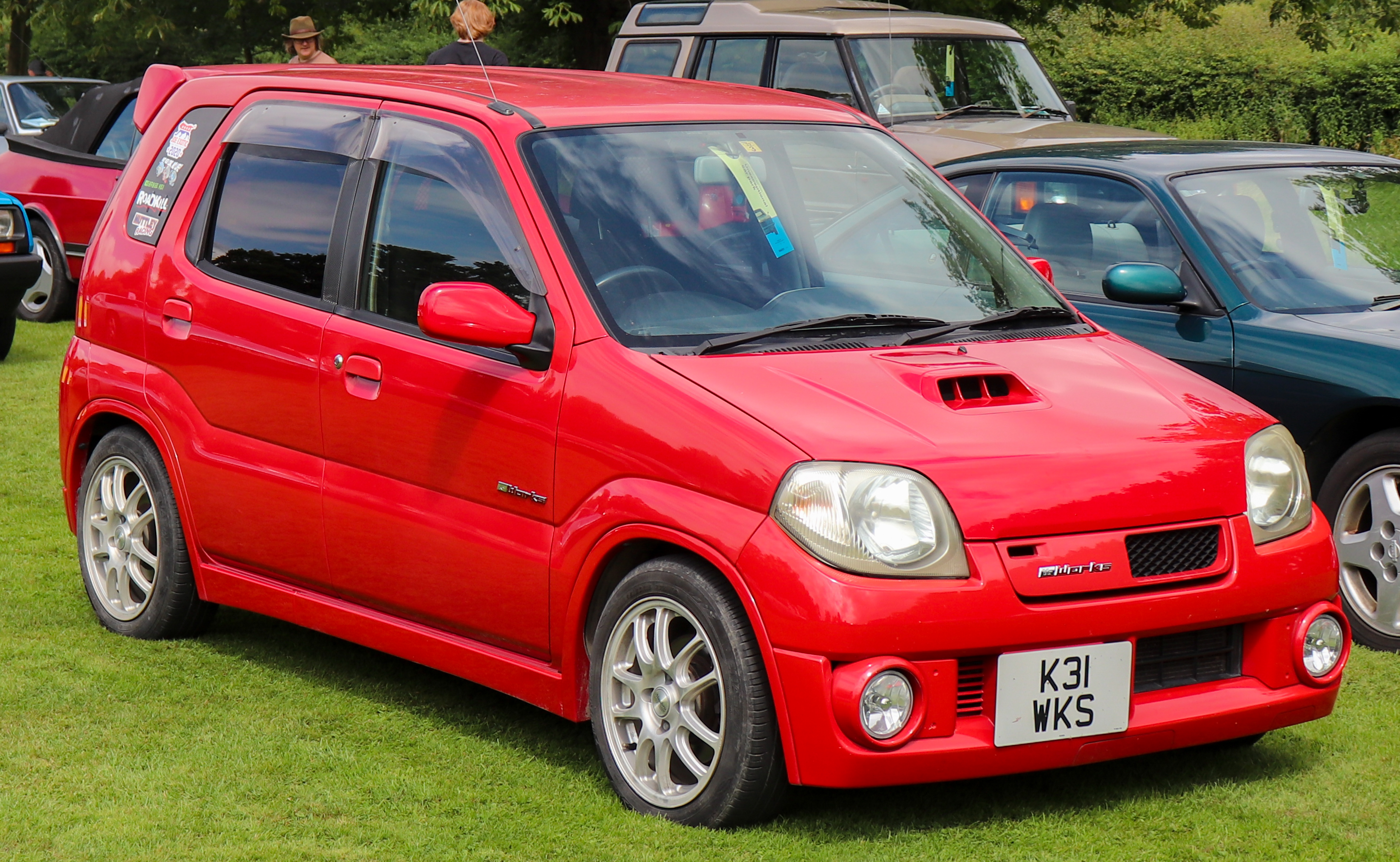
2002–2009 Suzuki Kei Works

2002–2009 Suzuki Kei Works

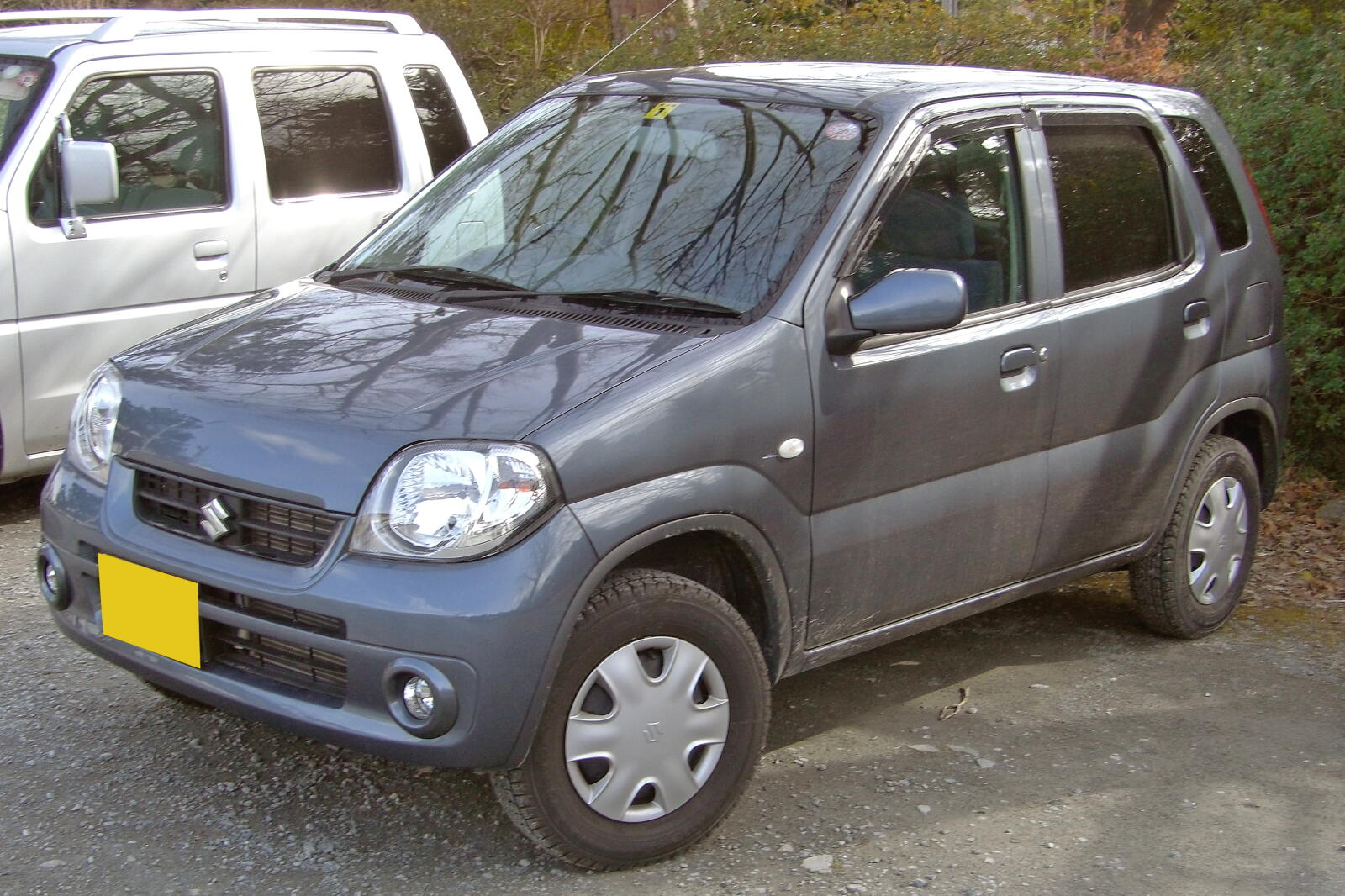
2006–2009 Suzuki Kei 5-door

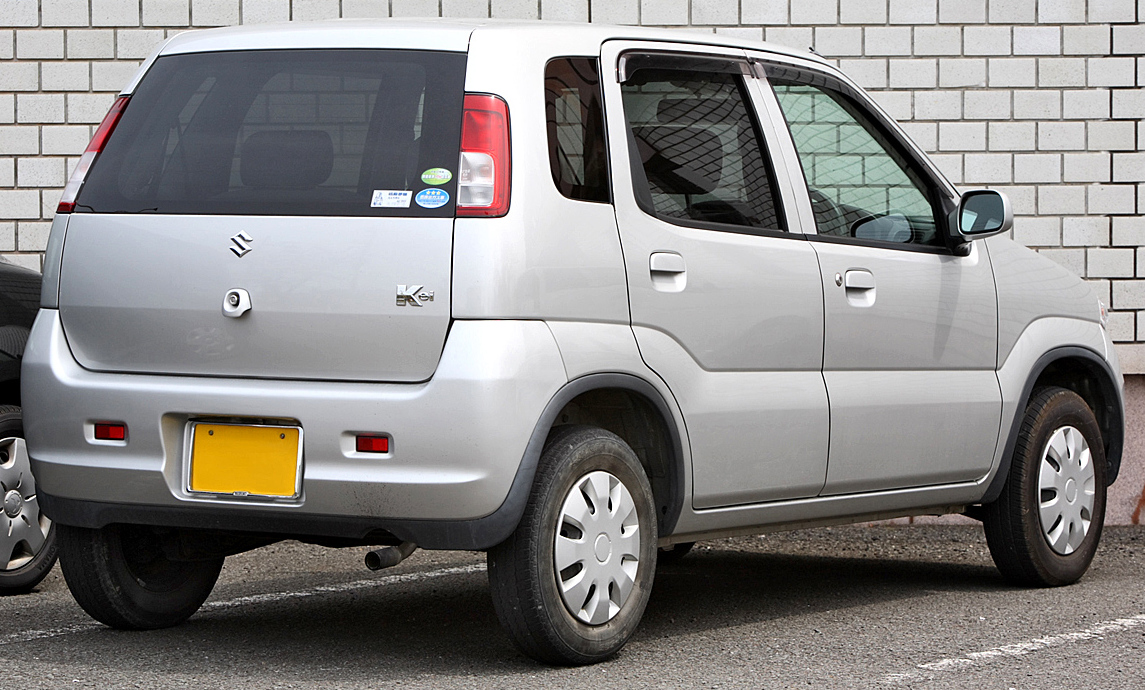
2006–2009 Suzuki Kei 5-door

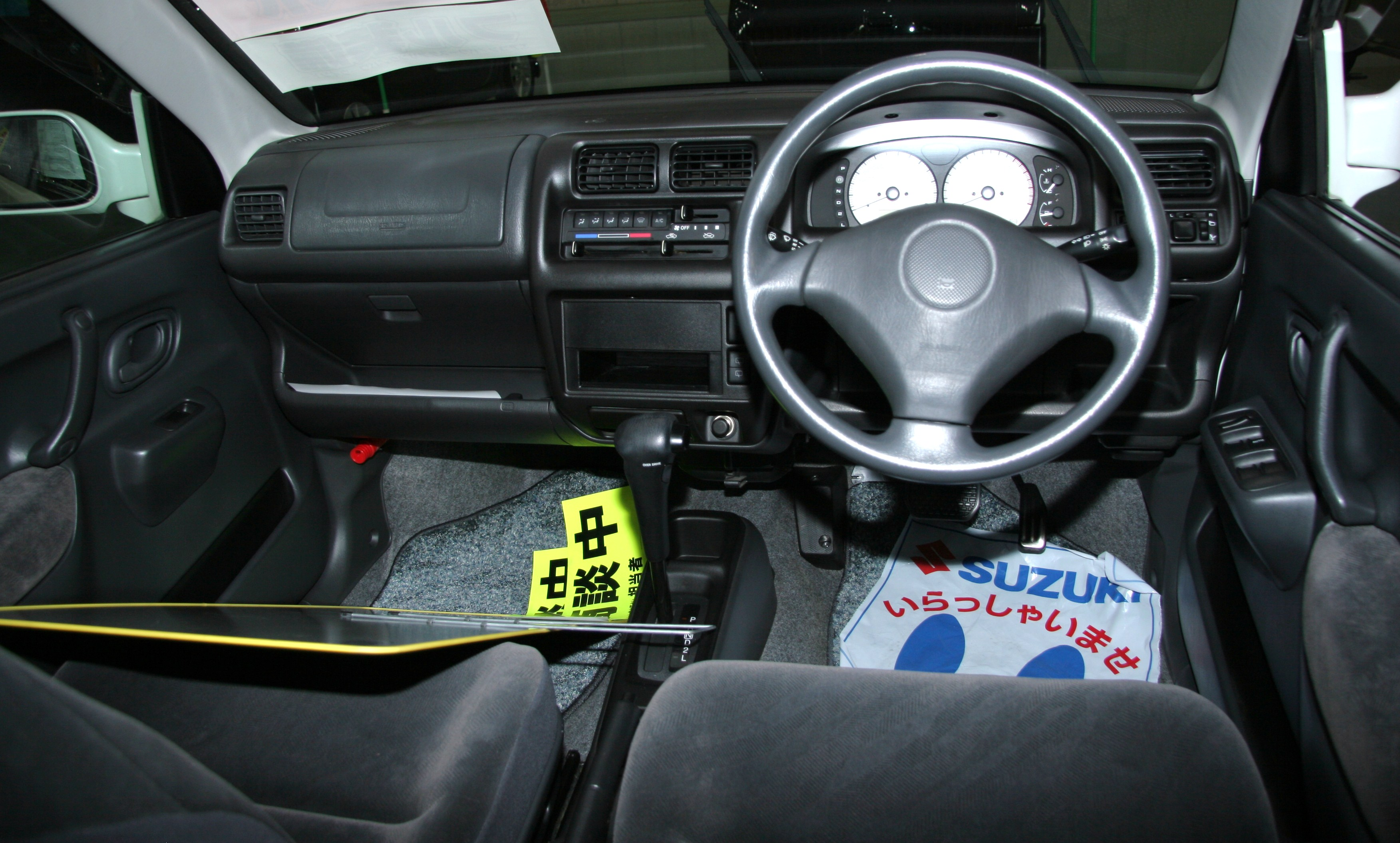
Interior

Mazda Laputa

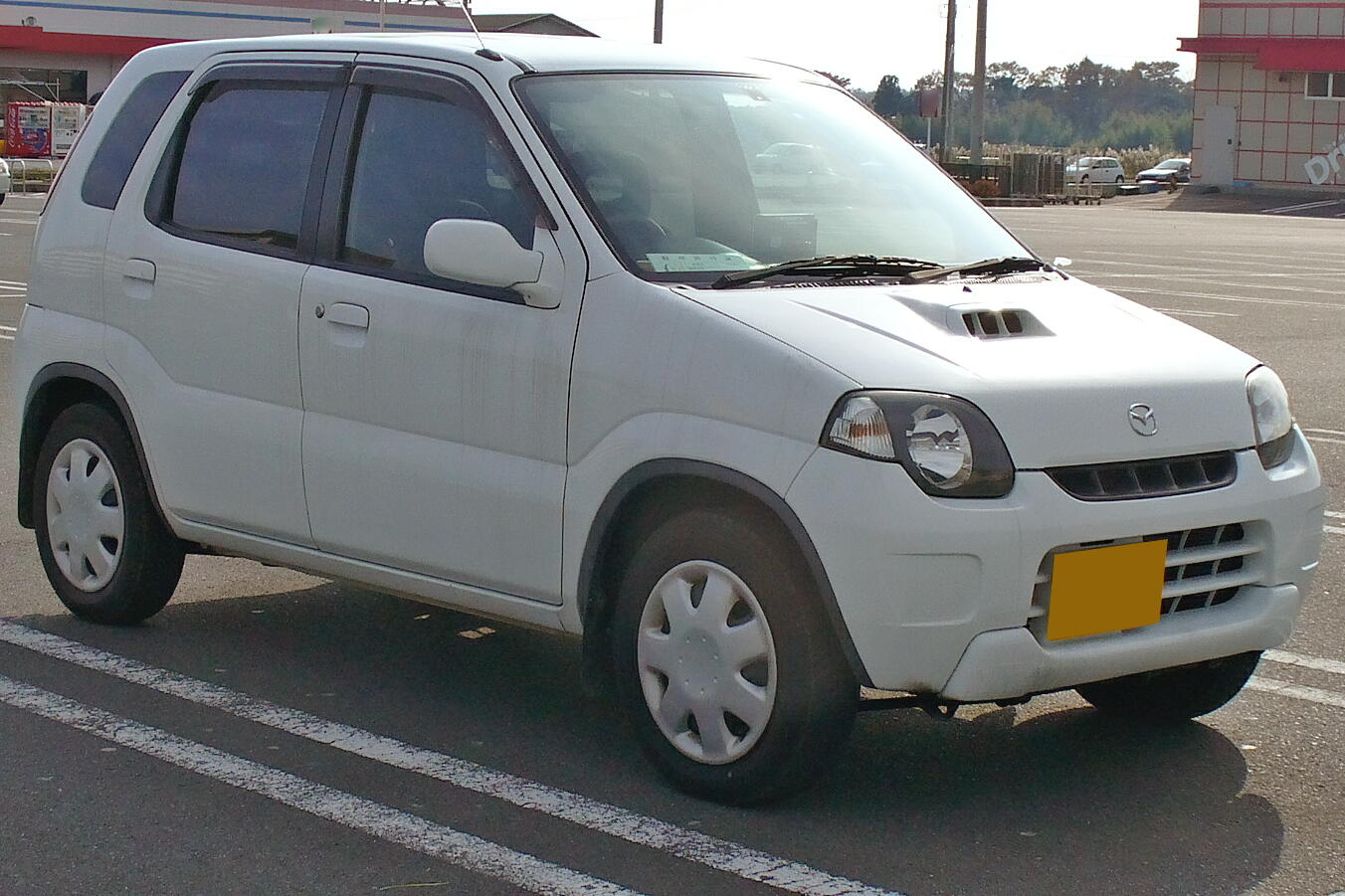
1999–2000 Mazda Laputa

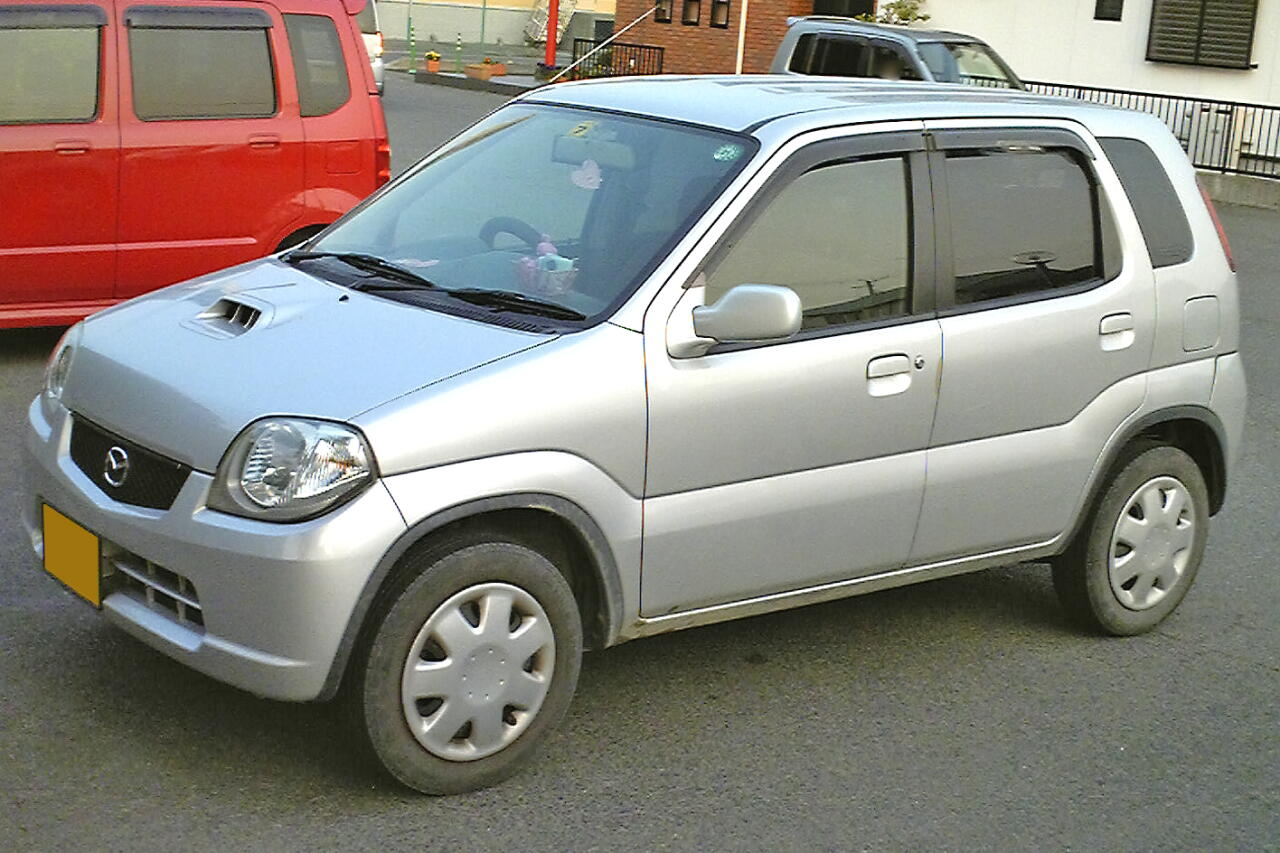
2000–2006 Mazda Laputa
