= Mini Pato =

Type of police vehicle in Japan

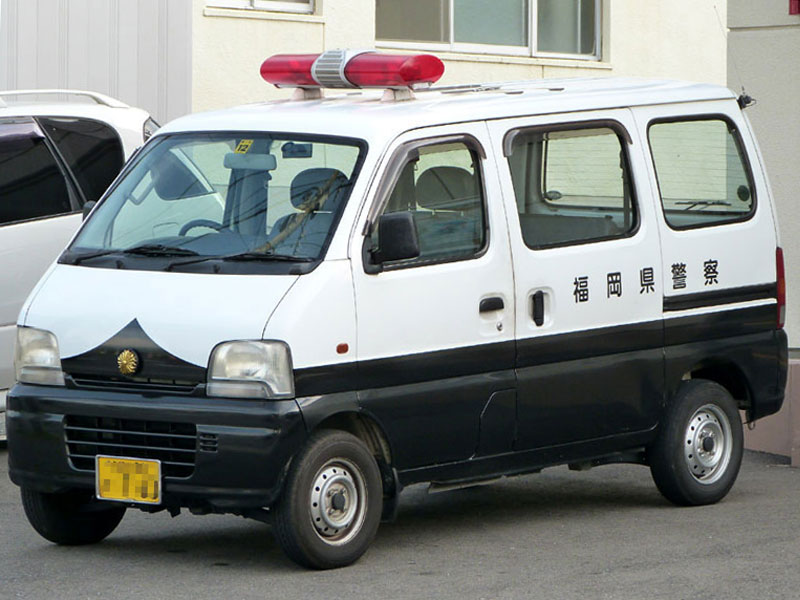
Fukuoka Prefectural Police Suzuki Every

Mini Patrol or "minipato" (ミニパト) cars, are Police vehicles in Japan named for being vehicles within the kei or "5-number" (roughly compact-sized) size classes of cars, with a maximum engine displacement of 1,500 cc or less and a maximum total length of 4,500 mm (180 in). There are exceptions such as the Suzuki SX4 and Suzuki Baleno, both "3-number"-sized cars with a total width exceeding 1,700 mm (67 in).

Mini-patos come in marked and unmarked variants, and are often deployed at kōban or police stations relatively far from the main station, or used exclusively for parking and traffic enforcement. The former, called "compact patrol vehicles", were deployed for the first time in 1974 to 100 police stations with severe road and weather conditions nationwide (Shōwa 50 edition "White Paper on Police"). A large number of 1,000-1,500 cc compact cars were introduced by the National Police Agency and deployed nationwide, and are now a common sight on the streets of Japan.

As mini-patos are not equipped with radios or radar systems, police officers riding in them are required to carry portable radios or radio receivers. However, antennas are installed in many mini-patos, and are meant to be connected to an officer's portable radio. Some vehicles are equipped with data communication terminals and location tracking systems. The equipment present on the base car is left as it is, so factory-equipped navigation systems may be present, but are seldom used due to the operational environment. In addition to the standard V-shaped light bar found on standard police cars, mini-patos are also equipped with an auxiliary red warning light.

On occasion, prefectural vehicle procurements may differ from those at the national level. Whereas national mini-pato orders are often for kei cars due to their maneuverability on cramped and congested urban roads (particularly in Tokyo), prefectural police in less urbanized areas may opt for so-called liter cars, taking durability into account because of larger operation areas and thus longer travel distances. Since most orders are from prefectural governments, there is no single standardized model nationwide.

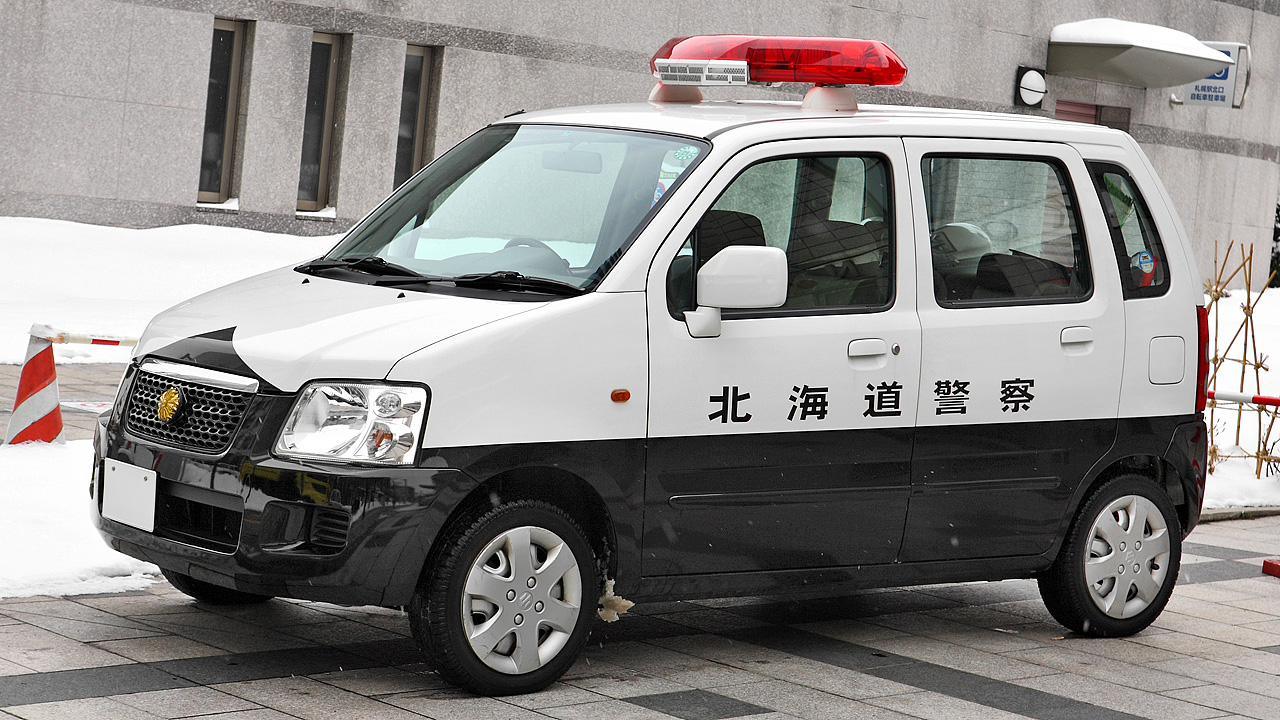
Hokkaido Prefectural Police Suzuki Solio

== Examples of nationally-funded mini-patos ==
- Toyota Passo (2007–2009, 2012)
- Toyota Platz (2001, 2004)
- Honda Insight (2009)
- Suzuki Swift (2000, 2002–2003, 2005, 2015, 2018–2020)
- Suzuki Solio (2006–2007, 2009, 2011, 2013–2014, 2017)
- Nissan Note (2022)

== Examples of prefecture-funded mini-patos ==
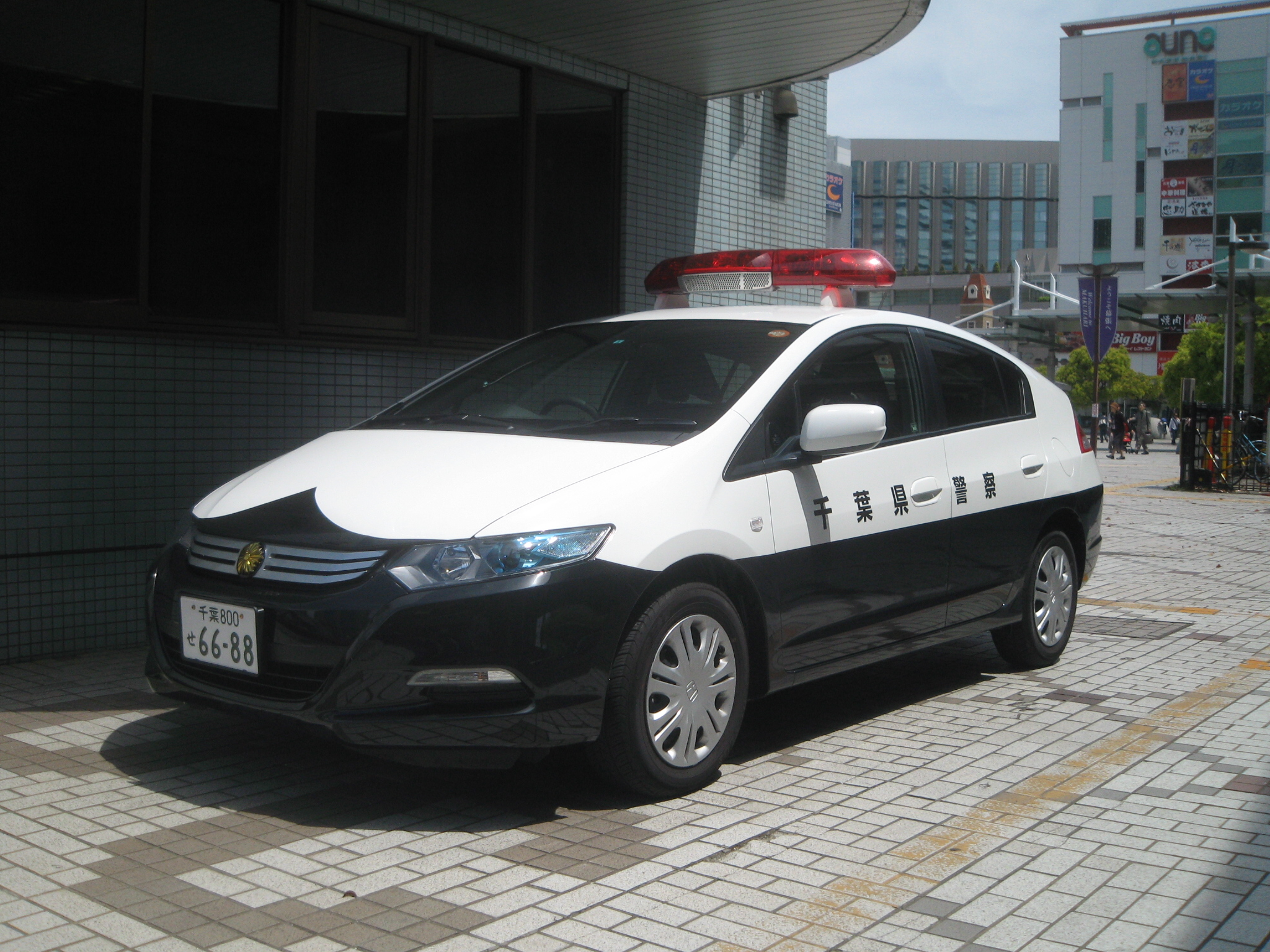
Chiba Prefectural Police Honda Insight

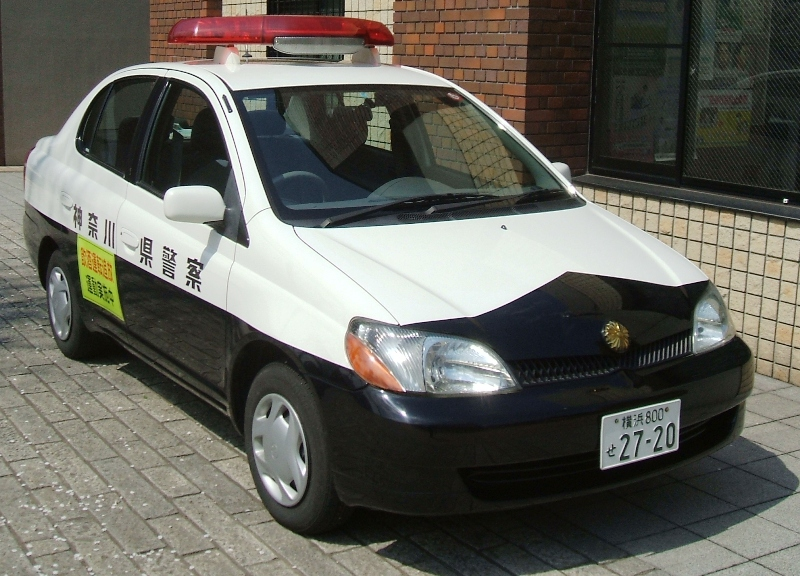
Kanagawa Prefectural Police Toyota Platz

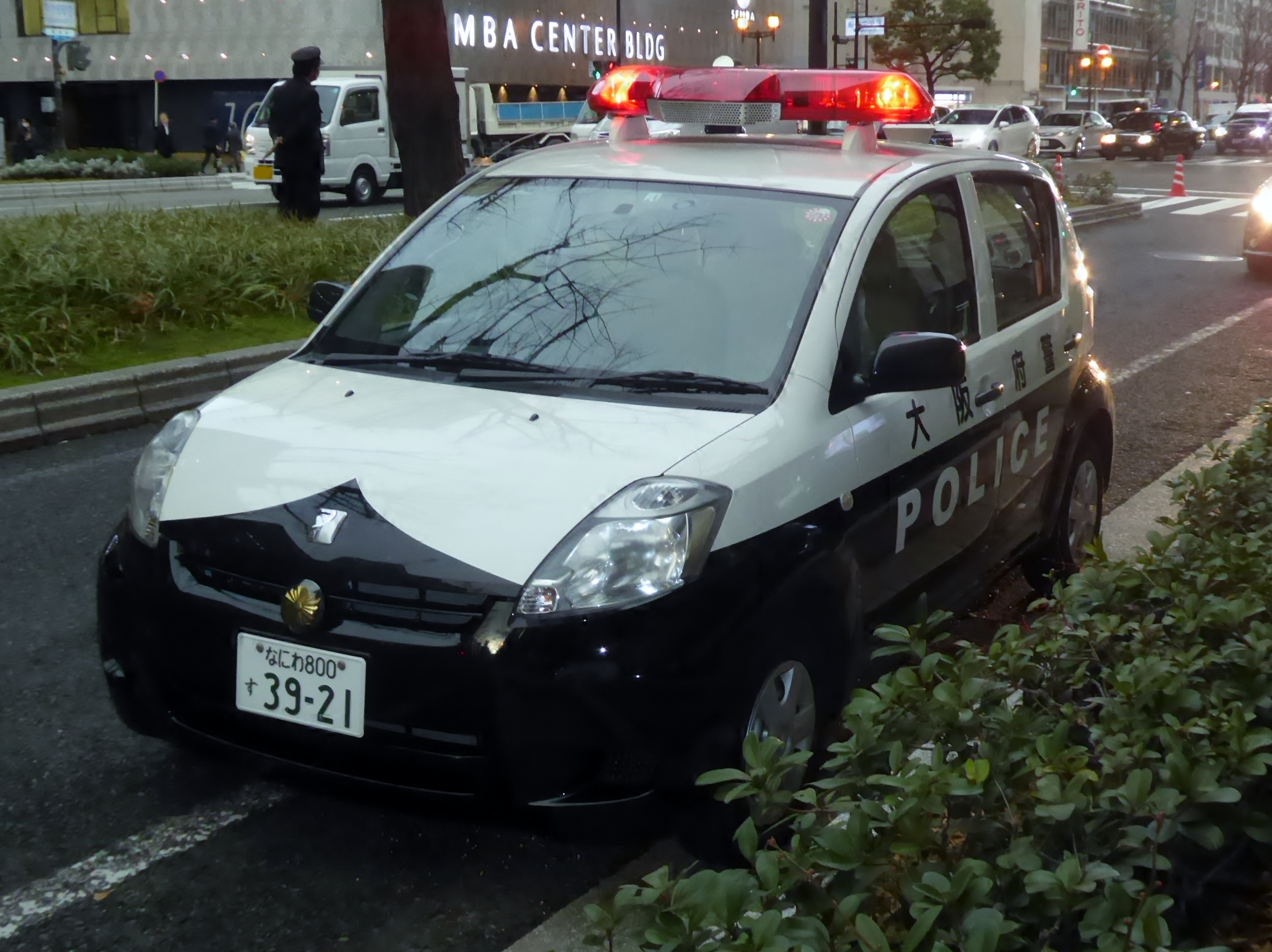
Osaka Prefectural Police Toyota Passo

- Daihatsu Atrai 7
- Daihatsu Be-go
- Daihatsu Boon
- Daihatsu Rush
- Daihatsu Charade Social
- Daihatsu Storia
- Daihatsu Terios (J100/F500) / Toyota Cami
- Daihatsu Terios Kid (kei car)
- Daihatsu Thor / Toyota Roomy / Toyota Tank / Subaru Justy (2nd-gen)
- Honda Vezel
- Nissan Cube
- Nissan March
- Nissan Note
- Nissan Pulsar Sedan (N14/N15)
- Nissan Sunny (FB15)
- Nissan Tiida Latio
- Mazda Demio
- Mazda Familia Sedan
- Mitsubishi Colt
- Mitsubishi Lancer sedan (excluding Sedia)
- Mitsubishi Toppo BJ (kei car)
- Suzuki Kei (kei car)
- Subaru Impreza (GD) sedan (1.5L model only)
- Subaru Pleo (RA1/RA2/RV1/RV2)
- Suzuki Aerio hatchback / sedan
- Suzuki Baleno (3-number car)
- Suzuki Cultus Crescent
- Suzuki Hustler (3-number car)
- Suzuki Ignis
- Suzuki Jimny Sierra/Jimny Wide
- Suzuki SX4 hatchback / sedan (3-number car)
- Suzuki Xbee
- Toyota Belta (NCP96)
- Toyota Corolla Axio (NZE164)
- Toyota FunCargo
- Toyota Ist
- Toyota Starlet
- Toyota Vitz (KSP90/NCP95)
- Mazda Demio
- Mazda Axela (BK) sedan (3-number car; 1.5L model only)

== Common urban mini-patos ==
- Daihatsu Mira (including Mira Gino, Mira e:S, Mira Tocot)
- Daihatsu Esse
- Daihatsu Cast Style
- Mitsubishi Minica
- Suzuki Alto (including Alto Lapin)
- Suzuki Every

== In popular culture ==
A short film compilation from the Mobile Police Patlabor franchise is named Minipato (ミニパト) due to its super deformed (chibi) drawing style. The series has been adapted into video games and licensed products from OST to toys.
