= Police vehicles in Japan =

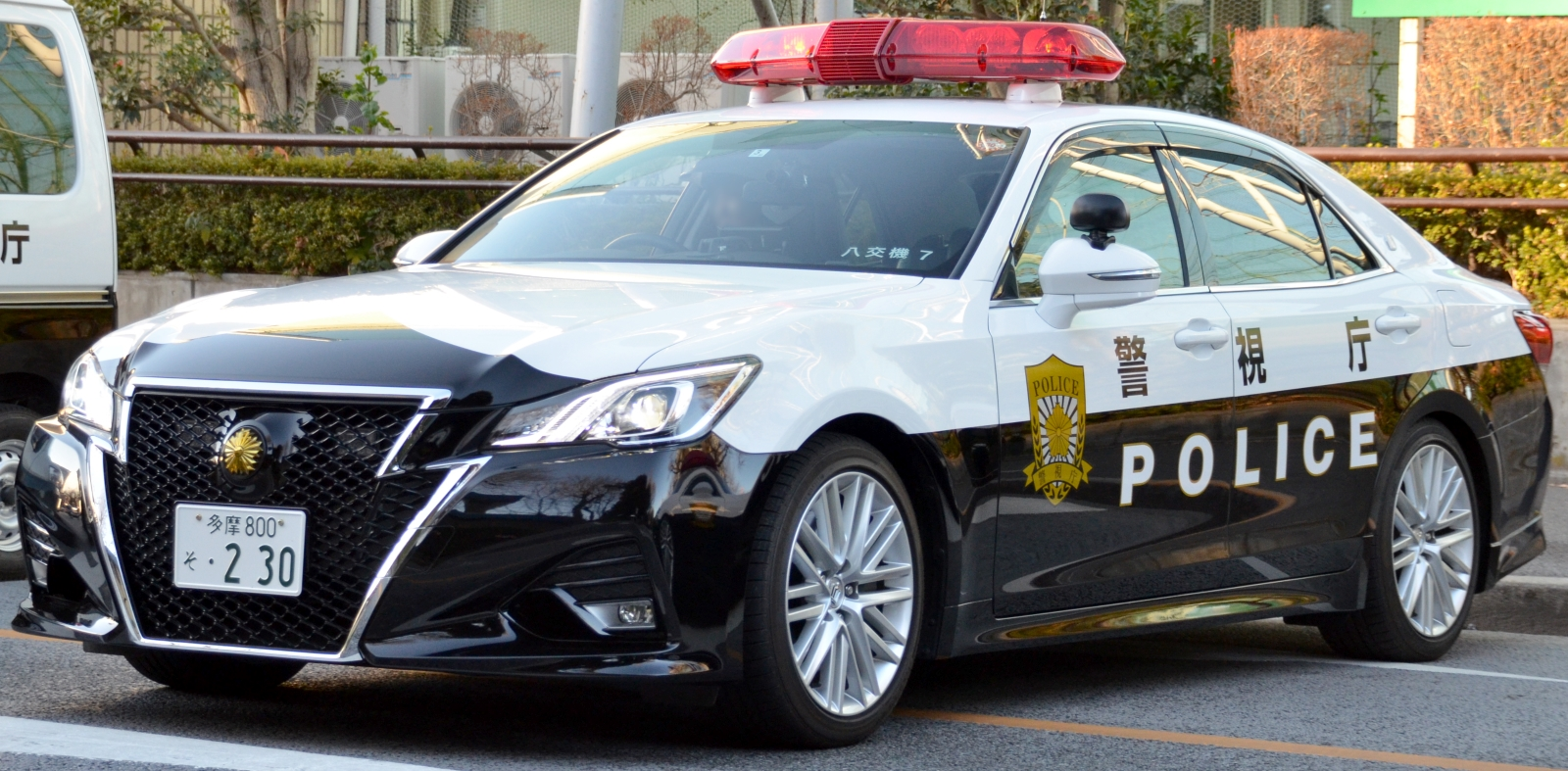
TMPD Traffic Unit 6, a fourteenth generation Toyota Crown

Police vehicles in Japan are vehicles used by Japanese prefectural police for patrolling, consisting of a variety of vehicles depending on the environment and situation. Most police vehicles in Japan are manufactured by domestic automakers such as Toyota, Nissan, or Subaru.

The formal Japanese term for a police vehicle is keirasha (警邏車), but the term patokā (パトカー), an abbreviation of "patrol car", is also widely used. The acronym "PC" is commonly used in police terminology (including over the radio).

== Overview ==
Unlike how some departments in the U.S. and Canada allow their officers to take home their police vehicles, Japan does not allow officers to take home any kind of law enforcement vehicle. Every marked police car uses a black-and-white two tone livery, and police motorcycles are usually all white. Riot police vehicles are painted blue and white, and TMPD rescue vehicles are painted green and white.

Unlike fire trucks and ambulances, patrol cars often seen in the city are operated as mobile regional police units. They actively patrol the city to detect and prevent crimes and accidents rather than waiting at police stations, and are prepared to quickly arrive on scene whenever an emergency call is made. In addition, both traffic police and criminal police units do not only carry out police operations and investigations in the city, but also serve an operational purpose to quickly reach a scene from within the city.

== History ==
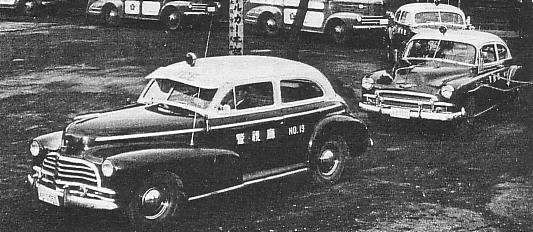
Osaka Metropolitan Municipal Police cars, c. 1950–1955. This photograph predates the prefectural police system.

The beginning of police cars in Japan is said to be at the Asakusa police station in January 1949 (Shōwa 24). Following post-WWII turmoil, security in Japan was poor, with many robberies and thefts. Therefore, the local municipal police at the time painted a US military-sourced car as a trial "mobile police" (移動警察, idō keisatsu) vehicle.

In June 1950 (Shōwa 25), the Tokyo Metropolitan Police Department deployed three so-called patrol cars, which were modified sedan-bodied WWII-era Nissan 180 truck chassis with radios. As the Korean War broke out at around the same time, the Japanese Red Purge became popular under the MacArthur Directive, and the role of the municipal police increased.

These first three police cars were of poor quality with a harsh ride, and broke down frequently. As a result, subsequent police cars were based on Ford and Chevrolet models sold by the US military. Due to a stated risk of radio jamming and interception, police radios were prohibited at the discretion of the Supreme Commander for the Allied Powers, so police cars often got lost. VHF radios were finally allowed from the late 1950s.

In the 1960s, when the quality of domestic cars began to rise, police cars also began to be based on new domestic models, such as the Toyota Crown-based Toyota Patrol. The Nissan Cedric and Isuzu Bellel were also adopted as base vehicles for police cars, and before long, only domestic models were used as police vehicles.

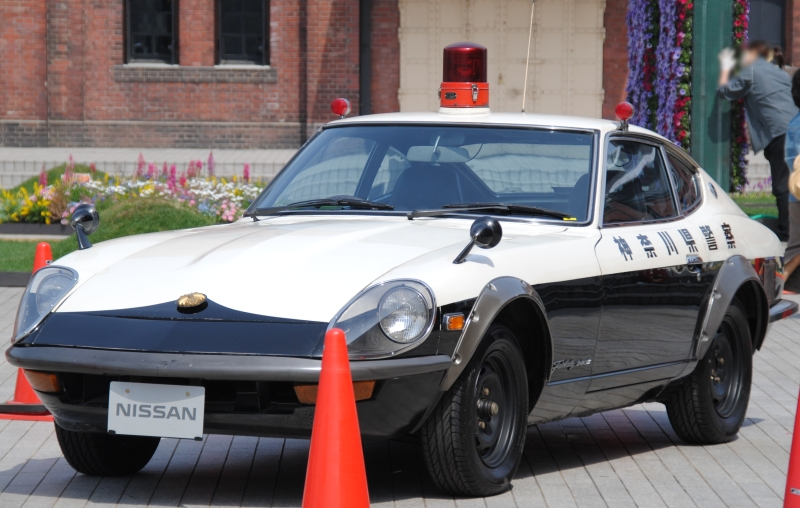
Kanagawa Prefectural Police Nissan Fairlady Z 240ZG

When the expressway system opened, sports cars were adopted as base vehicles for police cars. Cars such as the Nissan Fairlady Z and the Mazda Cosmo Sports were involved in speed control on expressways. In urban areas, where illegal parking became a problem, police kei cars, commonly known as mini-pato (ミニパト), begun to play an active role. Mini-pato base cars included the Suzuki Fronte and the Daihatsu Fellow Max, and they were mainly driven by female police officers (婦警, fukei).

From the end of the 1970s to the 1980s, foreign police cars reappeared in small quantities. The Porsche 911 and BMW 3 Series were painted in black and white as marked cars, and the Mercedes-Benz W124 was deployed as an unmarked car. The most notable and famous of these is probably the Niigata Prefectural Police's 1978 Porsche 911SC. This model, which was first deployed when the Hokuriku Expressway opened, has also been used as a PR vehicle for the prefectural police and has been in use for over 20 years, which is very unusual for a police car in Japan.

== Livery ==
The National Police Agency stipulates that "the body is to be painted in black and white, equipped with red warning lights and loudspeakers on the top (roof) and front, and the name of the prefecture is to be written on the side''.

== History ==
Shortly after WWII, some municipal police units used jeep-type vehicles painted white for transportation. However, since roads at that time were unpaved and most of the domestic vehicles then were painted white, the vehicles were heavily damaged and polluted, as well as not easily identified. As a solution, American police cars were used as a reference. The sides and front of the body, which easily got dirty, were painted black, the roof was left white, and the hood was either painted black or white to easily be able to identify police vehicles. This led to the black-and-white two-tone police livery that is used in Japan to this day. However, the modified Nissan 180 that was first deployed used a white-and-green (some say white-and-blue) two-tone pattern, also similar to American police cars of the time. It was only in 1955 (Shōwa 30) that the black-and-white two-tone livery was made a nationwide standard. There are no detailed regulations at the national level, and each prefectural police force has slight differences in the livery and emergency lighting, among other details.

== Naming conventions ==
The Japanese-language text on the sides usually takes the form of the name of the prefecture, followed by the suffix fukei (府警), ken-kei (県警), or ken-keisatsu (県警察) (e.g. Osaka-fukei (大阪府警) and Kanagawa-ken-keisatsu (神奈川県警察)). Whether a Mincho or Gothic typeface is used also varies between prefectures. Currently, only a few departments, such as the Kagoshima Prefectural Police and the Kumamoto Prefectural Police, use a Mincho typeface. The Gifu Prefectural Police is the only department in Japan that has their department name written in white on the bottom of the front door for only expressway patrol units, replacing the "POLICE" notation. The Aomori Prefectural Police has a white swan illustration on the bottom of the front door.

Roof signage and radios for communication with police aircraft are mostly absent in traffic enforcement and kōban vehicles such as mini-patos. Unmarked police cars also lack roof signage to preserve their disguise.

In 2007, the Tokyo Metropolitan Police Department decided to implement a yellow reflective material for the "POLICE" lettering on the sides and rear bumper, to make police cars more easily recognizable to foreigners and improve visibility.

== Unit numbers ==
Many police cars have the name of their affiliated police station and a station-specific vehicle number written on the roof (so that it is visible to police aircraft), and the TMPD and some police headquarters also have this notation on the windshield. As an example, unit 1 of the TMPD's Kōjimachi Police Station will have "Kōjimachi 1" (麹町1) and "Kōji 1" (麹1) on the windshield and roof respectively. An expressway patrol car can be identified with signage such as "Kōsoku 3" (高速3; "High Speed 3") and "Soku 3" (速3). Each car is also assigned a prefecture-specific number used for radio communication, with, for example, a car identifying itself over the radio as unit 217.

== Lighting ==
Police cars are equipped with red warning lights and sirens as emergency vehicles and stipulated by the Road Traffic Act.

Normally, it is customary for marked patrol cars in charge of leading the Imperial motorcade to have one side of the lightbar changed to blue, but in recent years, the red lights have been left as they are and a detachable streamlined blue warning light became mainstream instead. In December 2008 (Heisei 20), when guarding the China-Japan-South Korea Summit Meeting held in Fukuoka Prefecture, each country's police cars were equipped with warning lights of different colors for identification purposes. South Korea used red and blue warning lights, Japan used red and blue front warning lights, and China used red and green warning lights. The Ōita Prefectural Police used to have cars equipped with American-style red and blue warning lights, but these vehicles were only used for guarding the Imperial House. In addition, some police cars used by United States Forces Japan are equipped with red and blue lights.

== Digital display boards ==
Many modern Japanese police vehicles are equipped with an electronic display board mounted on the rear of the vehicle. These boards allow officers to communicate easily with drivers, displaying messages such as "Follow Me" (従ってください) and speed reduction warnings. To accommodate foreign drivers, many displays alternate between Japanese and English text.

== Engines ==
Police cars differ in displacement and output depending on the type and purpose. Standard police cars generally have 1.5–1.9 L (91.5–115.9 cu in) engines, mini-pato cars have 0.66–1.5 L (40.3–91.5 cu in) engines, and expressway patrol cars have 2.0–3.0 L (122.0–183.1 cu in) engines. For this reason, vehicles are largely restricted to their initial departments, (Note: In some areas, cars have been modified into unmarked traffic enforcement cars (e.g. a Y31 Nissan Cima of the Shizuoka Prefectural Police expressway patrol department).) so new orders are placed for dedicated vehicles for each purpose. However, there are cases where sports cars are acquired by donation or ordered by the prefectural police, and among them, the Nissan Fairlady Z has a track record of all generations having been made into police cars.

== Radio antennas ==
As a distinctive freature on the exterior, there are one or multiple antennas for the police radio system. These antennas are usually disguised; early on, the "F-1" antenna that imitated a personal radio antenna was used, and in the 1990s, the "TL" antenna that imitated a car phone antenna became mainstream. This was in turn followed by the "TA" antenna that is disguised as the diversity antenna of an in-car analog TV since the early 2000s, the "Euro" film antennas adjusted to the frequency of police radios, and short rod-shaped antennas (manufactured by Nippon Antenna: MG-UV-TP, WH-UV-TP, etc.), which are currently the mainstream design. Each subsequent antenna type was adopted due to the disguise becoming ineffective as in-car technology evolved. However, as an exception, some prefectural police cars use antennas disguised as amateur radio whip antennas.

== Vehicle examples ==
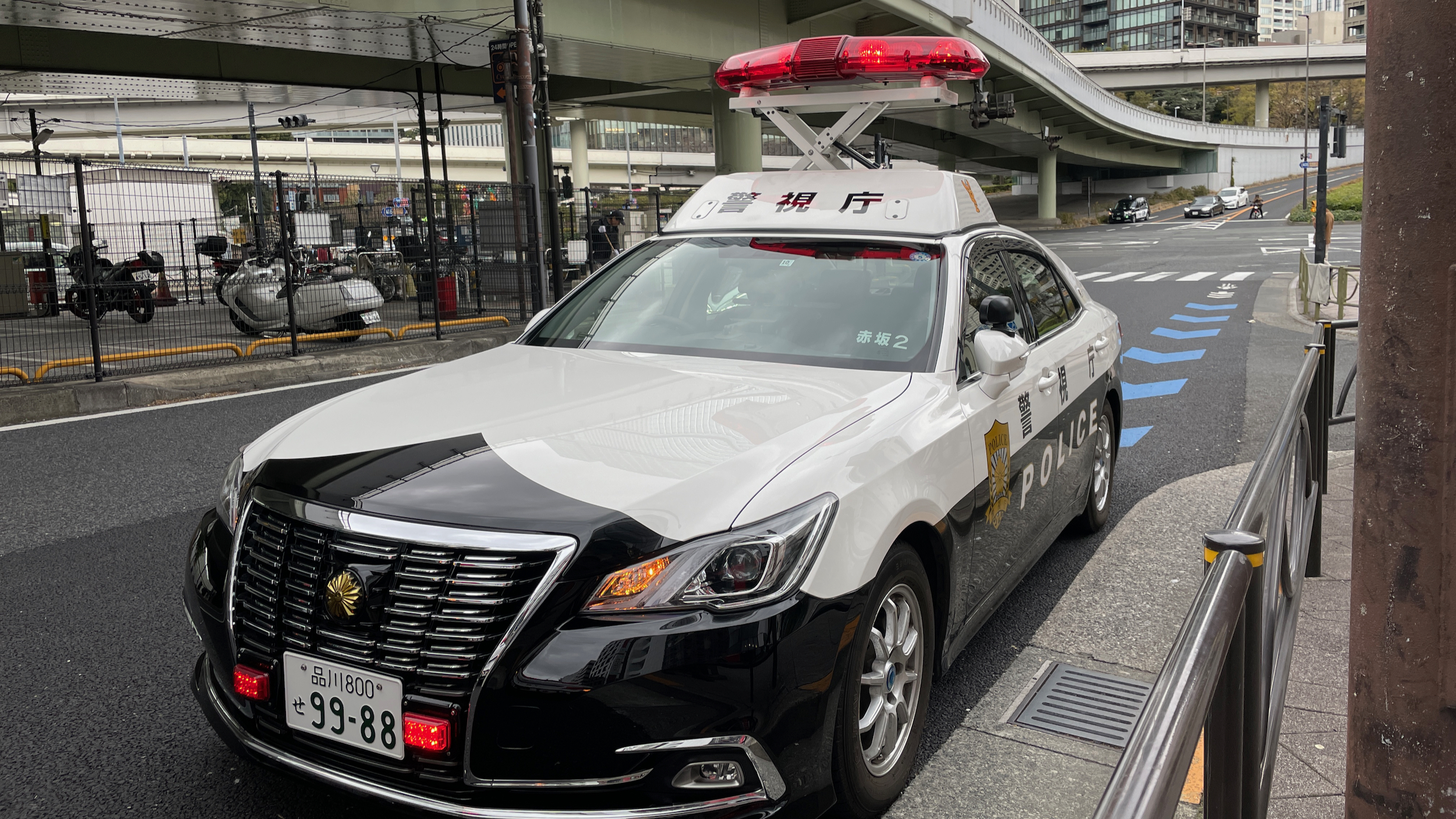
A TMPD S210 Crown Royal Salon sedan with lightbar elevated

Japanese police cars are mainly divided into marked police cars (equipped with a two-tone livery and either a red rotating lightbar fixed to the roof, or a single deployable red rotating light) and unmarked police cars (equipped with a deployable red rotating light that can be hidden or stowed away). The lightbar on many vehicles is unique in that it is mounted on a lift to elevate the light for greater visibility when stopped.

=== Standard cars ===
A standard police car is operated by one or two uniformed police officers. This is the most common and numerous patrol car in the Japanese police force, and it is mainly used in local police activities, the deterrence of collisions and traffic violations, and the investigation and crime vigilance activities of the detective department. When tailing a suspect in a criminal investigation, it is necessary to conceal the identity of the police from the suspect, so an unmarked car is used, but other police activities are carried out in an easily identifiable marked car.

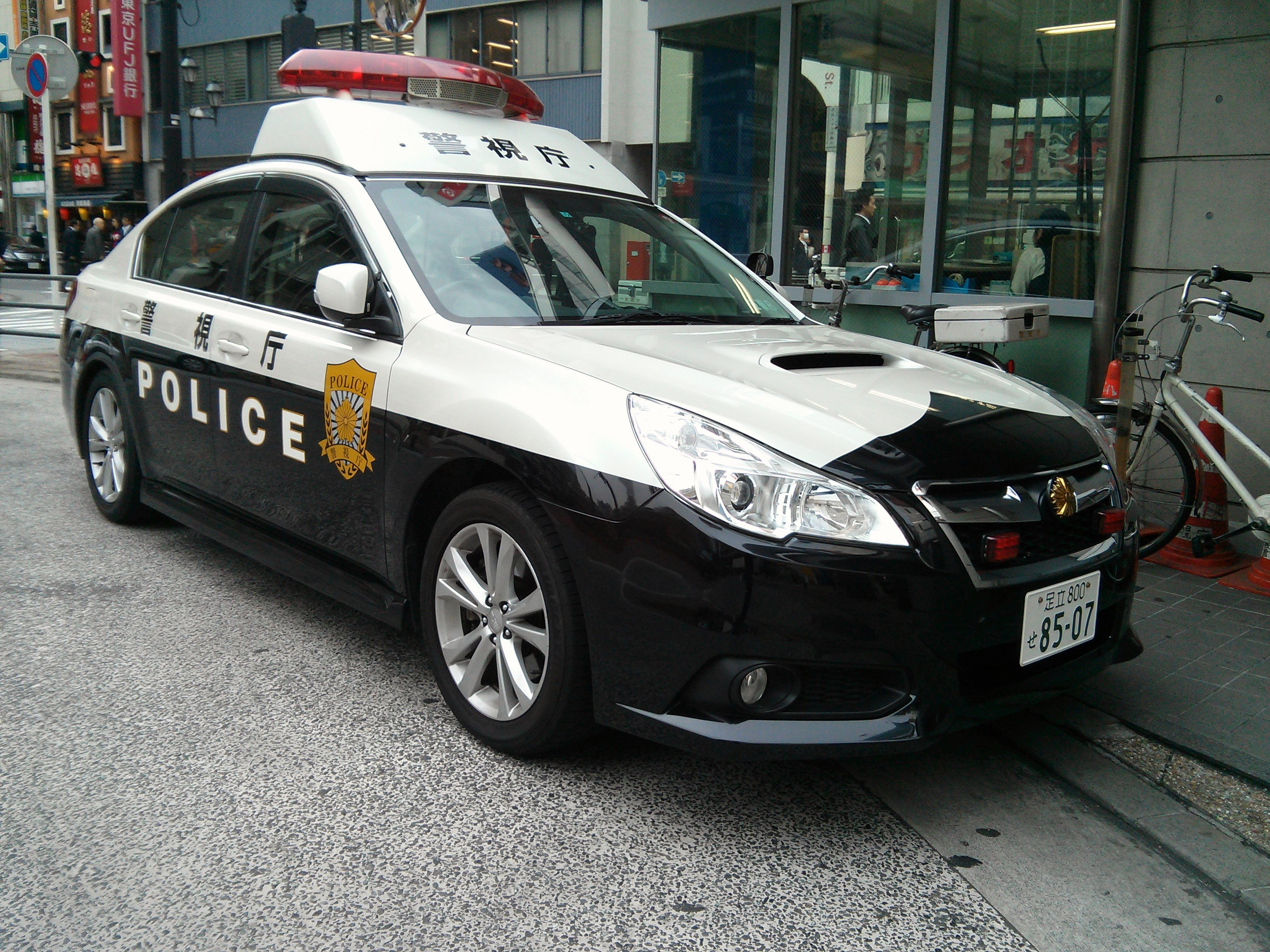
A Subaru Legacy B4 of the TMPD

Each car is assigned not to an officer, but to one of a number of departments, including mobile patrol, traffic enforcement, and expressway patrol. There are about 9,000 police cars that have been purchased with national funds and are deployed in various places nationwide, excluding unmarked cars.

As of 2022, the Toyota Crown is the most common marked police car in each prefecture, though the Yamanashi Prefectural Police uses the Toyota Mark X. The previously common Subaru Legacy is on the decline. In addition, the Saitama Prefectural Police uses the Nissan Teana as their patrol vehicle.

=== High-performance cars ===
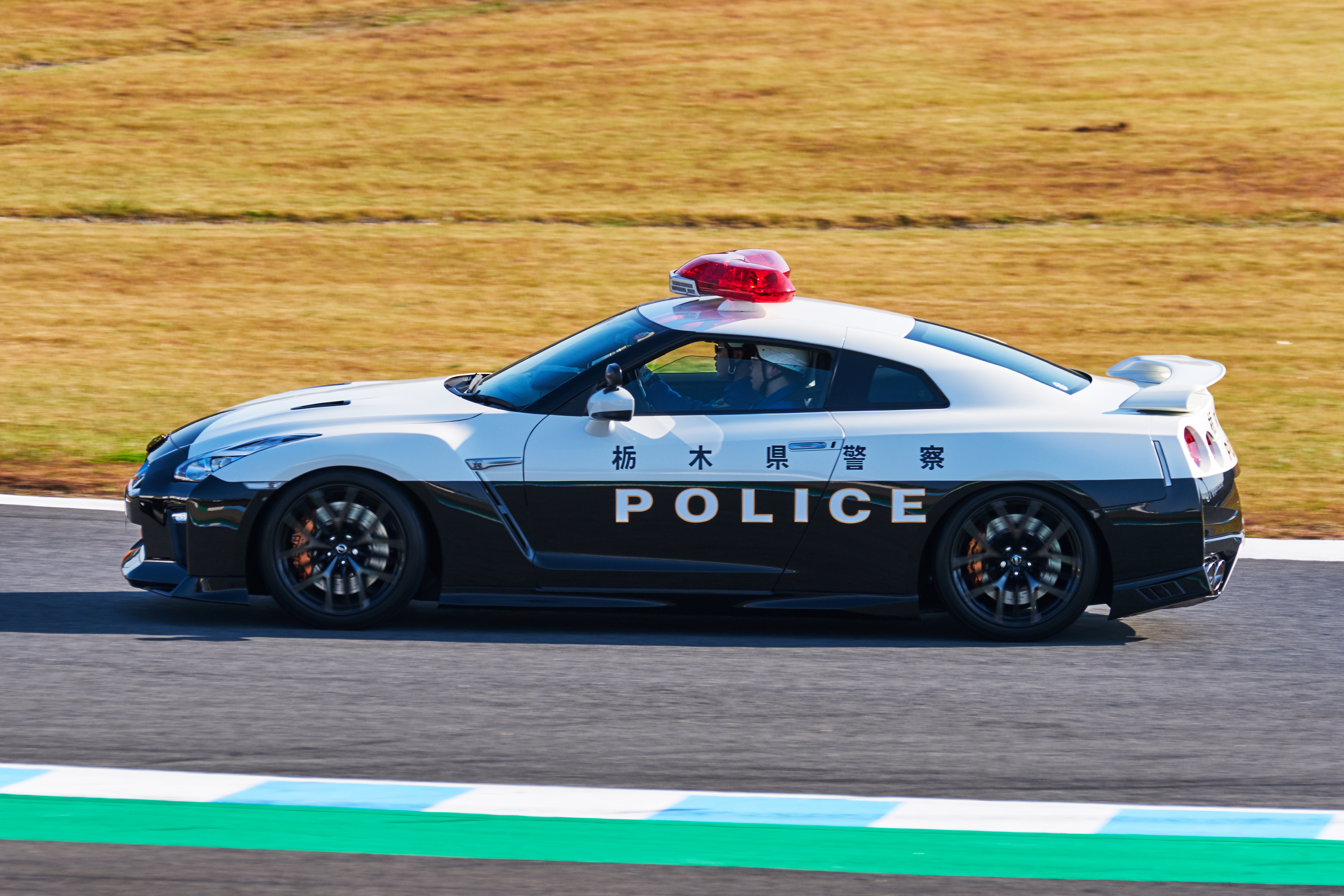
Tochigi Prefectural Police Nissan GT-R on track at Twin Ring Motegi during the 2018 Super GT Series

Some prefectural police forces have operated numerous high-performance police cars in their fleets, with a notable example being the Tochigi Prefectural Police. High-performance cars operated by these forces include the Nissan Skyline GT-R (R34), Nissan GT-R, Subaru Impreza WRX STI, Honda NSX, Nissan 370Z, and Lexus LC 500. Alongside regular use for traffic enforcement on the various expressways of Japan, these cars are often used for publicity and ceremonial purposes. On some occasions, such cars have been donated to prefectural police forces by either private owners or vehicle manufacturers.

Throughout the 1960s and 1970s, Japanese police used Ford Mustangs such as the Ford Mustang Mach 1.

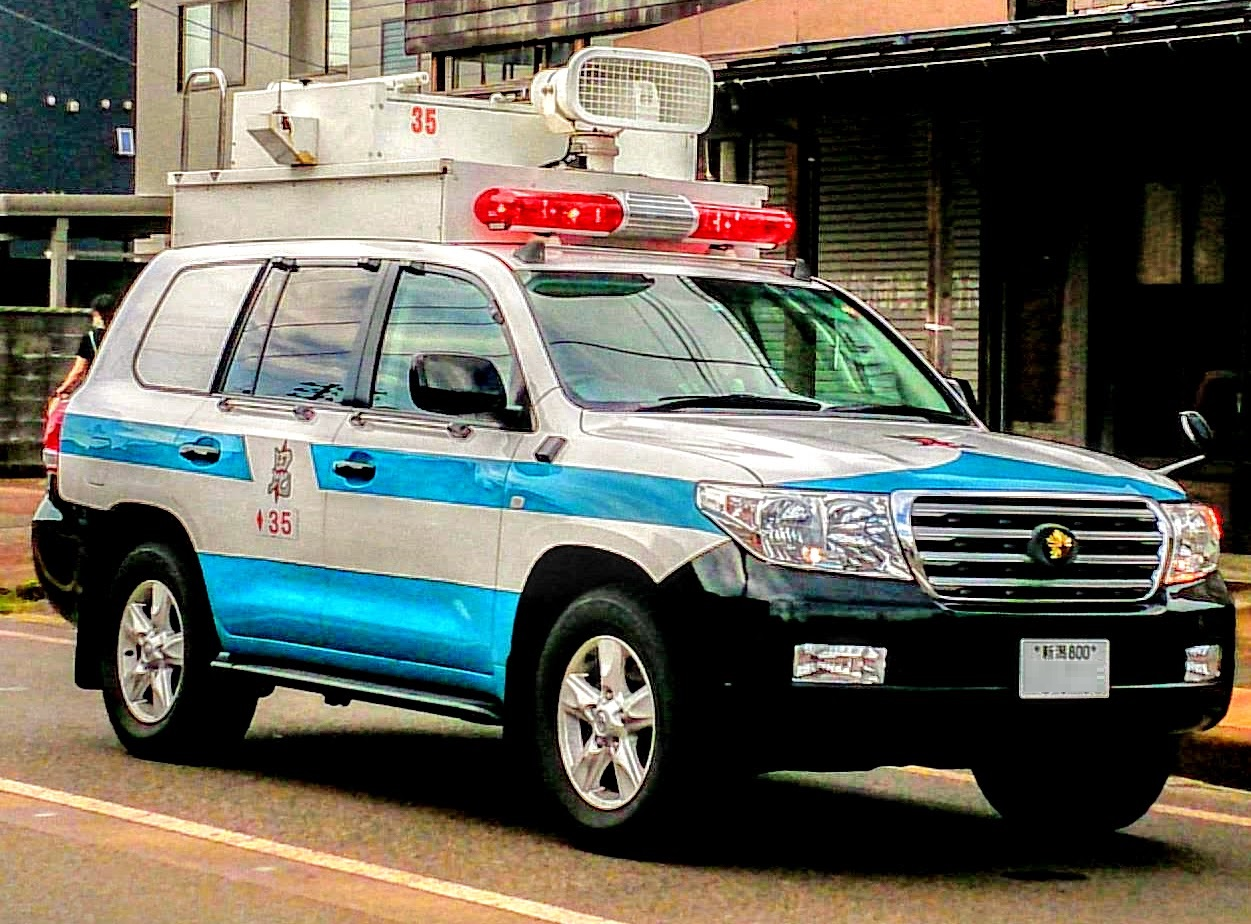
A Land Cruiser field commander's vehicle in Niigata

=== Command cars ===
Supervisors and field commanders are assigned a "genba shikikansha" (現場指揮官車) for greater visibility and use as a command center during larger operations.

Large SUVs such as the Toyota Land Cruiser and the Land Cruiser Prado are commonly used.

=== Police vans ===
A jōchūkeibisha serving as a command post at the U.S. Embassy

There are number of vans used by Japanese police in escort (護送車, gosō-sha), security (常駐警備車, jōchūkeibisha), and assault (遊撃車, yūgeki-sha) roles

Specially outfitted vans called gosō-sha such as the Nissan Caravan and Toyota HiAce, buses such as the Toyota Coaster and Nissan Civilian, as well as the Hino Melpha are used as staff cars and for prisoner transport with warning lights, bars on the inside of windows, and a barrier separating the passengers from the driver.

Armored vans (特型警備車, tokugatakeibisha) are used by the Riot Police Unit (機動隊, Kidō-tai) and security forces. These vans are based on Mitsubishi Fuso Canter and Super Great chassis and can be used to transport officers to a scene, serve as a command center, or as a mobile barricade from which officers use as cover.

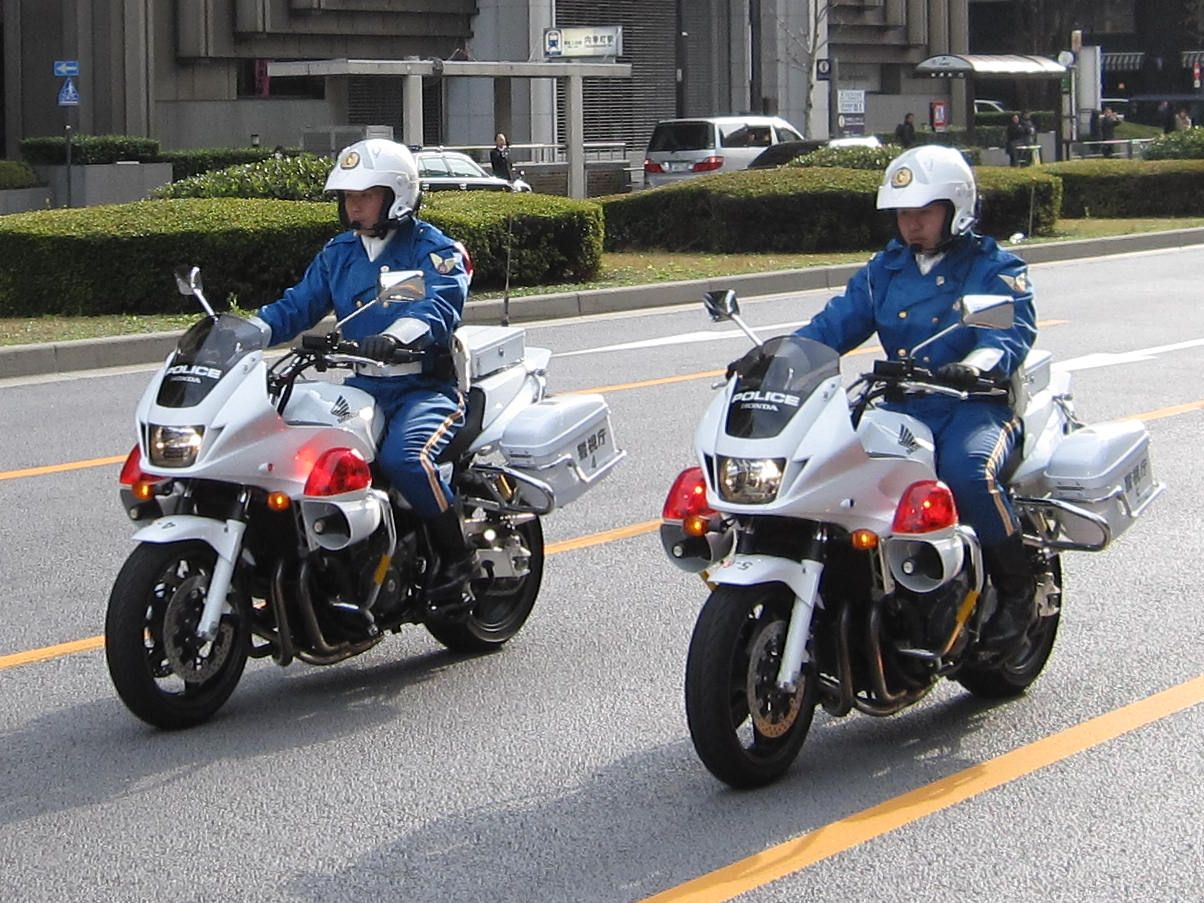
2 Japanese police Honda CB1300s

=== Police motorcycles ===
Police motorcycles are called shirobai (白バイ, "white motorcycle") due to their white livery. Motorcycles were first introduced for police use by the Tokyo Metropolitan Police Department in 1918, and Japan adopted an all-white color scheme nationally in 1936. Many early shirobai were produced by Meguro motorcycles, while the Honda CB and Honda VFR series are popular today.

=== Environmental vehicles ===
As part of sustainability initiatives, some Japanese police forces have begun incorporating eco-friendly vehicles into their fleets. The Toyota Mirai, a hydrogen fuel cell vehicle, has been deployed by select prefectural police departments as a zero-emission patrol car.

=== Mini-pato cars ===
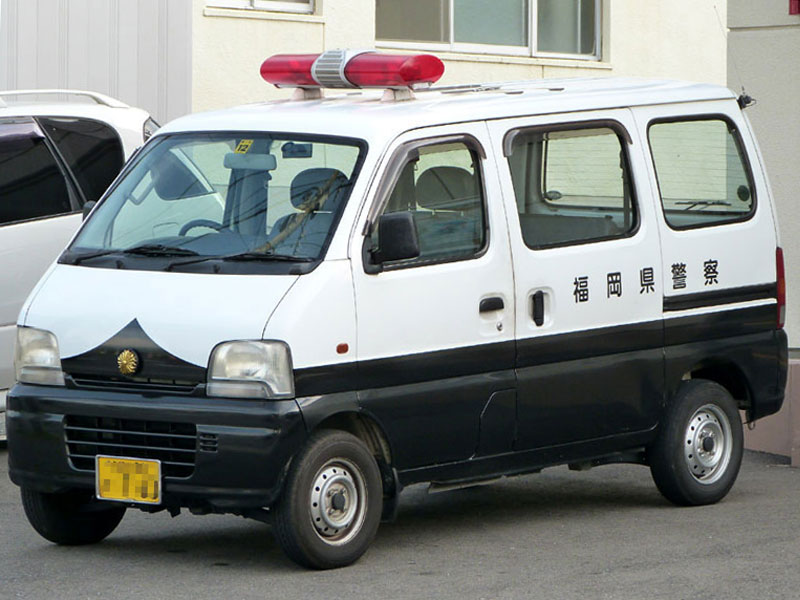
Fukuoka minipato Suzuki Every

Mini-pato (ミニパト) cars, named for being miniature patrol cars, are vehicles within the kei or "5-number" (roughly compact-sized) size classes of cars, with a maximum engine displacement of 1,500 cc or less and a maximum total length of 4,500 mm (180 in). There are exceptions such as the Suzuki SX4 and Suzuki Baleno, both "3-number"-sized cars with a total width exceeding 1,700 mm (67 in).

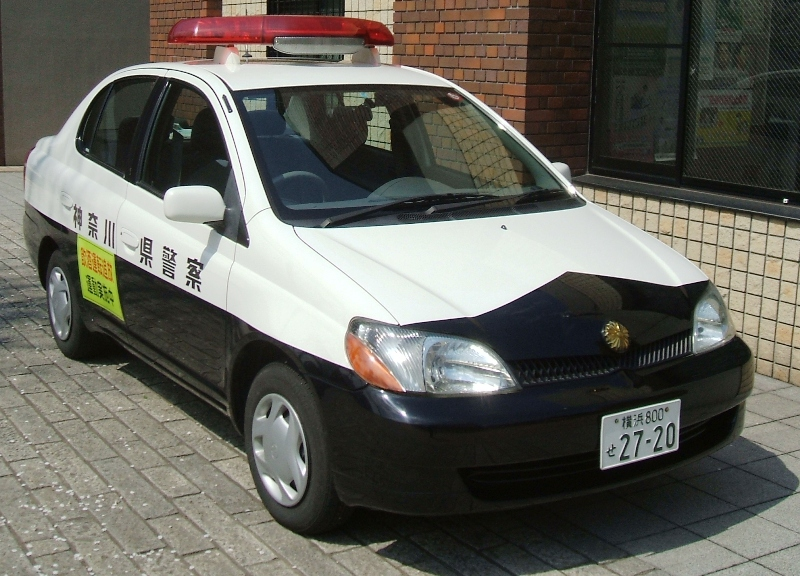
Kanagawa minipato Toyota Platz

Mini-patos come in marked and unmarked variants, and are often deployed at kōban or police stations relatively far from the main station, or used exclusively for parking and traffic enforcement. The former, called "compact patrol vehicles", were deployed for the first time in 1974 to 100 police stations with severe road and weather conditions nationwide (Shōwa 50 edition "White Paper on Police"). A large number of 1,000-1,500 cc compact cars were introduced by the National Police Agency and deployed nationwide, and are now a common sight on the streets of Japan.

=== Unmarked cars ===
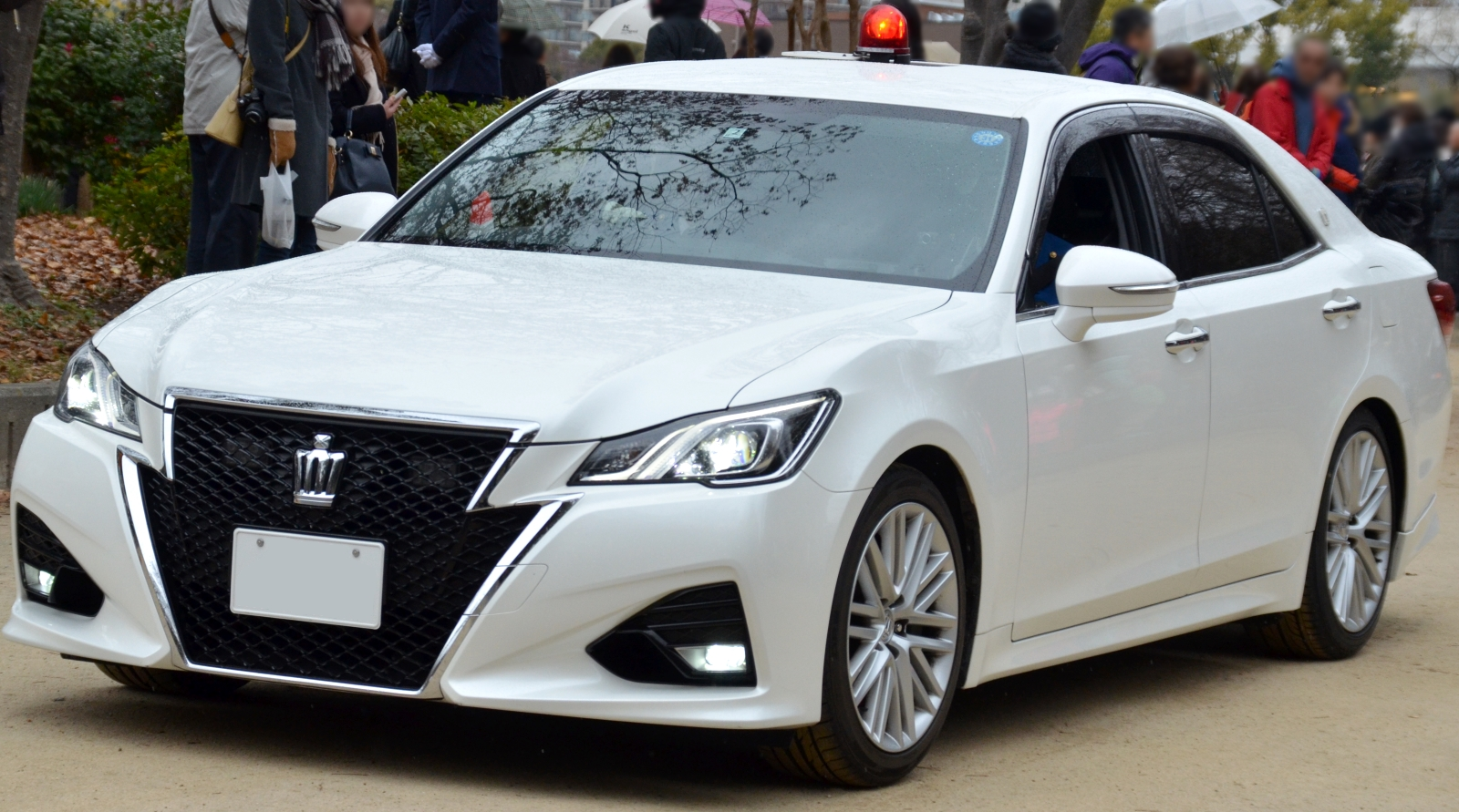
An unmarked Toyota Crown with its rotating light deployed

An unmarked police car, or fukumen-sha (覆面車; "masked/disguised car"), has the same appearance as a normal civilian car, with hidden emergency lighting being deployed in the event of an emergency. In Japan, unmarked cars are used for traffic enforcement, escorts, and criminal investigations. Unmarked cars' emergency lighting is generally in the form of a single red rotating beacon light stored under a panel in the roof of the vehicle that electrically rotates into place when needed, leaving a recess in the roof (sometimes called a "washbowl" (洗面器, senmenki) due to its shape). Early on (i.e. in the 1960s), this light only ascended and descended into position and did not rotate. Some unmarked cars use a magnetic beacon light that is manually attached to the roof of the car, and others have an electronic display board visible through the rear window that can display messages such as "FOLLOW ME" or "SLOW DOWN".

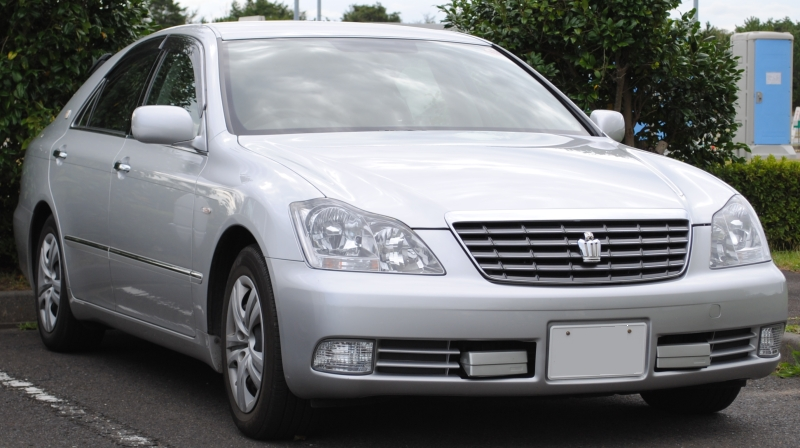
Two Nissan Caravan presenting different liveries.
A Toyota Crown with an "auto-cover" warning light in the front bumper and "TA" antennas on the left and right sides of the upper rear window

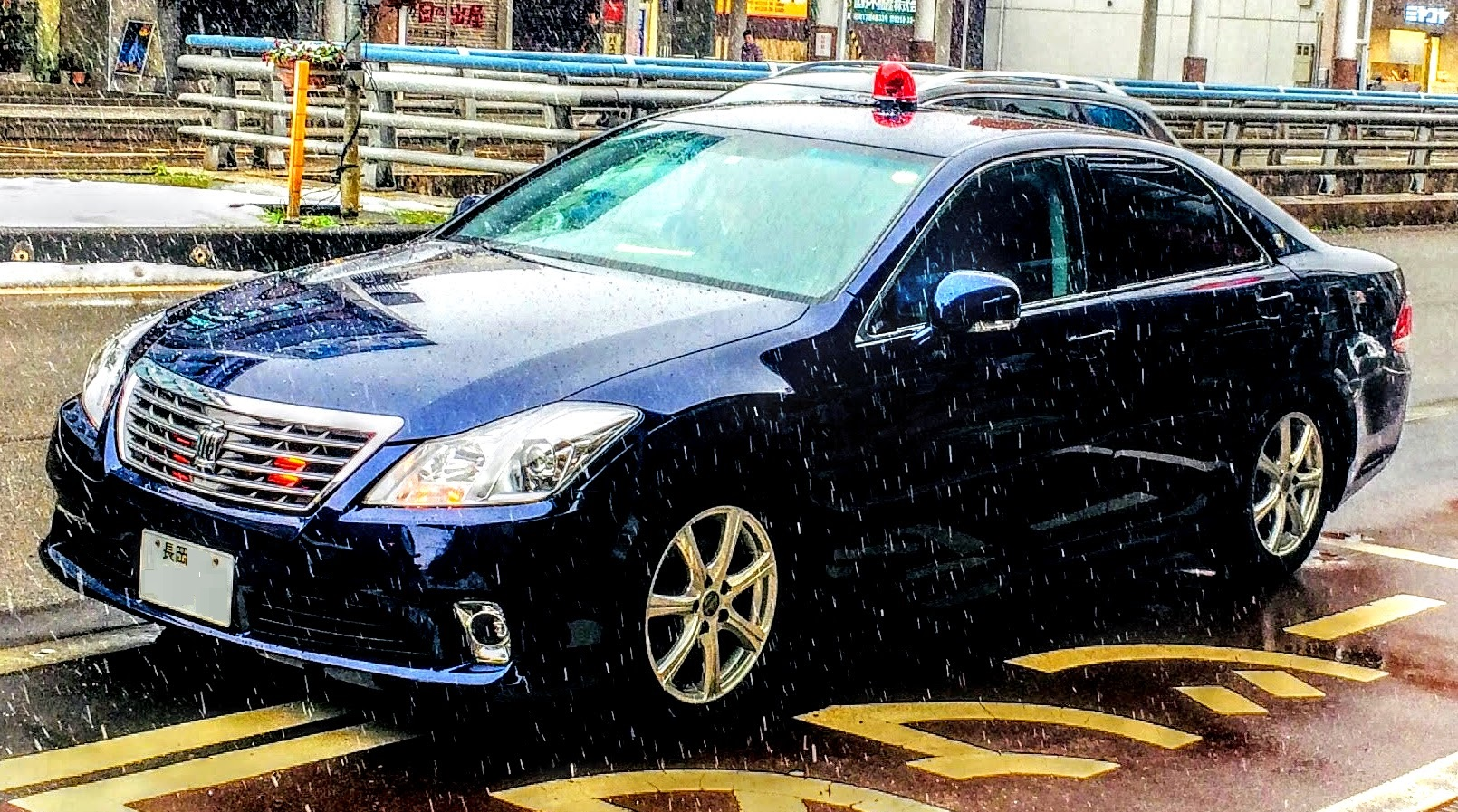
A Niigata Toyota Crow with roof light deployed and grill lights lit.

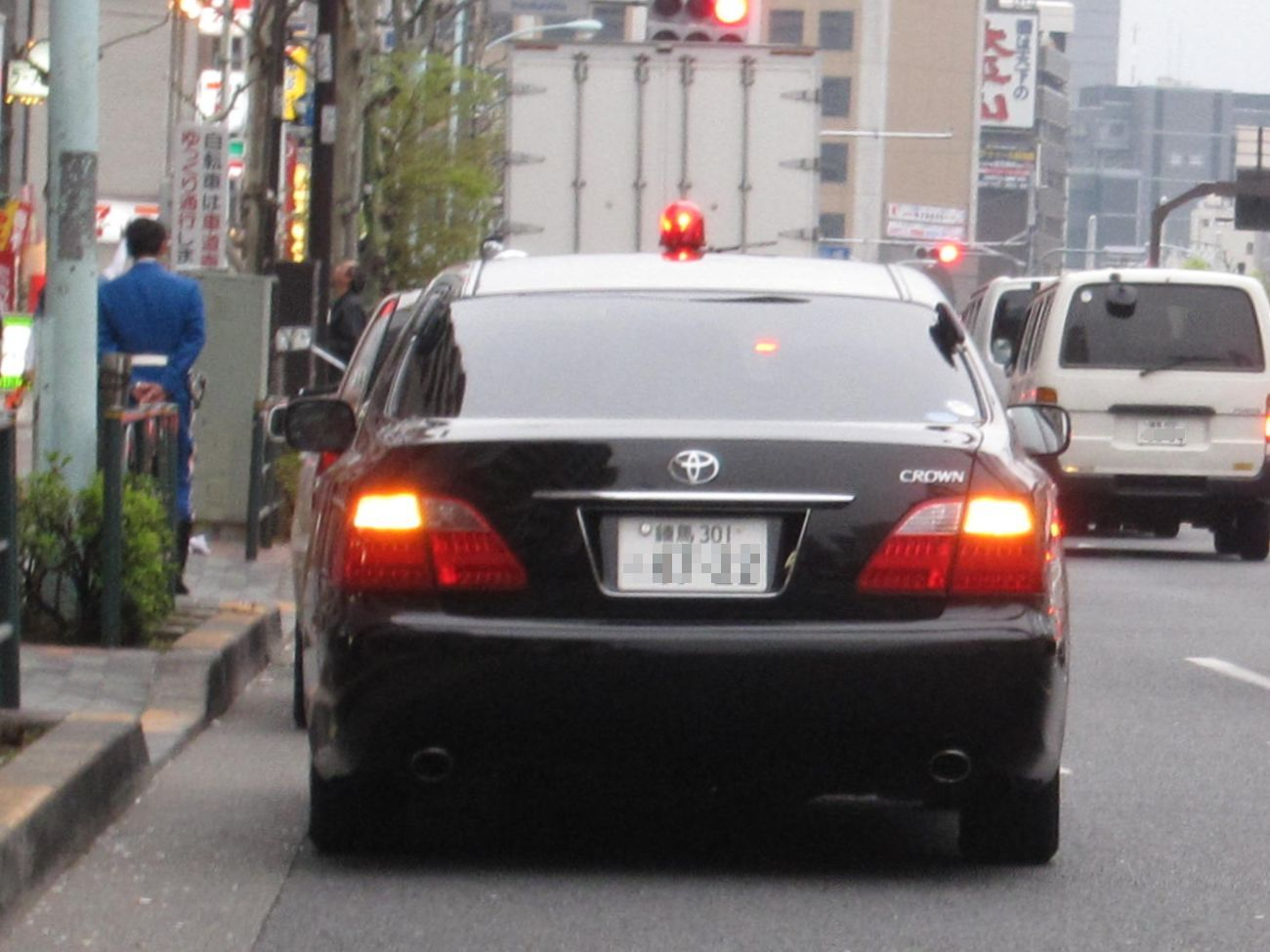
A TMPD Toyota Crown for traffic enforcement with "TA" antennas

=== Boats ===
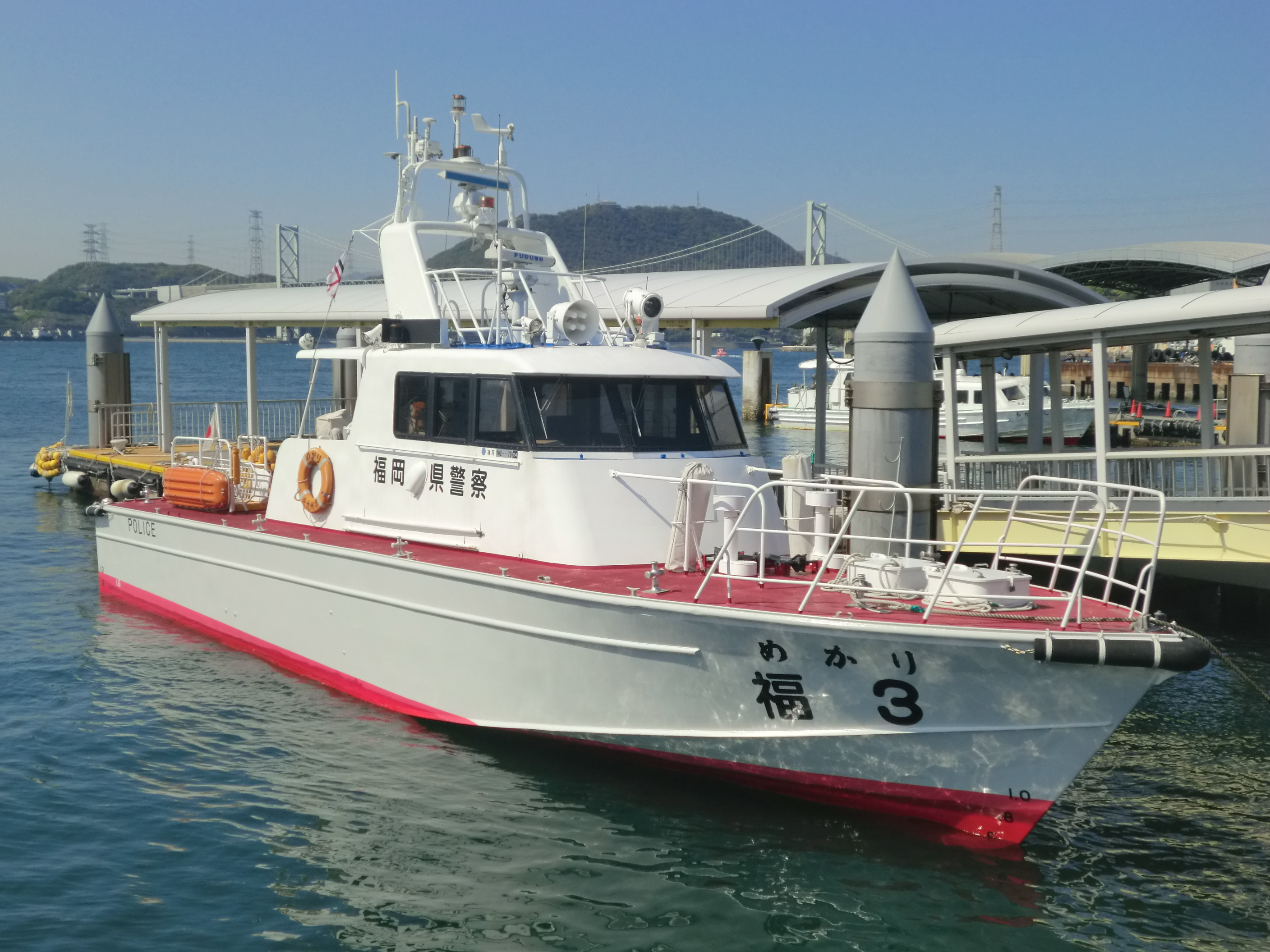
A 17 meter boat of the Fukuoka police

In the post-war era following the dissolution of the military and prior to the creation of the Japan Coast Guard, the National Police Agency (国家地方警察) was tasked with enforcing near-coastal maritime law in port areas with the acquisition of former Imperial Navy motor boats.

As an island nation, Japan's dependence on port security and increased gray-zone challenges around outlying islands taking up much of the Coast Guard's time, prefectural police continue to patrol and provide a law enforcement presence within port and inland water areas, working in conjunction with the Coast Guard's responsibility for patrolling Japan's vast exclusive economic zone.

Approximately 160 vessels are deployed nationwide, divided into five groups: 23-meter type, 20-meter type, 17-meter type, 12-meter type, 8-meter type.

=== Helicopters ===
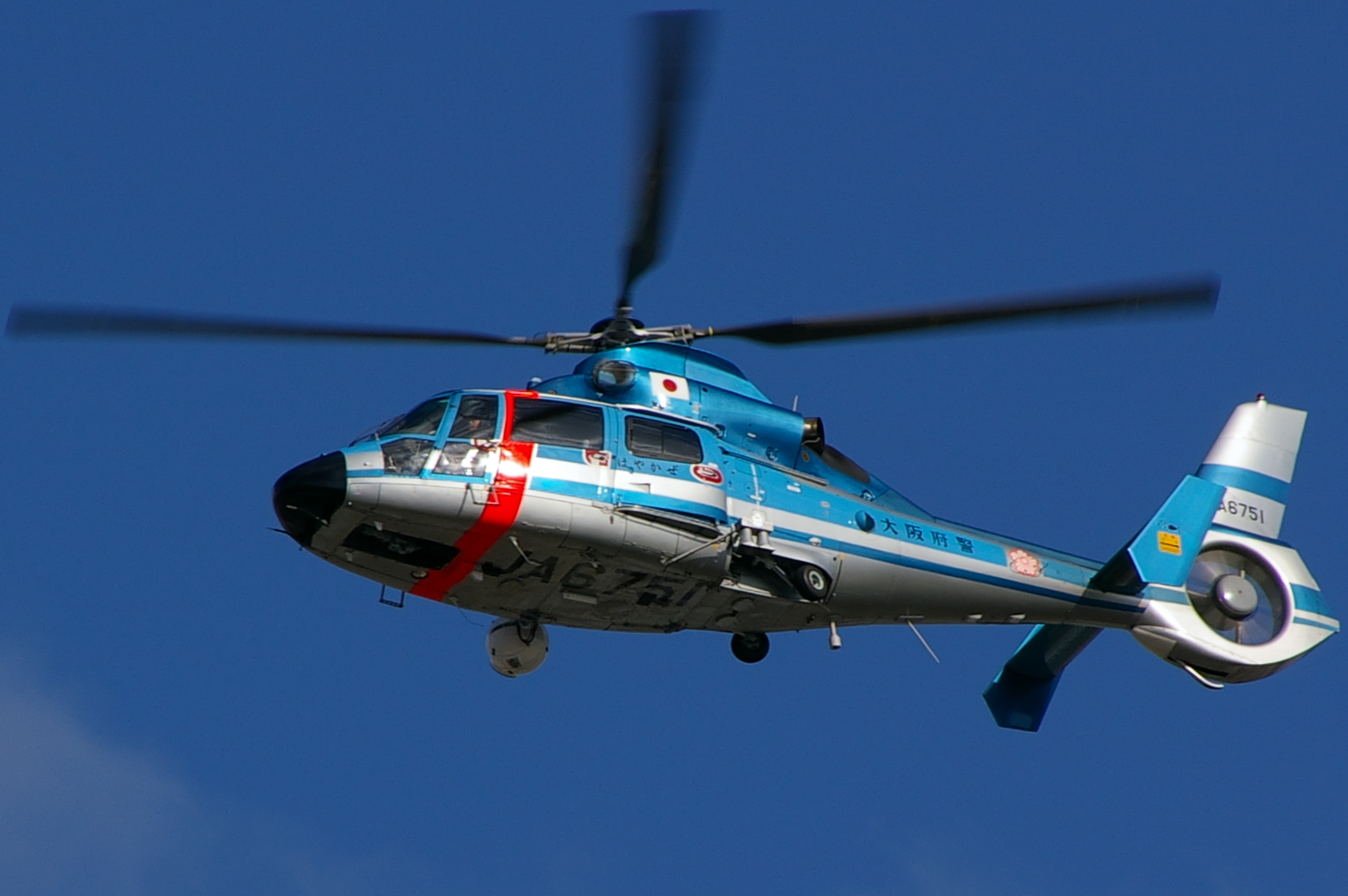
An Osaka police AS365 flies overhead

Japanese police acquired their first helicopter in 1959 with the establishment of the Prefectural Aviation Unit (都道府県警察航空隊), and the delivery of a Bell licensed Kawasaki 47G to the Tokyo Metropolitan Police Department. Harukaze 1 remained in service until 1976 and is now preserved at the Tokyo Police Museum.

Today, all 47 prefectures operate police helicopters for patrol, rescue, and to provide air support for ground units with the Airbus H135 family and AgustaWestland AW139 family the most popular models. Long a popular model with the JGSDF, the Bell Huey family as well as the Bell JetRanger family are also well represented, while the Aérospatiale Dauphin family, Airbus H215, and Sikorsky S-92 round out the fleet.

The police livery is a two-tone sky blue and silver color scheme with a black nose and an orange vertical stripe around the fuselage throughout Japan, and aircraft operations are regulated the National Public Safety Commission Regulation No. 1 of 2021 and the Police Act Enforcement Order (Cabinet Order No. 151 of 1954).
