= Automobile roof =

Upper part of an automobile

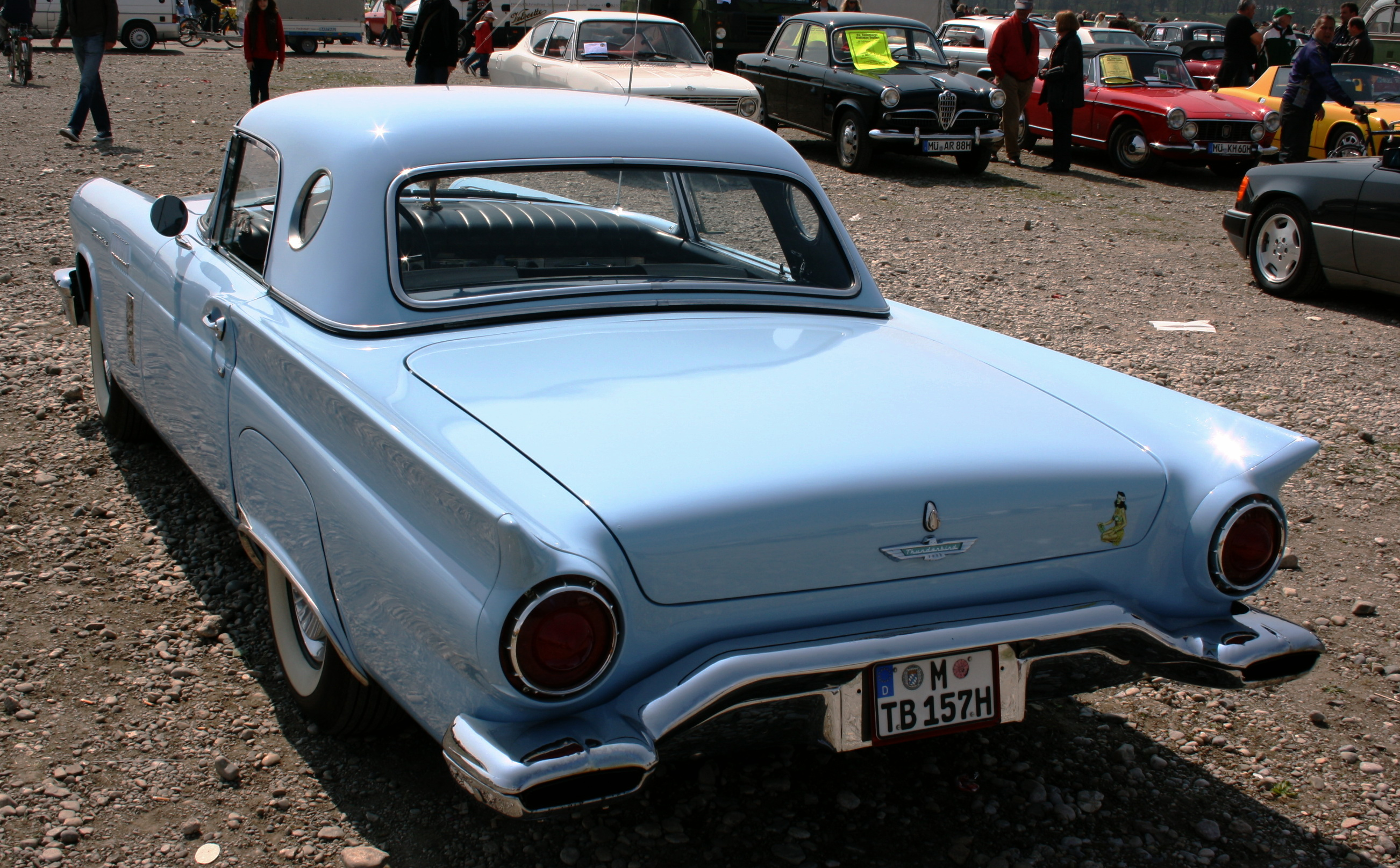
Detachable hardtop with "porthole" side windows on a 1957 Ford Thunderbird

An automobile roof or car top is the portion of an automobile that sits above the passenger compartment, protecting the vehicle occupants from sun, wind, rain, and other external elements. Because the earliest automobiles were designed in an era of horse-drawn carriages, early automobile roofs used similar materials and designs.

== Variations ==
In later years, many variations on the automobile roof developed. These include:

- Convertible roofs
  - Roof modules
- Hardtops
- Sunroofs
- T-tops
- Targa tops
- Vinyl roofs

== See also ==
- Car glass
- Roof rack
- Roof
