= Suzuki Every =

Microvan/Minivan produced by Suzuki

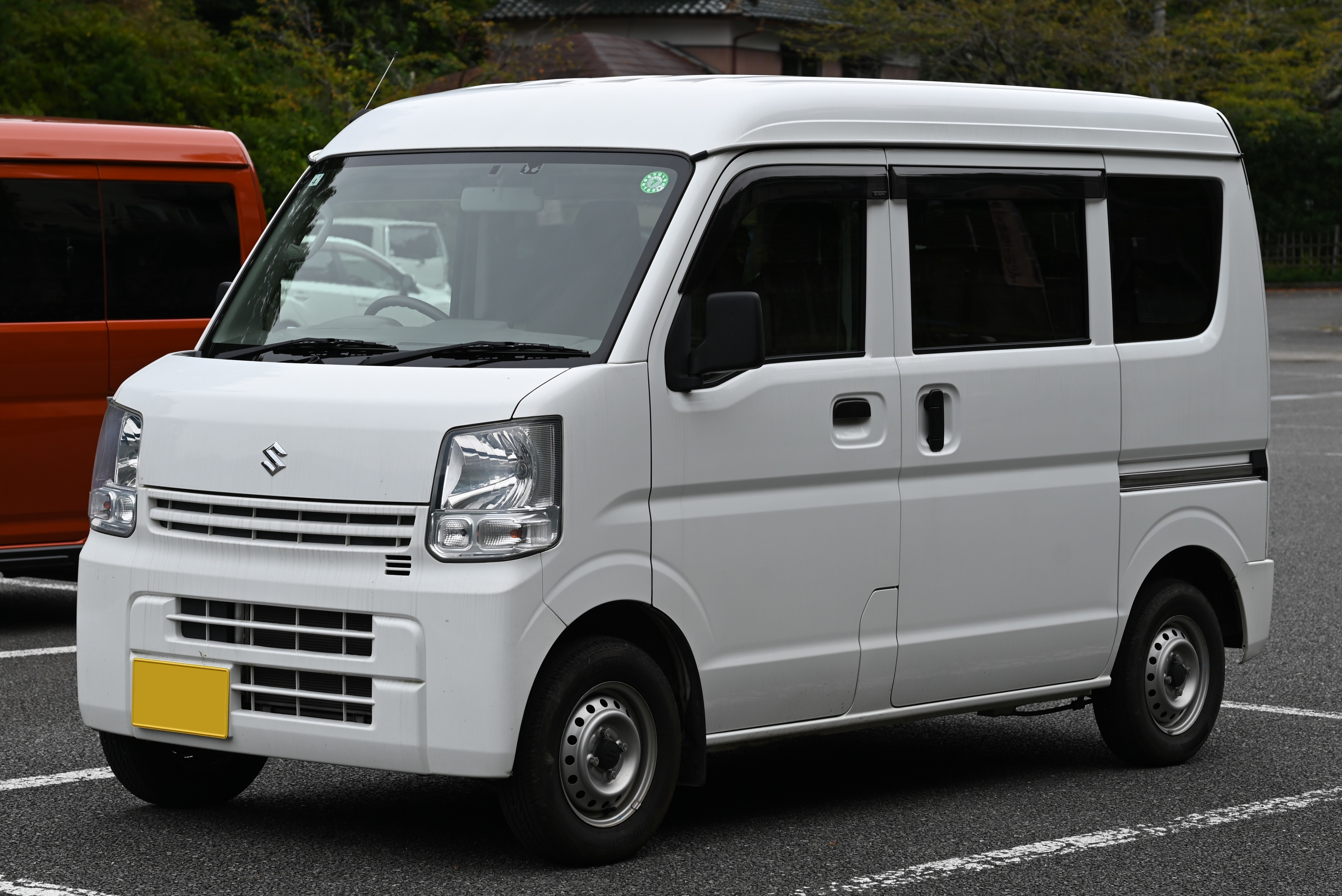
- Sixth generation Suzuki Every

Overview
- Manufacturer: Suzuki
- Production: 1982–present

Body and chassis
- Class: Microvan (Japan); Light commercial vehicle (Every Plus and outside Japan)
- Related: Suzuki Carry

The Suzuki Every (Japanese: スズキ・エブリイ, Hepburn: Suzuki Eburī), is a microvan produced by the Japanese automaker Suzuki. In Japan, the Every is kei cars but the Suzuki Every Plus, the bigger version of Every, had a longer hood for safety purposes and a larger engine; export market versions and derivatives.

Since 1999, the nameplate have been differentiated, with commercial vehicles called Every and passenger vehicles called Every Wagon. Starting from the fifth generation, the Every uses a completely different design.

According to Suzuki, the "Every" nameplate means "Anywhere".

== First generation (ST40; 1982) ==
First generation
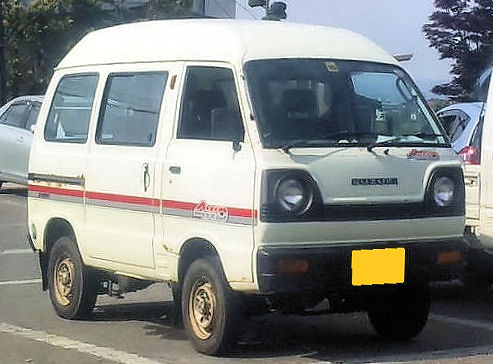
- 1981–1985 Suzuki Every (ST40)

Overview
- Also called: Suzuki Bolan (van, Pakistan); Maruti Omni (India)
- Production: 1982–1985
- Assembly: Japan: Iwata, Shizuoka

Body and chassis
- Body style: 5-door van
- Layout: Front mid-engine, rear-wheel-drive or four-wheel-drive

Powertrain
- Engine: 543 cc F5A I3
- Transmission: 4/5 speed manual

Dimensions
- Wheelbase: 1,840 millimetres (72 in)
- Length: 3,195 mm (125.8 in)
- Width: 1,395 mm (54.9 in)
- Height: 1,625–1,900 mm (64.0–74.8 in)
- Curb weight: 585–785 kg (1,290–1,731 lb)

In December 1982, the Van portion of the Carry range became separated in the Japanese domestic market and was now sold as the Suzuki Every. The Every was only available with the four-stroke engine, as the two-stroke could not pass the tighter emissions standards for passenger cars. A four-wheel drive van version was added in November 1982. In the domestic market Every powered by a 543 cc four-stroke F5A engine.

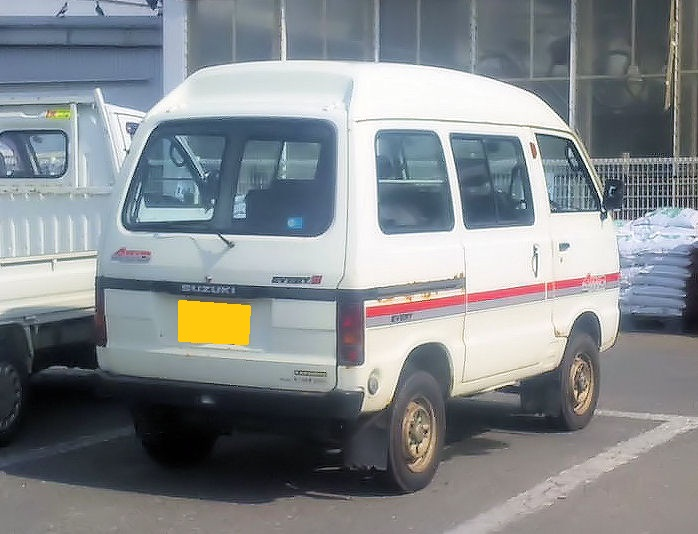
Rear view

== Second generation (DA/DB#1; 1985) ==
Second generation (DA71V/DB71V/DA41V/DB41V/DA51V/DB51V)
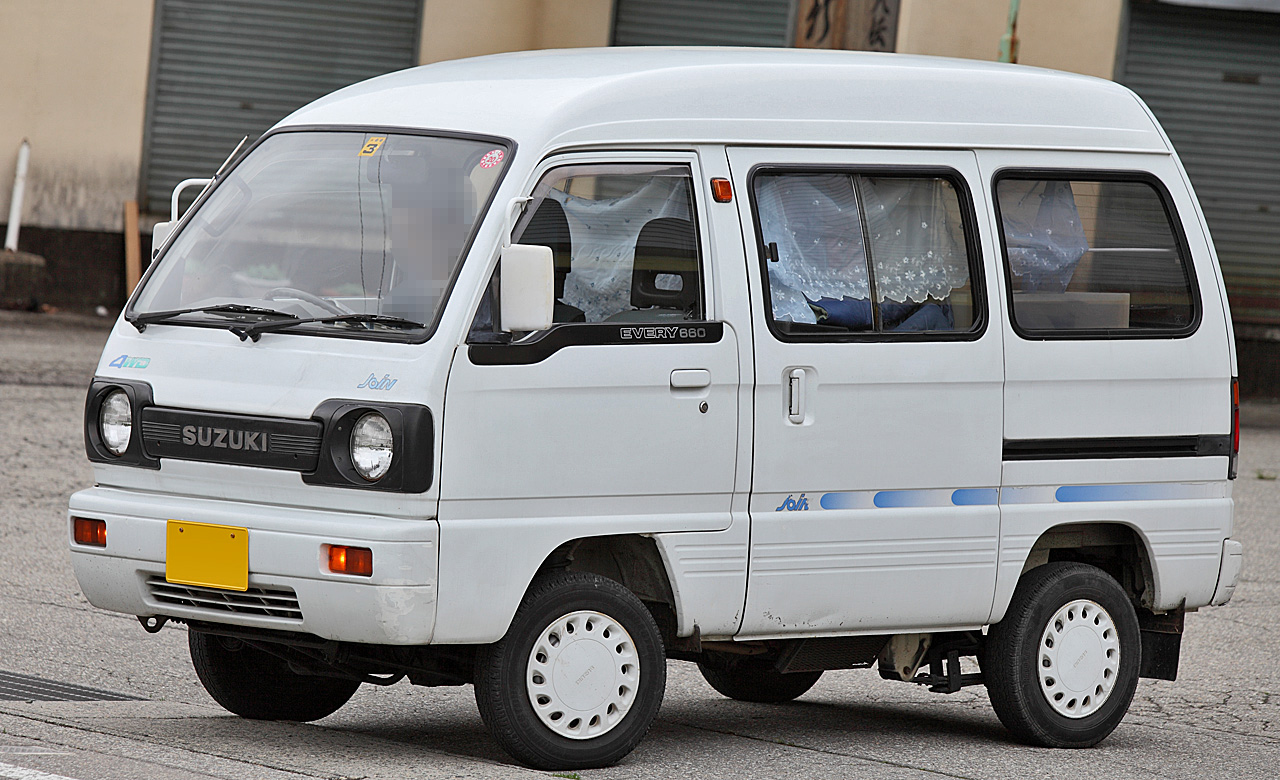
- 1990 Suzuki Every Join 4WD (Facelift)

Overview
- Manufacturer: Suzuki
- Also called: Autozam Scrum (1989–1991); Suzuki Carry/Super Carry (export models); Bedford Rascal; Daewoo Damas
- Production: 1985–1991
- Assembly: Japan: Iwata, Shizuoka (Iwata Plant); United Kingdom: Luton (Vauxhall Luton; Bedford Rascal)

Body and chassis
- Body style: 4-door van
- Layout: FMR layout

Powertrain
- Engine: 543 cc F5A I3; 547 cc F5B I3; 657 cc F6A I3
- Transmission: 4/5-speed manual 3-speed automatic

Dimensions
- Wheelbase: 1,840 mm (72 in)
- Length: 3,195 mm (126 in); 3,295 mm (130 in) (660cc model)
- Height: 1,710–1,920 mm (67–76 in)
- Curb weight: 670–780 kg (1,477–1,720 lb)

The second generation Every appeared in March 1985 along with the commercial version Carry.

In May 1989 The engine was changed from the previous F5A type to the F5B type. A new grade called Joypop Sound was introduced, features audio equipment, and included a cassette deck, which was optional on other grades, as standard equipment for Joypop Sound grade, and adopted uniquely shaped rectangular headlamps. In the same year, the Every was an OEM version by Mazda called Mazda Scrum was released.

With the rules regarding the size and engines of kei-cars being altered for March 1990, Suzuki had to update the Carry/Every which now carried the DA/DB51 chassis code, the headlights became standard round twin lights. in March 1991, the DA/DB51 was replaced by the reshelled ninth generation Carry and Every.

A badge-engineered version of the Suzuki Every produced by the South Korean automaker Daewoo from 1991 to 2021 called the Daewoo Damas. This vehicle also marketed as The Bedford Rascal (later Vauxhall Rascal) in the European market.

=== Gallery ===
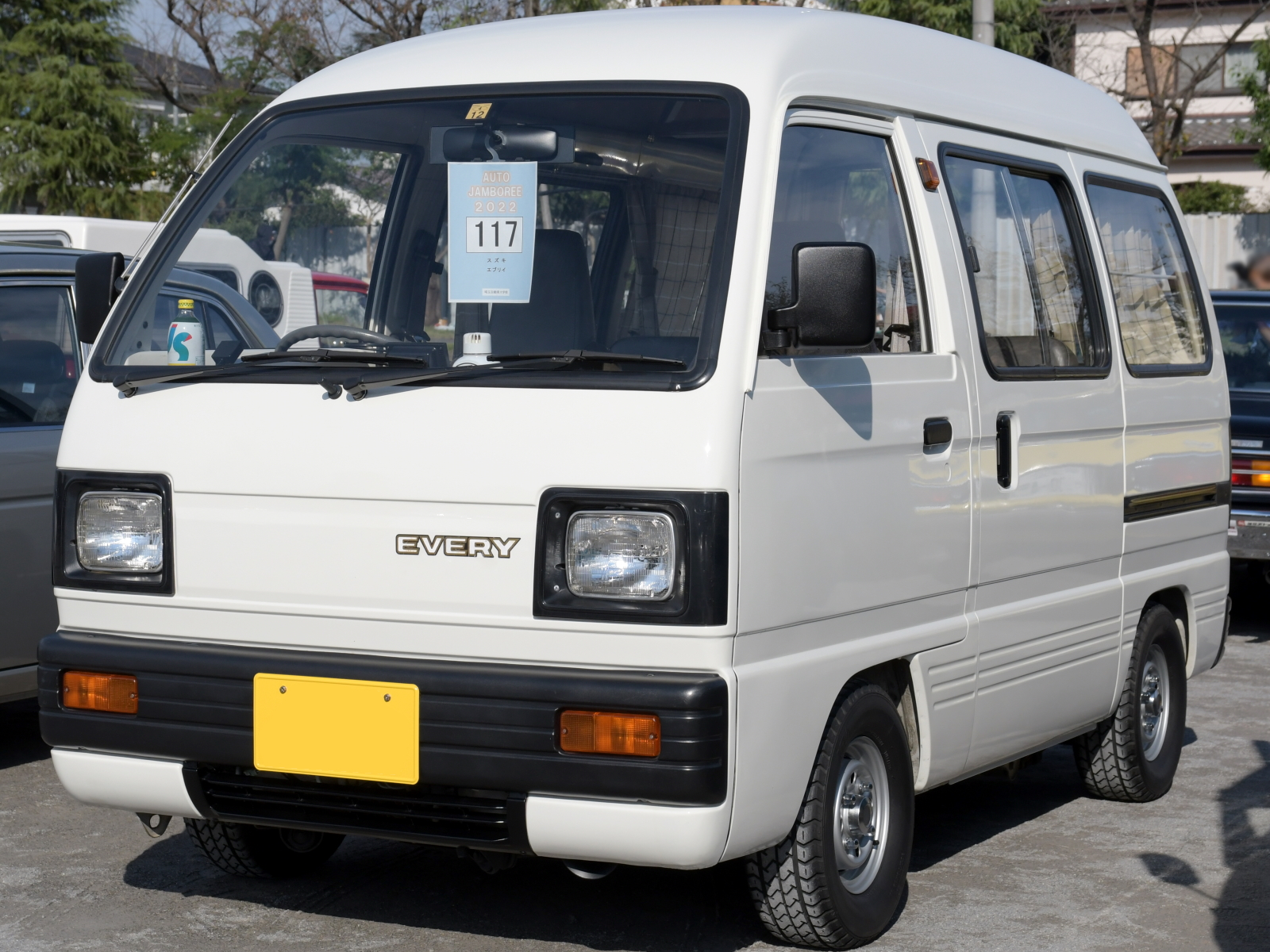
Pre-facelift Suzuki Every PA van (DA71V)

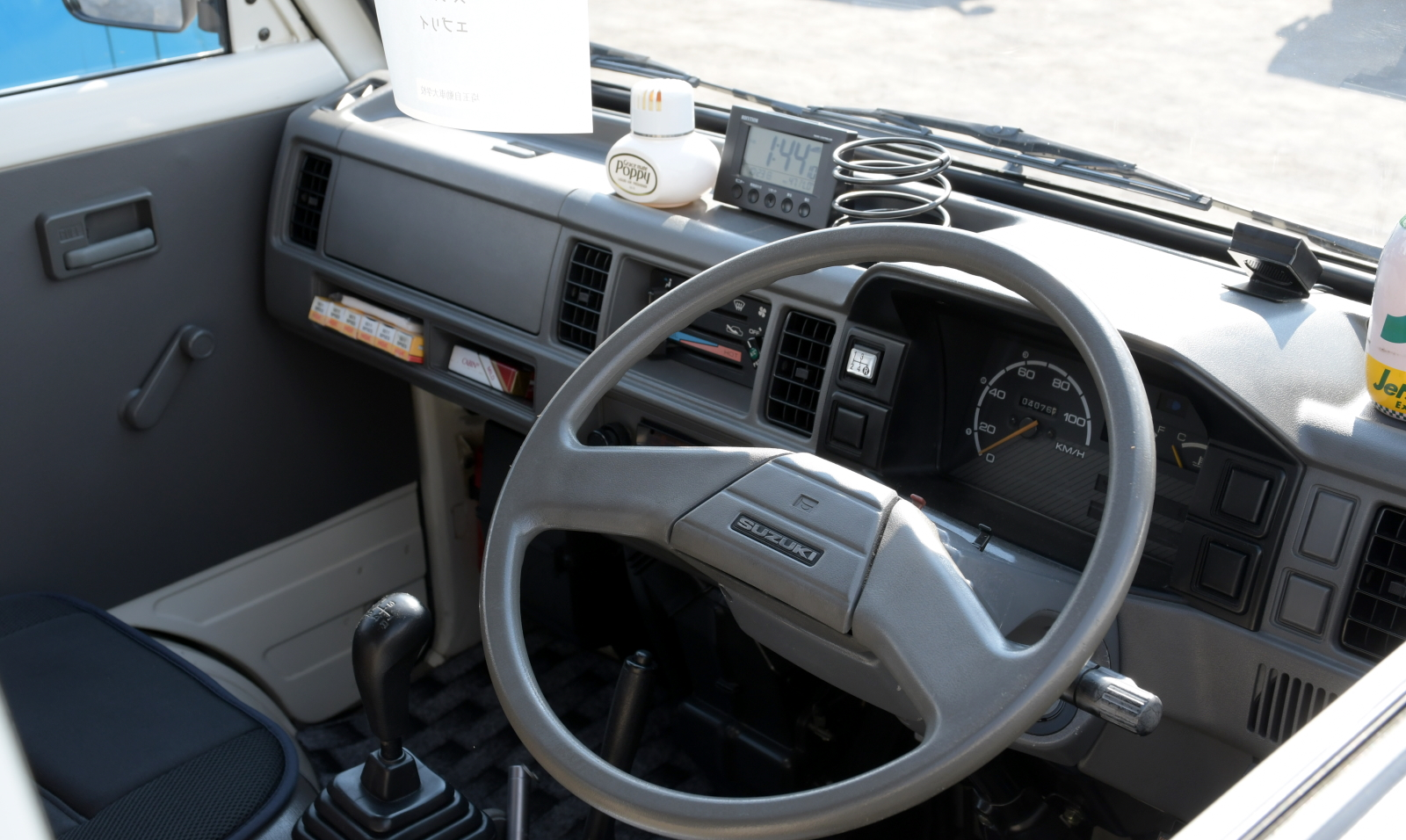
Suzuki Every interior

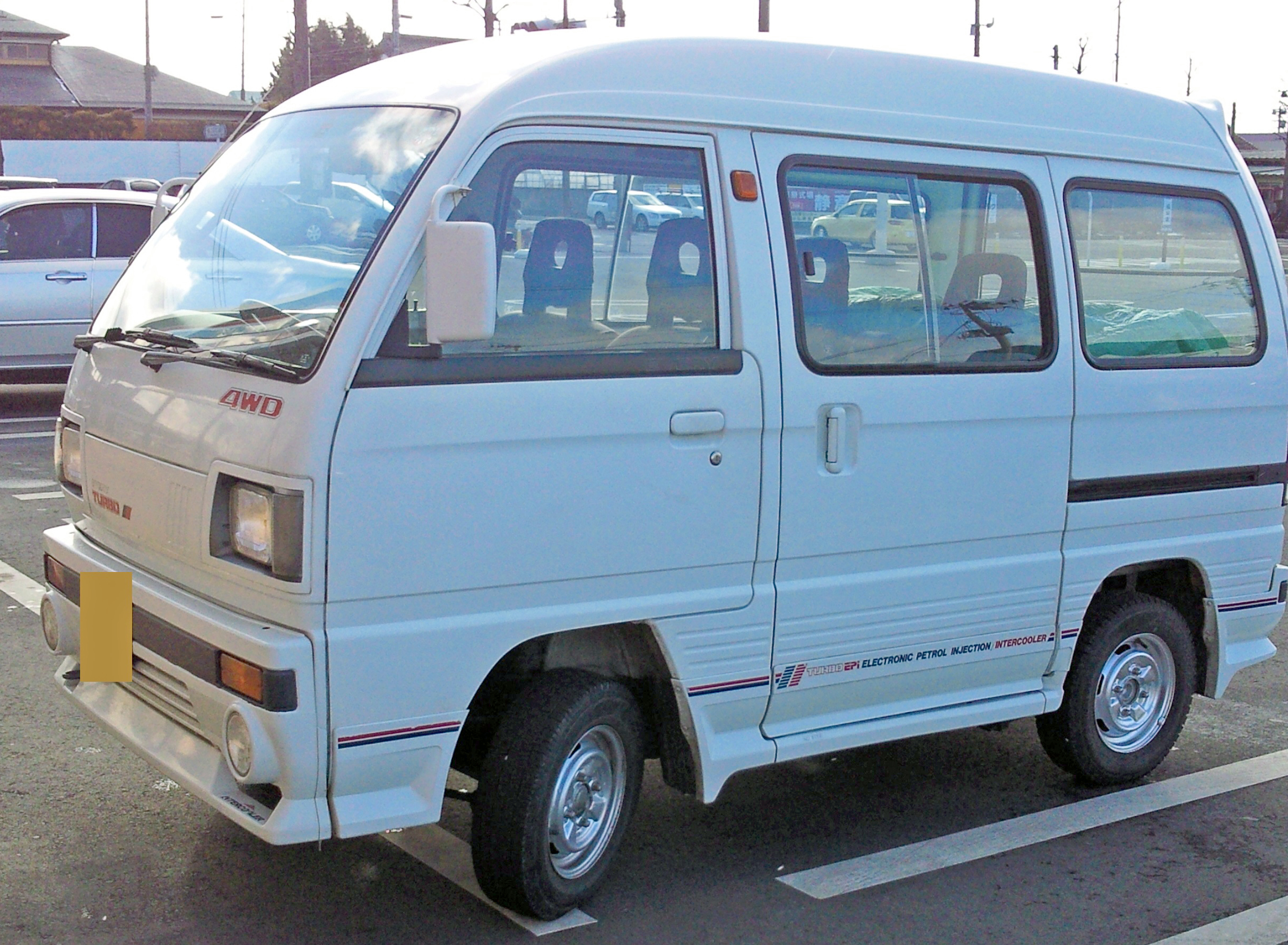
1988–1990 First facelift Every Turbo PS

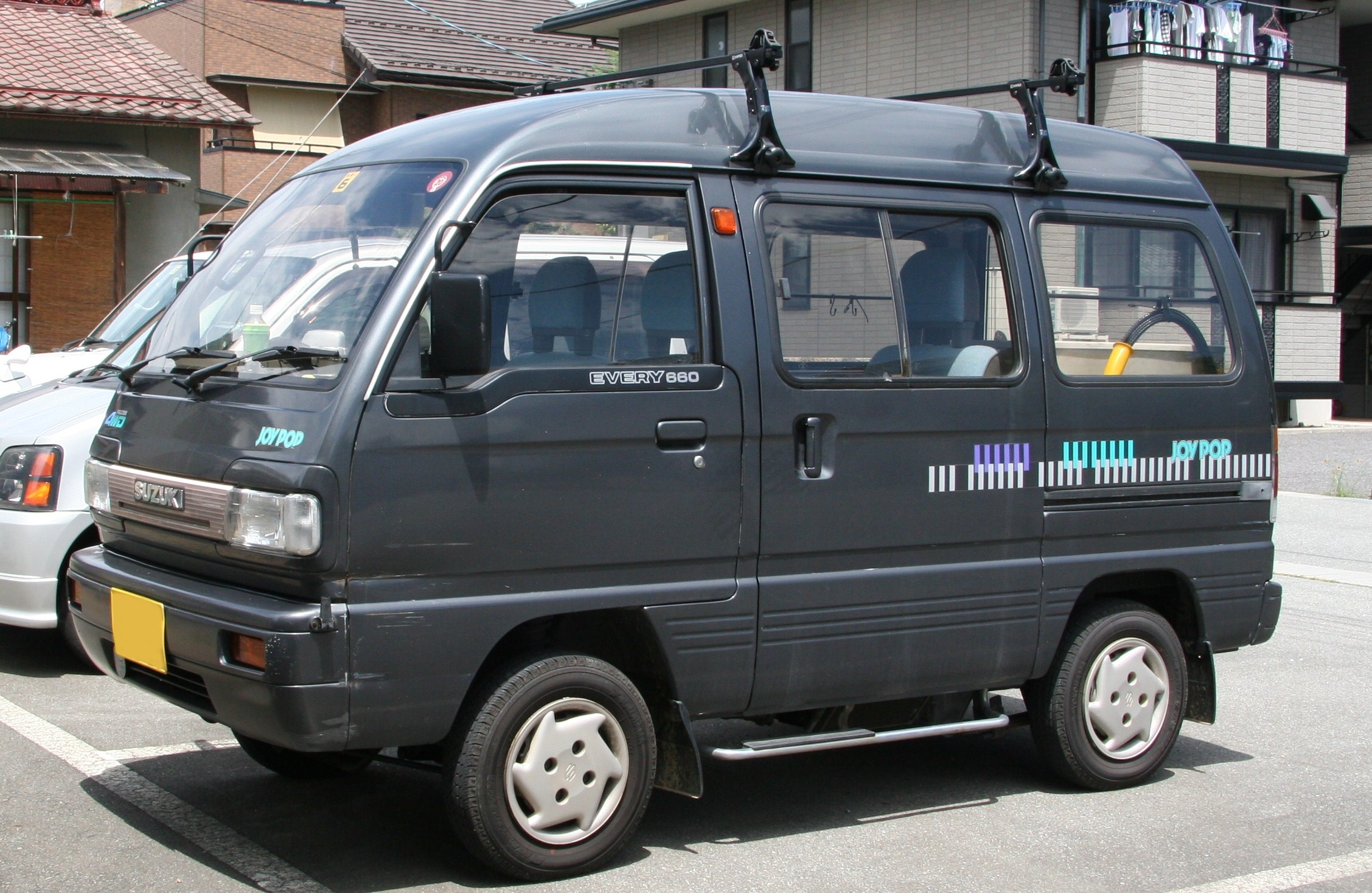
1990–1991 facelifted Suzuki Every Joypop

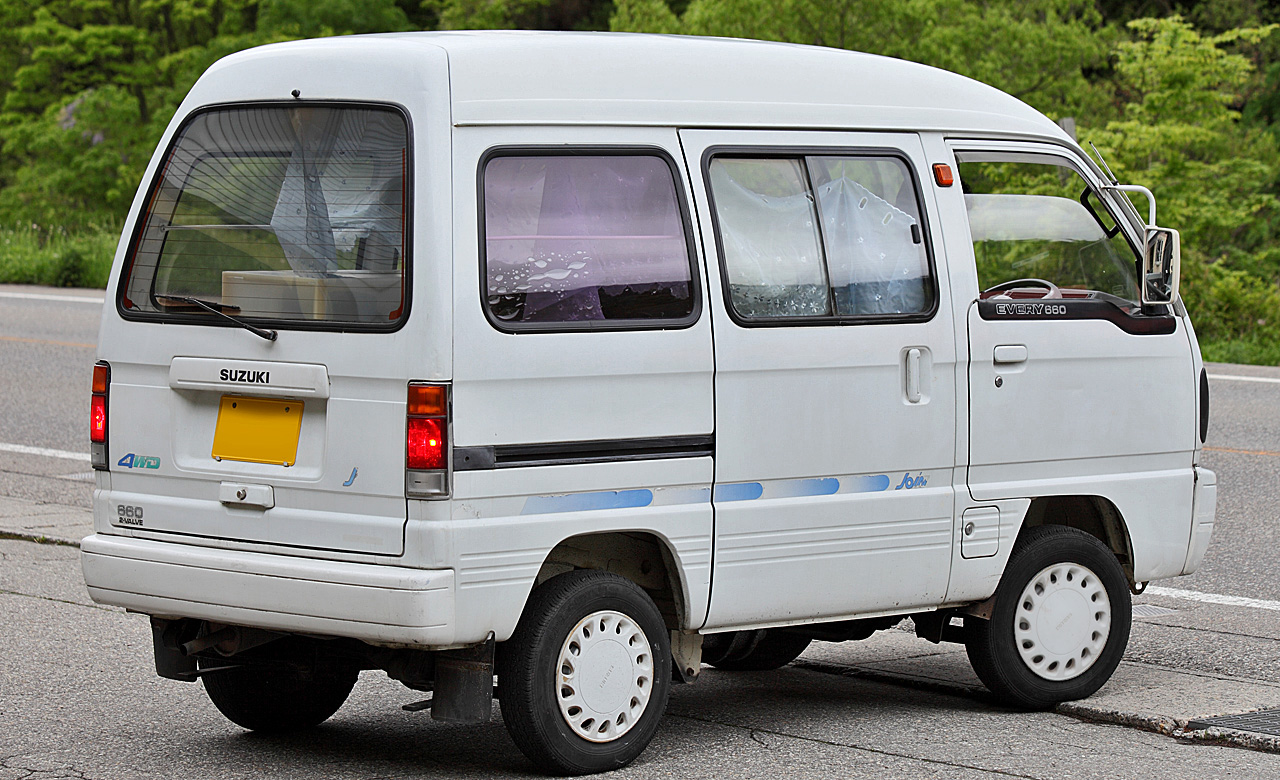
1990–1991 facelifted Suzuki Every van (DA51V)

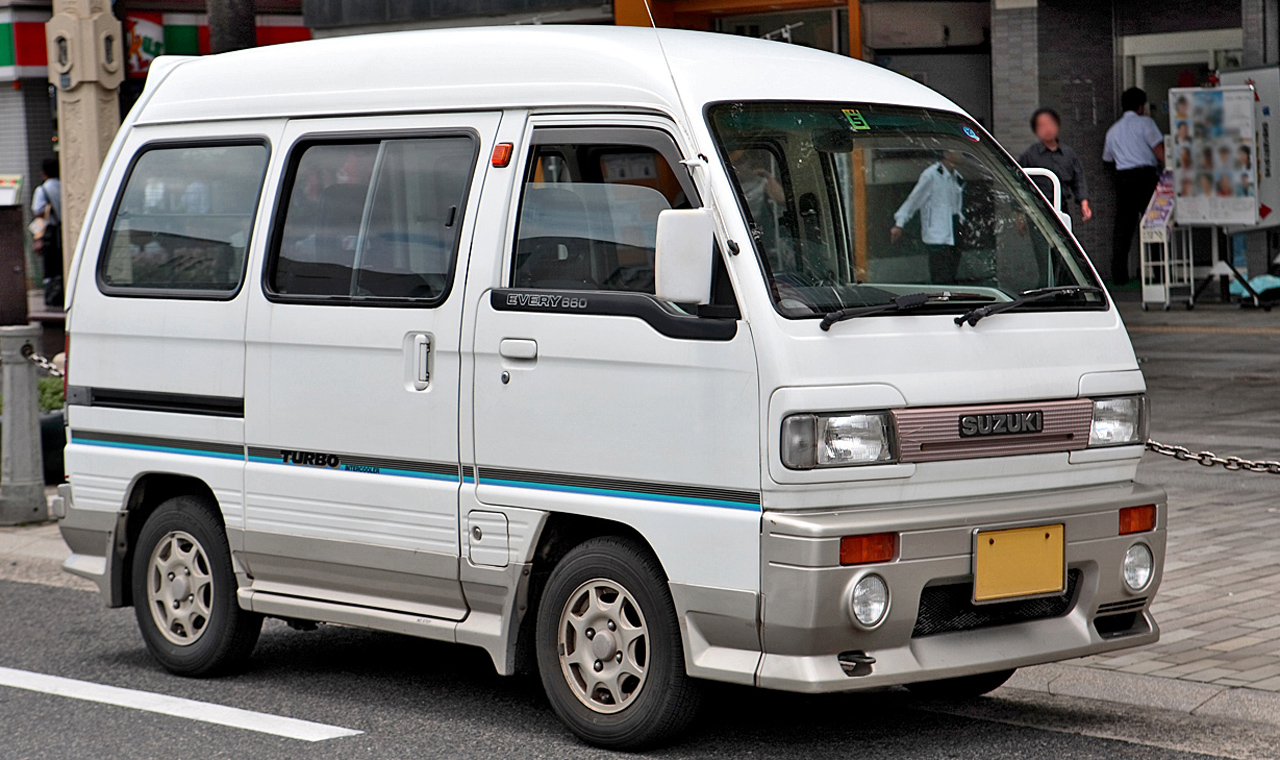
1990 Suzuki Every 660 PS Turbo Aero-tune (DA51V)

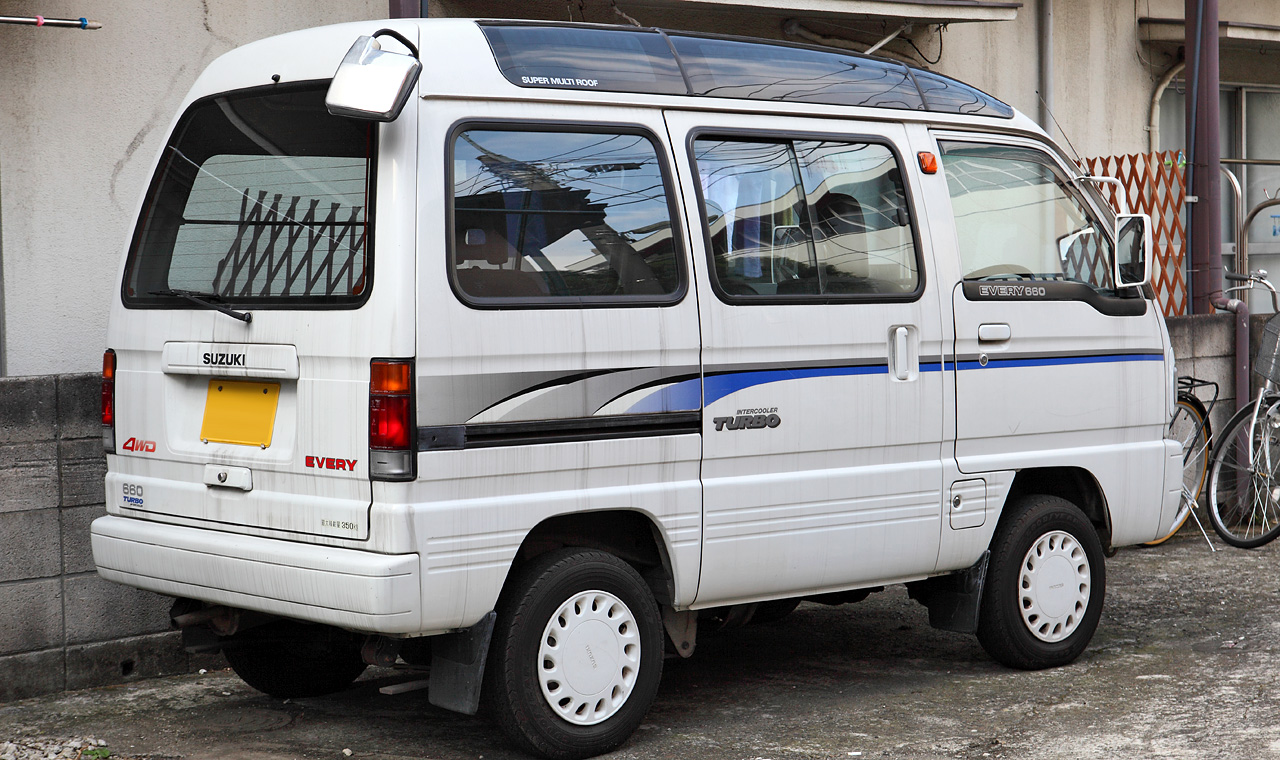
1990 Suzuki Every 660 PS Turbo Aero-tune (DA51V)

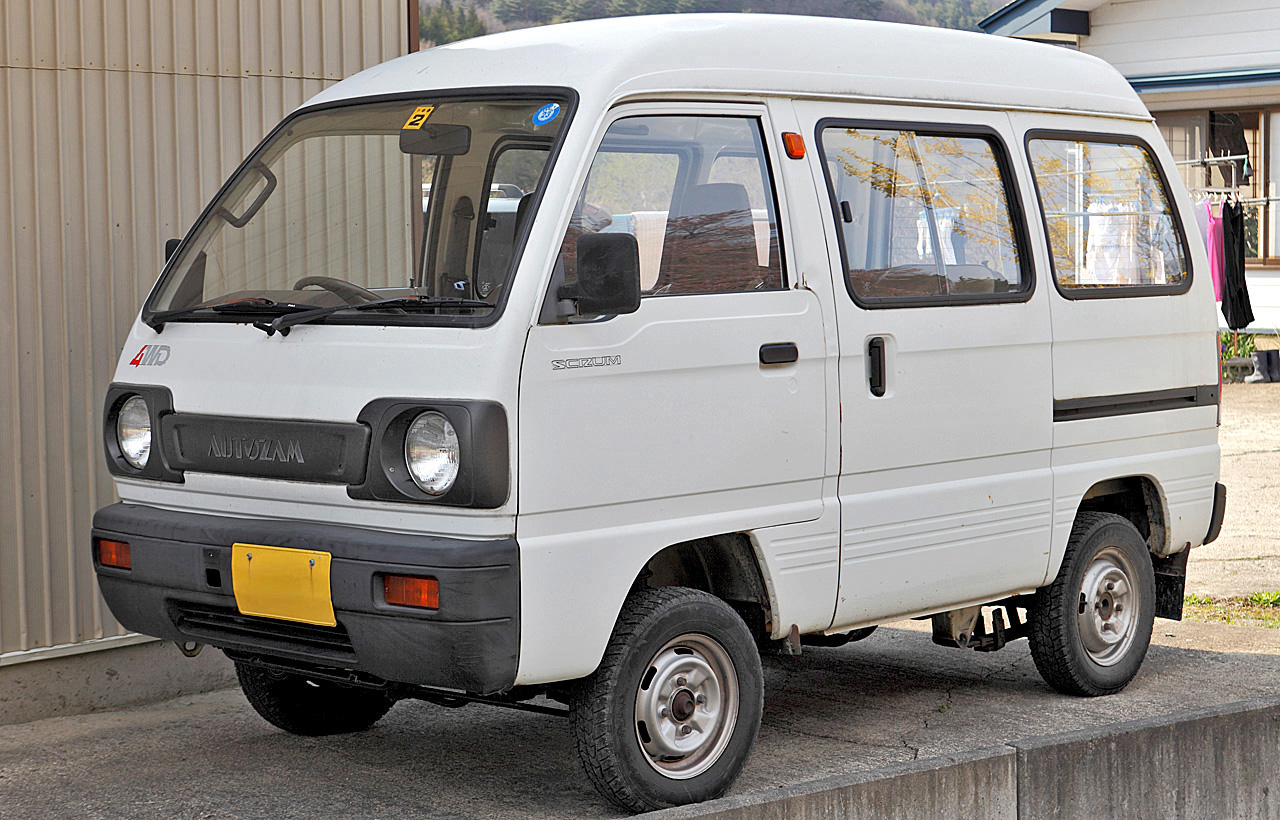
1990–1991 Autozam Scrum van (DG41; first generation)

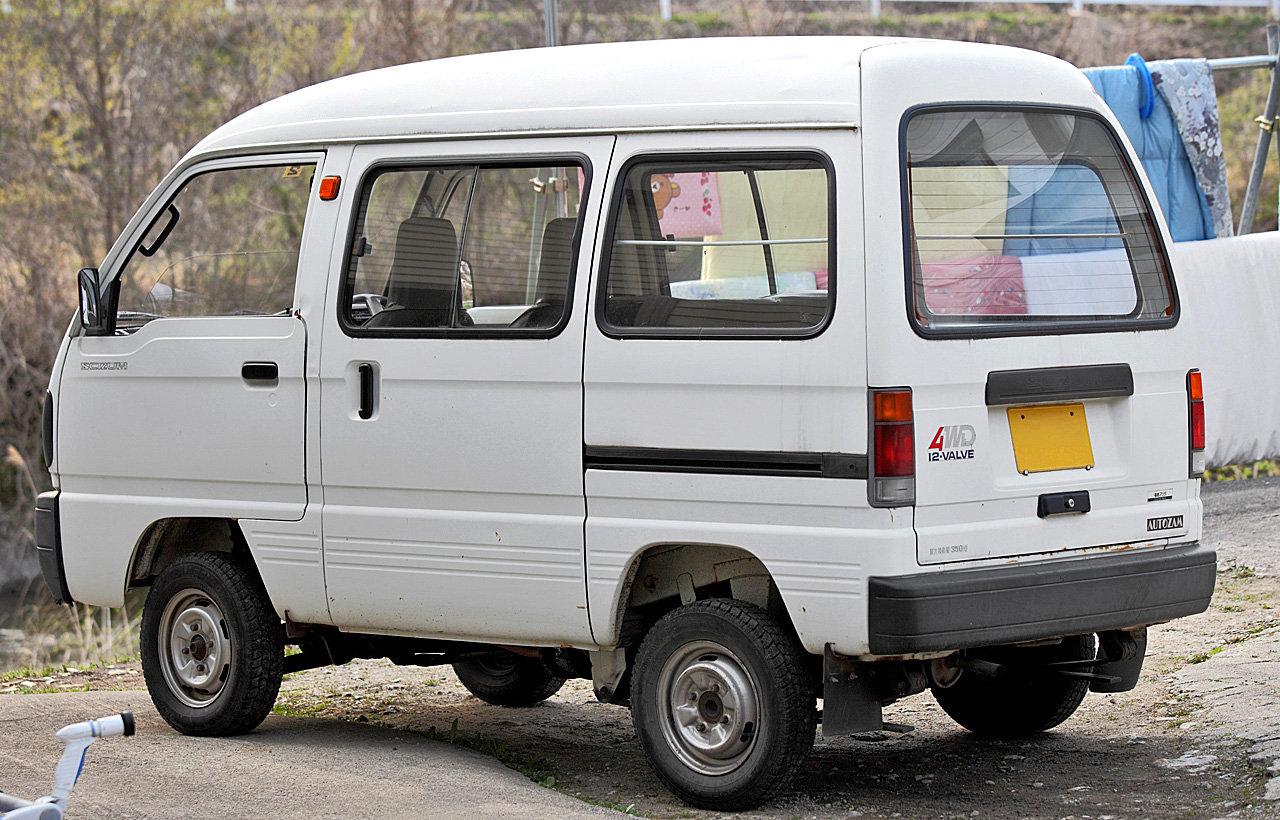
1990–1991 Autozam Scrum van (DG41; first generation)

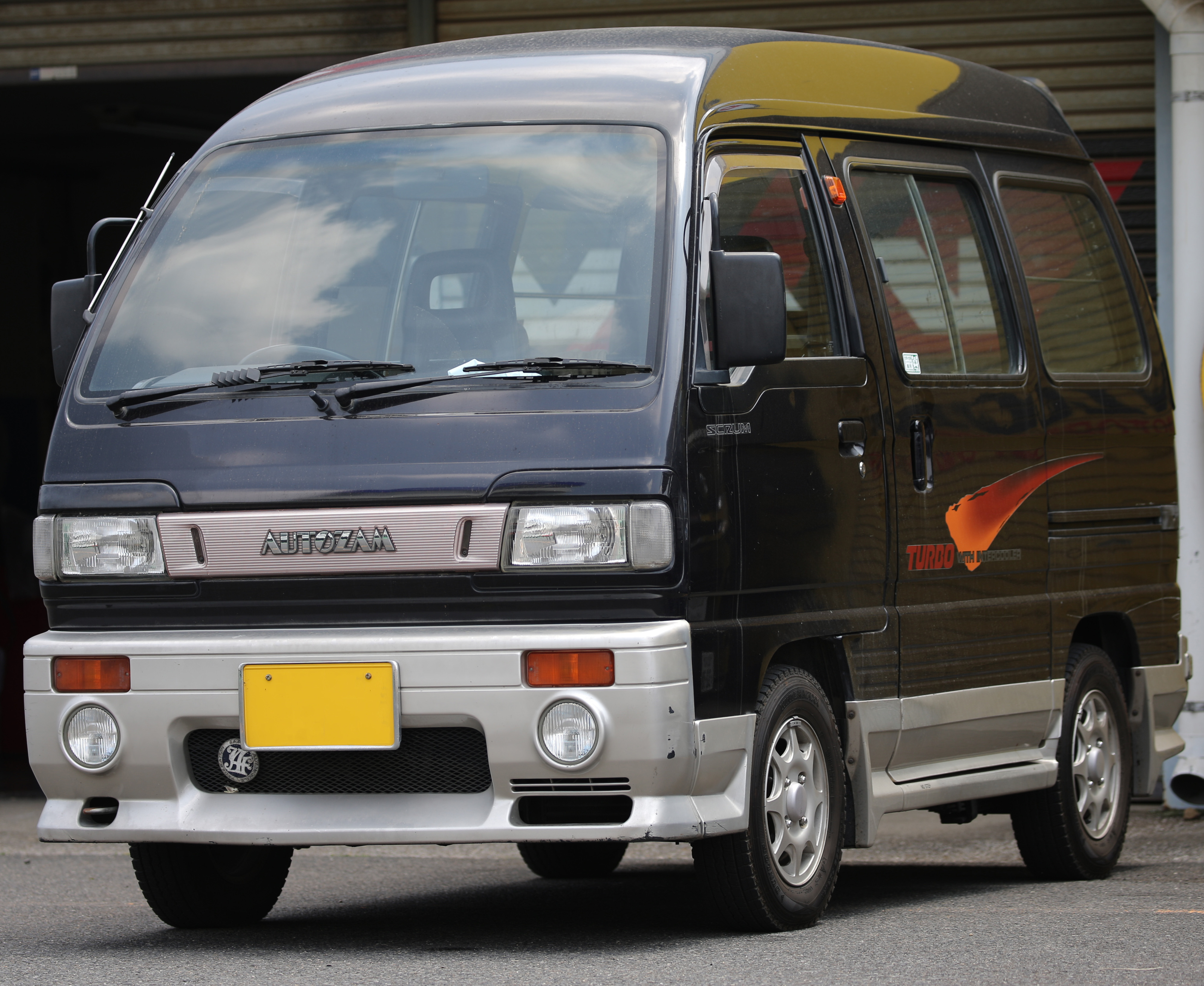
1990–1991 Autozam Scrum Turbo van (first generation)

== Third generation (DE51/DF51; 1991) ==
Third generation (DE51/DF51)
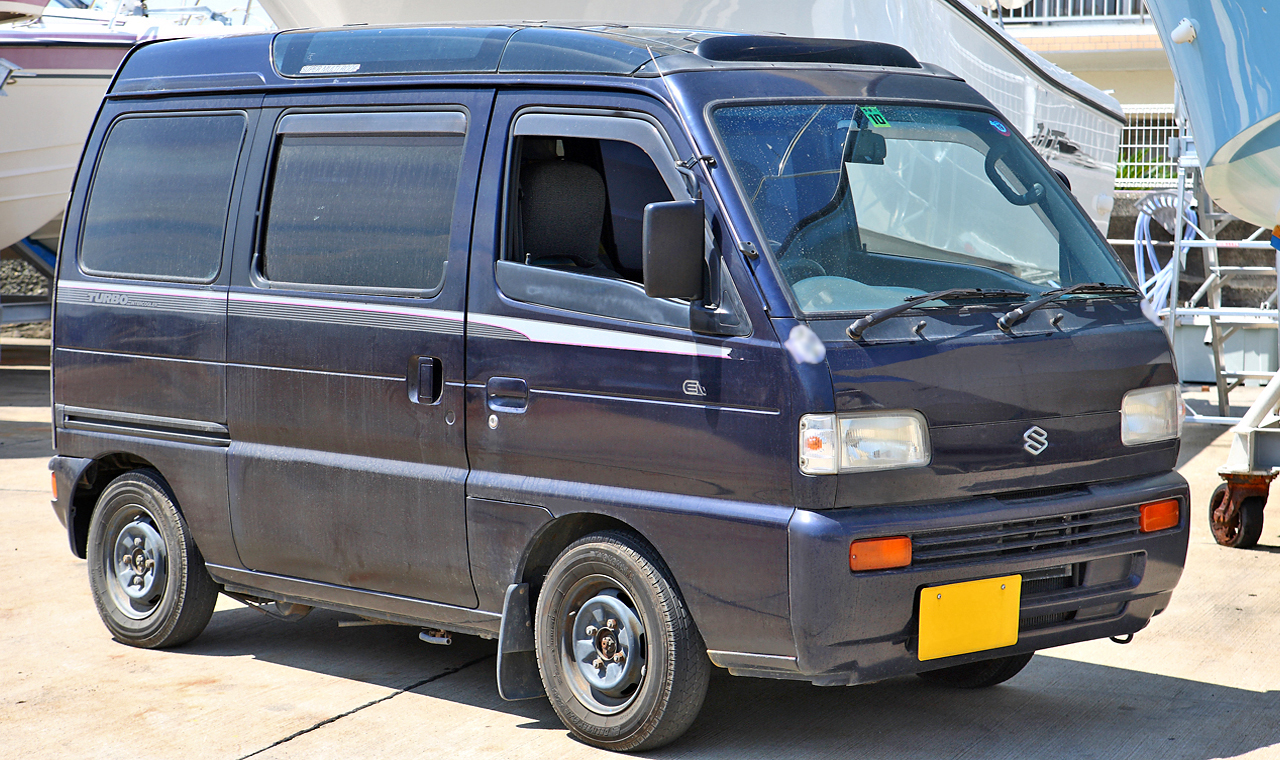

Overview
- Also called: Mazda/Autozam Scrum; Suzuki Carry (commercial models; until 1993)
- Production: 1991–1998
- Assembly: Japan: Iwata, Shizuoka

Body and chassis
- Body style: 2-door pickup 5-door van/microbus
- Layout: mid-engine, rear-wheel drive mid-engine, four-wheel drive

Powertrain
- Engine: 657 cc F6A I3; 657 cc F6A turbo I3
- Transmission: 5-speed manual 4-speed manual 3-speed automatic

Dimensions
- Wheelbase: 2,350 mm (93 in)
- Length: 3,395 mm (134 in)
- Width: 1,395 mm (55 in)
- Height: 1,745–1,865 mm (69–73 in)
- Curb weight: 770–950 kg (1,698–2,094 lb)

The third generation Every appeared in September 1991 along with the ninth generation Suzuki Carry. Chassis codes changed accordingly, and were now different for the Carry and the Every. Two different front treatments were available, It was sold as two models: the commercial van called the Carry Van and the higher-end type Every. The Carry Van and Every differed in their rear seats; the former had a single, low-back seat, while the latter had a split seat with removable headrests, indicating a passenger-oriented design. Furthermore, the front emblem differed: the Carry Van featured the "SUZUKI" logo, while the Every had an "S" mark.

In November 1993, the Carry Van line switched to the Every nameplate and the division between trucks and vans was made clearer. Since November 1993, all Japanese-market Carry vans have been called Suzuki Every.

In late 1997, the retro-styled Suzuki Every C arrived. Features a rounded headlights and chromed grille.

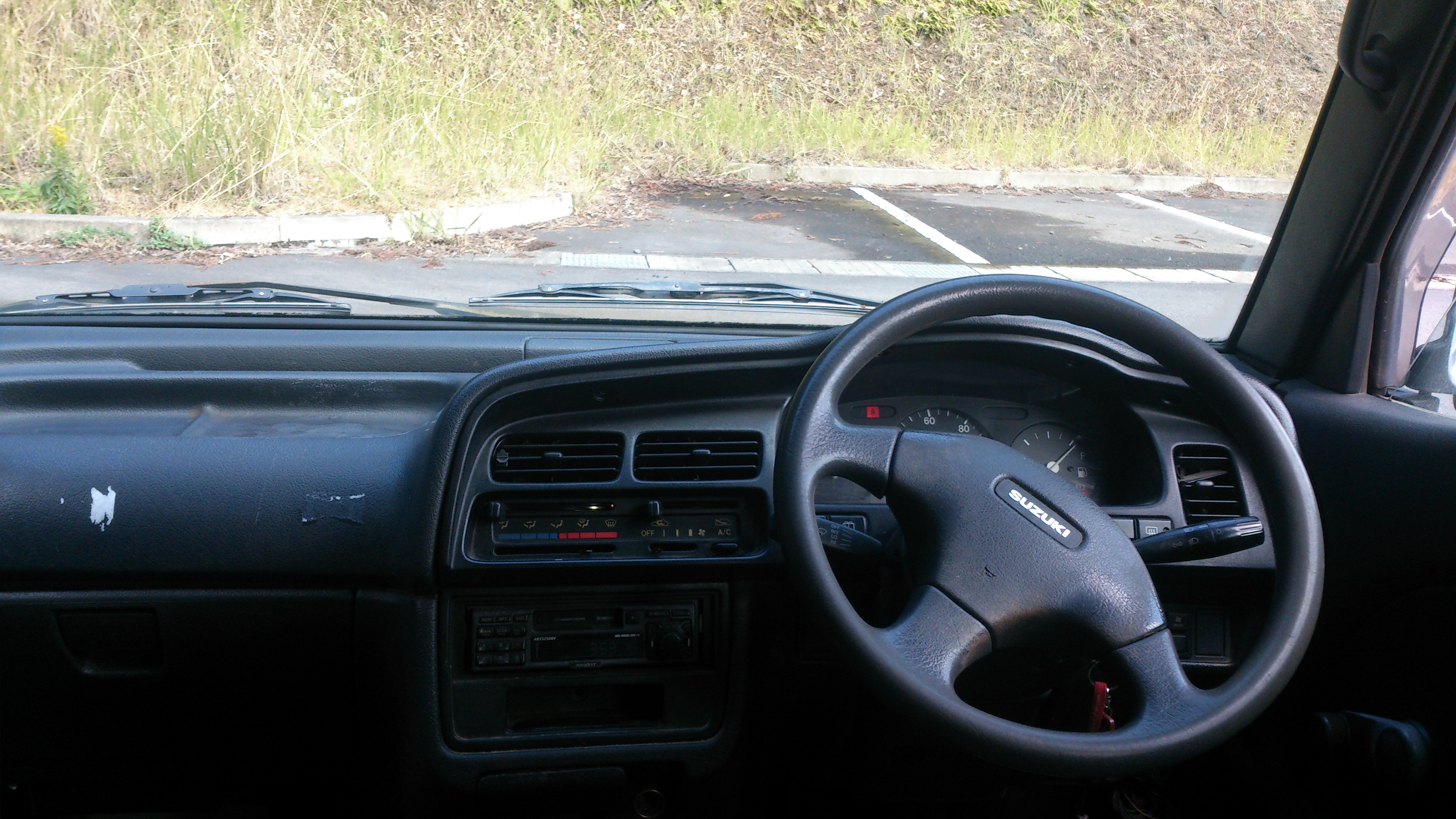
Interior

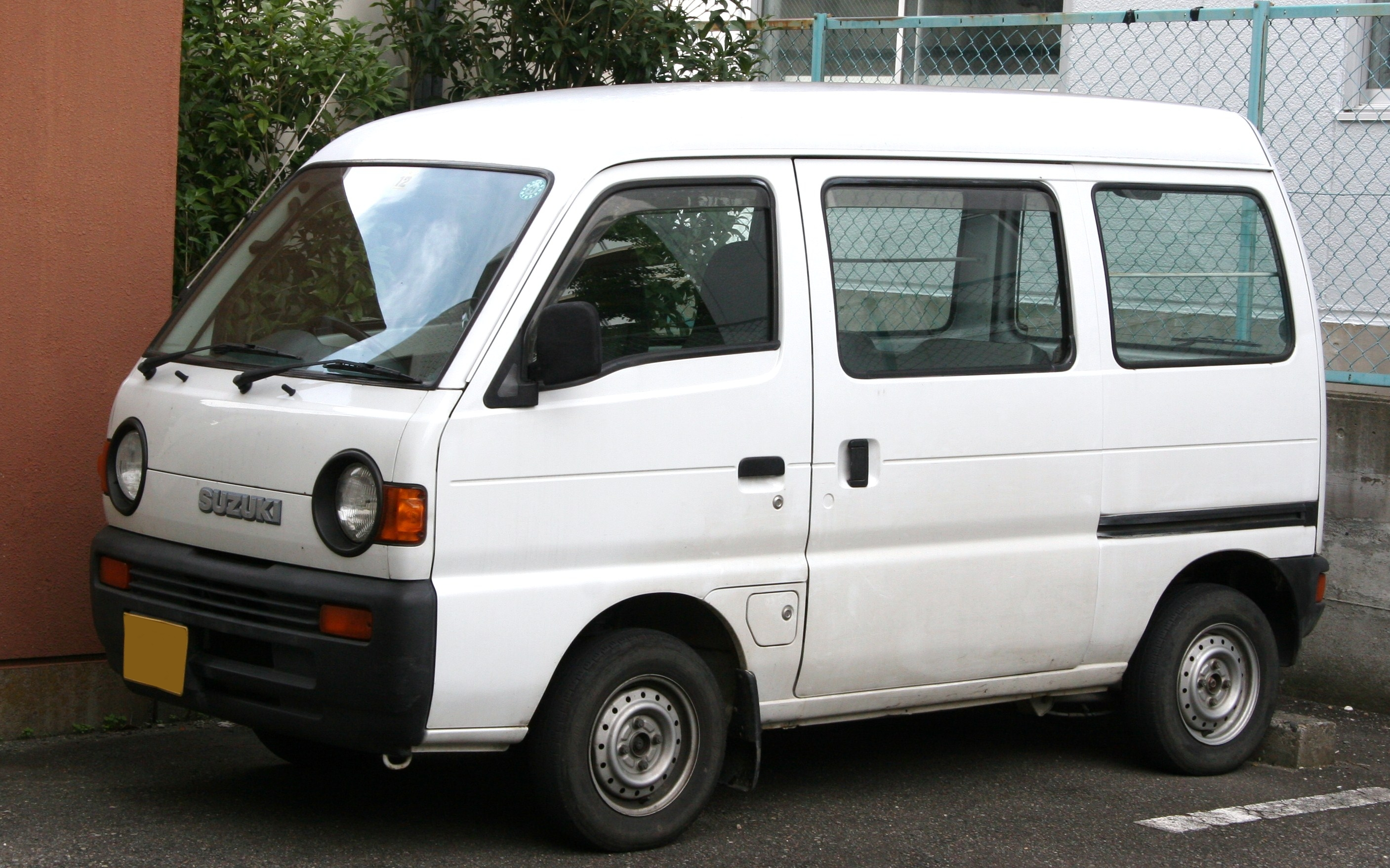
Suzuki Carry van (DE51V, 1991–1993)

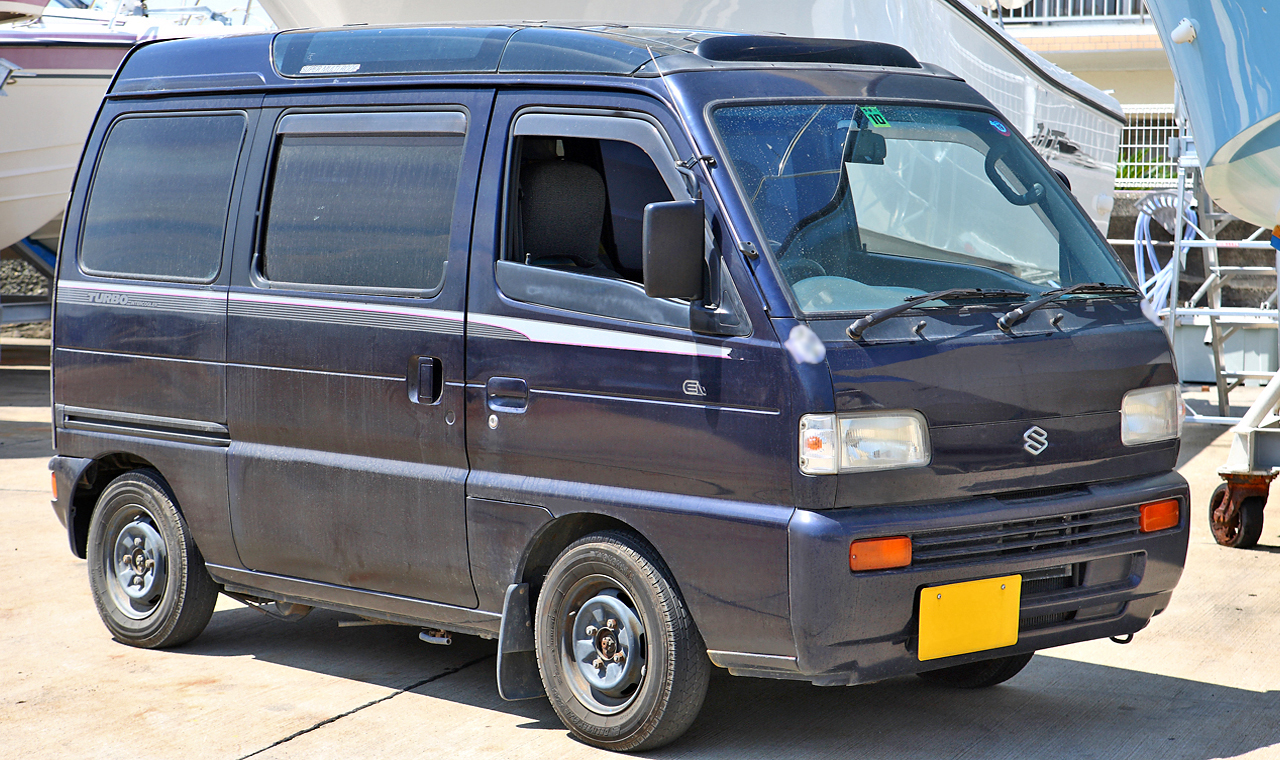
Suzuki Every 660 Turbo RZ Super Multi Roof (DE51V)

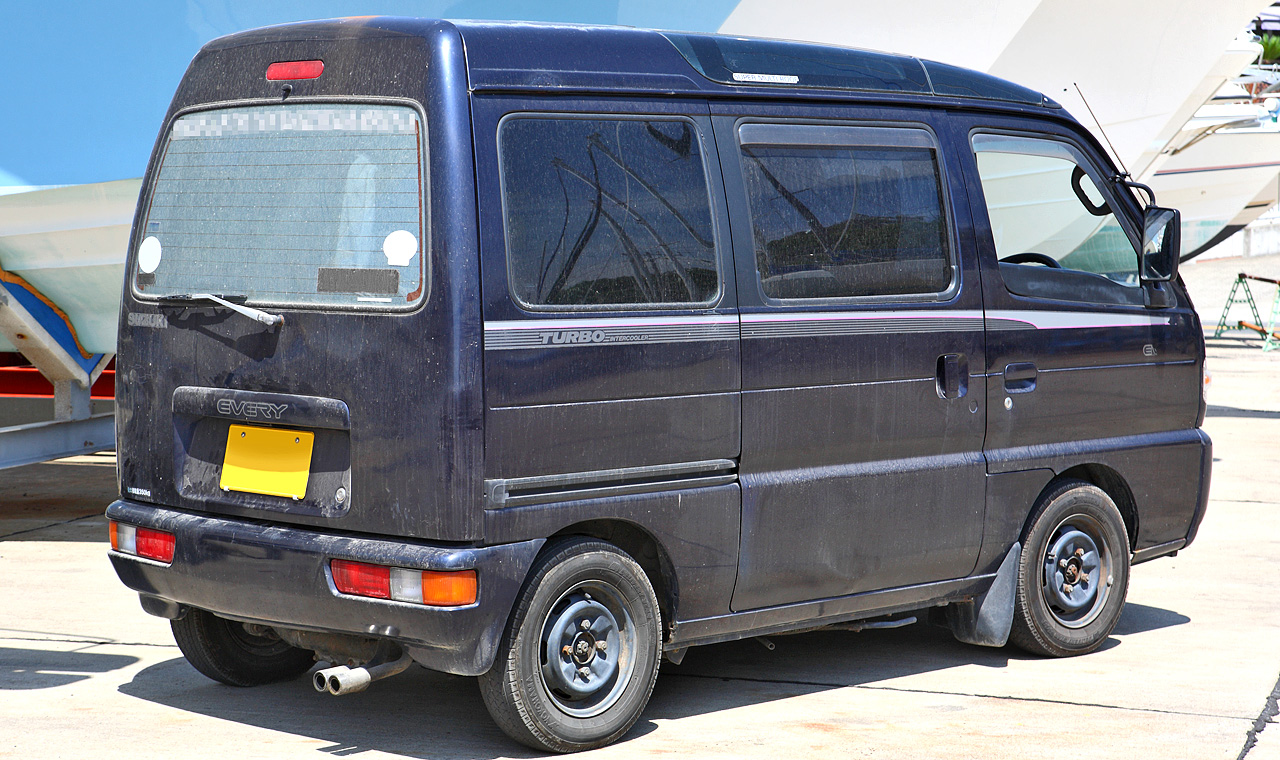
Suzuki Every 660 Turbo RZ Super Multi Roof (DE51V)

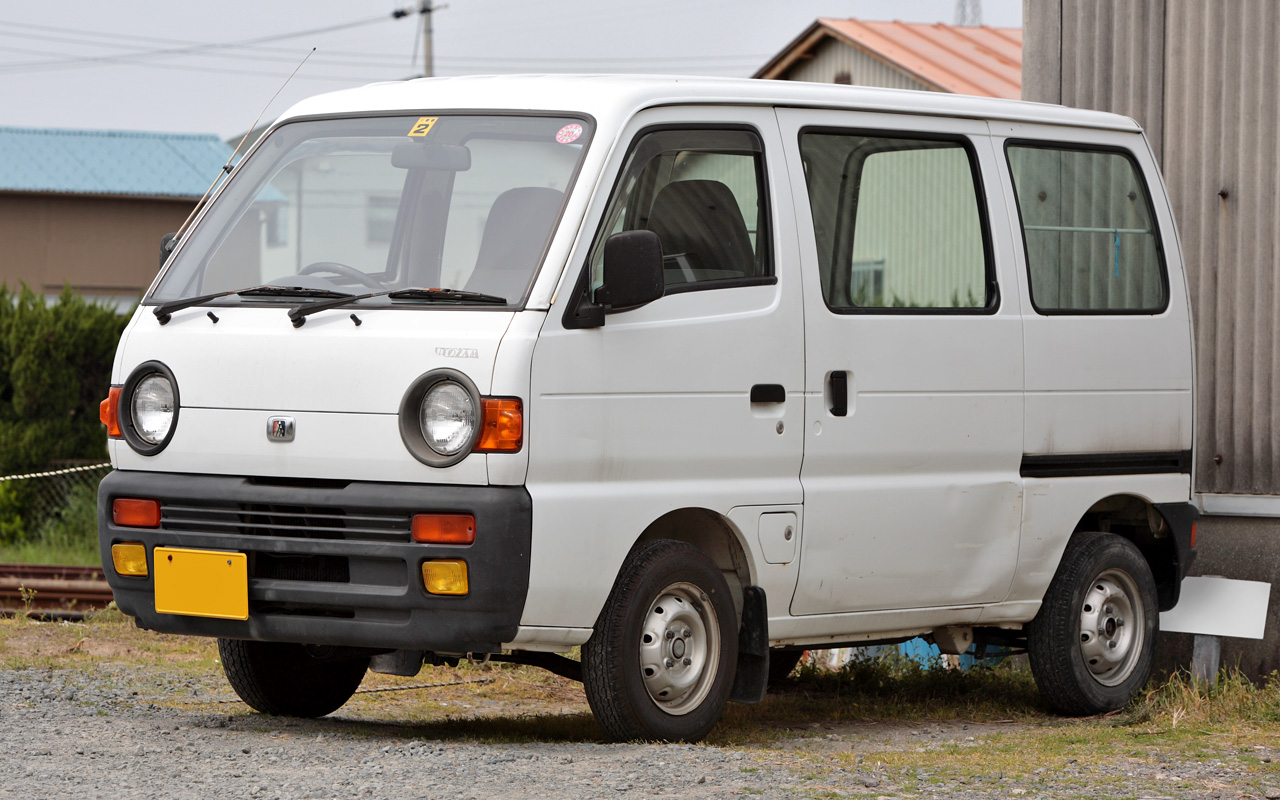
Autozam Scrum van (second generation)

== Fourth generation (DA52/DB52/DA62; 1999) ==
Fourth generation (DA52/DB52/DA62)
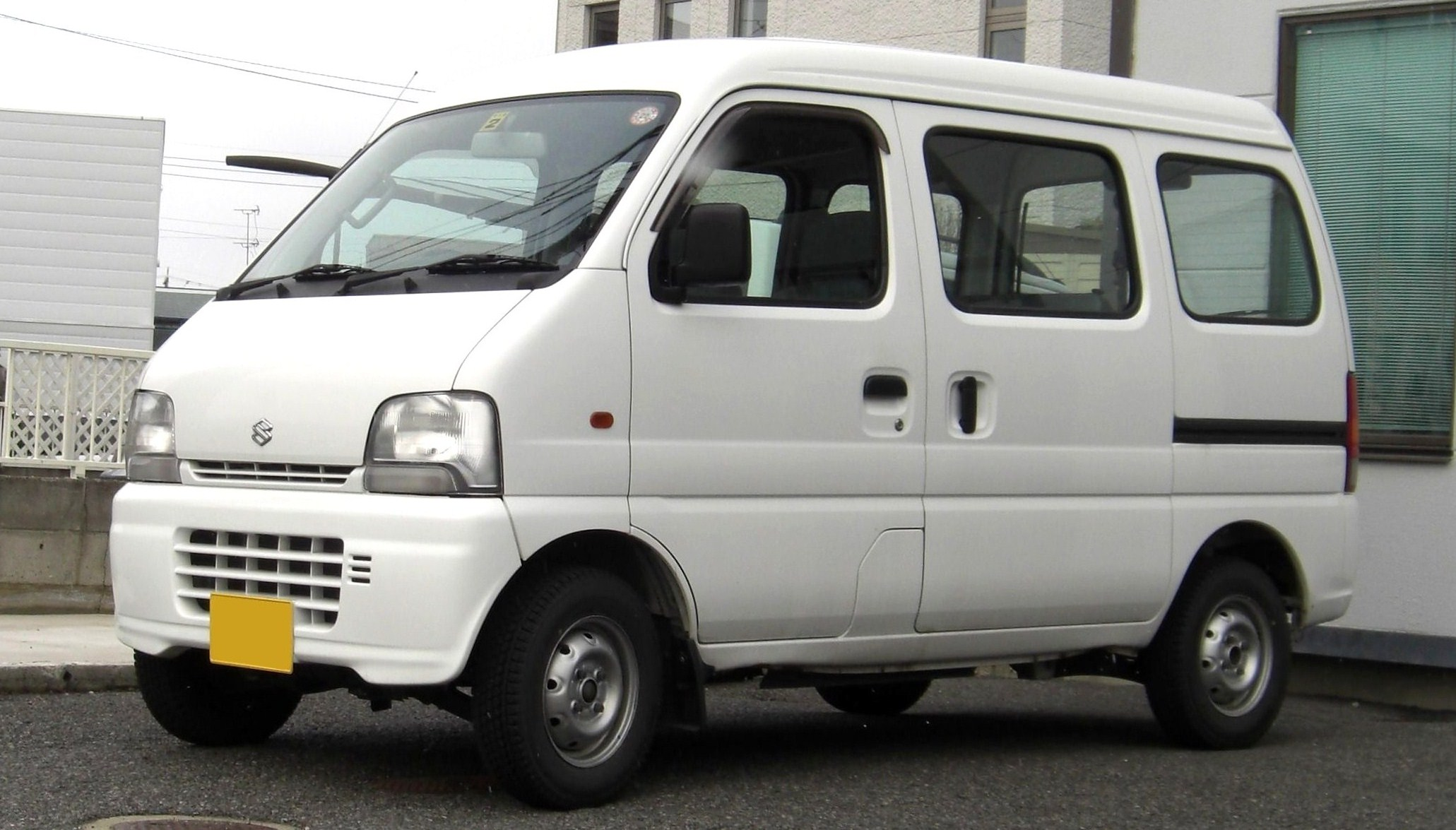
- 1999 Suzuki Every Van

Overview
- Also called: Mazda Scrum; Ford Pronto PR-Z (Taiwan)
- Production: January 1999– August 2005
- Assembly: Japan: Iwata, Shizuoka; Taiwan (Ford Lio Ho)

Body and chassis
- Body style: 5-door van/microbus
- Layout: mid-engine, rear-wheel drive / four-wheel drive

Powertrain
- Engine: 657 cc F6A I3; 657 cc F6A turbo I3; 657 cc K6A I3; 657 cc K6A Turbo I3; 993 cc G10B 16V I4 (Pronto)
- Transmission: 5-speed manual 3-speed automatic 4-speed automatic

Dimensions
- Wheelbase: 2,350 mm (93 in)
- Length: 3,395 mm (134 in)
- Width: 1,475 mm (58 in)
- Height: 1,755–1,885 mm (69–74 in)
- Curb weight: 780–1,000 kg (1,720–2,205 lb)

The fourth generation Every was introduced in January 1999, with its van version dropped the Carry nameplate in favour of Every in Japan.

In August 1999, an electric vehicle model was available.

In June 1999, the DA52W (Every Wagon, only with two-wheel drive) appeared, along with the bigger Every Plus. In September 2001, a version with the more powerful timing chain equipped K6A (still of 657 cc displacement) appeared, as the DA62T/V/W, produces 49 PS (48.3 hp; 36.0 kW).

This model has also been built by Chang'an (Chana) in China, as the "Star" (Zhixing) bus and truck (originally SC6350, SC1015). in which they have gone through many revisions since 2009.

The Carry received a major facelift in 2002, but the Every retained the pre-facelift model.

The Every Van and Wagon continued to be produced until replaced in August 2005, as the two lines continued a process of divergence begun with the introduction of the Every in 1982. The kei truck version Carry still production until 2013.

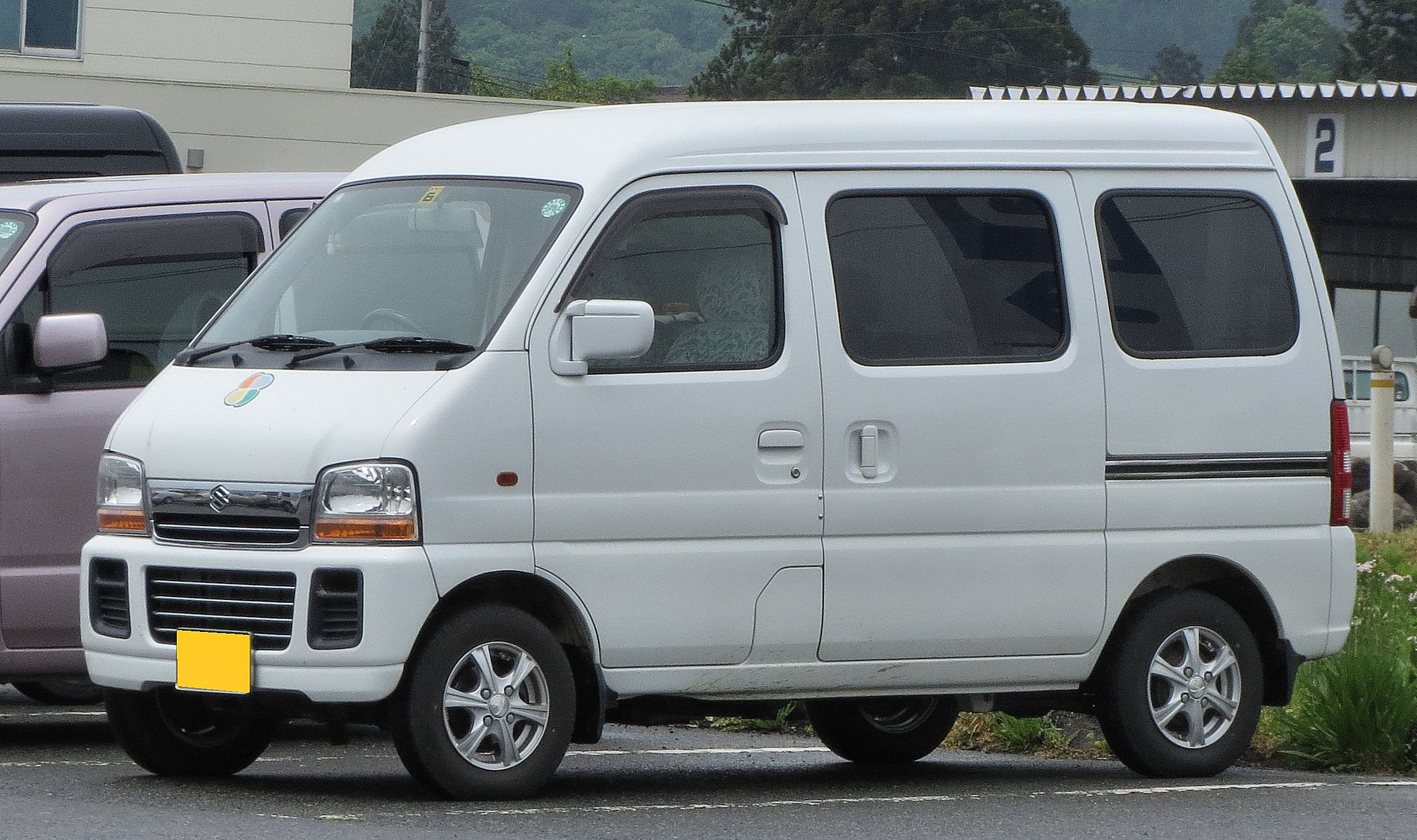
Suzuki Every Join Turbo

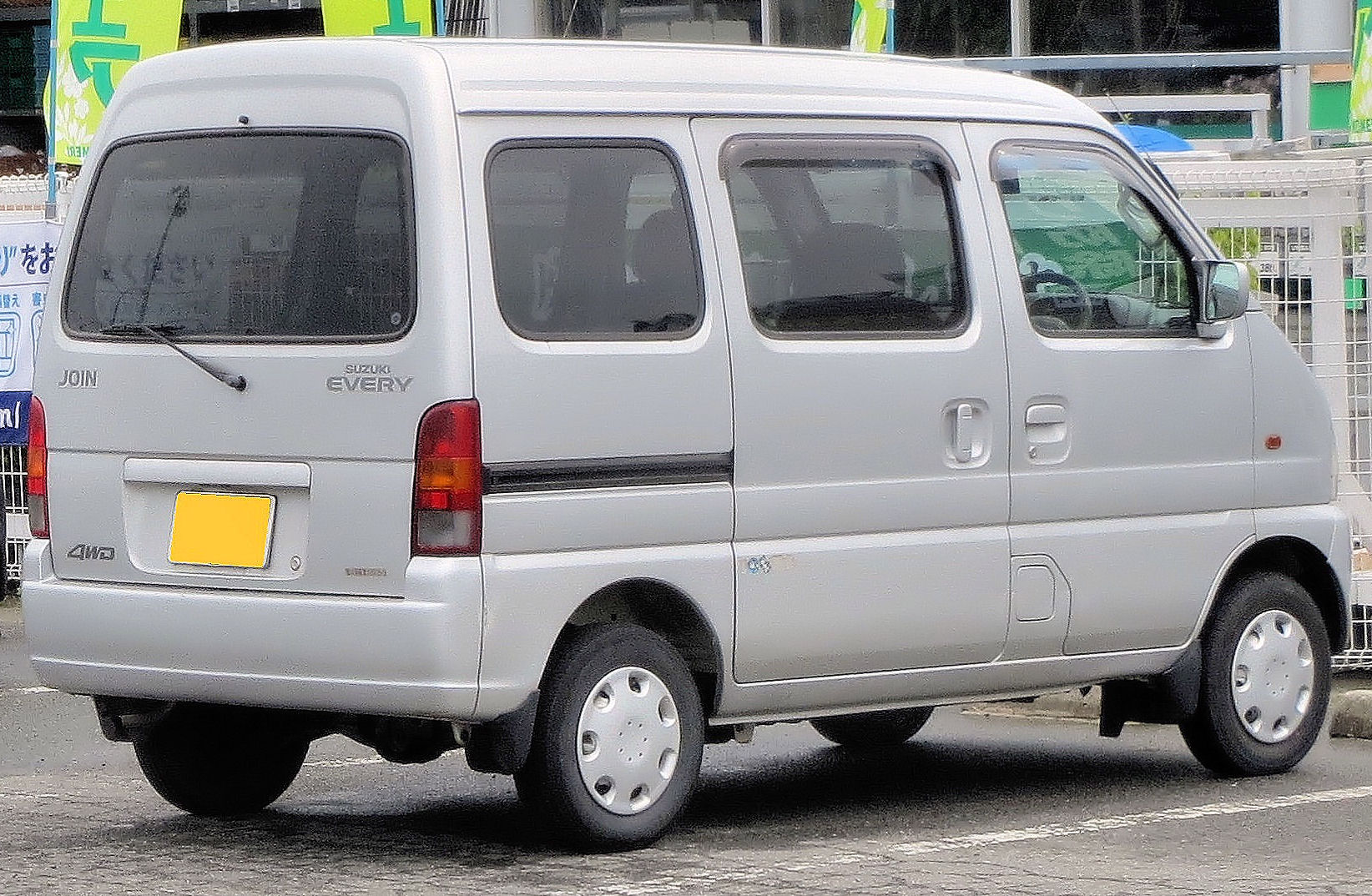
Suzuki Every Join Turbo

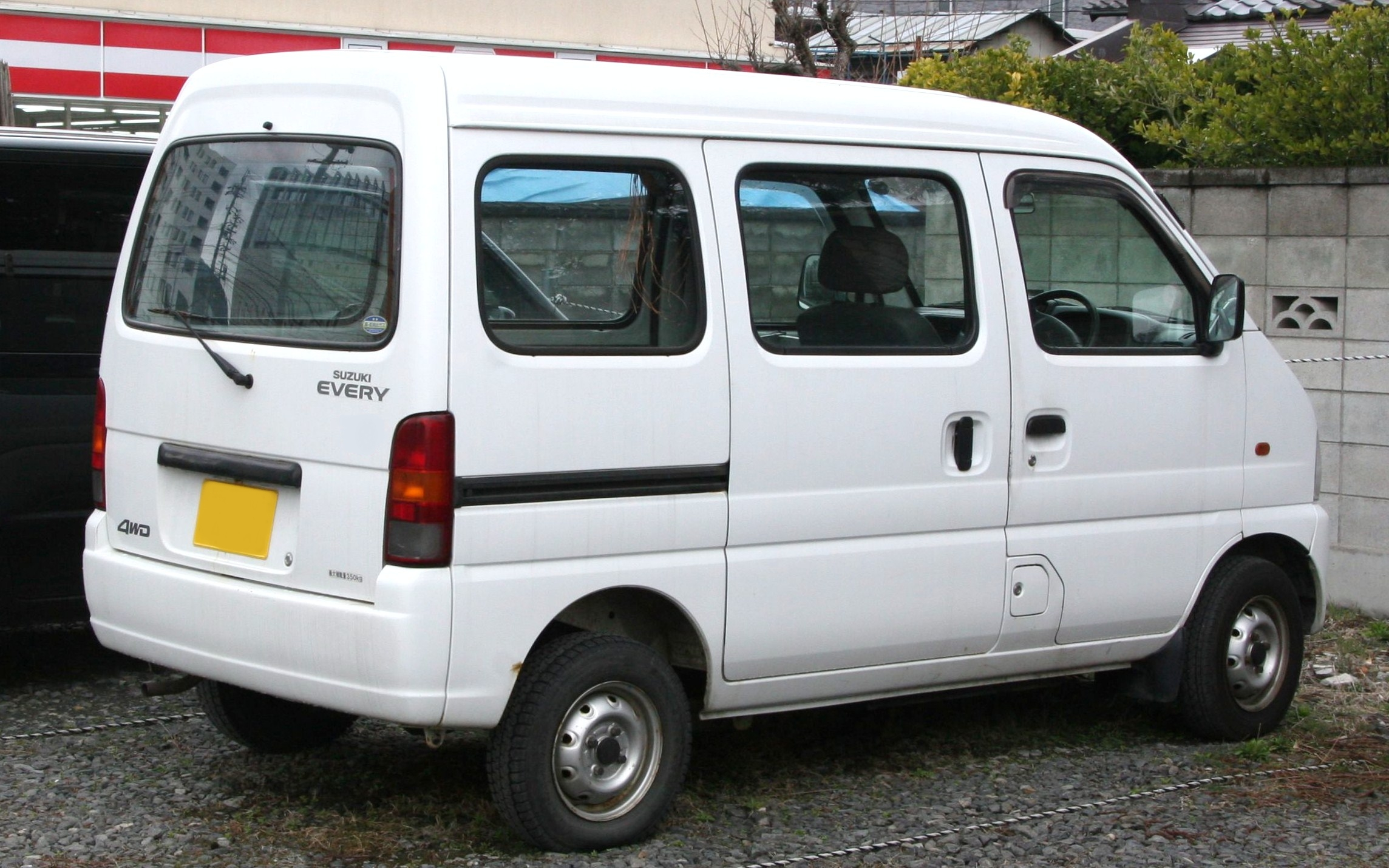
Every rear

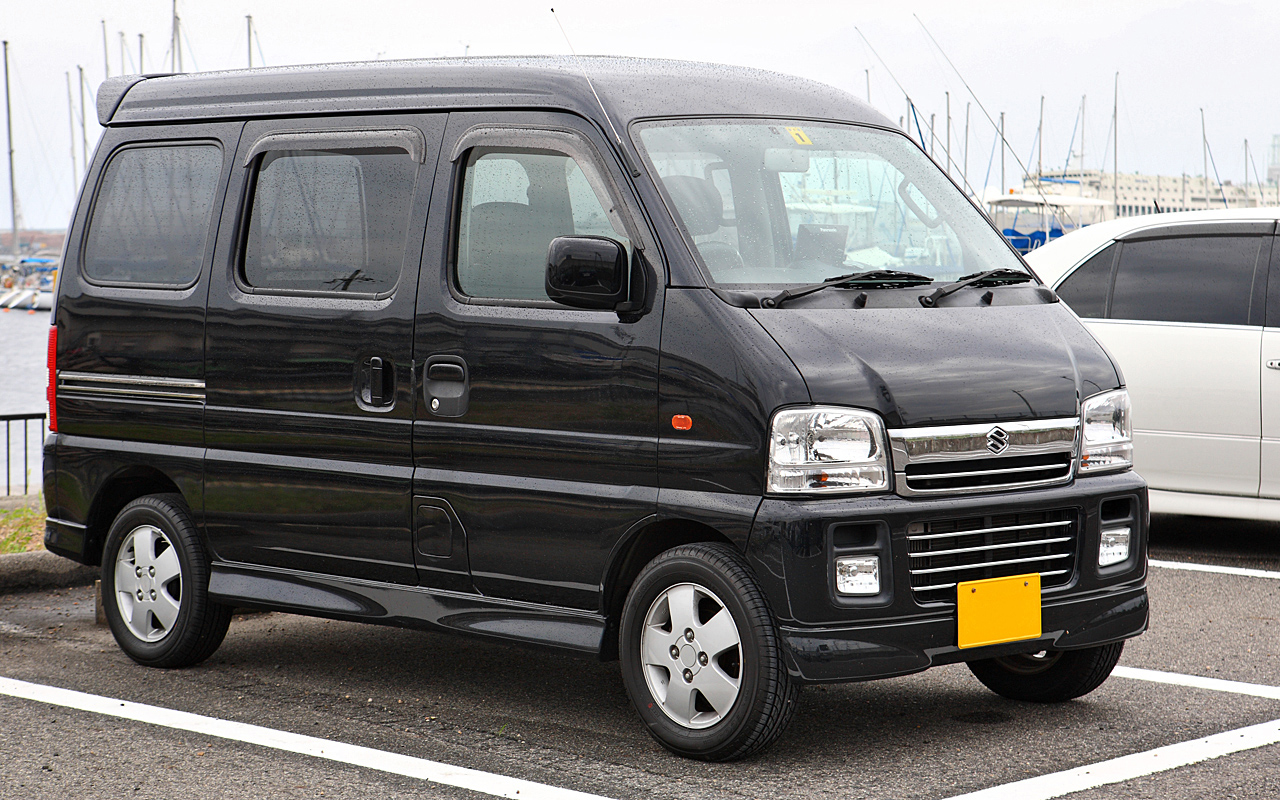
1999–2005 Suzuki Every Wagon

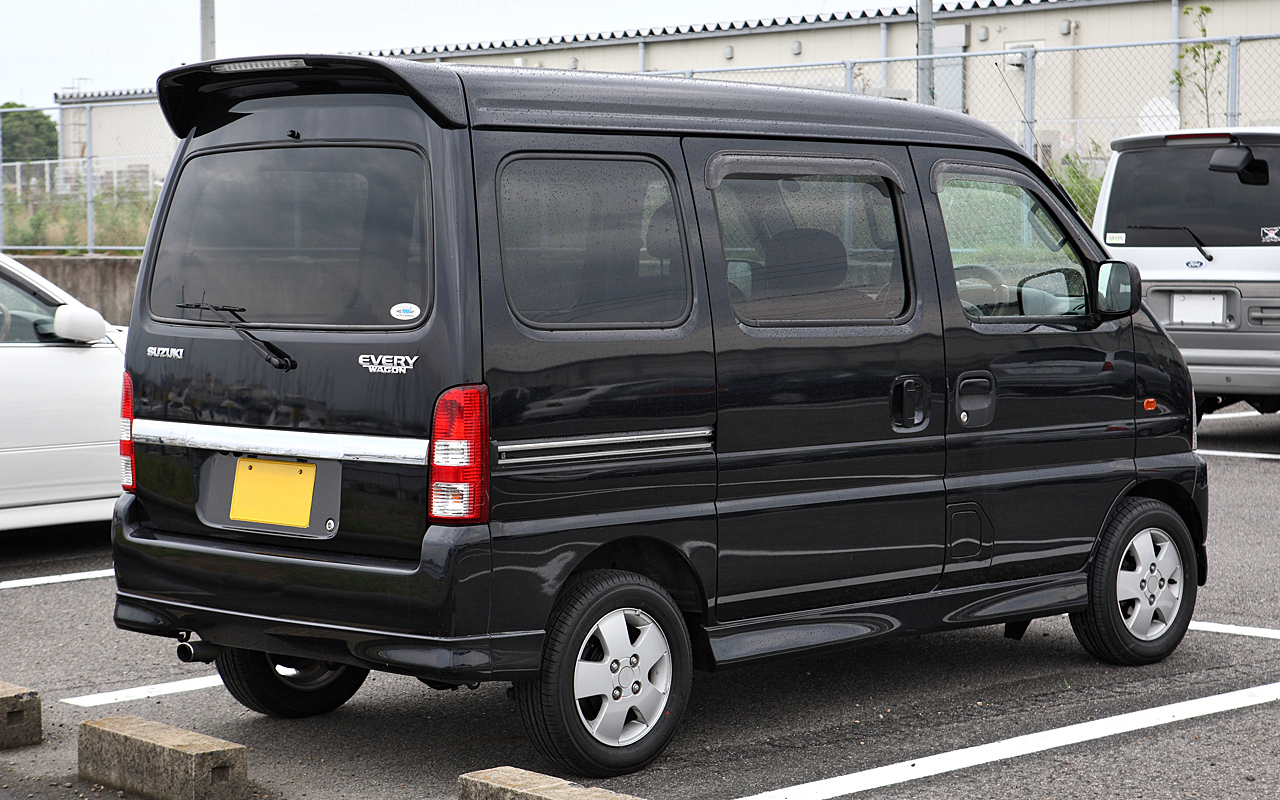
1999–2005 Suzuki Every Wagon

== Fifth generation (DA64; 2005) ==
Fifth generation Every (DA64)
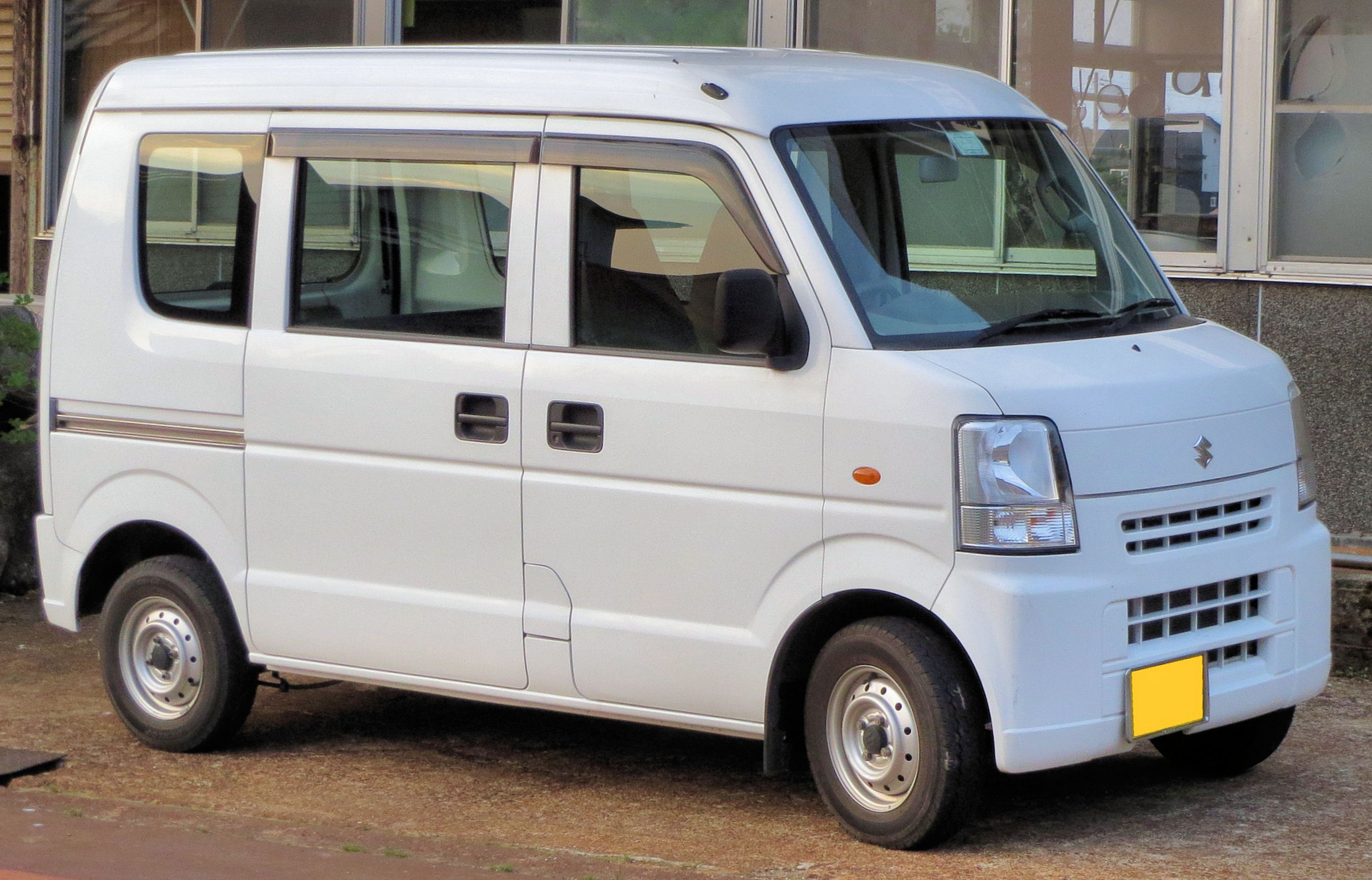
- Suzuki Every PA van (DA64V)

Overview
- Also called: Mazda Scrum; Mitsubishi Minicab Van; Mitsubishi Town Box; Nissan NV100 Clipper/NV100 Clipper Rio
- Production: August 2005–February 2015
- Assembly: Japan: Iwata, Shizuoka

Body and chassis
- Body style: 5-door van/microbus
- Layout: mid-engine, rear-wheel drive / four-wheel drive

Powertrain
- Engine: 657 cc K6A I3; 657 cc K6A turbo I3
- Transmission: 5-speed manual; 3-speed automatic; 4-speed automatic

Dimensions
- Wheelbase: 2,400 mm (94 in)
- Length: 3,395 mm (134 in)
- Width: 1,475 mm (58 in)
- Height: 1,795–1,880 mm (71–74 in)
- Curb weight: 650–780 kg (1,433–1,720 lb)

The fifth generation Every was introduced in Japan in August 2005. Unlike its predecessors, it was primarily designed as a passenger vehicle, with the commercial models derived from the passenger variant. The rear seat of the Every could be moved 150 mm (5.9 in) front-to-rear, allowing for flexibility. The top-of-the-line PZ Turbo and PZ Turbo Special models were the first kei vans to have fully automated climate control (including vent settings and directions). Those two models also had powered sliding doors at the rear, with the PZ Turbo Special being thus equipped on both sides and also including a power step for ease of access. The Every Wagon received a facelift on 20 May 2010.

On 9 July 2007, the Every Van and Wagon received a minor facelift. The PZ turbo model features a redesigned grille.

From 2013 until 2015, the fifth generation Every was rebadged and sold by Mitsubishi Motors as the Minicab and Town Box, and by Nissan as the NV100 Clipper.

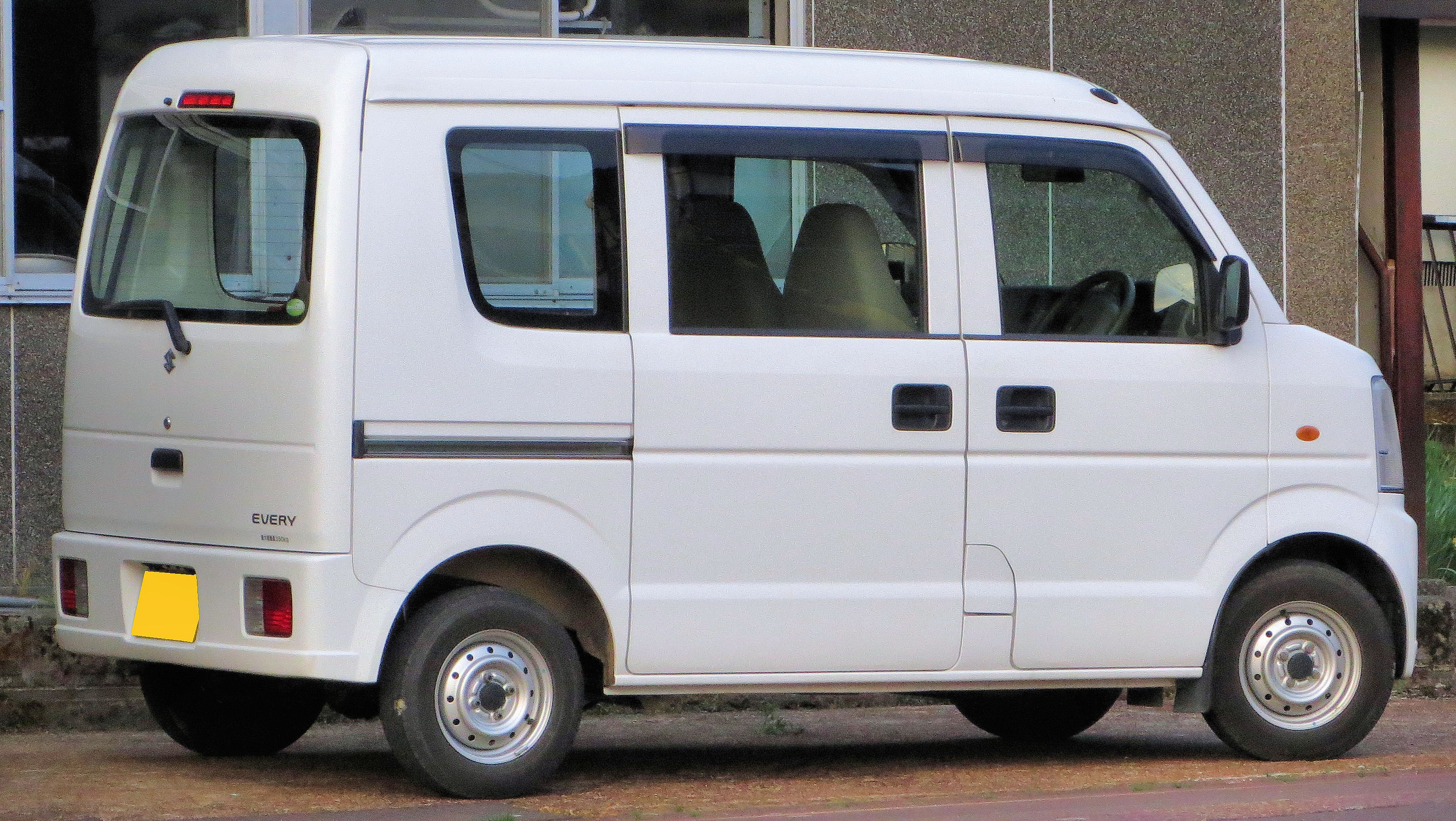
Suzuki Every PA van (DA64V)

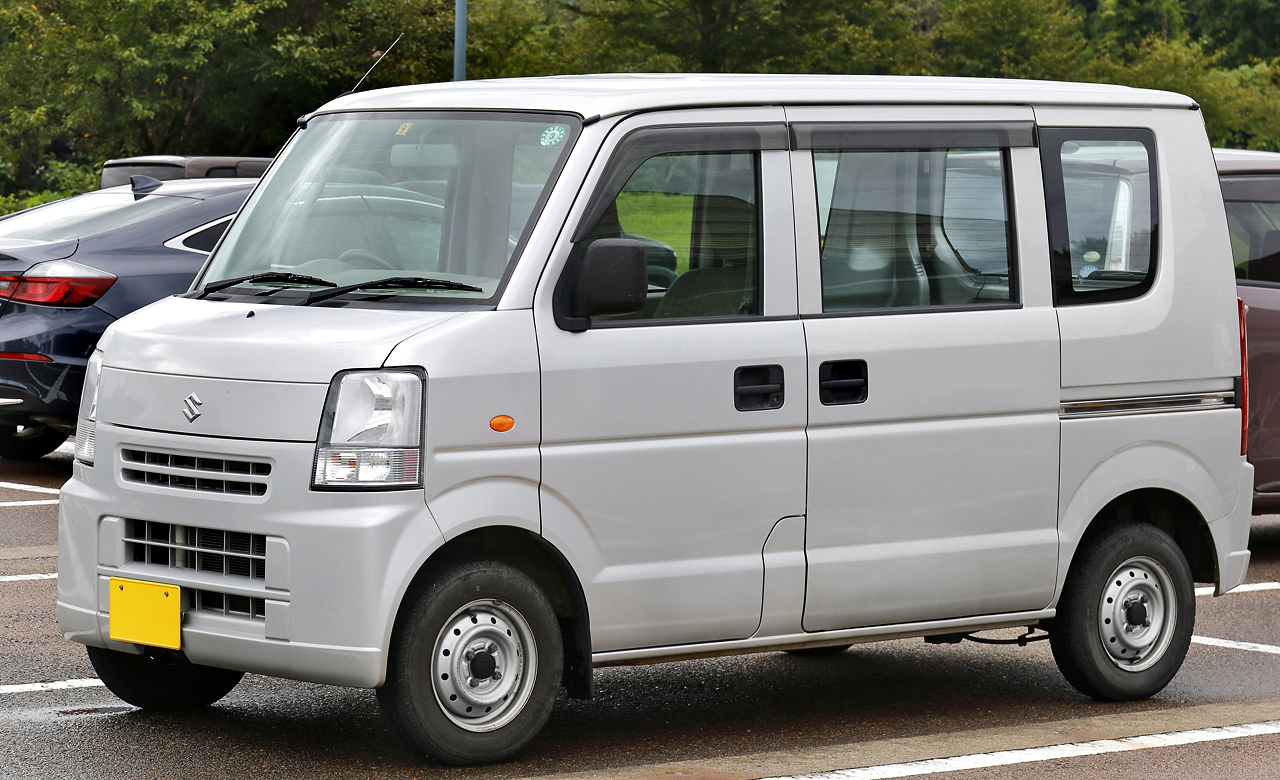
Suzuki Every GA van (DA64V)

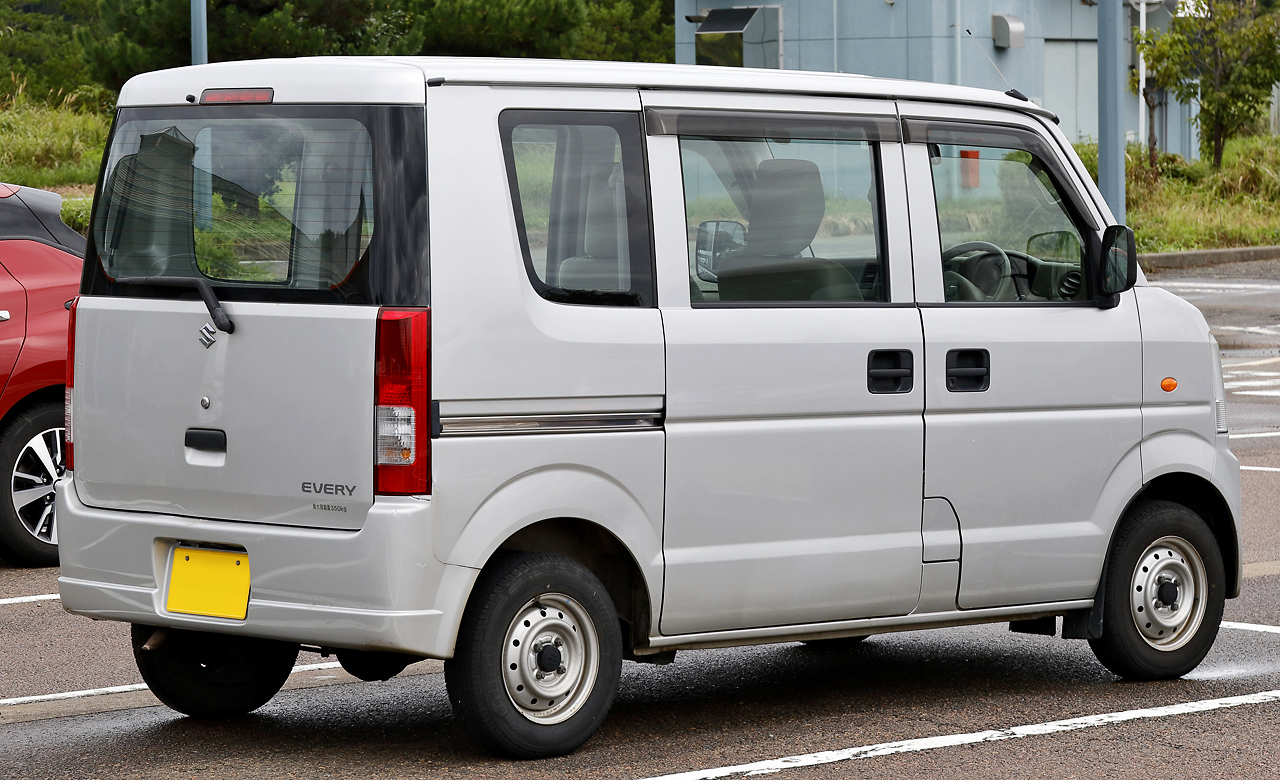
Suzuki Every GA van (DA64V)

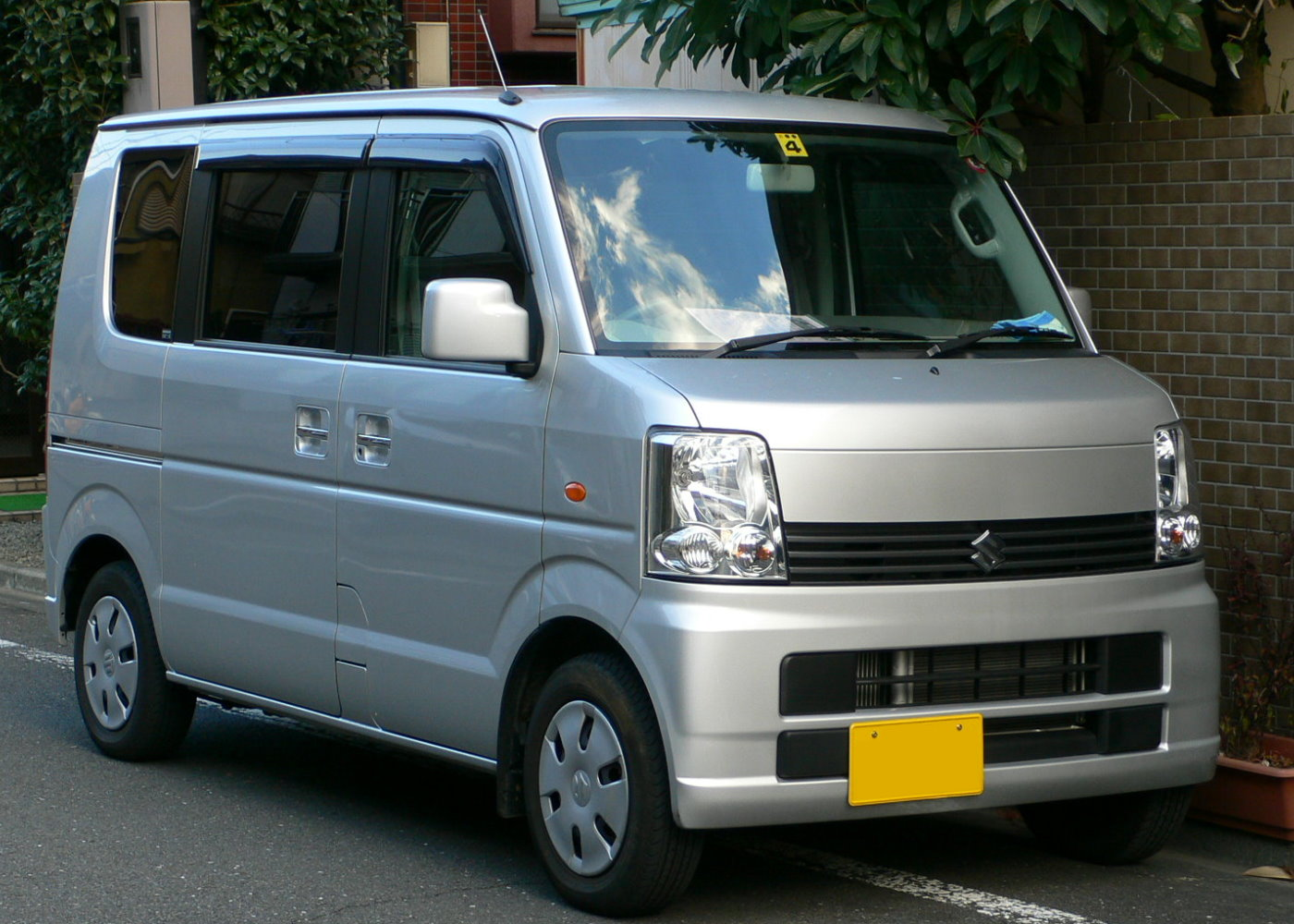
2005 Suzuki Every Wagon JP (pre-facelift)

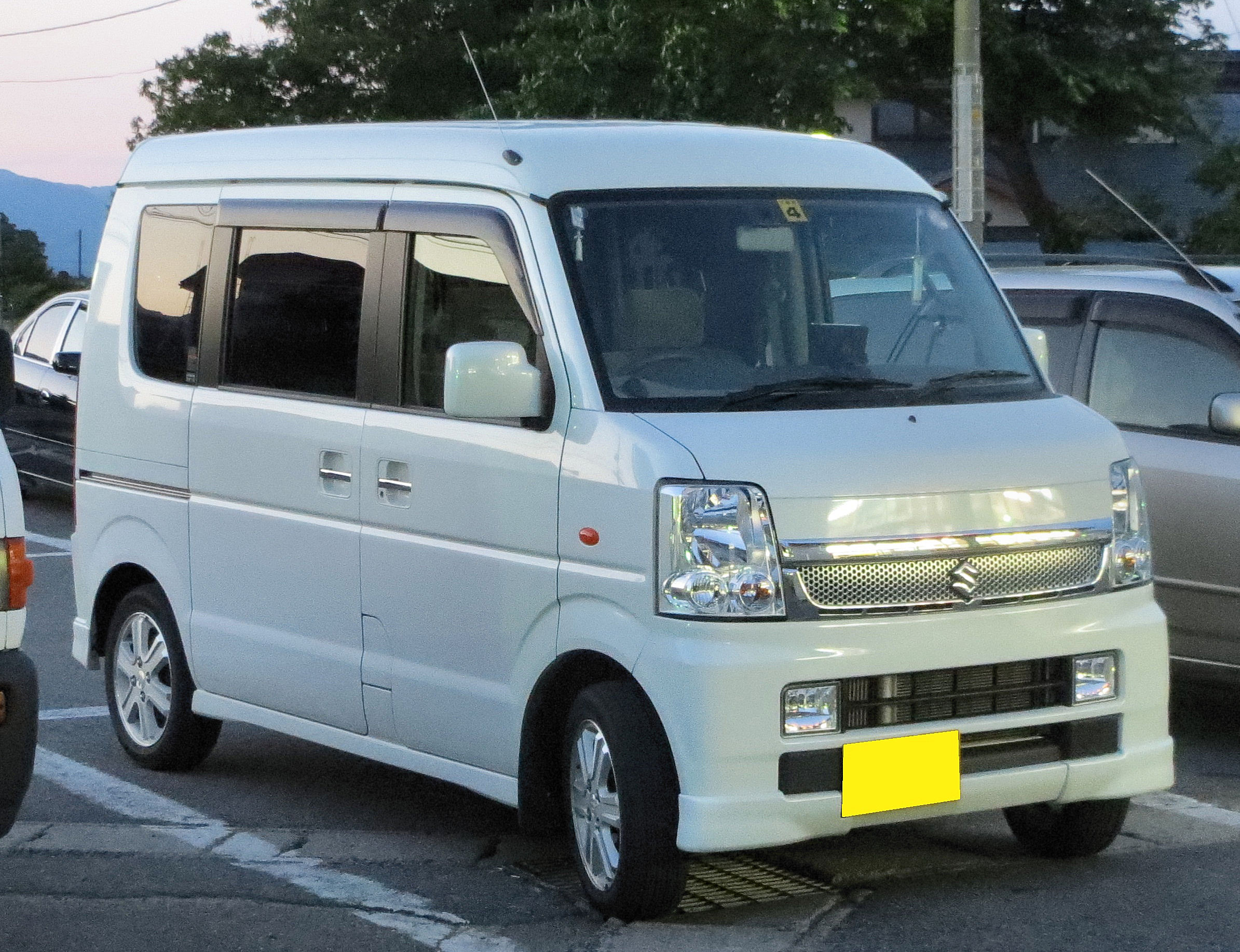
Suzuki Every Wagon PZ Turbo Special Hi-Roof 4WD (pre-facelift)

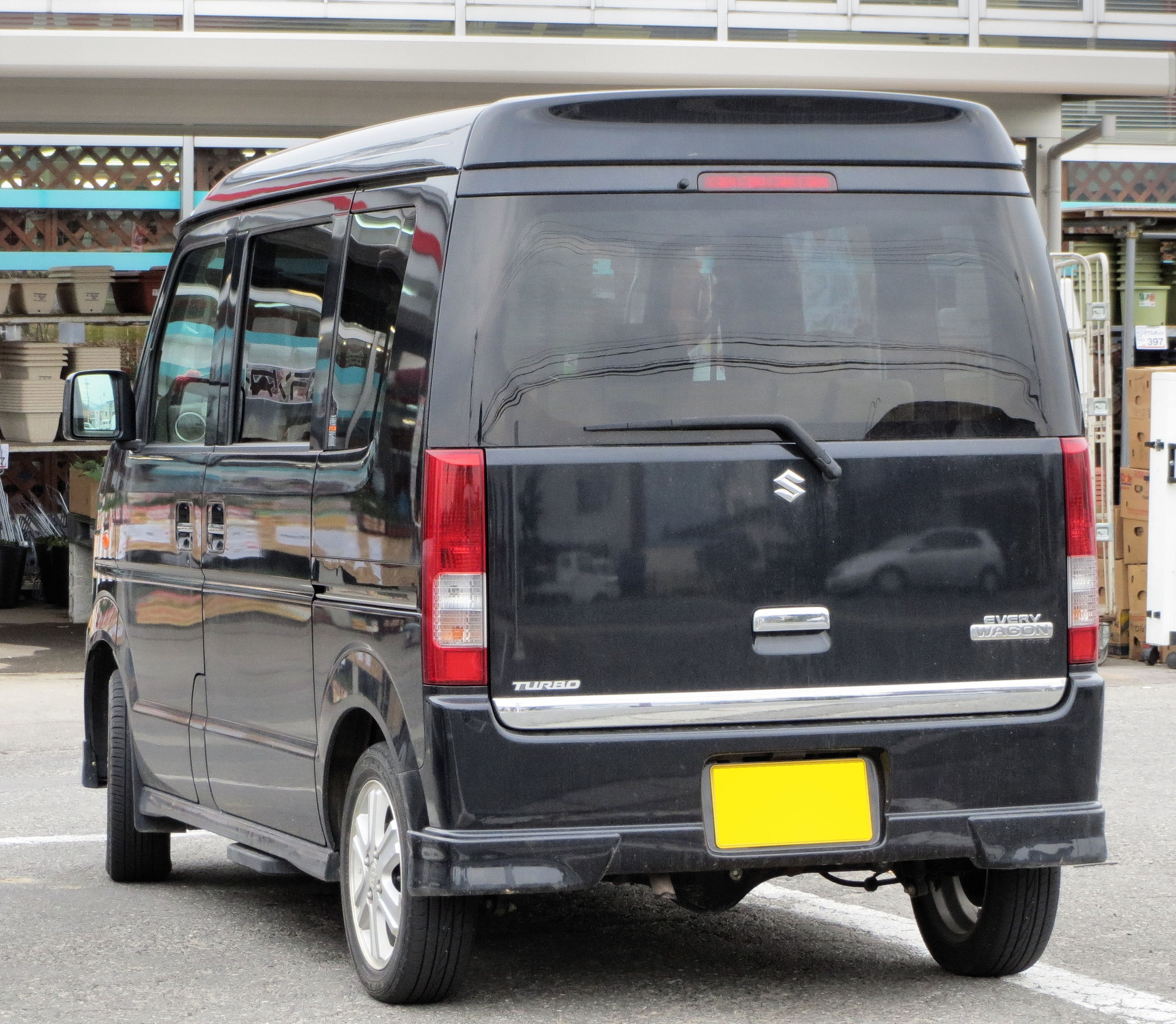
Suzuki Every Wagon PZ Turbo Special Hi-Roof 4WD (pre-facelift)

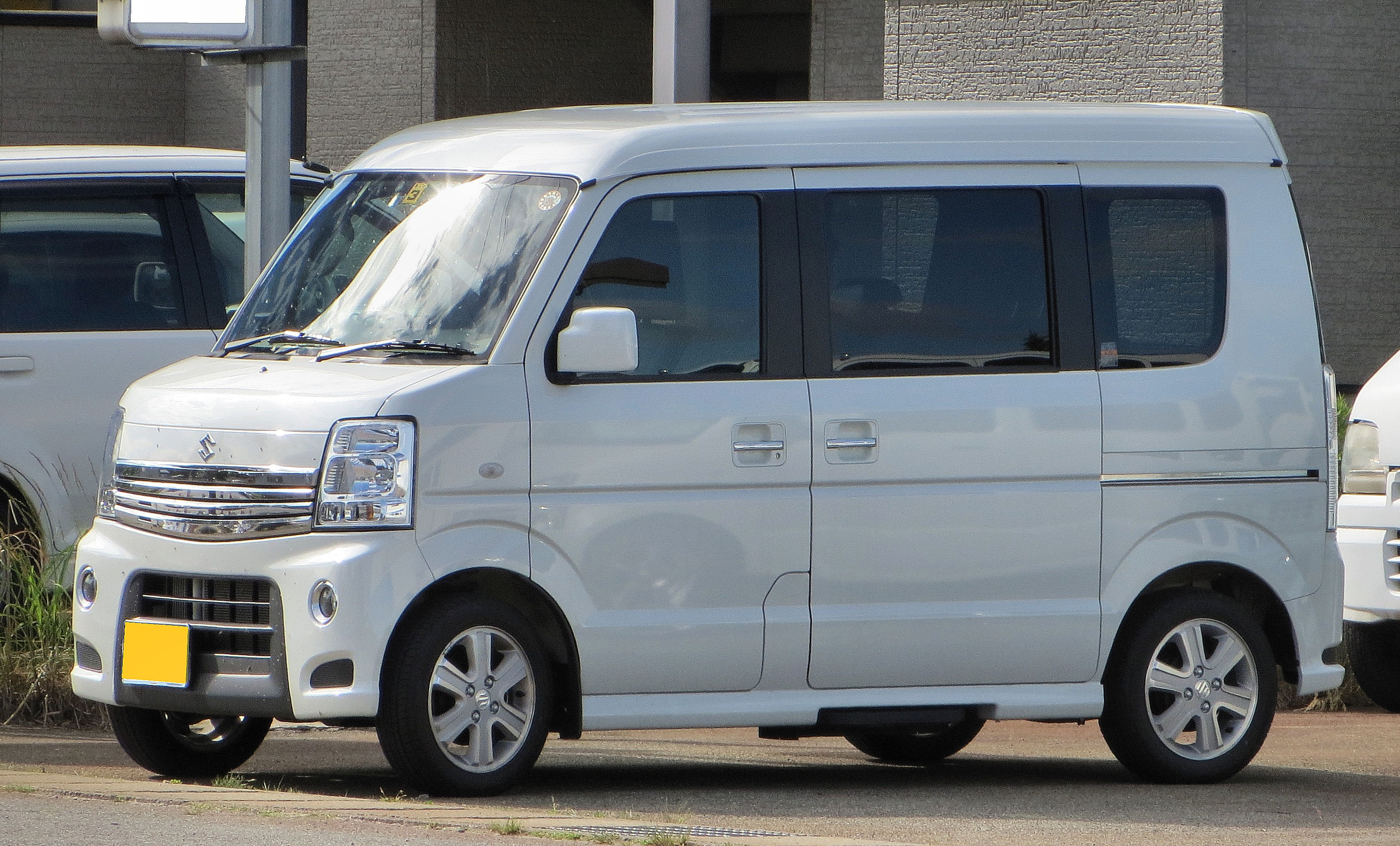
Suzuki Every Wagon PZ Turbo Special Hi-Roof 4WD (facelift)

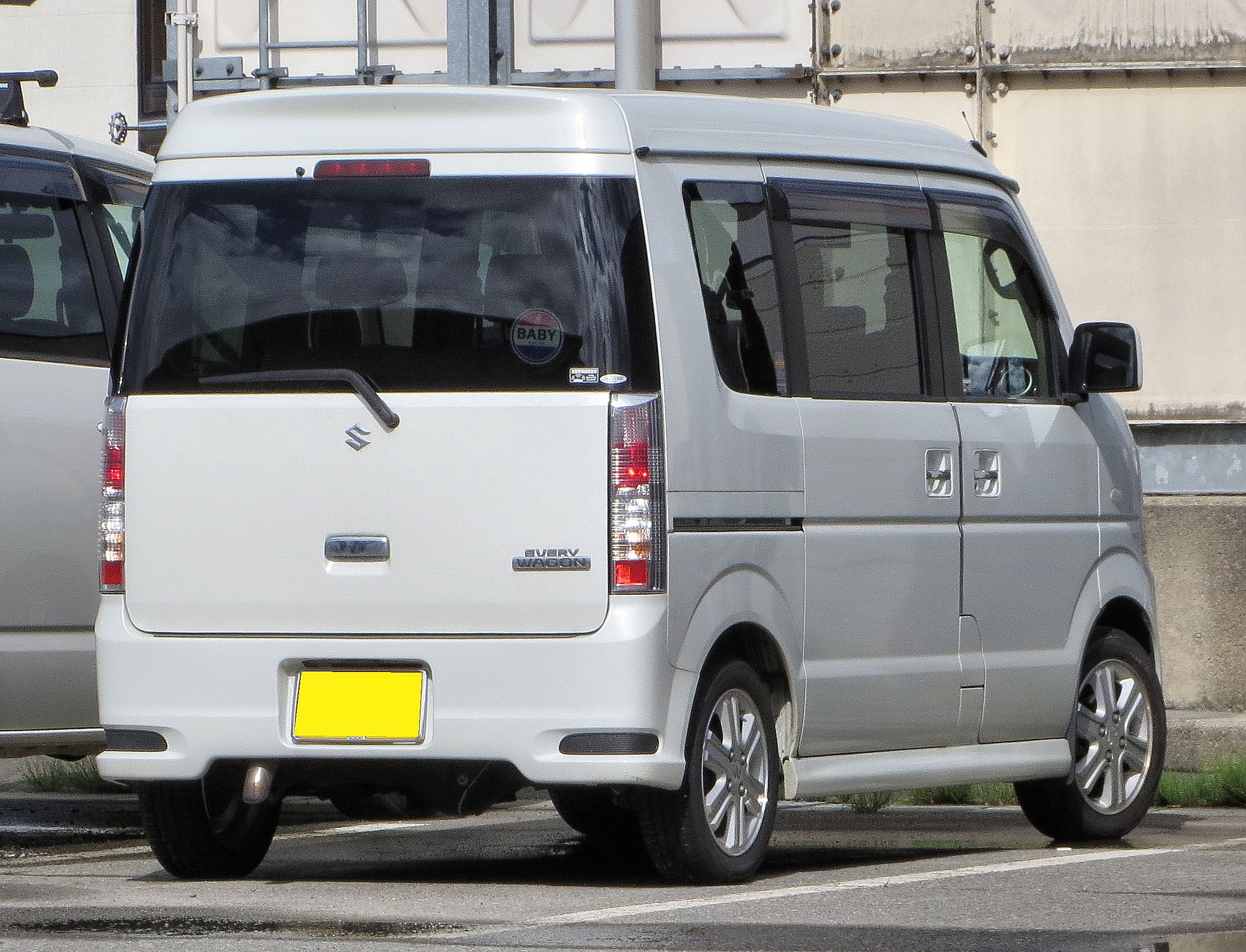
Suzuki Every Wagon PZ Turbo Special Hi-Roof 4WD (facelift)

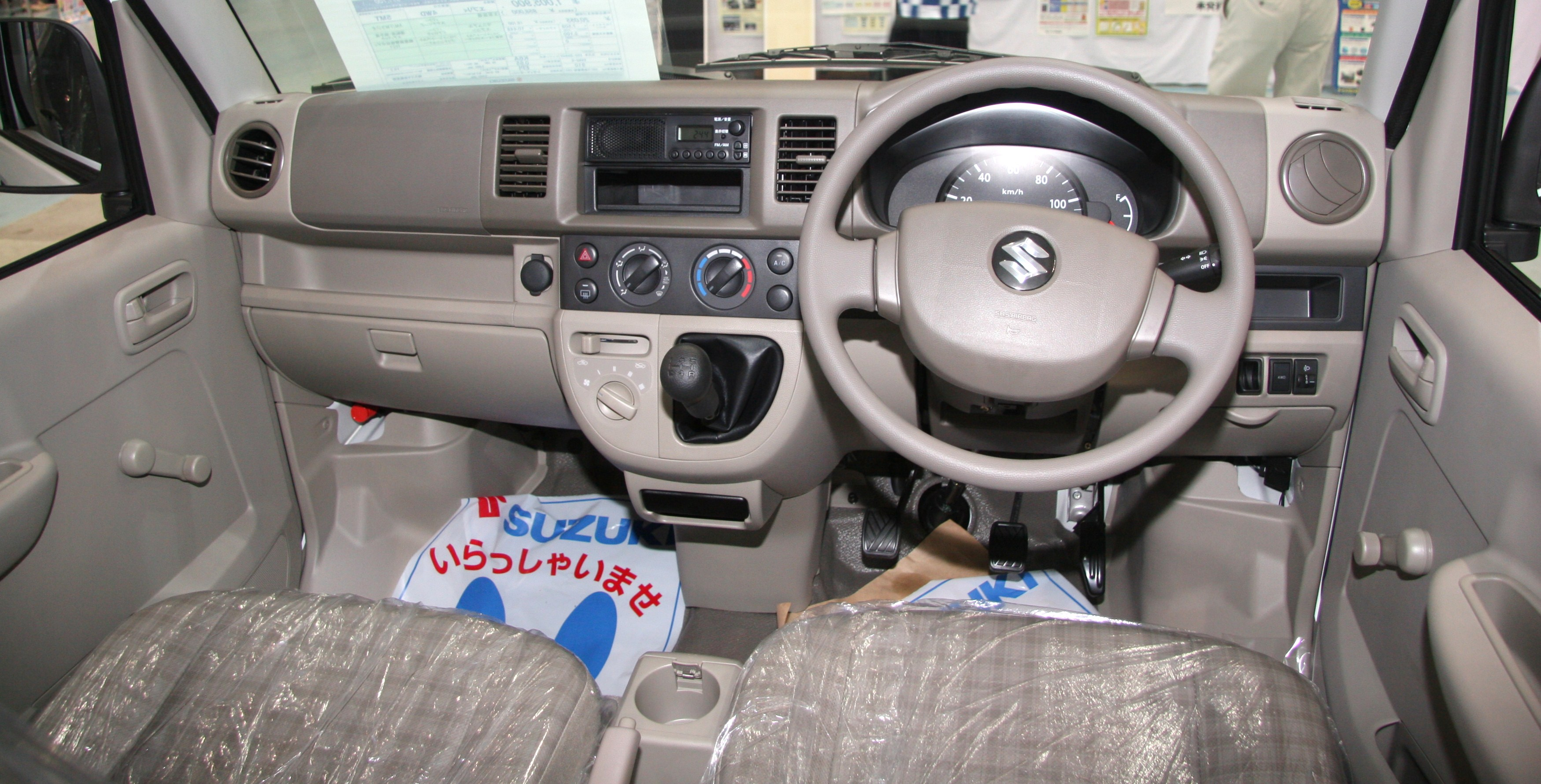
2010 Suzuki Every PA interior with manual transmission

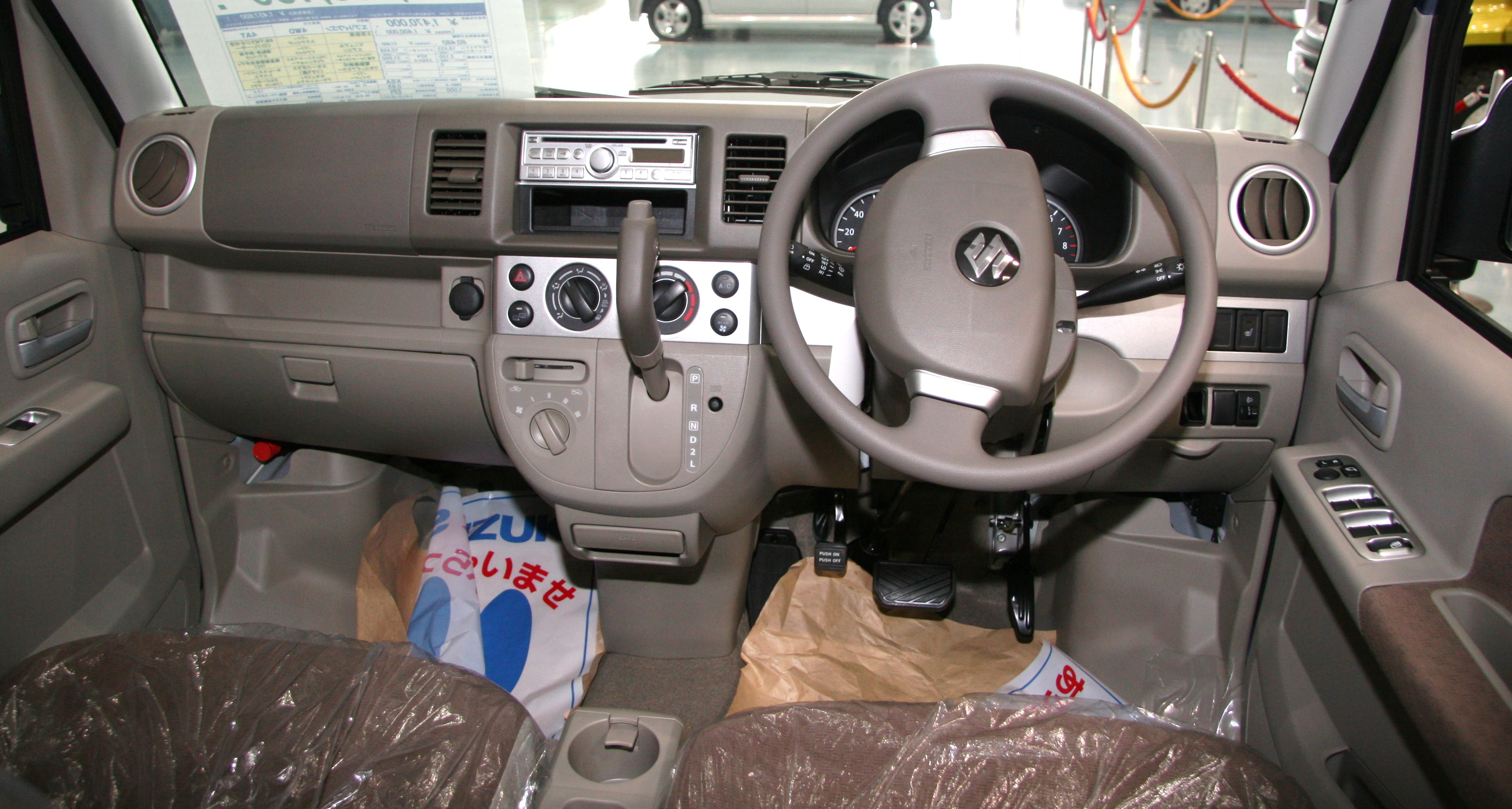
2010 Suzuki Every Wagon JP Turbo interior with automatic transmission

== Sixth generation (DA17/DA18; 2015) ==
Sixth generation Every (DA17/DA18)
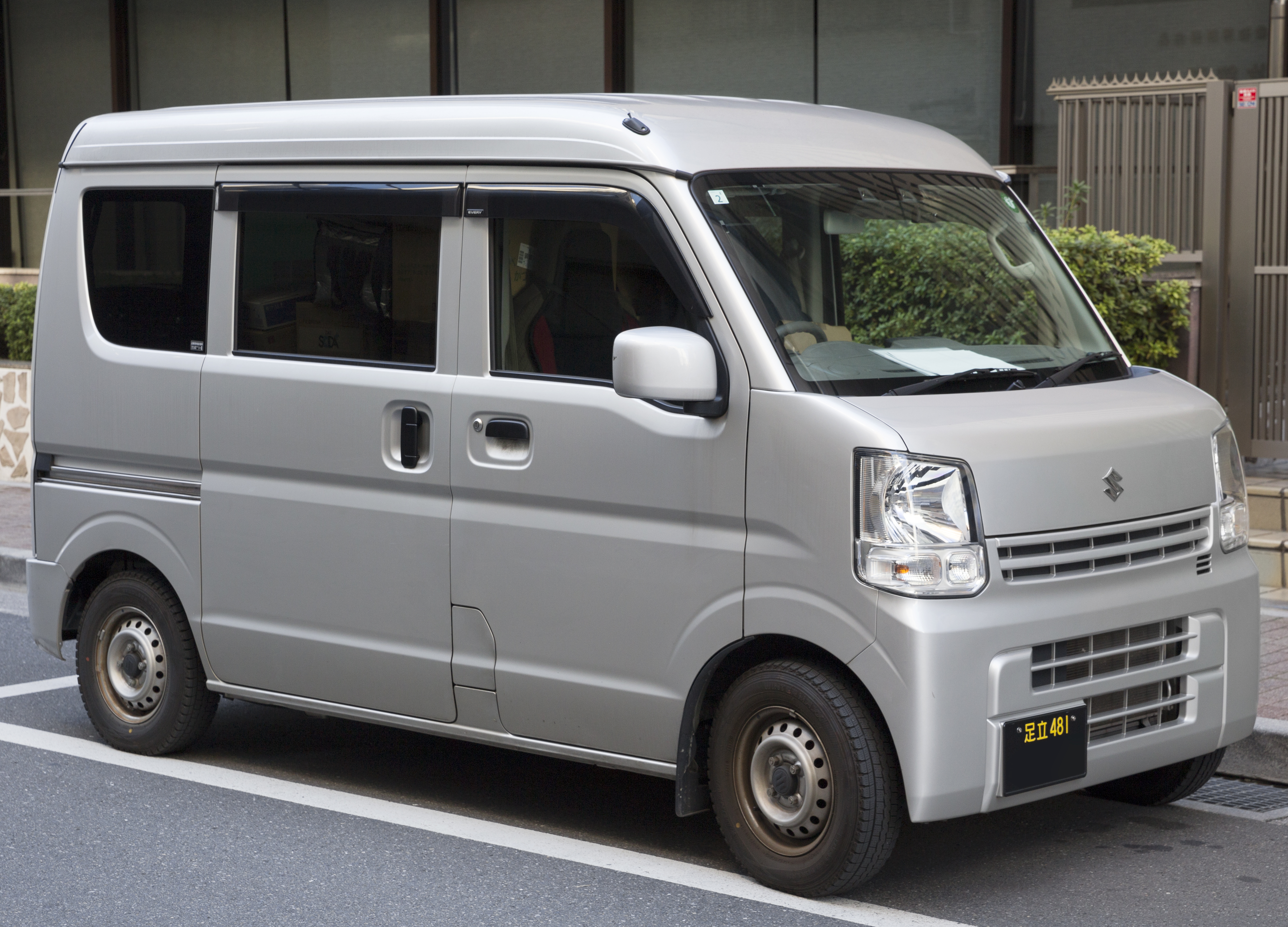
- Suzuki Every PC Limited van (DA17V)

Overview
- Also called: Mazda Scrum; Mitsubishi Minicab Van; Mitsubishi Town Box; Nissan NV100 Clipper/NV100 Clipper Rio (2015–2024); Nissan Clipper Van/Rio (2024–present)
- Production: 2015–present (Japan); 2024–present (Pakistan)
- Assembly: Japan: Iwata, Shizuoka; Pakistan: Karachi (Pak Suzuki)

Body and chassis
- Body style: 5-door van/microbus
- Layout: Mid-engine, rear-wheel drive / four-wheel drive

Powertrain
- Engine: 658 cc R06A I3; 658 cc R06A turbo I3
- Transmission: 5-speed manual; 4-speed automatic; 5-speed AMT (2015–2024); CVT (2024–present)

Dimensions
- Wheelbase: 2,430 mm (96 in)
- Length: 3,395 mm (134 in)
- Width: 1,475 mm (58 in)
- Height: 1,815–1,910 mm (71–75 in)
- Curb weight: 870–1,030 kg (1,918–2,271 lb)

Chronology
- Predecessor: Suzuki Bolan (Pakistan)

The sixth generation Every was introduced in Japan in February 2015, using the new R06A engine as per its Carry truck sibling. The sixth generation largely retaining from the fifth generation design elements, like headlights and rear lamps but the dimension slightly enlarged. A wheel-chair access version also available in both wagon and van models. Like previous generations, it was offered in low-roof and high roof models.

It was announced that the car had won the 2015 Good Design Award. The car received the award along with the eight generation Alto, the third generation Alto Lapin, the SX4 S-CROSS, and the fourth generation Solio.

In February 2024, the CVT transmission option was added, replaced the 5-speed AMT. The LED headlights are applied as standard for all Every Wagon models and Every Van PC and JOIN grades. All Every Wagon models have a CVT transmission.

In October 2024, the sixth generation Every entered production in Pakistan as the replacement to the Suzuki Bolan.

The crossover style Every Van, J Limited variant was also released in August 2025.

A major facelift were occurred in May 2026. These changes include: redesigned front grill, which the Every features striped grille, while Every Wagon features patterned grille, both grilles are painted black. The speedometer now uses a TFT model and LED headlights are applied as standard on all models. The platform was changed to DA18.

The sixth-generation Every was launched in Brunei on 27 August 2026, as a fully imported vehicle for the Bruneian market is sourced from the Pakistan, the model was offered in the sole variant: VXR with the 5-speed manual transmission.

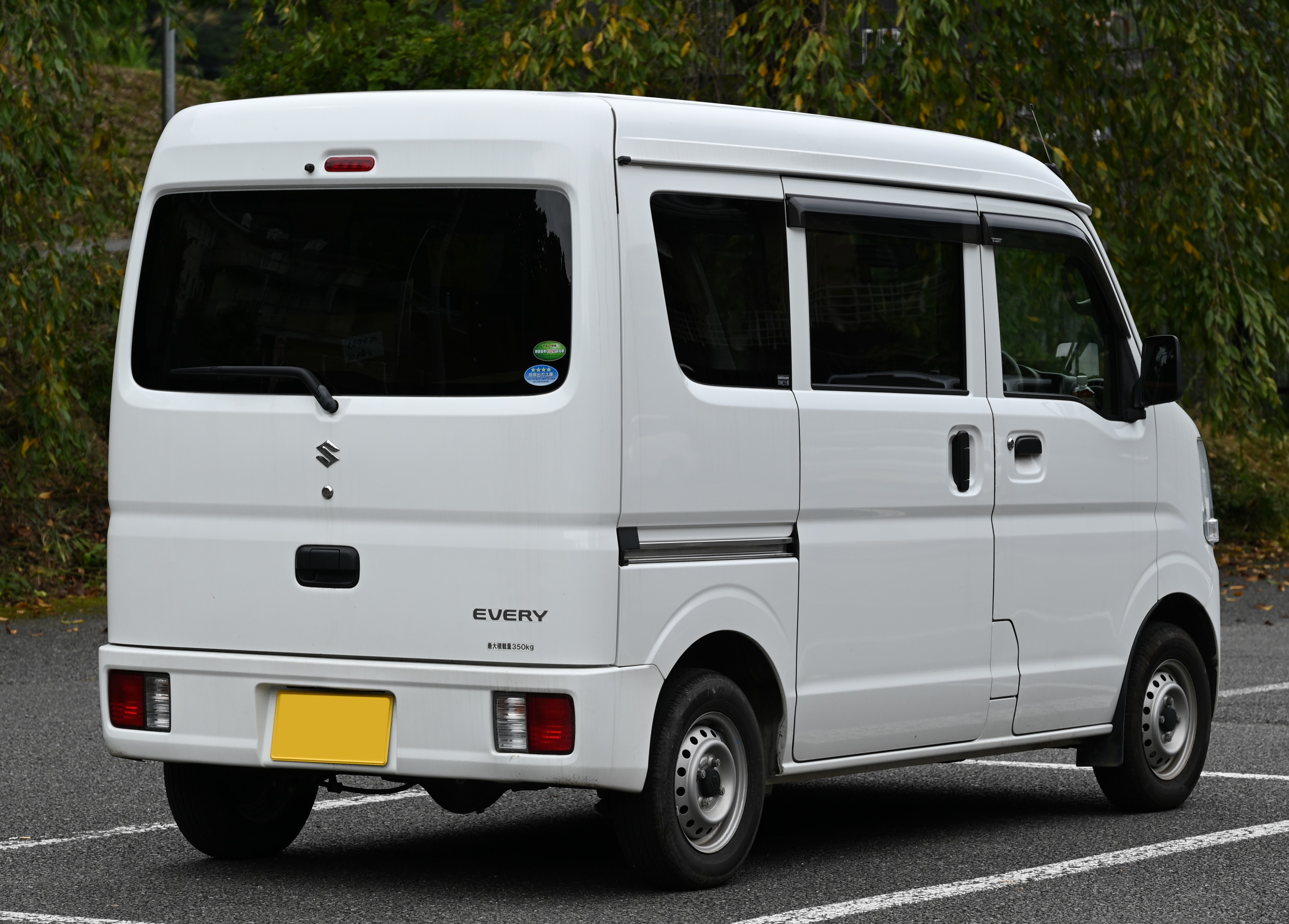
Suzuki Every PA Limited van (DA17V)

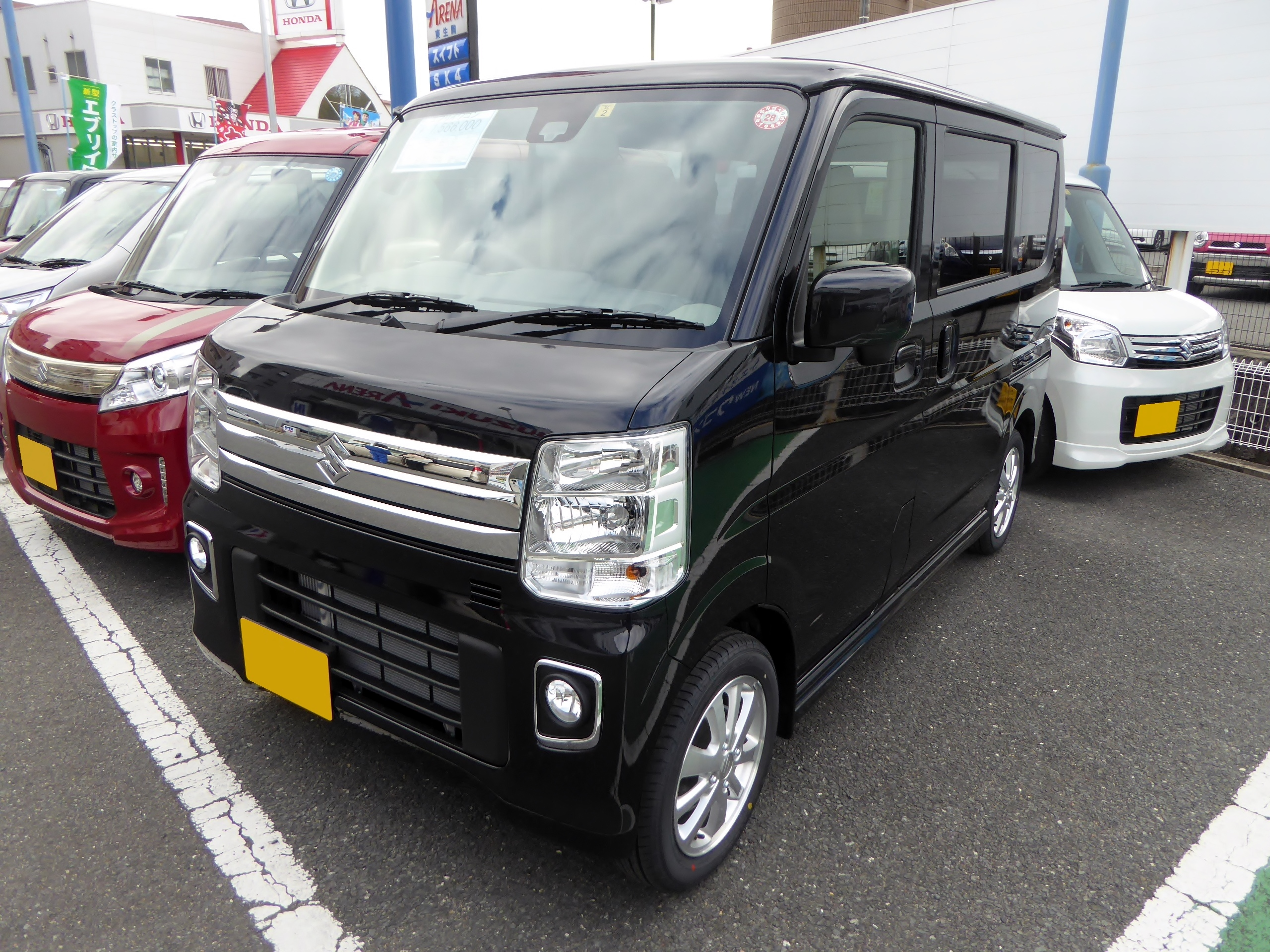
Suzuki Every Wagon PZ Turbo (DA17W)

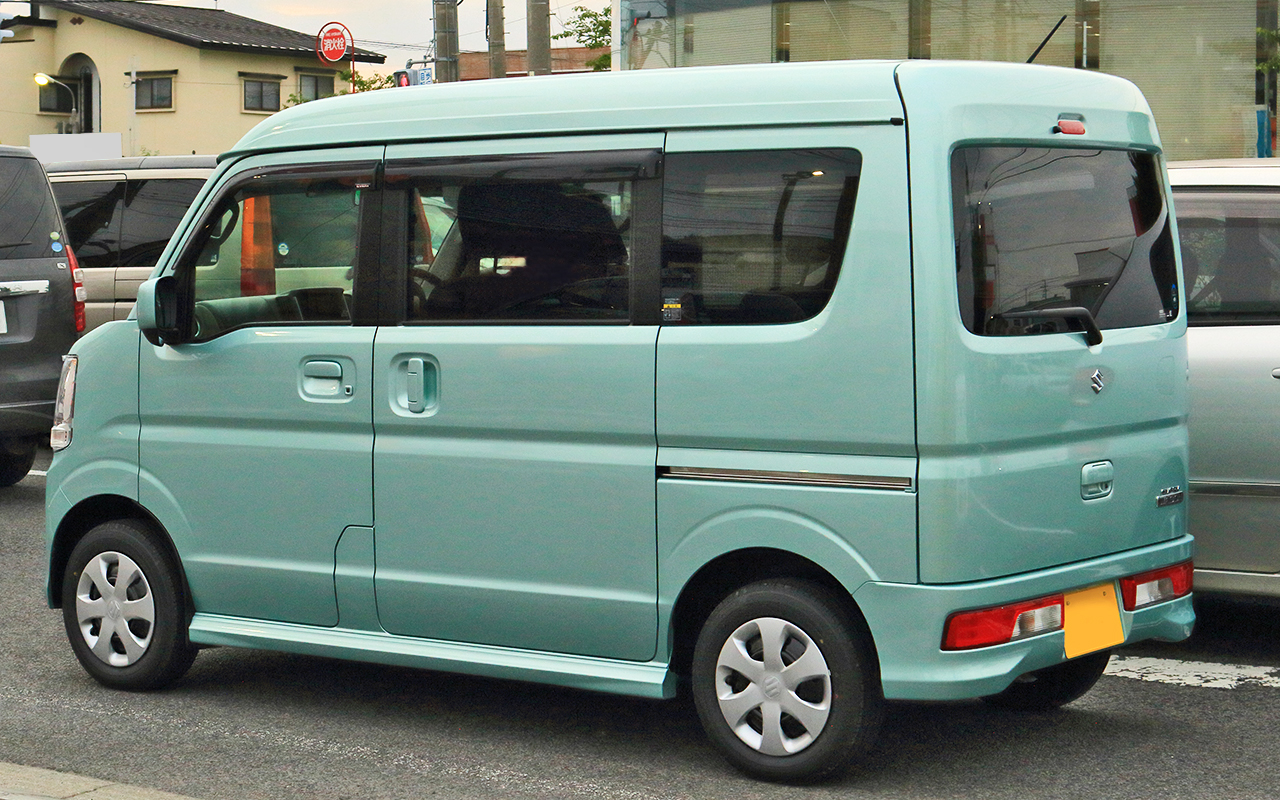
Suzuki Every Wagon JP Turbo (DA17W)

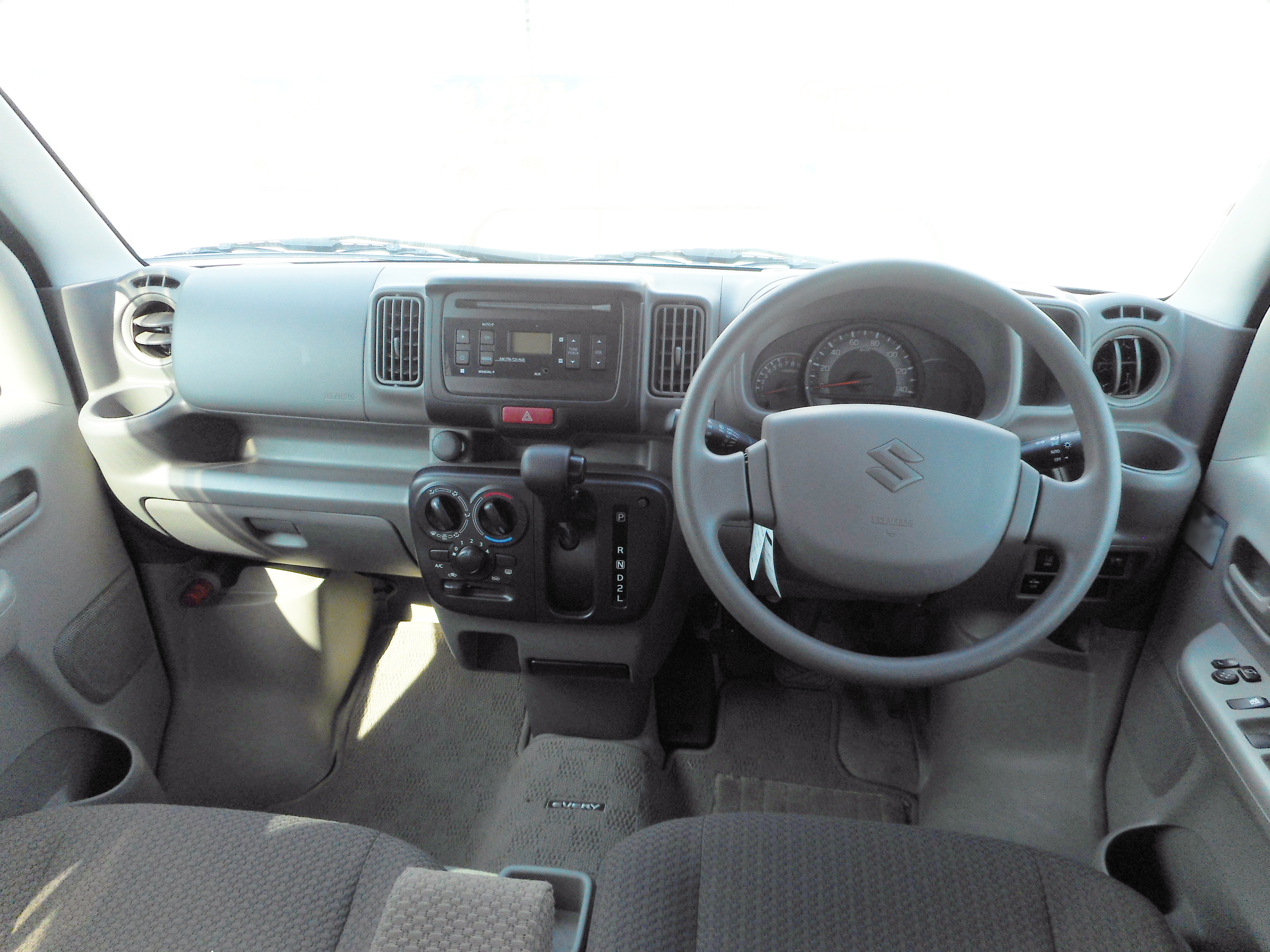
Interior

== Separated models ==
=== Suzuki Every Landy ===
Suzuki Every Landy
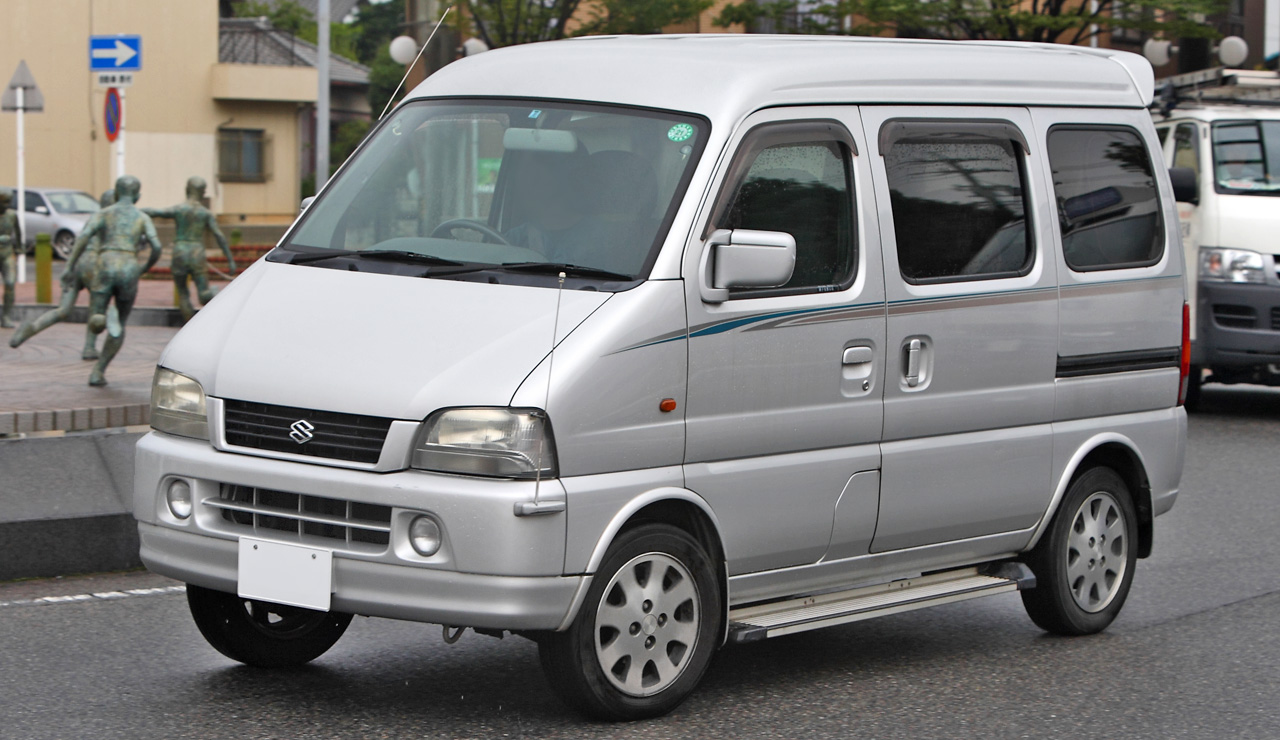
- 1999 Suzuki Every Plus (Japan)

Overview
- Manufacturer: Suzuki; Maruti Suzuki; Ford Lio Ho; Changhe; Karry; Dongfeng Automobile Company
- Also called: Suzuki Every Plus (Japan; 1999–2001); Suzuki E-RV (Malaysia); Suzuki Mastervan (Chile); Maruti Suzuki Versa/Eeco; Chang'an SC6350/SC6371A/SC6390 LWB (Chana Star); Changhe Suzuki Landy/Coolcar
- Production: 1999–present (China); 1999–2005 (Japan); 2001–2010 (India, Versa); 2010–present (India, Eeco)
- Assembly: Iwata, Shizuoka, Japan; Gurgaon, India; Chongqing, China

Body and chassis
- Class: Microvan; Truck (China and Taiwan only)
- Body style: 5-door minivan 5-door panel van 2-door pickup truck
- Layout: Front mid-engine, rear-wheel-drive or all-wheel drive

Powertrain
- Engine: 1298 cc G13BB SOHC I4
- Transmission: 5-speed manual 4-speed automatic

Dimensions
- Wheelbase: 2,350–2,365 mm (92.5–93.1 in)
- Length: 3,675–3,705 mm (144.7–145.9 in)
- Width: 1,475–1,505 mm (58.1–59.3 in)
- Height: 1,780–1,900 mm (70.1–74.8 in)
- Curb weight: 785–1,080 kg (1,731–2,381 lb)

Chronology
- Successor: Suzuki APV (International); Suzuki Landy (Japan)

The Every+ (Every Plus), was an enlarged seven-seat MPV version of the Every (passenger version of the Carry). With chassis code DA32W It was fitted with the considerably larger 1.3 liter G13 engine.

With Carry 1.3 badging (chassis DA32) Truck and Van versions of the Every Plus were sold in various right hand drive export markets, including the United Kingdom and Australia. The truck version was available with constant four-wheel drive. The Wagon model was also sold as the Suzuki E-RV in Malaysia. It was also sold in certain other markets, such as Chile, as the Carry SK413 (truck) or as the Mastervan (van).

The name was changed in May 2001 to Every Landy, accompanied by a facelift introducing a redesigned front fascia.

Production ceased in July 2005, coinciding with the generation change of the Every.

- Weight:
  - 2WD: 785–1,040 kg (1,731–2,293 lb)
  - 4WD: 1,050–1,080 kg (2,310–2,380 lb)
- Maximum power: 78–86 PS (57–63 kW) at 5,700 to 6,000 rpm
- Maximum torque: 101–115 N⋅m (74–85 lbf⋅ft) at 3,000 rpm
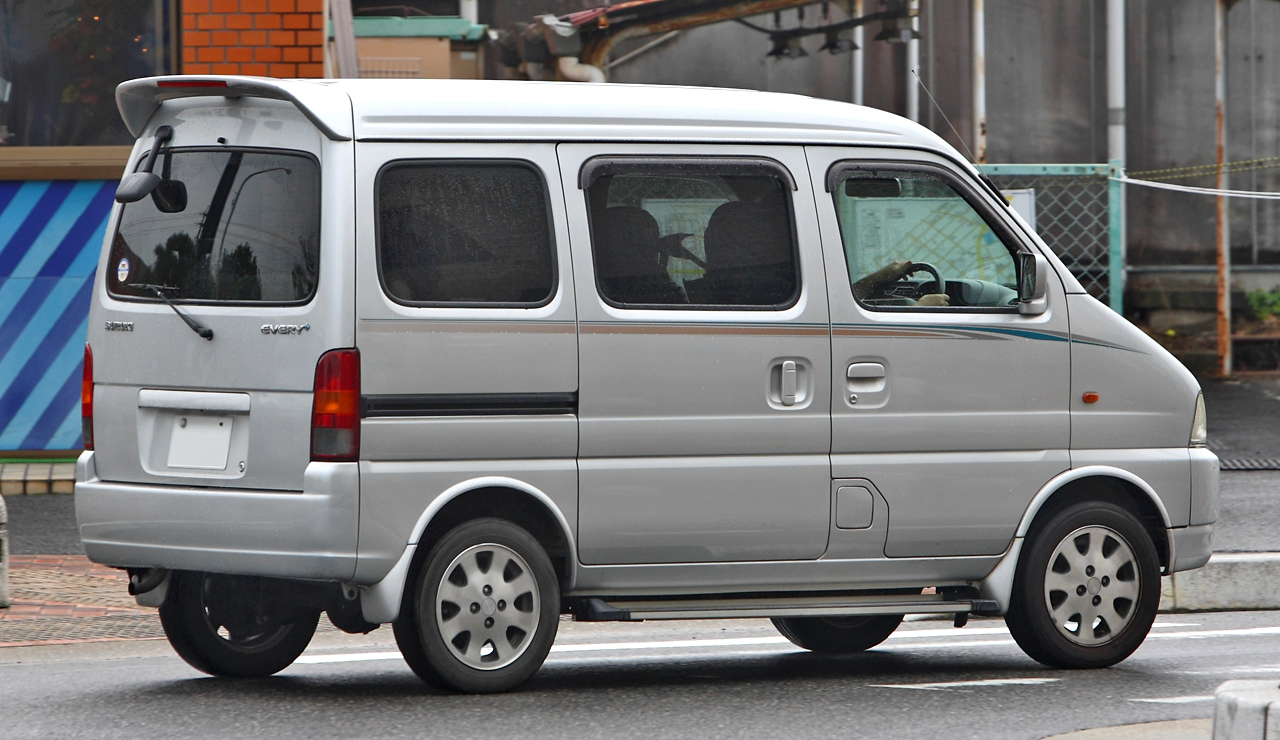
Suzuki Every Plus (Japan)

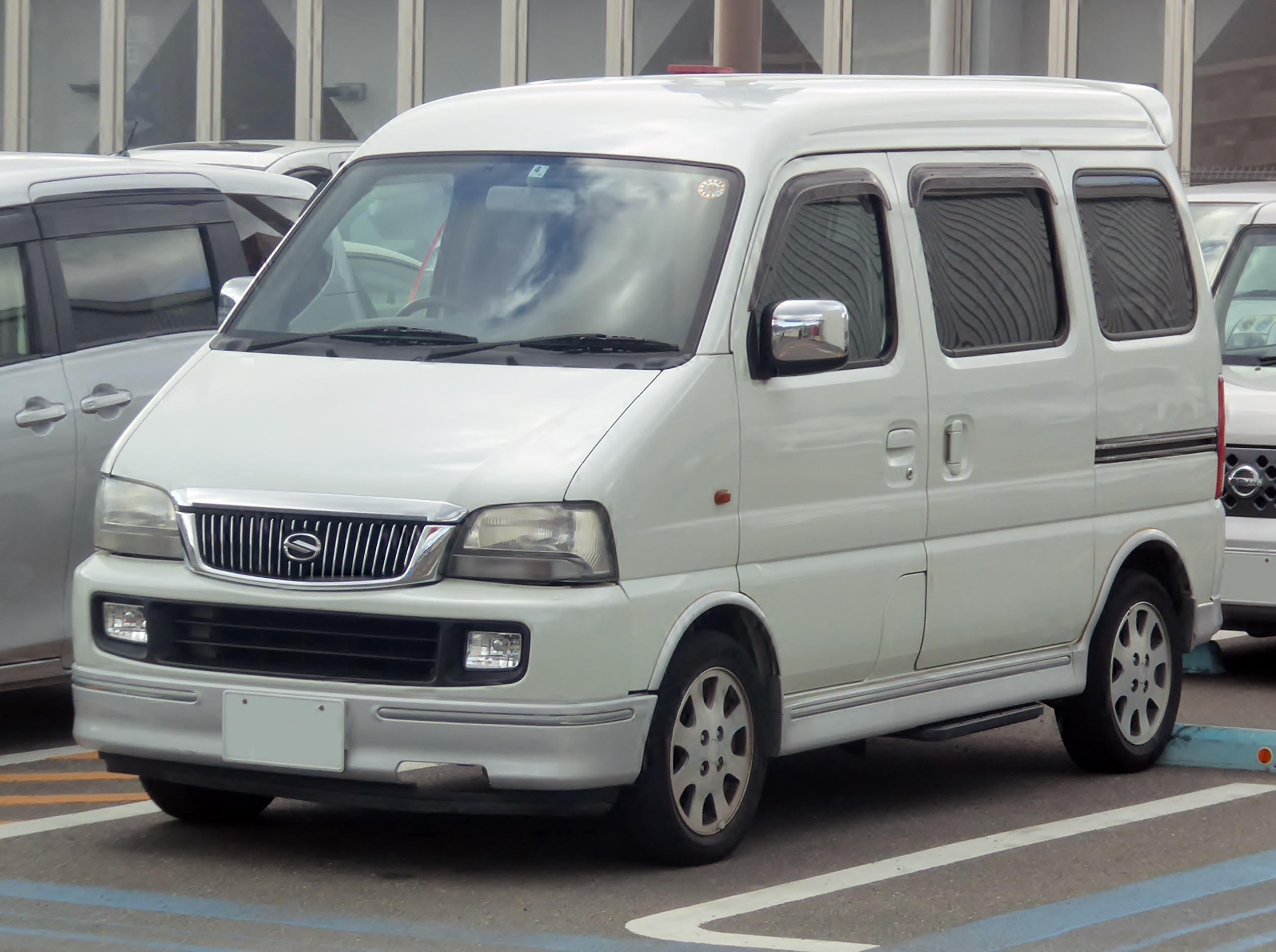
Suzuki Every Landy (Japan)

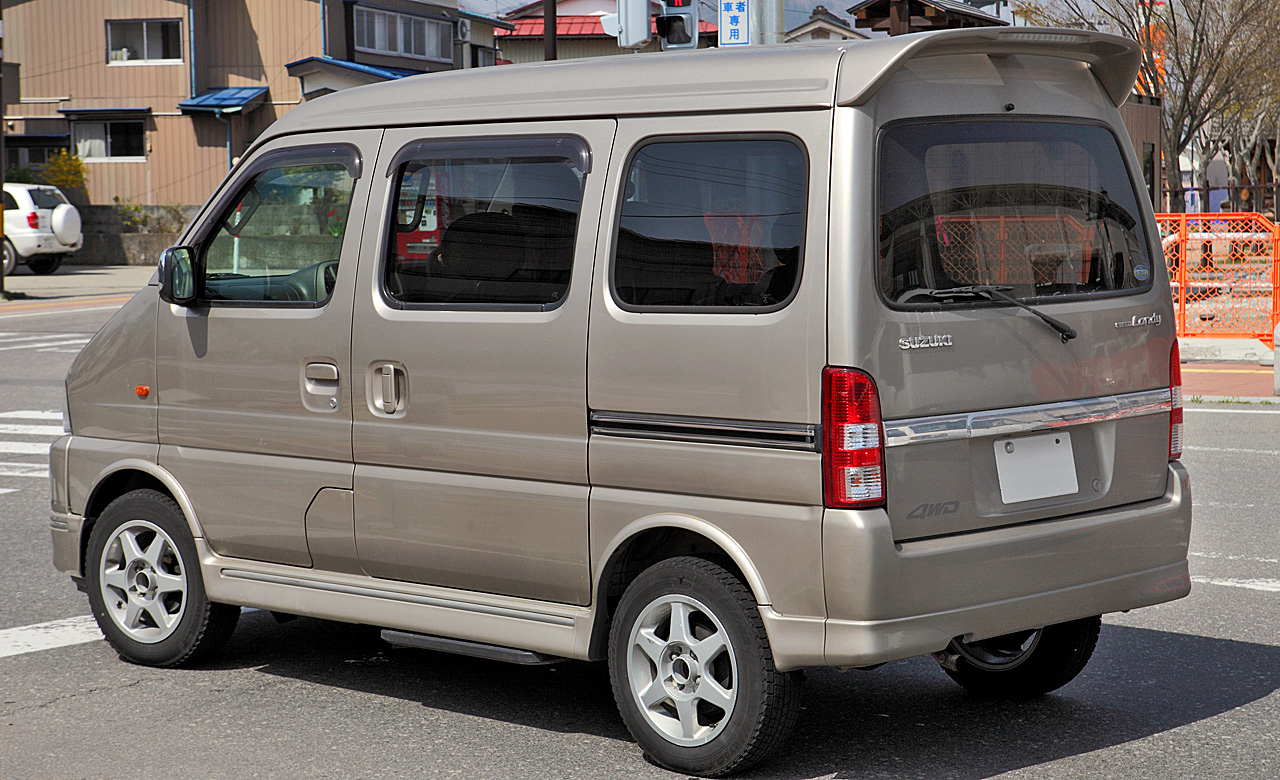
Suzuki Every Landy (Japan)

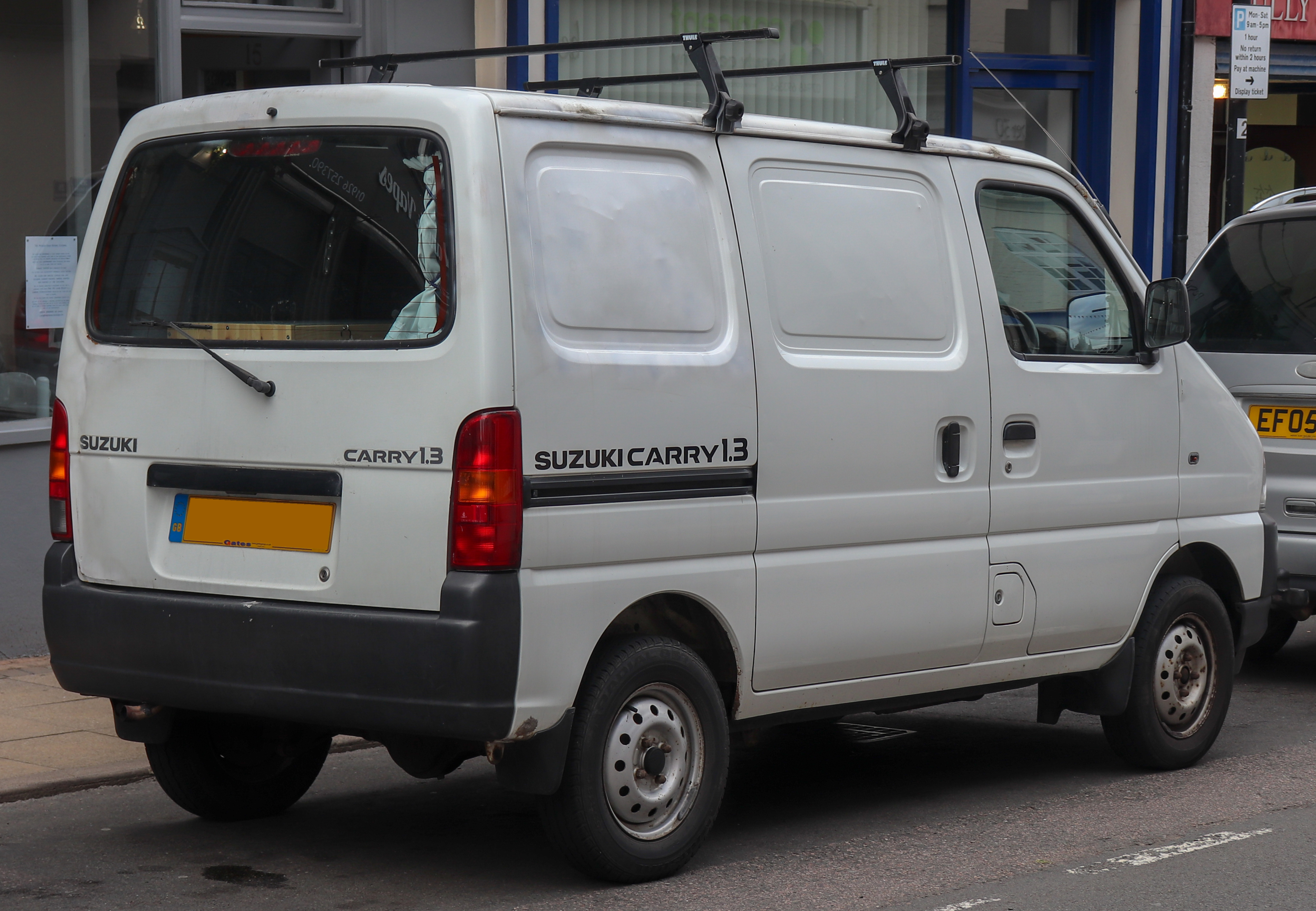
2003 Suzuki Carry 1.3 panel van (UK)

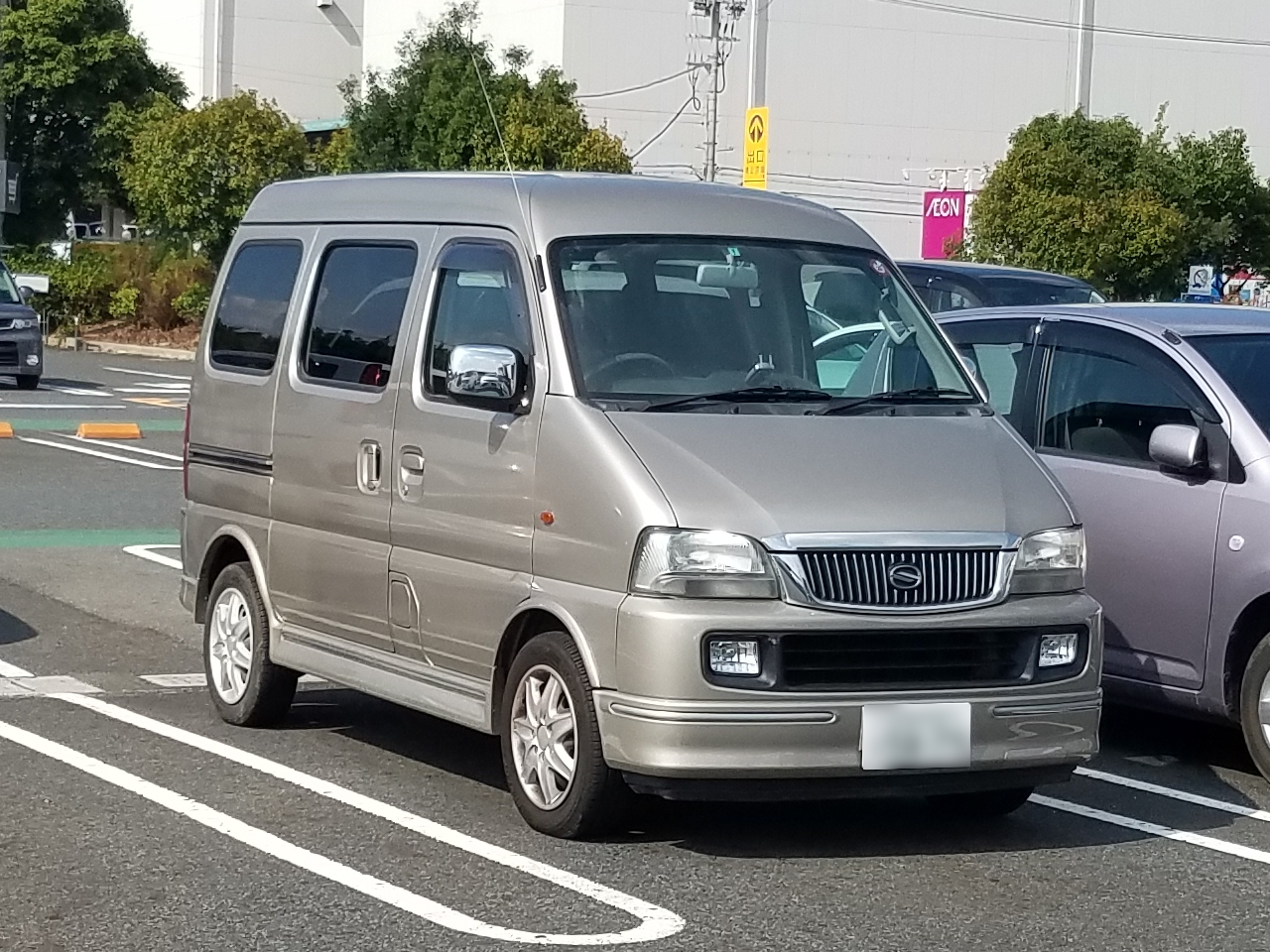
Every Landy XL

Maruti Suzuki Versa/Eeco

The Maruti Suzuki Versa is a licensed variation of the Every Plus for the Indian market and was built by Maruti Suzuki from October 2001. It is the second van released by Maruti Suzuki since the Maruti Suzuki Omni was released in 1984. About seventy percent of the vehicle components are made within India. The Versa was discontinued in late 2009, after only having been built to order in small numbers for some time.

There were two basic versions of this car produced; the two 8-seater DX/DX2 versions and the 5-seater STD version. The DX2 version of the Versa was equipped with twin air conditioners for front and rear. The Versa was fitted with the same 16-valve, 1.3-liter four-cylinder engine generating 82 hp (61 kW) at 6000 rpm as the Every Plus. It is controlled by a 16-bit engine management system.

The initial target audience for this vehicle were customers who planned to buy a sedan like the Maruti Esteem or a utility vehicle like Tata Sumo. The 82 bhp (61 kW) engine is located under the front seat. The Versa can reach from 0–60 mph in 13.5 seconds.

Maruti Suzuki Eeco was introduced in India by Maruti Suzuki in January 2010. This car is a refresh of the Versa, but equipped with a new 1196 cc four-cylinder in-line engine. The Eeco makes 55 kW (73 bhp) at 6000 rpm, 101 Nm (74 ft lb) at 3000 rpm. It is delivered in either 5-seater or 7-seater versions.

==== Changan group variants ====
Chang'an/Chana Star (SC6320G) is a licensed variation of the Suzuki Every Plus for the Chinese market. Changan has the license due to the Changan Suzuki joint venture. The front DRG of the Star was completely redesigned, but from the rest of the body panels, the relationship with the Suzuki Every Plus was still clearly visible. Newer models of the Chana Star are still available for production as of 2020. Examples include the Chana Star 5 truck and Chana Star 3 minivan.

The Changhe Suzuki Landy was a passenger minivan based on the fifth-generation Every, sold in China between 2007 and 2012.

Further re-badged versions were sold under the Tiger Truck brand in North America.

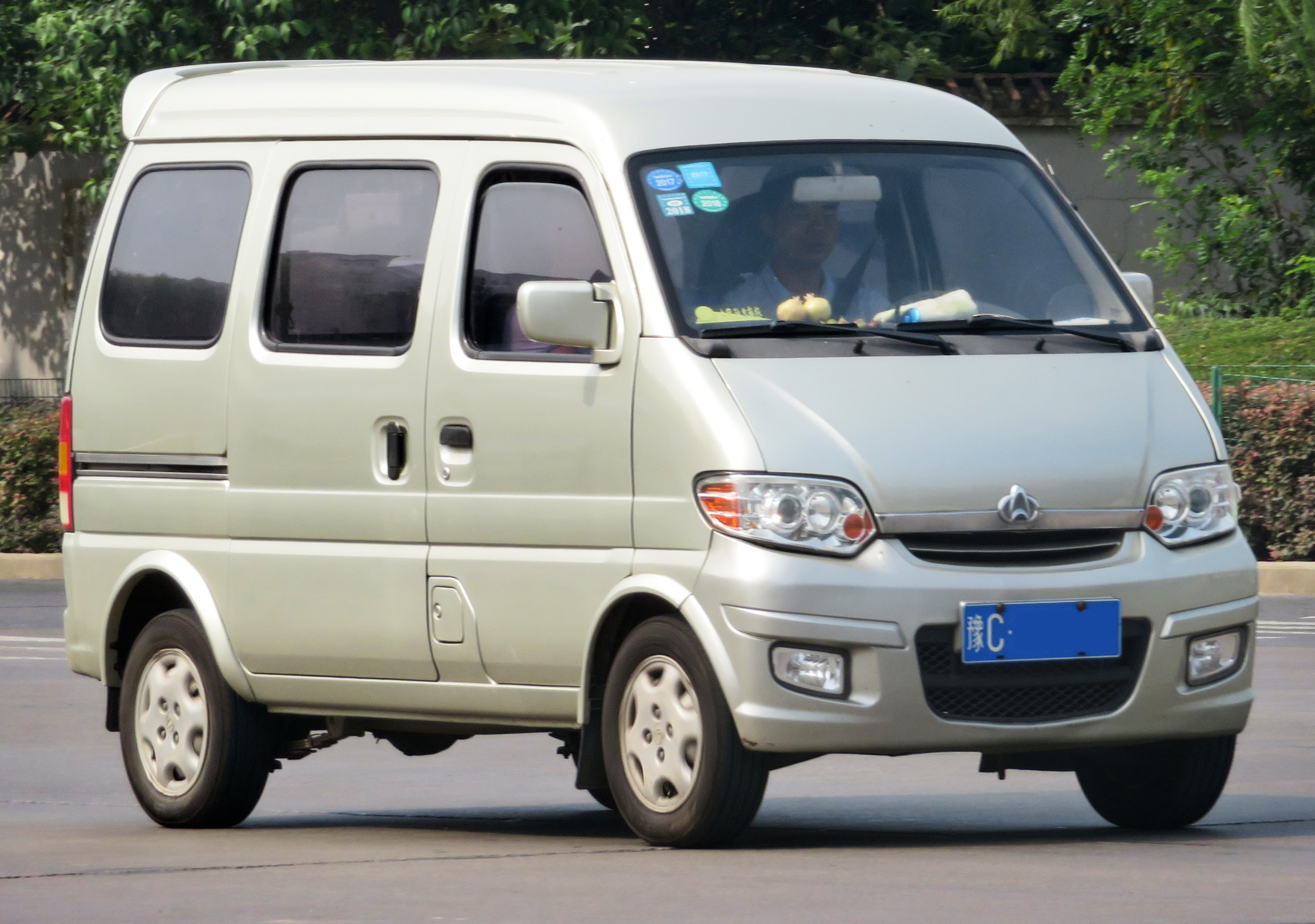
Chana Star (pre-facelift, China)

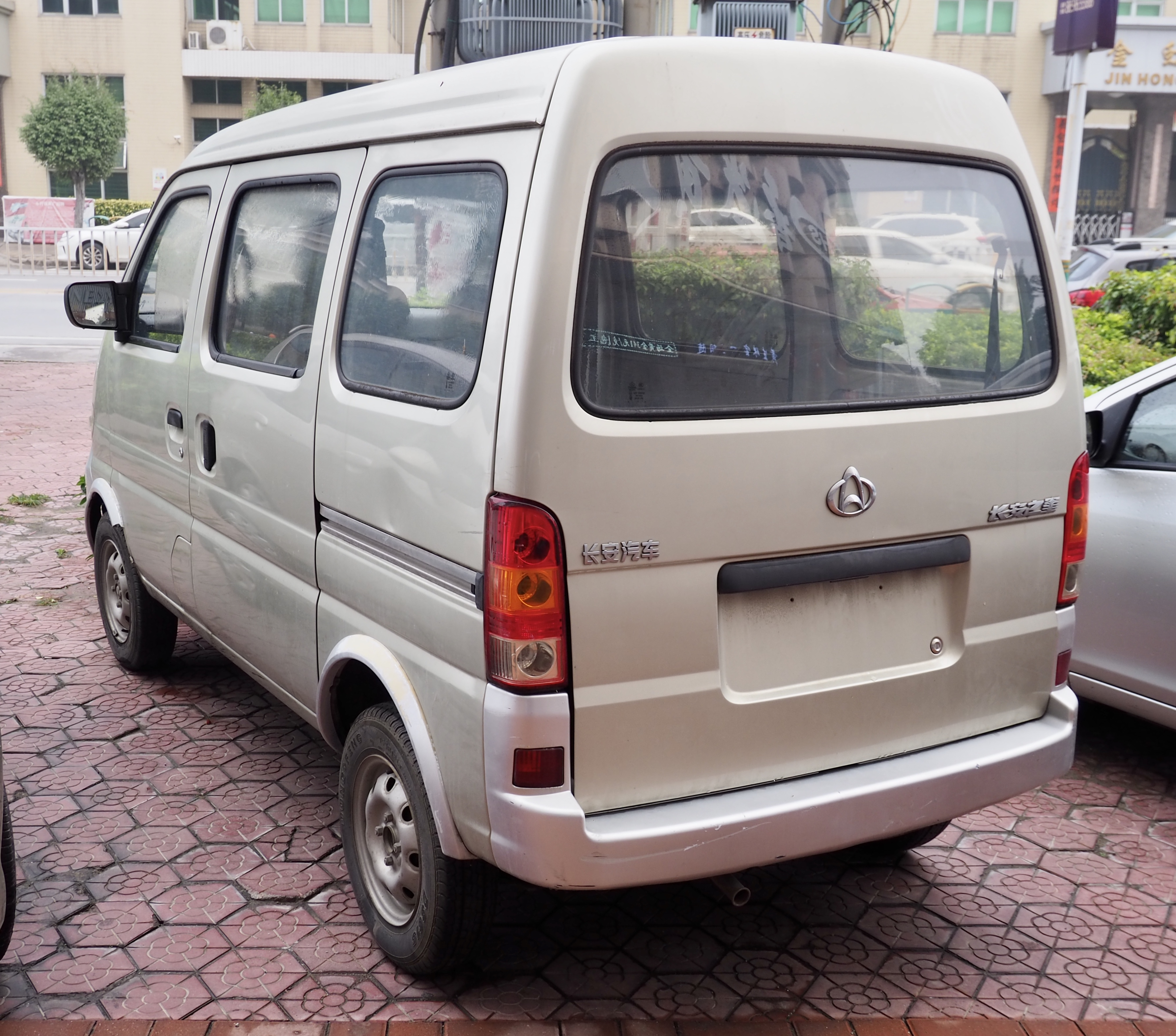
Chana Star (pre-facelift, China)

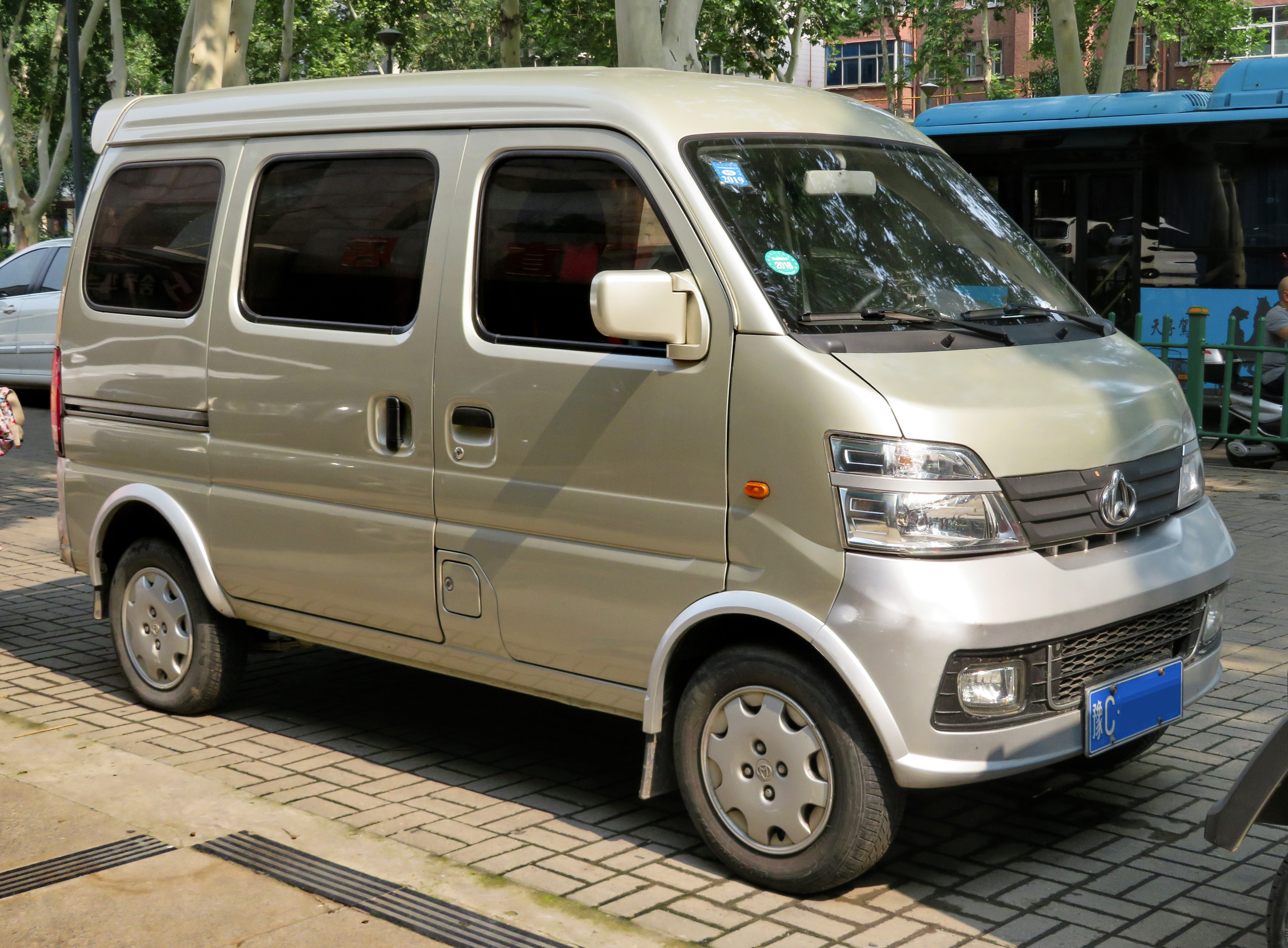
Chana Star (facelift, China)

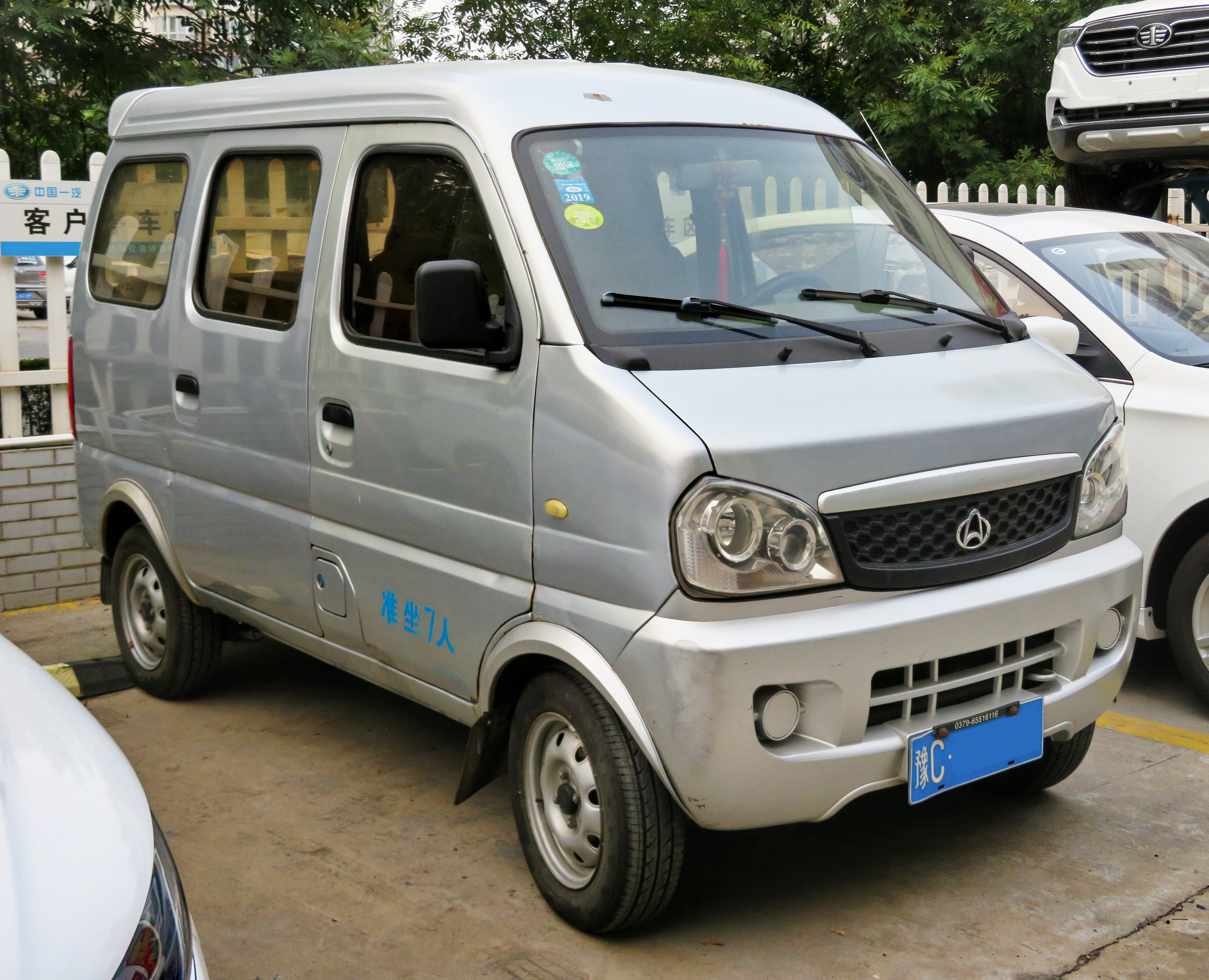
Chana Xingguang (China)

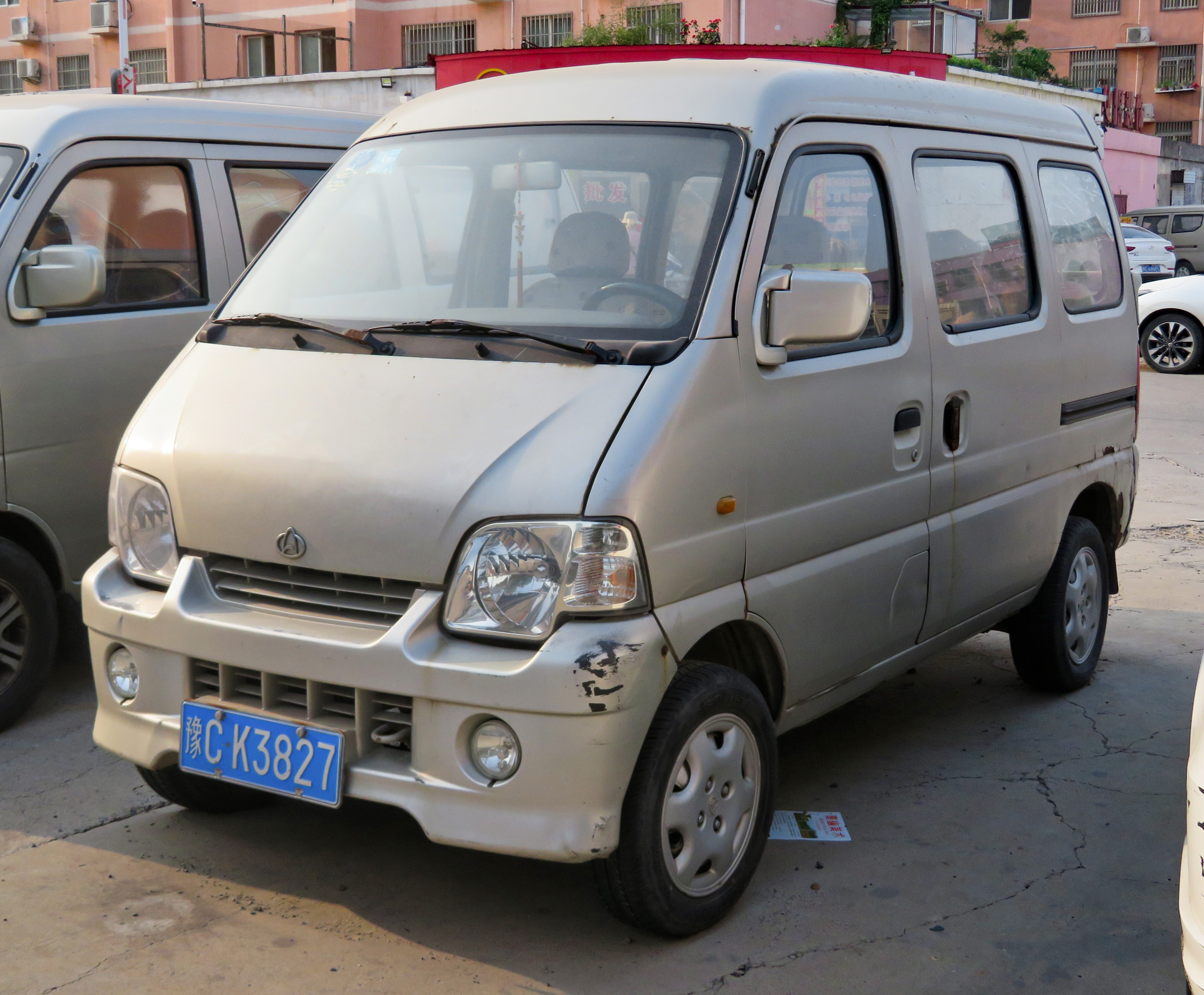
Chana Xingyun (China)

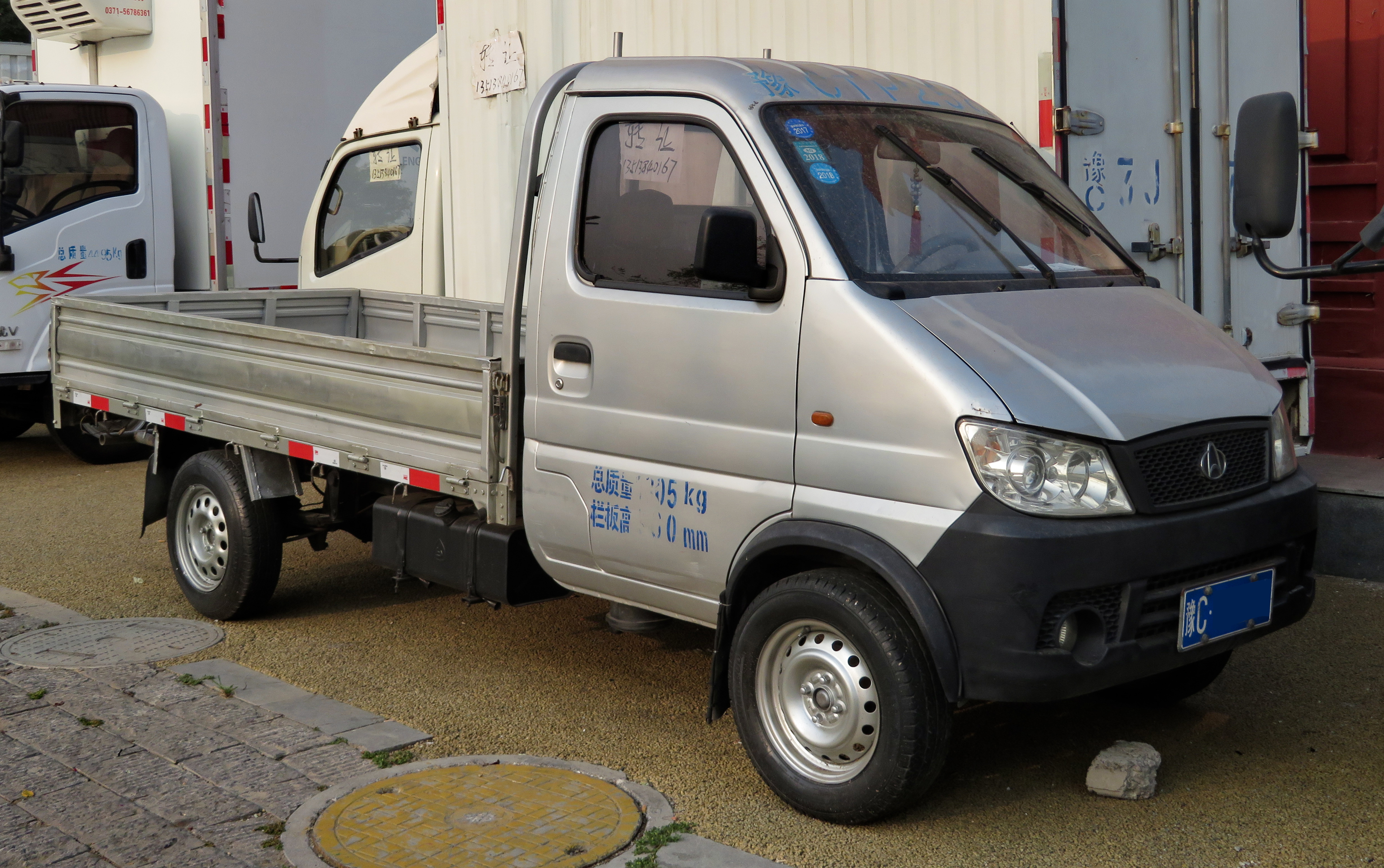
Chana-Kuayue Xinbao mini (pre-facelift)

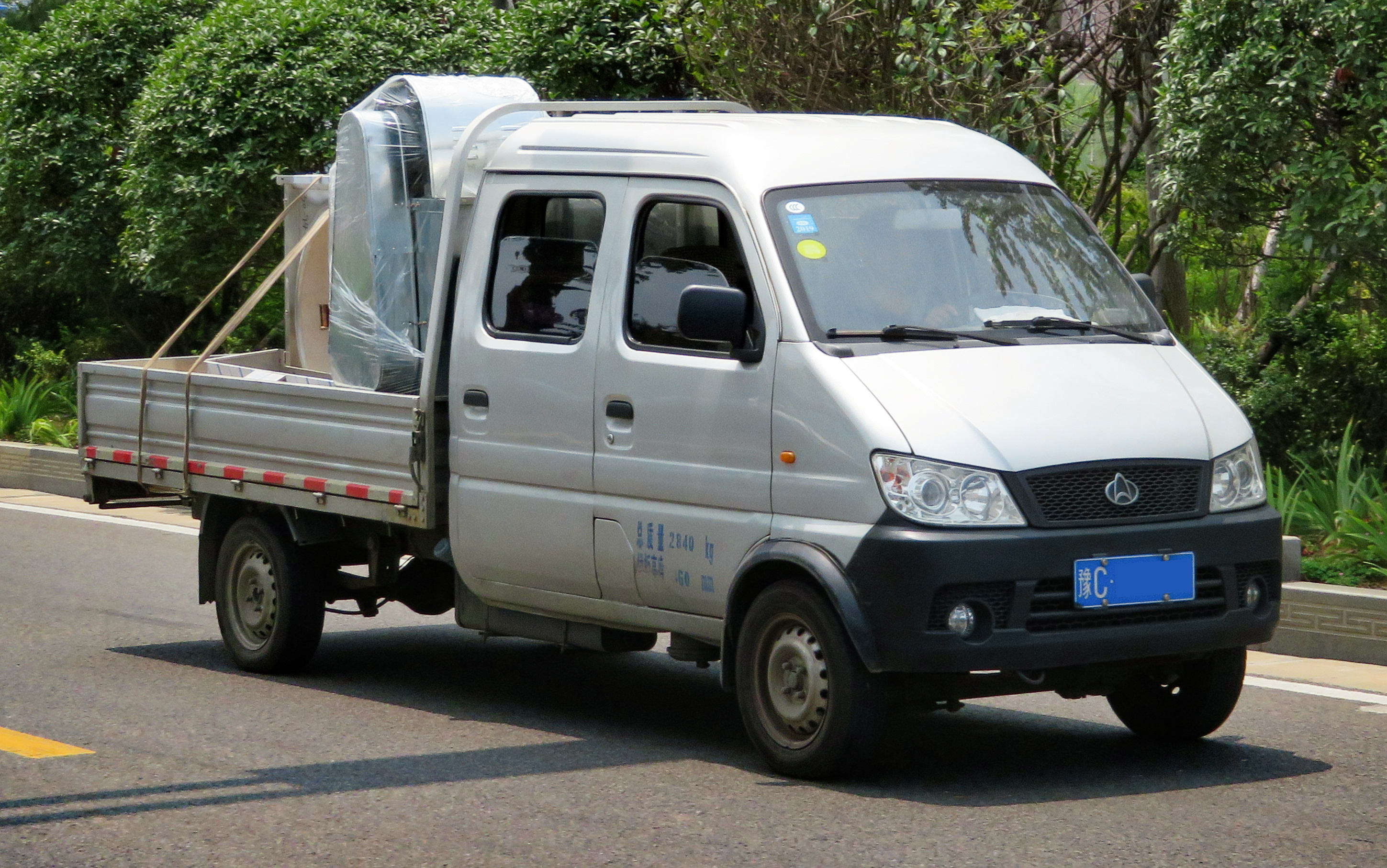
Chana-Kuayue Xinbao mini double cab (pre-facelift)

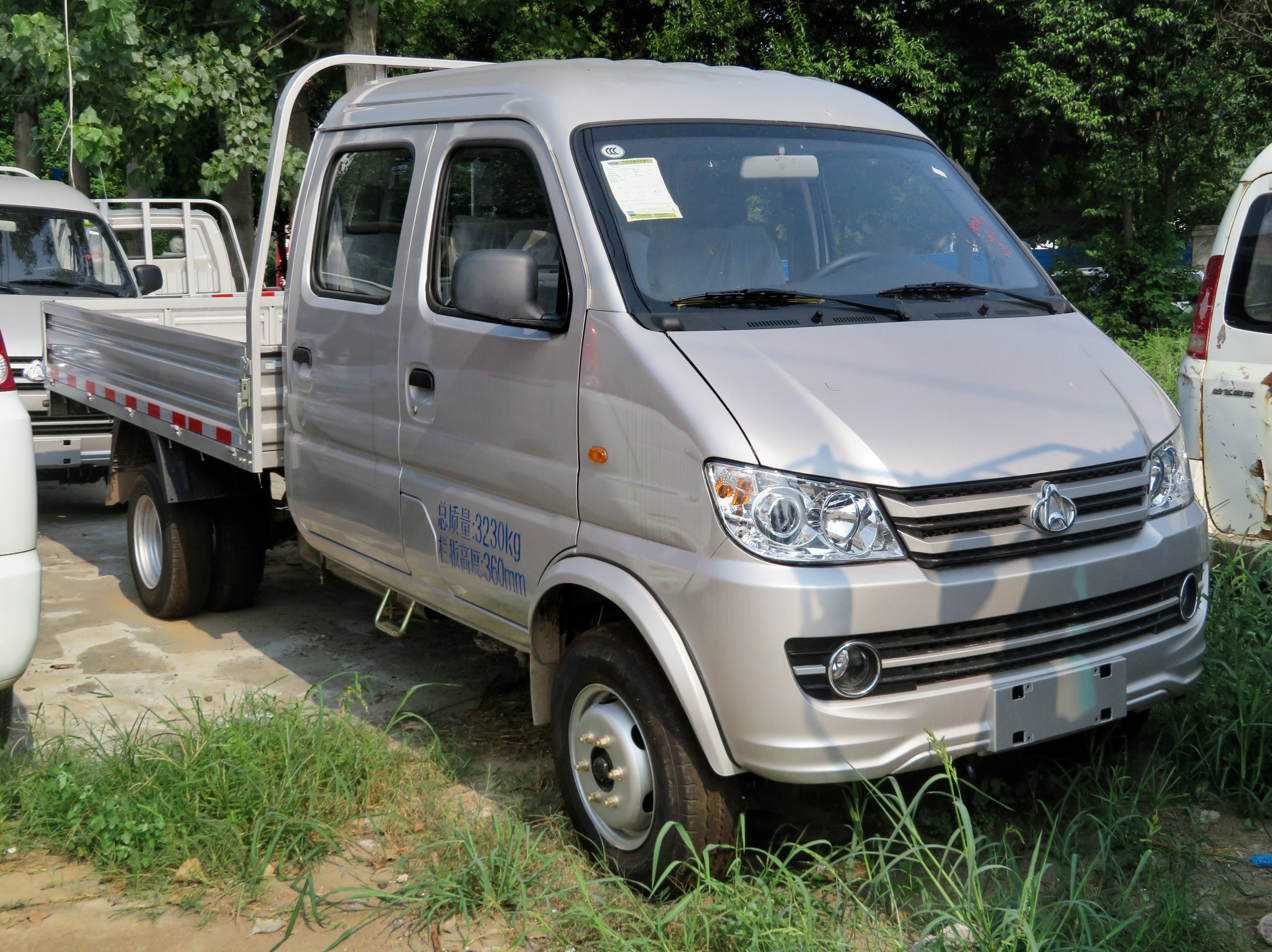
Chana-Kuayue Xinbao double cab (facelift) with dual rear wheels

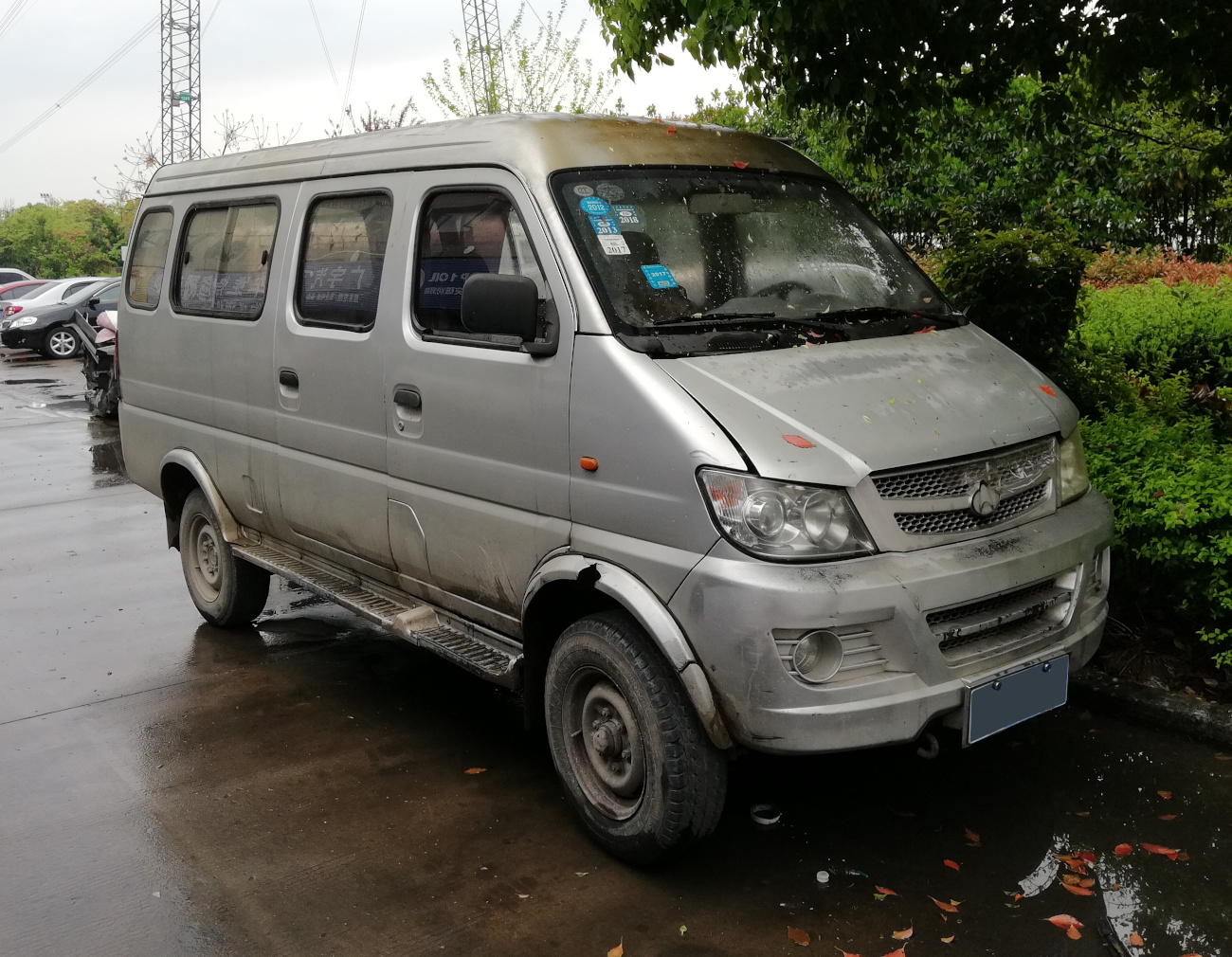
Chana-Kuayue Xunlong

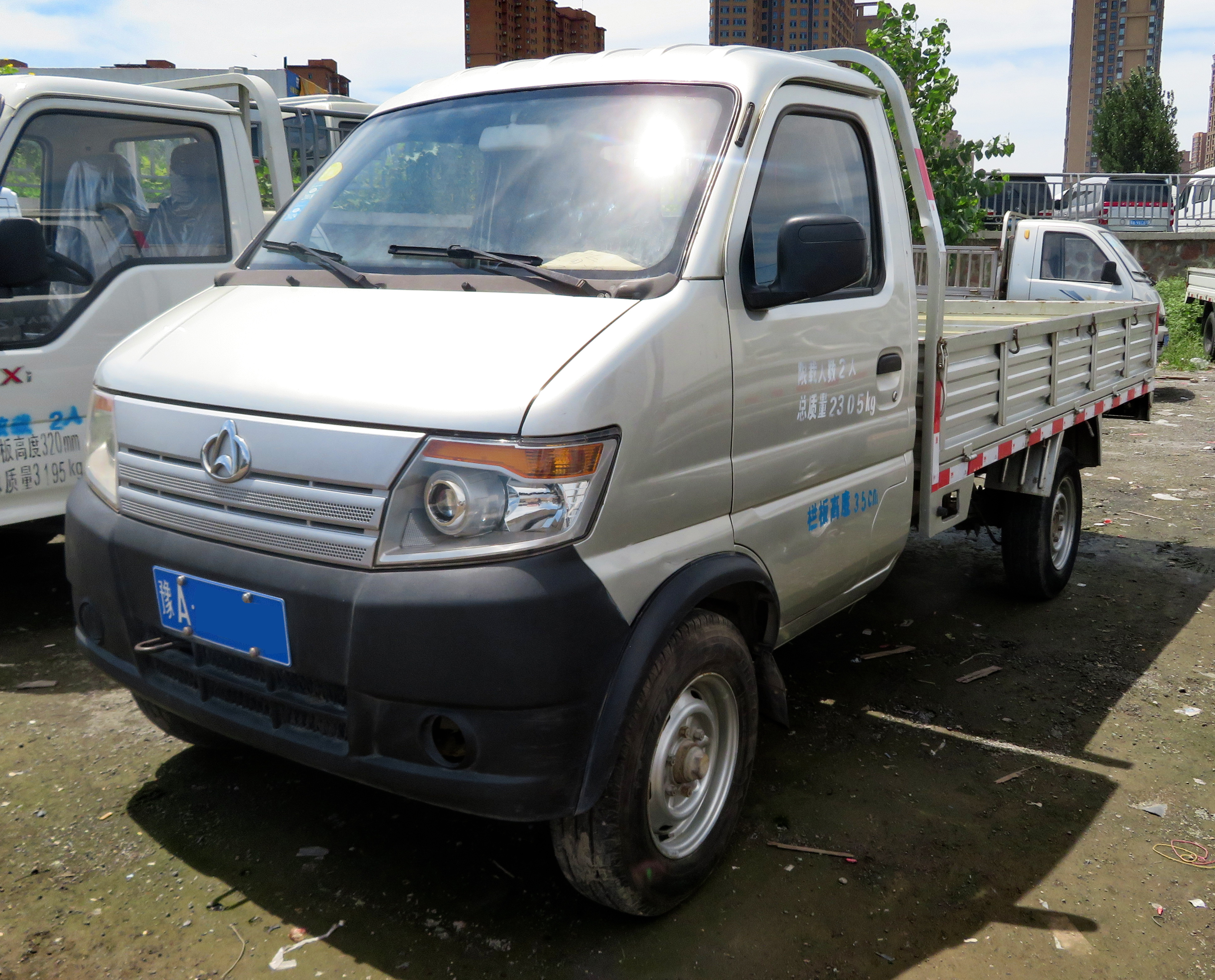
Chana Shenqi T20 (pre-facelift)

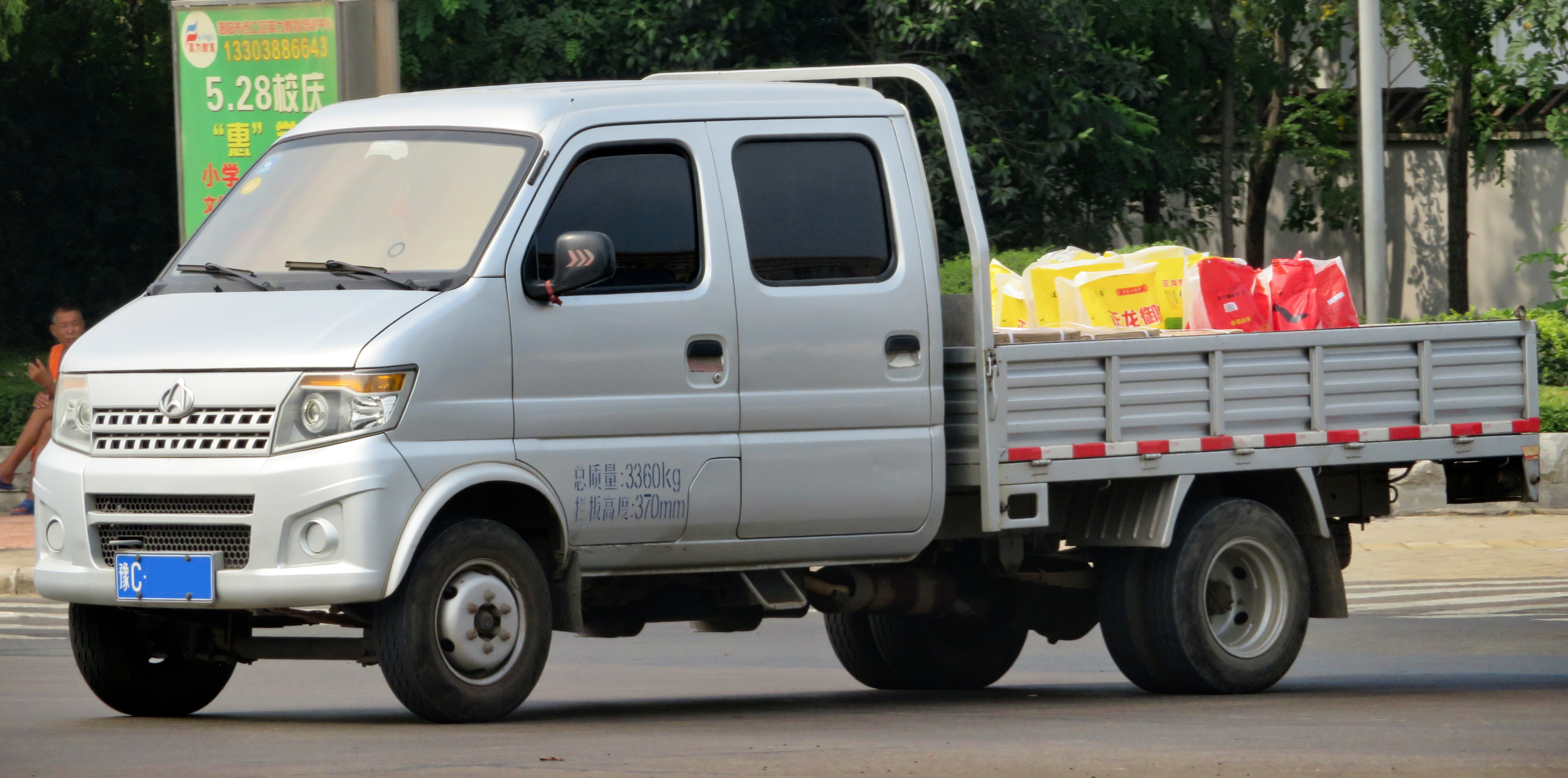
Chana Shenqi T20L double cab (facelift) with dual rear wheels

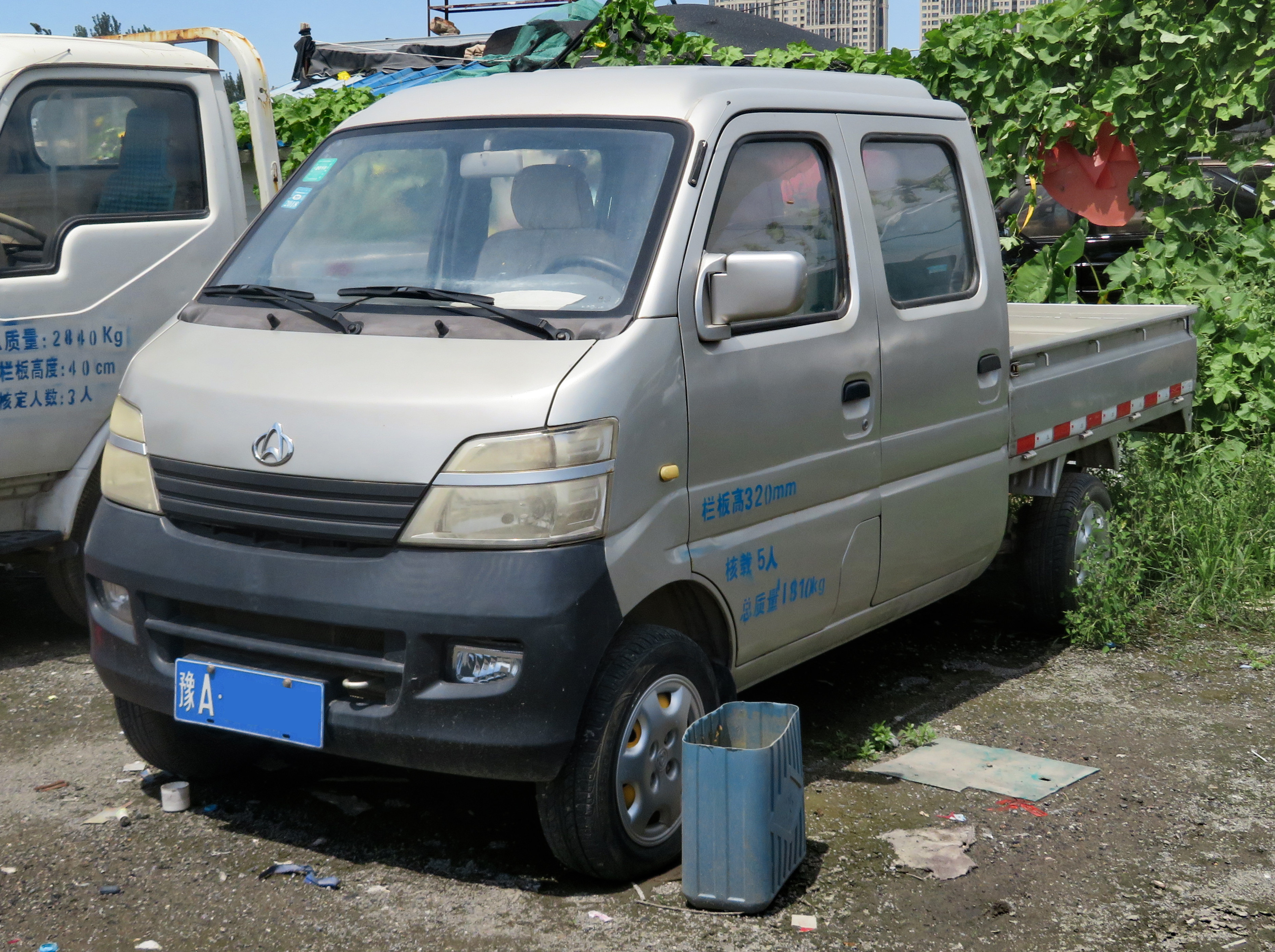
Chana Star 2 double cab (facelift)

==== Dongfeng DFAC Xiaobawang ====
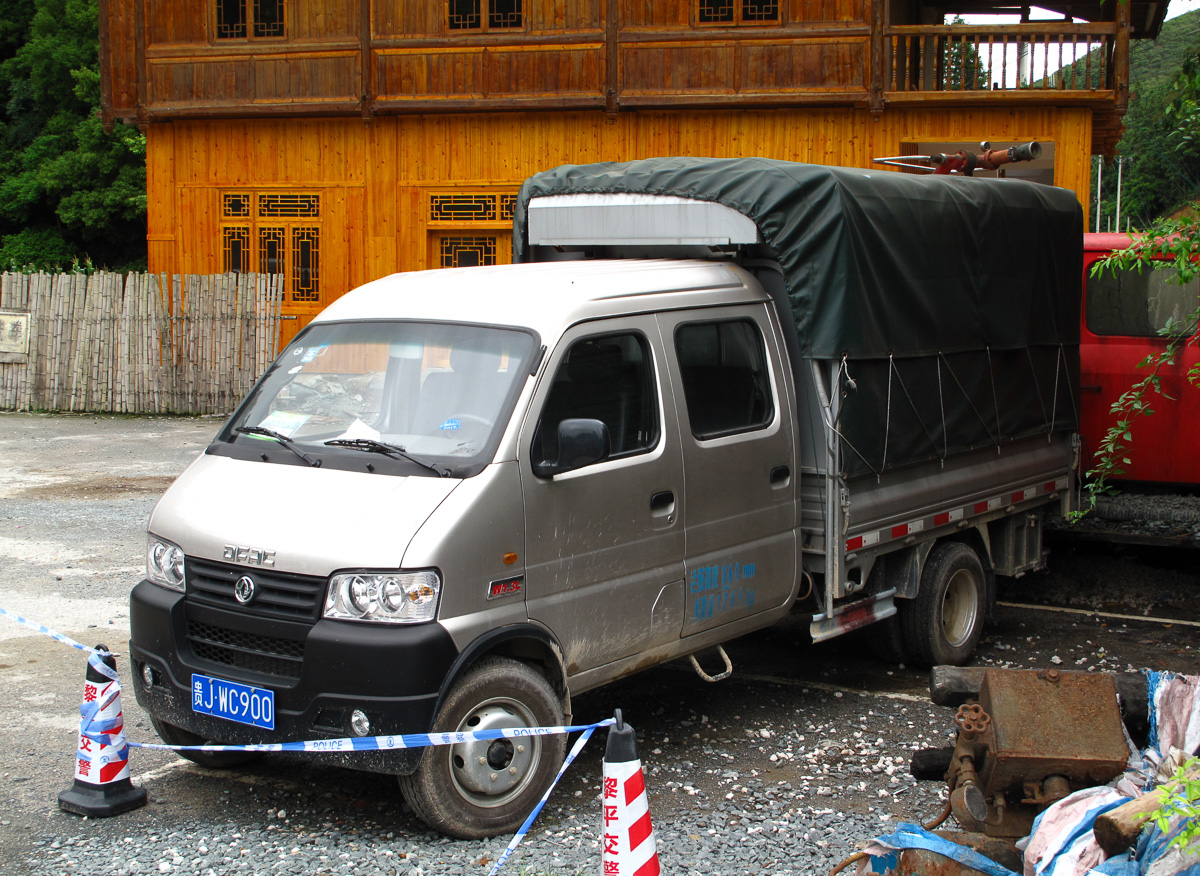
Dongfeng DFAC Xiaobawang with dual rear wheels

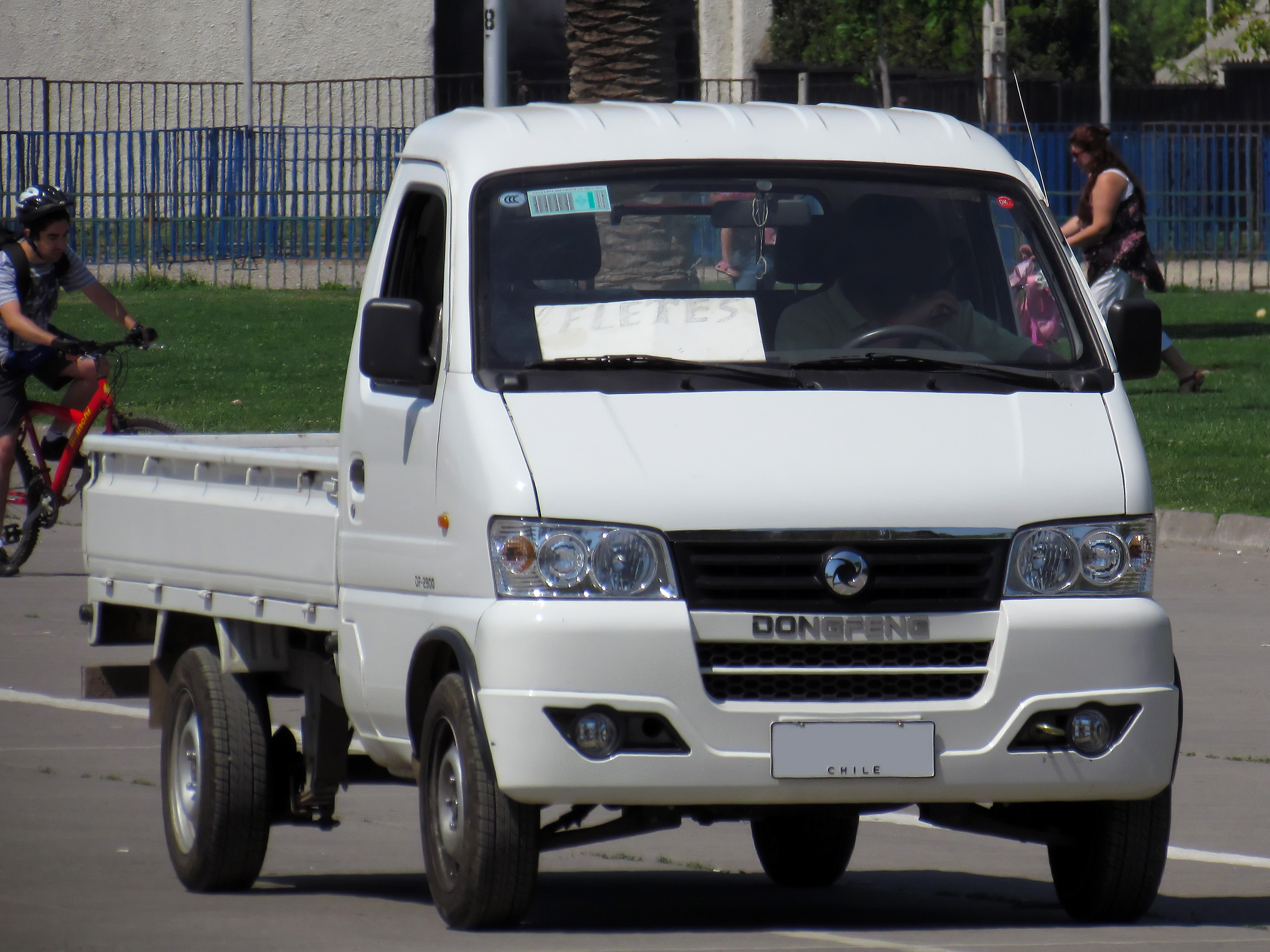
Dongfeng DFAC DF-2900

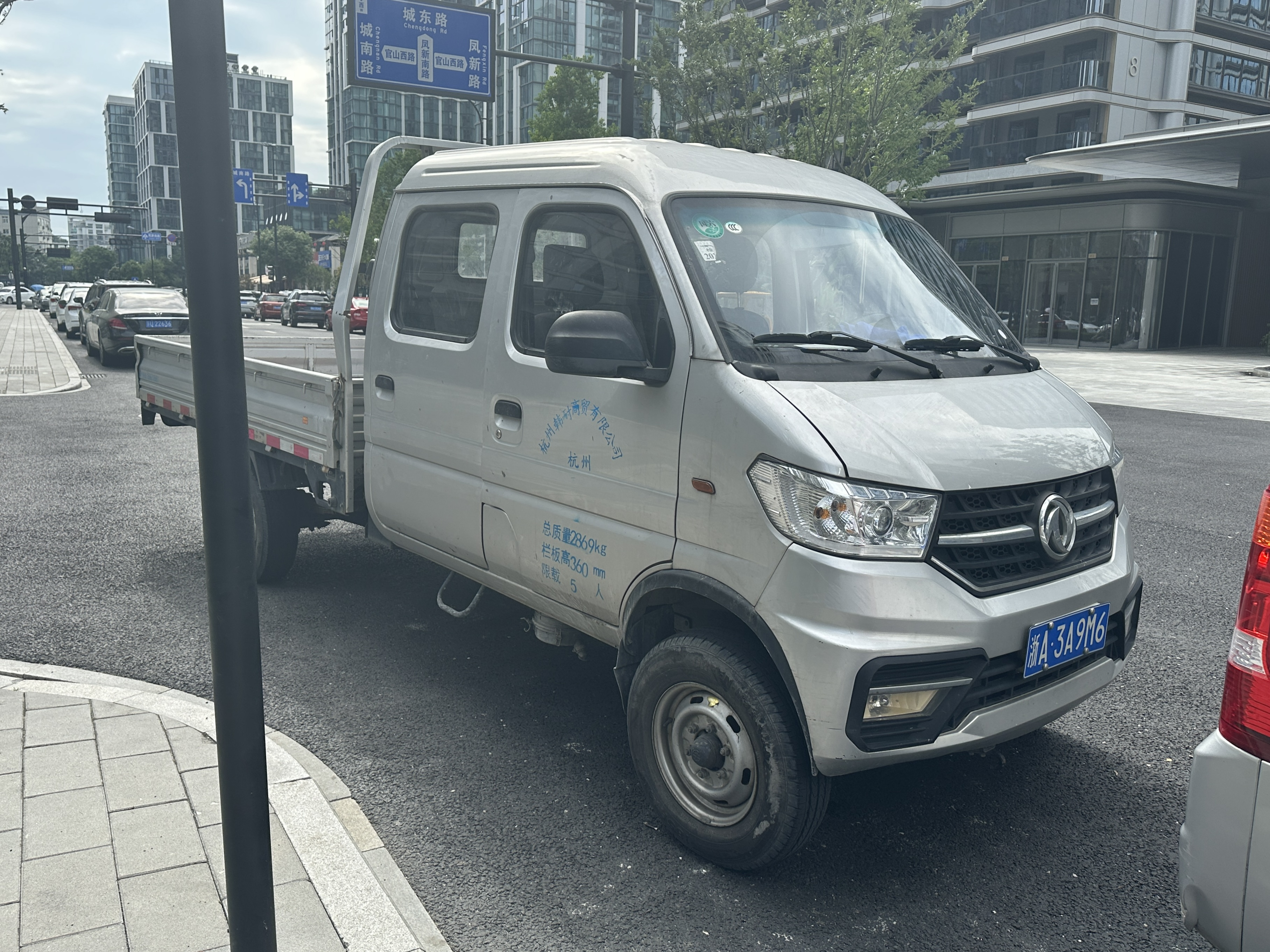
Dongfeng DFAC Xiaobawang W08

==== Karry T-Series (Youjin) ====
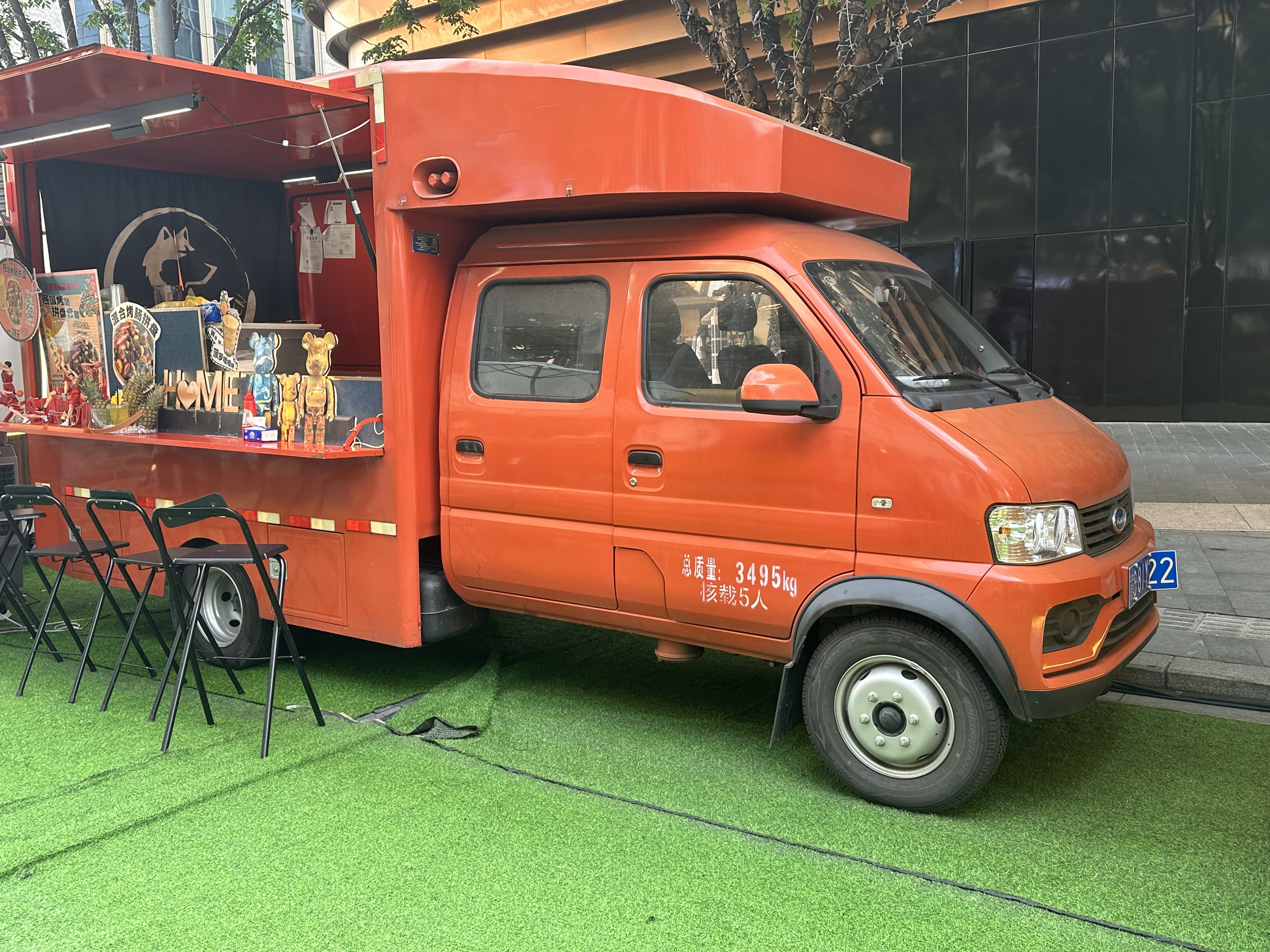
Karry Youjin crew cab with dual rear wheels.

=== Suzuki Landy (2007) ===
Suzuki Landy
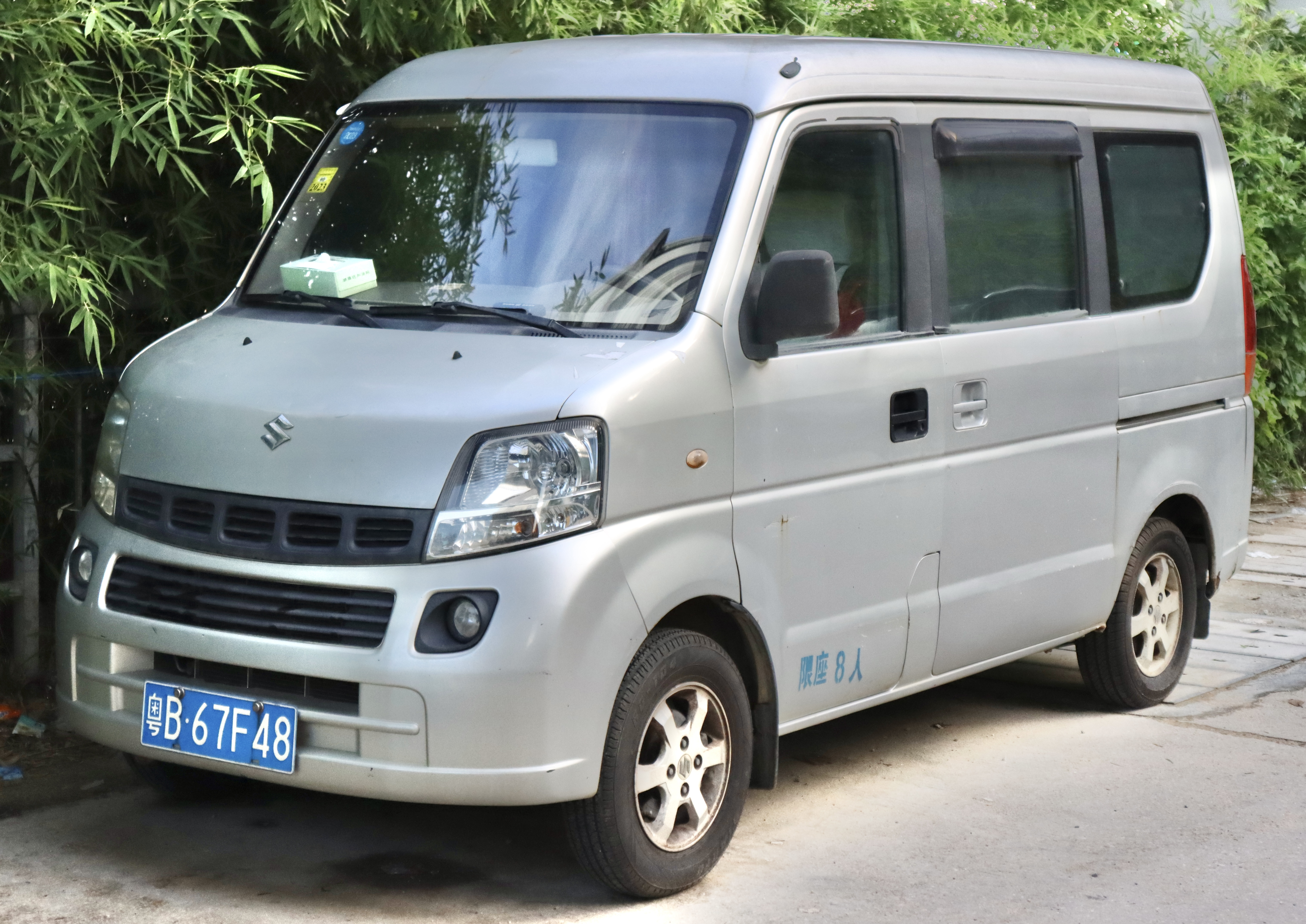
- 2010 Suzuki Landy by Changhe-Suzuki

Overview
- Production: 2007–2012

Body and chassis
- Body style: 5-door passenger van
- Layout: Front mid-engine, rear-wheel-drive

Powertrain
- Engine: 1.5L K14B I4 (petrol)
- Transmission: 5-speed manual

Dimensions
- Wheelbase: 2,430 mm (95.7 in)
- Length: 3,850 mm (151.6 in)
- Width: 1,510 mm (59.4 in)
- Height: 1,910 mm (75.2 in)
- Curb weight: 1,065–1,100 kg (2,347.9–2,425.1 lb)

Chronology
- Predecessor: Suzuki Carry (Fourth generation)

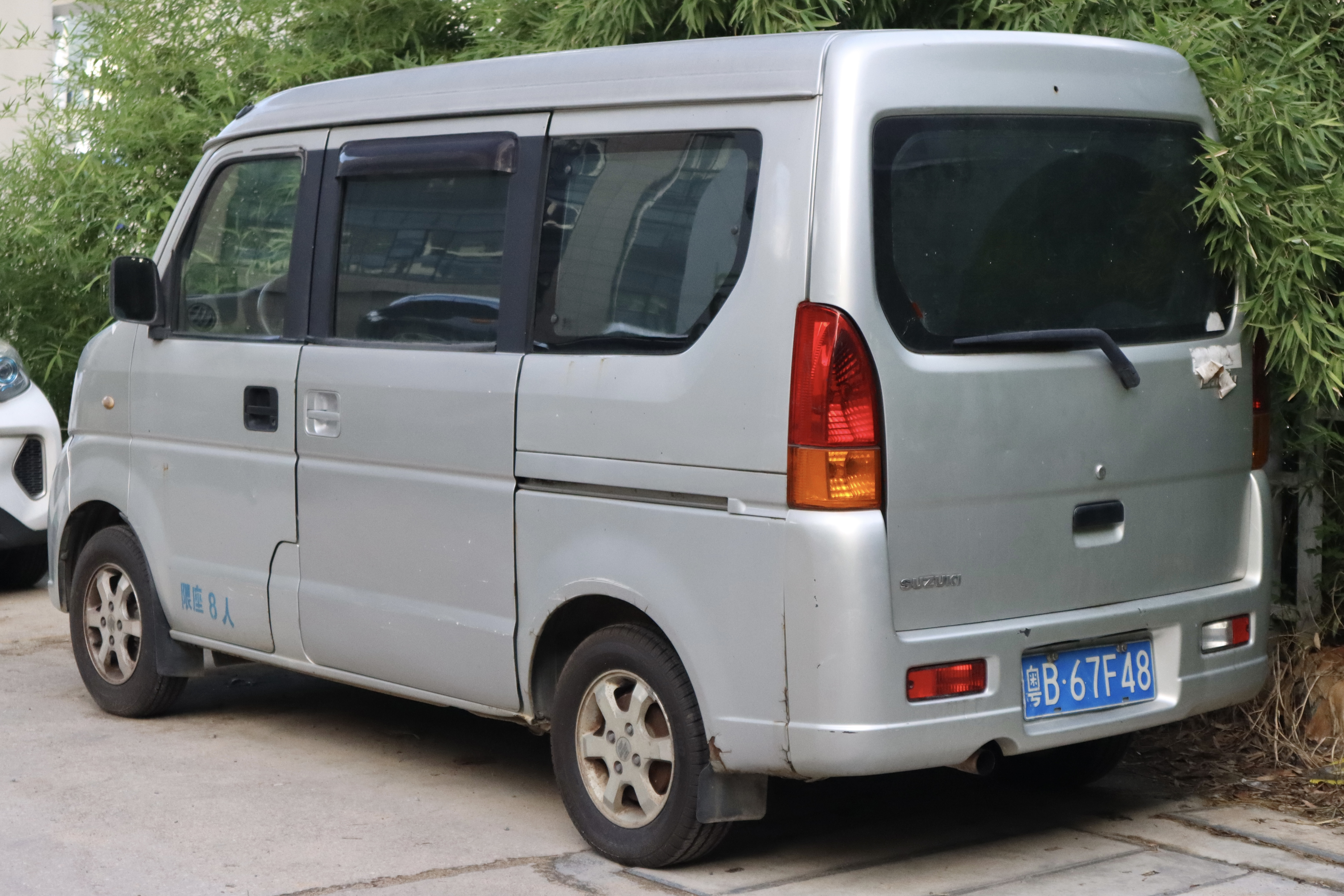
2010 Changhe-Suzuki Landy (rear)

The Suzuki Landy (铃木浪迪) sold in China from 2007 to 2012 was produced by Changhe-Suzuki (昌河铃木) and was based on the Japanese market fifth-generation Suzuki Every, featuring a restyled front end and an extended and restyled rear overhang. The Changhe Suzuki Landy Sunshine trim is powered by the K14B engine developing a maximum power output of 70KW and 115N·m mated to a 5-speed manual transmission.

=== Suzuki e Every ===
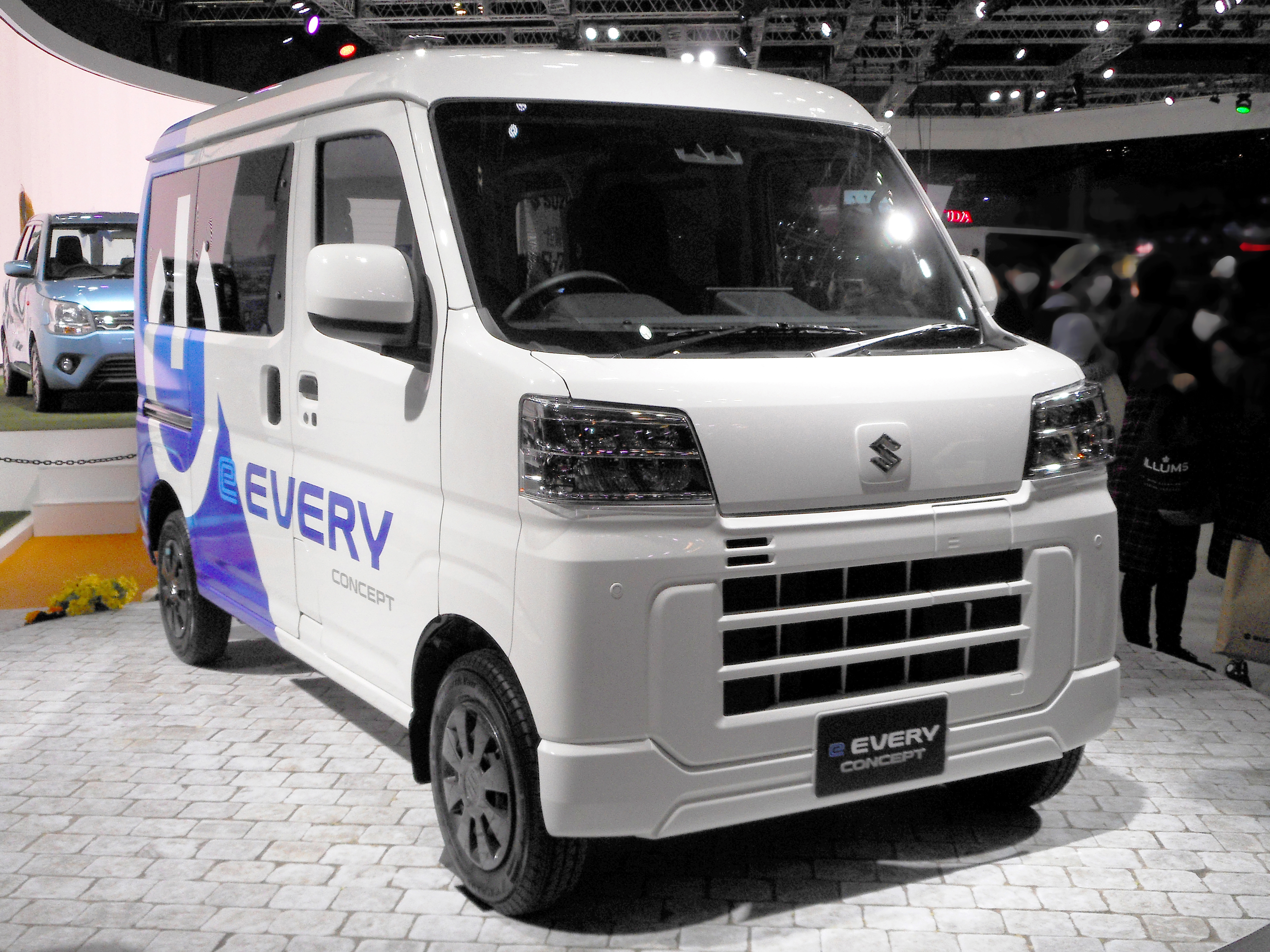
Suzuki e Every Concept

In 2023, Suzuki, Daihatsu, and Toyota jointly developed a battery-electric for light commercial vehicles and unveiled a prototype of a BEV based on the eleventh generation Daihatsu Hijet Cargo. A prototype model was exhibited at the 2023 Japan Mobility Show.

The e Every was released on 9 March 2026.

An internal unit called the Every EV was unveiled in 2012, although it did not reach mass production, Suzuki received type approval based on Mitsubishi Minicab MiEV, and at least 12 units will be supplied but was cancelled.
