= List of Suzuki engines =

This is a list of automobile engines developed and sold by the Suzuki Motor Corporation. Suzuki is unusual in never having made a pushrod automobile engine, and in having depended on two-strokes for longer than most. Their first four-stroke engine was the SOHC F8A, which appeared in 1977. Suzuki continued to offer a two-stroke engine in an automotive application for a considerably longer time than any other Japanese manufacturer.

== Straight twins ==
=== Suzulight SF Series ===
360.88 cc (22.022 cu in) air-cooled 2-stroke, 59 mm × 66 mm (2.32 in × 2.60 in) bore × stroke (downsleeved copy of Lloyd LP400 engine)

- 1955–1959 Suzulight SF
- 1959–1963 Suzulight 360TL / Van 360 (TL)
- 1962–1963 Suzulight Fronte TLA

=== FB Series ===
- 1961–1972 – Suzuki FB engine – air-cooled 359 cc
- 1963–1969 – Suzuki FE/FE2 engine – air-cooled 359 cc, FF applications
- 1972–1976 – Suzuki L50 engine – water-cooled 359 cc
- 1974–1976 – Suzuki L60 engine – water-cooled 446 cc (export only)

=== FA/FC (prototype)199 ===
360 cc (22 cu in) 2-stroke, 64 mm × 56 mm (2.52 in × 2.20 in) bore/stroke. This prototype produced 25 bhp (19 kW) at 6000 rpm. It was fitted to a rear-engined prototype (also named FC) in 1961, as part of the development work for the LC10 Fronte.

=== Daihatsu's AB10 ===
- 1977.6–1978 – Daihatsu AB10 engine – 0.55 L

=== E08A engine ===
- 2015–2020 – see Diesel engines section – 0.8 L

== V-twins ==
=== P511 ===
645cc, water-cooled, 4-stroke, 81.0 mm x 62.6 mm bore/stroke

- 1999-2002 SV650 - First generation
- 2003-2008 SV650 - Second generation
- 2004-2011 DL650 V-Strom - First generation
- 2009-2013 SFV650 - Gladius
- 2012-2016 DL650 V-Strom - Second generation
- 2017-current SV650 - Third generation
- 2017-current DL650 V-Strom - Third generation
- 2019-2020 SV650X - Third generation, factory café racer variant

== Three cylinders ==
=== C engine — 2-stroke ===
- C10 — 785 cc (47.9 cu in) 70 mm × 68 mm (2.76 in × 2.68 in)
  - 1965.12–1969.10 Suzuki Fronte 800
- C20 — 1,100 cc (67.1 cu in) – 80 PS (59 kW) prototype engine for intended Suzuki Fronte 1100

=== LC engine ===
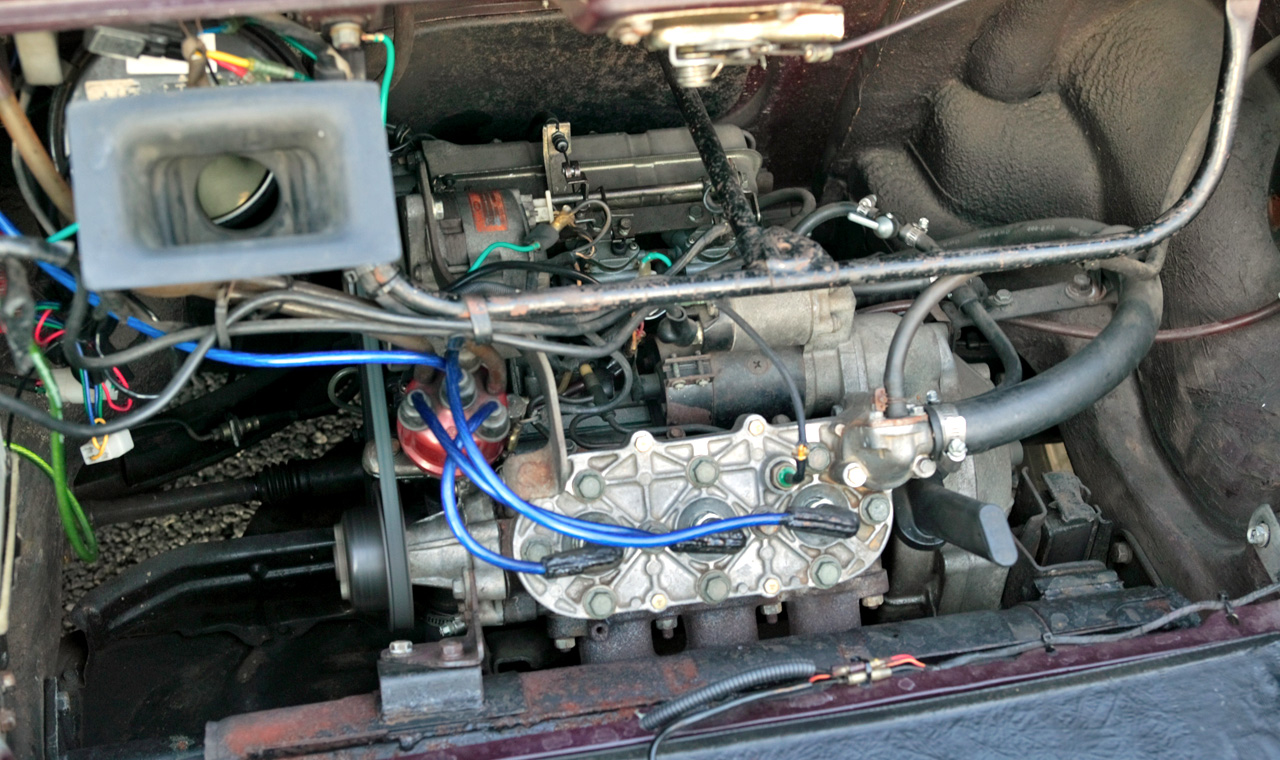
LC10W three-cylinder engine in Fronte Coupé

1967–1977 – Suzuki LC engine – 0.36–0.48 L

=== FB engine ===
1975–1987 – FB Series – 0.54 L
Rather than being a newly developed engine, the T5 series is essentially an FB/L50 2-cylinder with a third cylinder added, its origins thus dating back to 1961.

=== F engine ===
1980–2022 – F engine (three-cylinder) – 0.5–0.8 L

=== G engine ===
1984–2006 – G engine (three-cylinder) 1.0 L

=== K engine ===
1994–present – K engine (three-cylinder) – 0.7–1.0 L

=== R engine ===
2011–present – 0.7 L

=== Z engine ===
2023–present – 1.2 L

==== Z12E ====
Developed as the successor of K12 engine, introduced first in November 2023. It is also available with mild hybrid configuration, combined with ISG unit.

- Displacement: 1,197 cc (1.2 L)
- Bore and stroke: 74 mm x 92.8 mm
- Valvetrain: DOHC, 12-valve, Dual VVT
- Compression ratio: 13.0–13.9
- Maximum power:
  - 80–83 PS (59–61 kW; 79–82 hp) at 5700 rpm
- Maximum torque:108-112N⋅m 108–112 N⋅m (80–83 lb⋅ft; 11–11 kg⋅m) at 4500 rpm

Applications:

  - 2023–present Suzuki Swift
  - 2024–present Suzuki Dzire
  - 2025–present Suzuki Solio
  - 2025–present Suzuki Xbee
  - 2026–present Suzuki Baleno / Toyota Glanza

== Four cylinders ==
=== F engine ===
1979–2001 – F engine (four-cylinder) – 0.7–1.1 L

=== G engine ===
1984–present – G engine (four-cylinder) – 1.0–1.6 L

=== J engine ===
1996–2019 – J engine (four-cylinder) – 1.8–2.4 L

=== K engine ===
1997–present – K engine (four-cylinder) – 1.0–1.5 L

=== M engine ===
1999–present – M engine– 1.3–1.8 L

=== E15A engine ===
2019–2020 – see Diesel engines section – 1.5 L

== V6 engines ==
=== H engine ===
1994–2009 – H engine – 2.0–2.7 L

=== N engine ===
2006–2009 – N engine – 3.2–3.6 L

== Diesel engines ==
=== D engine ===
2006–present – D engine – 1.3–2.0 L

Licensed from Fiat/FCA:

- D13A 1.3 L (1,248 cc) 4-cylinder
  - Suzuki Wagon R+ (Europe)
  - 2007–2013 — Suzuki SX4 sedan
  - 2009–2016 — Suzuki Splash/Maruti Suzuki Ritz
  - 2012–2019 — Suzuki Ertiga
  - 2014–2019 — Suzuki Ciaz
  - 2017–2019 — Suzuki Ignis
  - 2008–2020 — Suzuki Dzire
  - 2006–2020 — Suzuki Swift
  - 2013–2020 — Suzuki S-Cross
  - 2015–2020 — Suzuki Baleno
  - 2015–2020 — Suzuki Vitara Brezza
- D16A 1.6 L (1,598 cc) 4-cylinder
  - 2013–2021 — Suzuki SX4 S-Cross
  - 2015–present — Suzuki Vitara
- D19A 1.9 L (1,910 cc) 4-cylinder
  - 2006–2009 — Suzuki SX4 (Europe)
- D20A 2.0 L (1,956 cc) 4-cylinder
  - 2010–2014 — Suzuki SX4 (Europe)

=== E engine ===
- E08A — 0.8 L (793 cc) 2-cylinder

The E08A engine is a short-lived diesel engine engineered mostly for the Indian market. It is a small inline twin 4-stroke diesel engine with a bore × stroke of 77 mm × 85.1 mm (3.03 in × 3.35 in), giving 793 cc (48.4 cu in). As a 360° parallel twin it features a Balance shaft located beside the crankshaft. This all aluminium engine is turbocharged and intercooled, has a 15:1 compression ratio and a DOHC cylinder head with 8 valves. Power output depends heavily on the application.
- 2015–2017 Suzuki Celerio with 35 kW (47 hp) at 3500 min^{−1} and 125 N⋅m (92 lbf⋅ft) at 2000 min^{−1}.
- 2016–2020 Suzuki Super Carry (India & Philippines) with 24 kW (32 hp) at 3500 min^{−1} and 75 N⋅m (55 lbf⋅ft) at 2000 min^{−1}.

- E15A — 1.5 L (1,498 cc) 4-cylinder
  - 2019–2020 Suzuki Ciaz (India)
  - 2019–2020 Suzuki Ertiga (India)

== See also ==
- List of Suzuki automobiles
