= LC-10 =

LC-10 may refer to:

- Croses LC-10 Criquet, a 1960s French two-seat homebuilt aircraft
- Launch Complex 10 (disambiguation), two American launch pads
- Suzuki LC10 engine, a 356 cc air-cooled engine
