= Lloyd 250 =

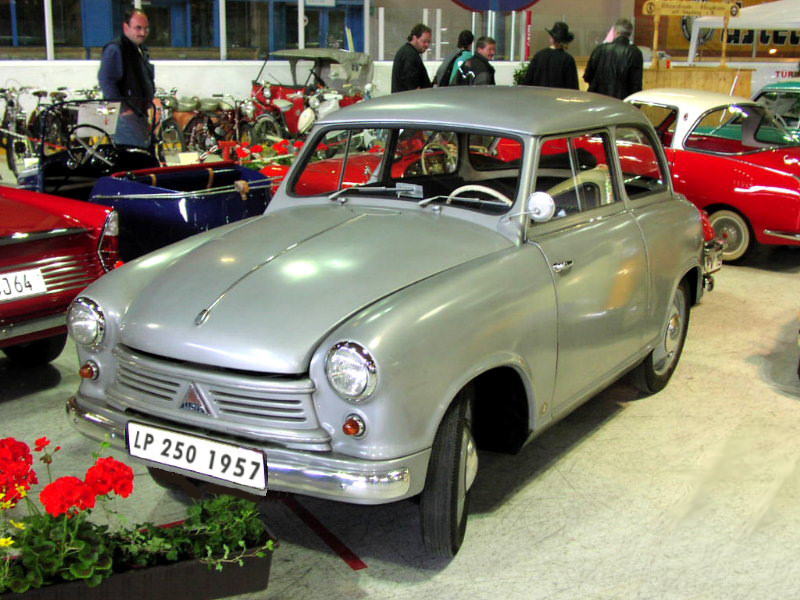
Lloyd LP 250 V (1957)

The Lloyd LP 250 is a small car introduced in June 1956 and offered for sale until 1957 by Lloyd Motoren Werke G.m.b.H. of Bremen. The body and running gear came from the existing Lloyd LP 400. The LP 250 differed in having the size of its two cylinder two stroke engine reduced to 250 cc. This produced a claimed maximum power of just 8 kW (11 PS; 11 hp) at 5000 rpm, less, even, than the 9.8 kW (13.3 PS; 13.1 hp) of the LP 400.

The Lloyd LP 250 became known in Germany as the “Driving Test Nerves Car” („Prüfungsangst-Auto“) because, under the licence classifications then in force, vehicles having an engine capacity below 250 cc fell into a more accessible drivers’ licence category (Licence Category 4) than larger engined cars. Presumably at the time when the drivers’ licence categories were devised, it had not occurred to the legislators that such a category might include a four-seat passenger car. In later years, elderly motorists who had never acquired a more conventional drivers’ licence were happy to spell out that "vehicles" in this case included cars as evidence that they were indeed licensed to drive cars and did not need to take the additional test normally necessary for driving passenger cars (Licence Category 3).

On its introduction in summer 1956, the car lacked some of the relatively luxurious features included on the LP 400 sister model. It came without hubcaps, bumpers or a backrest for passengers in the back seat. The car was offered for sale at just DM 2,980, though the missing features were available at extra cost as options. A more fully equipped version, the LP 250 V, replaced the basic LP 250 in April 1957, the formerly optional fittings becoming standard features; the price was increased to DM 3,350, however, which was the same as the price quoted for the more powerful LP 400.

In total, 3,768 Lloyd LP 250 / LP 250Vs were produced.

== Sources and further reading ==
- Peter Kurze/Ralf Kiese: Lloyd – der Wagen für Dich, Delius Klasing Verlag, Bielefeld 2006, ISBN 3-7688-1725-3
