= Michio Suzuki (inventor) =

Japanese entrepreneur and inventor

- 鈴木道雄
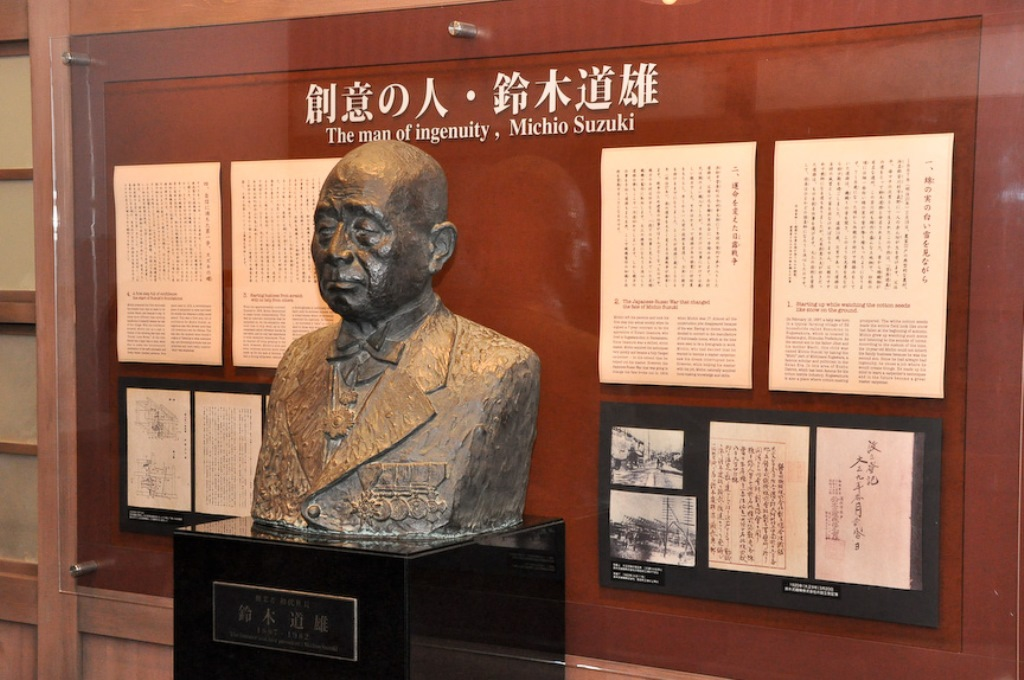
- Michio Suzuki bust at Suzuki Museum, Hamamatsu
- Born: 18 February 1887; Hogawa, Shizuoka, Empire of Japan
- Died: 27 October 1982 (aged 95); Hamamatsu, Shizuoka, Japan
- Occupations: Businessman, inventor
- Known for: Founder of Suzuki

Michio Suzuki (鈴木 道雄, Suzuki Michio) (18 February 1887 – 27 October 1982) was a Japanese businessman and inventor, known primarily for founding the Suzuki Motor Corporation, as well as several innovations in the design of looms.

== Biography ==
=== Early years ===
Suzuki was born on 18 February 1887 (year 20 of the Meiji era) in the village of Nezuminomura (鼠野村), Shizuoka prefecture, a small village of farmers and cotton-weavers. He was named after the historical figure and Shintō deity Sugawara no Michizane. (Note: Suzuki's given name, 道雄 (Michio), is formed by combining the character 道 (Michi) from 道真 (Michizane) with the character 雄 (o), a common ending character for male names.) As the son of cotton farmers, Suzuki worked in the fields from the age of seven or eight. However, Suzuki had always preferred more skilled work, so in 1901, at the age of fourteen, he started a seven-year apprenticeship under the strict guidance of the carpenter Kōtarō Imamura.

When the Russo-Japanese War started in 1904, demand for skilled craftsmen was low, and Imamura was forced, along with his apprentice, to take on the work of maintaining the looms on a factory floor. Although Imamura considered this work unfit for a craftsman of his calibre, Suzuki flourished in this role, and it would provide inspiration for his later innovations.

=== Founding of Suzuki Loom Manufacturing ===
Suzuki finished his apprenticeship in 1908 at the age of 21, and in the following year Suzuki acquired control of his family's silkworm farm, (Note: There is a lack of consensus on the nature of Suzuki's acquiry of the farm: SuzukiNZ (2017) and Hamamatsu (2012) state that it was given to him by his family, SuzukiSA (2016) states that it was borrowed, and NNDB (2019) states that it was rented.) quickly turning it into a loom manufacturing workshop. Due to his short stature, Suzuki was placed into the secondary reserve category of the Japanese Imperial draft, which allowed him to divert his full attention to the manufacture of looms. His first innovation was a pedal-driven loom which he gave to his mother, who used it to weave cloth ten times faster than she had with her hand loom. Word quickly spread of Suzuki's invention, and he began the mass-manufacture of his new looms, founding the Suzuki Loom Manufacturing Company in October 1909.

Over the next several years, Suzuki continued to innovate loom technology, often incorporating the advice of the weavers who used his looms. The company went public in 1920, and gained international fame a decade later with the production of a punchcard loom which was exported across Southeast Asia, due to its effectiveness in weaving sarongs. However, this success was short-lived, as Japan's export market shrank rapidly following its secession from the League of Nations in 1933.

=== Suzuki Motor Company ===
Not content with restricting his innovations to the manufacture of looms, Suzuki also began experimenting with automotive technology in the mid-1930s, designing a prototype automobile in 1936. This work was disrupted by the Second World War; like many civilian factories, the Suzuki Corporation had their equipment forcefully repurposed to aid in the war effort, in Suzuki's case for the purpose of manufacturing ammunition.

After the war, the Suzuki corporation was one of many corporations which benefitted from the Japanese economic miracle, allowing Suzuki to resume his pre-war work on motorised transportation. In 1952, the Suzuki Corporation launched its first motorised vehicle, the "power-free", a motor-assisted bicycle with a 36cc. two-stroke engine. In 1954, just two years after the first production model of a motorised vehicle, the Suzuki Loom Manufacturing Company was renamed into the Suzuki Motor Corporation. In the following year, the company would launch its first car, the Suzulight, which anticipated the boom in kei cars and introduced several technical innovations.

=== Later life ===
Suzuki stepped down as president of the Suzuki Motor Corporation in 1957 at the age of 70, becoming a member of the Board of Advisors; his son-in-law Shunzō Suzuki took over as the company's second president. Suzuki died in Hamamatsu on 27 October 1982.

== Innovations ==
Suzuki was a prolific inventor throughout his life, holding more than 120 patents in several areas of engineering across several decades.

=== Loom technology ===
- Wood-and-iron floor loom (1909);
- Two-shuttle floor loom, able to weave striped cloth (1911);
- The "Sarong loom", which used a punchcard system similar to Jacquard looms, but was remarkably efficient in its use of the cards (1930).

=== Automotive technology ===
- The "Power-free", a two-stroke, motor-assisted bicycle (1952);
- The Suzuki Suzulight, a small car which had double-wishbone coil-sprung suspension and rack-and-pinion steering, both of which were far ahead of their time (1956).

== Bibliography ==
- "People: Suzuki Michio". Hamamatsu Information Book. Hamanako Institute Corporation. 2012.
- Ozeki, Kazuo (2007). Suzuki Story: Small Cars, Big Ambitions. Tokyo: Miki Press. ISBN 978-4-89522-503-8.
- "Michio Suzuki". The Notable Names Database. 2019.
- "Michio Suzuki – a name woven into Suzuki's history". Suzuki New Zealand. 2017.
- "Who was Michio Suzuki?". Suzuki South Africa. 2016.
- "Michio Suzuki – Hamamatsu Ijinden".
