= Suzuki Suzulight =

Suzulight
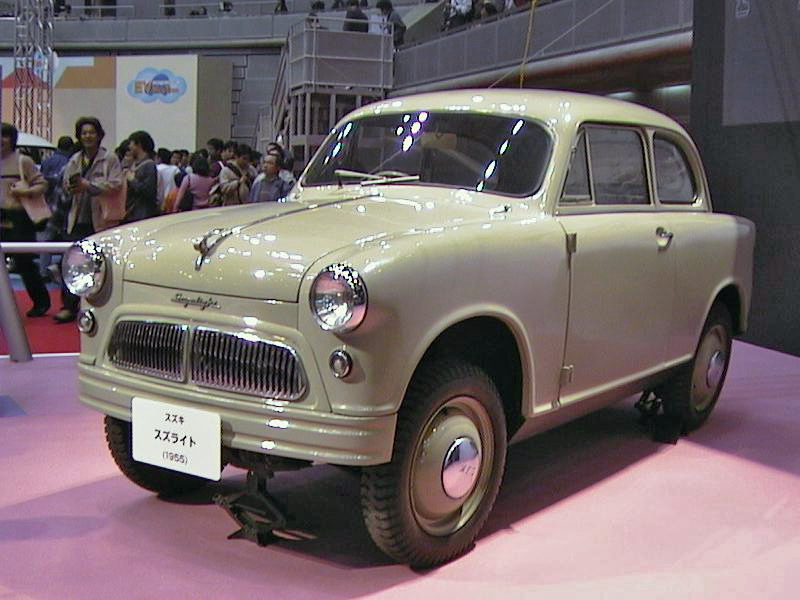

Overview
- Manufacturer: Suzuki
- Production: October 1955-1969
- Assembly: Takatsuka Assembly, Hamamatsu, Shizuoka, Japan; Kosai Assembly Plant, Hamana-gun, Shizuoka, Japan

Body and chassis
- Layout: FF layout
- Related: Lloyd 400

Suzulight (Japanese: スズライト) was the brand used for kei cars built by the Suzuki Motor Corporation from 1955 to 1969. They were Suzuki's first entry into automotive manufacturing, having previously only produced motorcycles. It was Japan's second front-wheel drive car, after the very limited production Tsukuba-go of the 1930s. The Suzulight sedans and light vans all had transversely mounted engines and front-wheel drive. The Suzulight Carry trucks and vans were the first to use the Carry label, still around today.

== Suzulight SF series ==
Introduced in October 1955, "SF" stood for "Suzuki Four-wheel car". Work had begun in January 1954, with a front-engine, rear-wheel-drive and rear-engined design also considered. The first Suzuki was closely based on the Lloyd 400, chosen after Suzuki also having considered the Citroën 2CV and Renault 4CV. The Suzulight SF shared the Lloyd's transversely mounted, front-wheel drive layout and the two-cylinder, two-stroke engine was a narrow-bored copy of the Lloyd's, using the same 66.0 mm (2.60 in) stroke. Thanks to a smaller bore of 58.9 mm (2.32 in) and resulting 359.66 cc (21.9 cu in) swept volume, it met the Japanese Keijidosha ("light car") legislation. The SF had drum brakes all around, was 2,990 mm (117.7 in) long, 1,295 mm (51.0 in) wide and 1,400 mm (55.1 in) tall, with a 2,000 mm (78.7 in) wheelbase and a 1,050 mm (41.3 in) front and rear wheel track. Its design was by the company's founder Michio Suzuki. When introduced, the SF also had double wishbone coil-sprung suspension front and rear, with rack-and-pinion steering, features which were far ahead of their time. Just like the Lloyd which inspired it, the Suzulight featured a chassis consisting of a central tube with the suspension attached to each end of the tube. Type approval was issued on July 20, 1955, and sales began three months later.

The introduction of the Suzulight SF series also dovetailed with the "People's Car Program" which had been recently announced by Japan's Ministry of International Trade and Industry (MITI). This established a goal for the Japanese auto industry of producing "a four-seater with a top speed of 100 km/h, priced at ¥150,000," in order to speed up the motorization of the country.

When it first went on sale, in October 1955, three body styles were listed as being on offer:

- Suzulight SS (sedan) — ¥420,000 (only 43 Suzulight SS were built)
- Suzulight SL (light van) — ¥390,000
- Suzulight SP (pickup) — ¥370,000

A fourth bodystyle, the roomier SD Delivery Van, was added in November 1955. The pickup was the first ever bonneted Kei truck, although only 30-50 of these were built. In April 1956, the engine bore was increased to 59 mm (2.3 in), making for a 360.88 cc (22.0 cu in) displacement. Power was up by two PS, to 18 (13 kW). Since the Suzulight's modern suspension was unable to cope with the Japanese roads of the time, the wishbones and coil springs were replaced with leaf springs on all corners at the same time, while the SS sedan version was withdrawn. In November Suzuki took notice of the fact that Japanese tire manufacturers, who had hitherto not made any tires smaller than 16 inches, had begun making 14-inch tires. While the wheel wells remained rather large for a three-meter car, making for inefficient space utilization, the Suzulight's appearance became considerably more harmonious with smaller wheels.

Small-scale series production began in October 1955, with 3-4 cars being built per month. By February 1956, however, monthly production had jumped to about 30 cars.

In January 1958, after sluggish sales and to take advantage of economies of scale, the range was whittled down to a single model. A fifteen percent sales tax on passenger cars had recently been introduced, making the SS a hard sell, and the pickup's limited payload and sales conspired against it. The "SL" Light Van remained; its owner could also easily install a proper rear seat to circumvent the taxation rule. With two seats plus an auxiliary seat, a 200 kg (441 lb) payload, and a standard two-tone paintjob, it was also referred to as the "Suzulight SF Light Van" in period brochures. Although looking a lot like a modern hatchback in design, this was considerably more utilitarian in nature. Production ended in July 1959 with the introduction of the Suzulight TL Light Van. Production of the commercial use Suzulight SF series were 101 in 1956, followed by 385 examples in 1957, 454 in 1958. 1,115 Suzukis intended for commercial use were built in 1959, but the lion's share of that year's production consisted of the succeeding TL series.

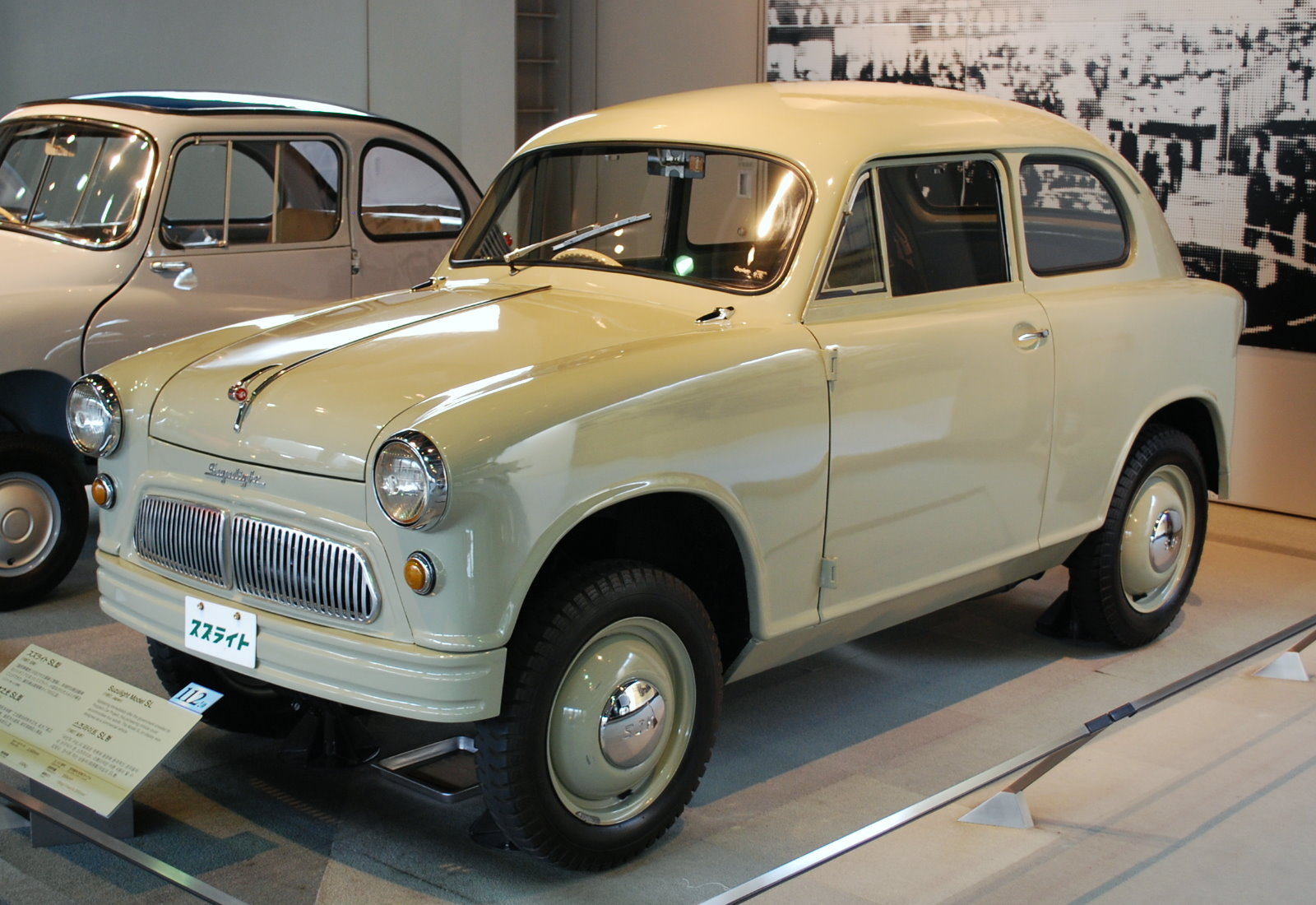
1957 Suzulight SL Light Van

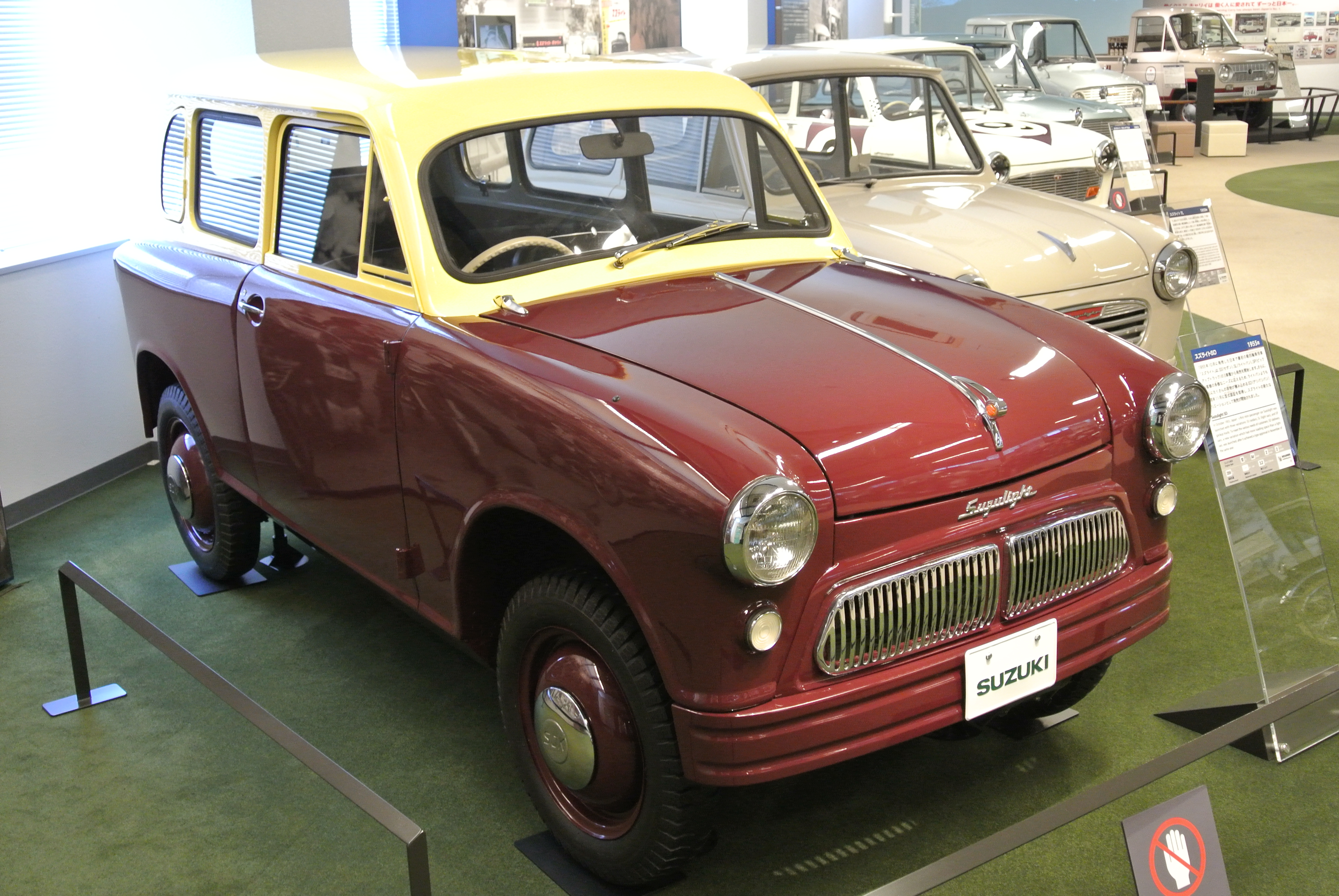
1956-1958 Suzulight SD (delivery van)

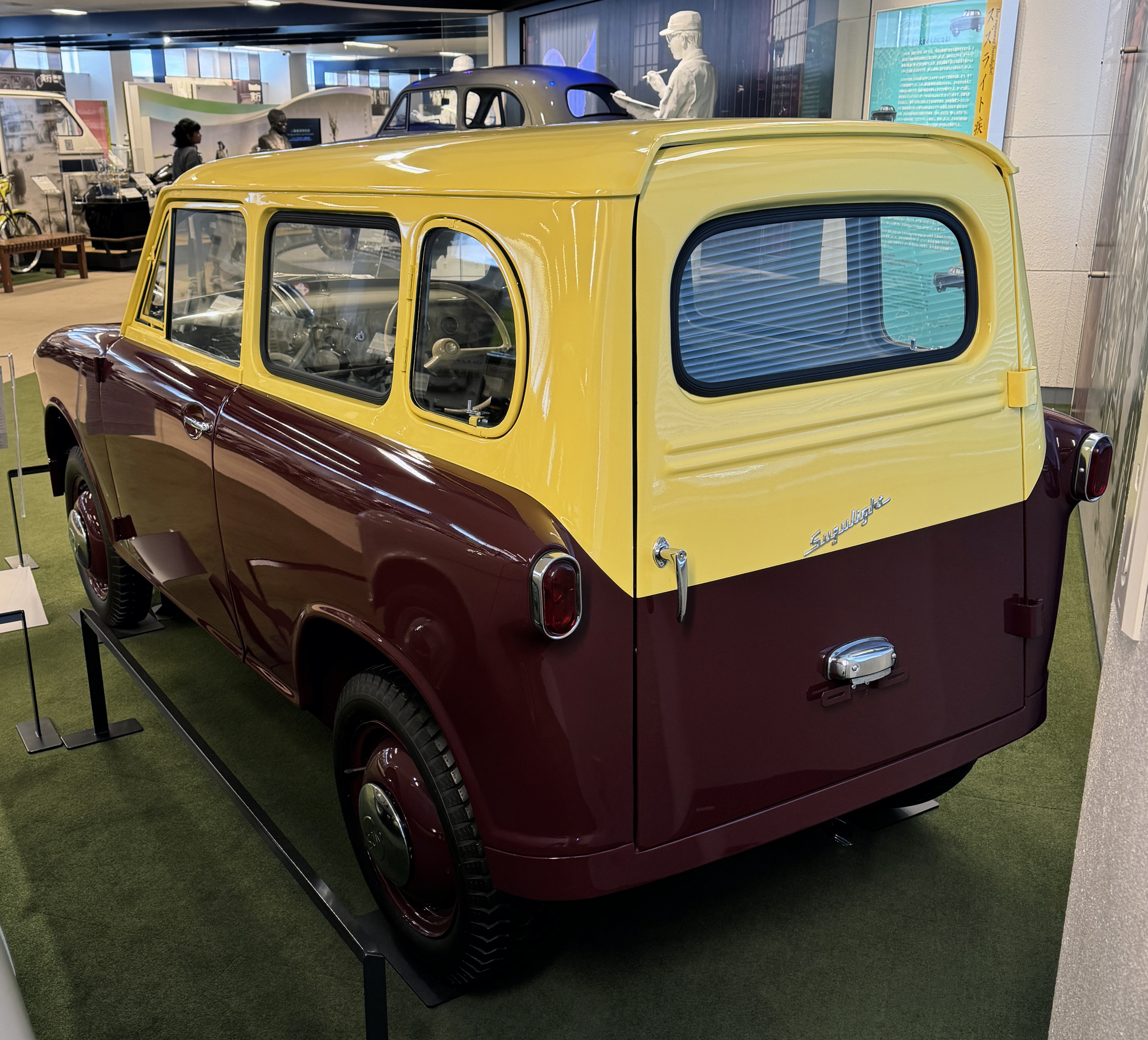
Suzulight SD; rear view

=== Data ===
Suzulight SF Series
Model	1955 Suzulight SS Sedan	1958 Suzulight SF Light Van
Engine	In-line 2 cylinder, air-cooled two-stroke	
Bore and stroke	58.9 mm × 66.0 mm (2.32 in × 2.60 in)	59.0 mm × 66.0 mm (2.32 in × 2.60 in)
Displacement	359.66 cc (21.9 cu in)	360.88 cc (22.0 cu in)
Power	16 PS (12 kW) at 4,000 rpm	18 PS (13 kW) at 4,000 rpm
Torque	3.2 kg⋅m (31 N⋅m; 23 lb⋅ft) at 2,800 rpm	3.2 kg⋅m (31 N⋅m; 23 lb⋅ft) at 3,200 rpm
Weight	SS/SL/SD: 520 kg or 1,146 lb (SP: 500 kg or 1,102 lb)	500 kg or 1,102 lb
Transmission	Column mounted 3-speed manual, FF layout	
Suspension (front/rear)	coil sprung double wishbone	horizontal leaf springs
Tires	4.00-16-4PR	4.50-14-4PR
Top speed	85 km/h or 53 mph (commercials: 80 km/h or 50 mph)	80 km/h or 50 mph

== Suzulight 360 ==
Comparison Mini/Suzulight TL
	Mini Mark I	Suzulight TL
length (mm)	3,050	2,990
width (mm)	1,400	1,295
height (mm)	1,350	1,380
wheelbase (mm)	2,030	2,050
wheels	5.20—10	4.50—12
weight (kg)	572	490

In July 1959 (on sale by October), the new Suzulight TL was introduced, replacing the SF. Only available with a split folding rear seat and a large tailgate opening to the side, its layout was far ahead of its time. With rear seats folded, the TL could take 1 cubic metre (1.3 cu yd) or 300 kg (661 lb), fifty per cent more than the SL had been able to accommodate and with higher comfort for the occupants. With 12-inch wheels having recently become commercially available in Japan, Suzuki produced a modern glassy design with one of each at every corner, very reminiscent of the Mini introduced one month later (see size comparison on right). The design, by Tadaaki Mizuki, was the result of trying to save space while using a minimum number of compound curve pressings. The 360 cc engine, tubular chassis, and column mounted three-speed transmission were lightly modified carryovers from the SF, but power was up to 21 PS (15 kW).

The interior was spartan. One publicity blurb of the era mentions such luxuries as "synchronized wipers", "a lever-operated winker switch", a fuel gauge, and "self-starter activated by turning the ignition key". There was only one, central taillight. The 1959-1960 TLs were not even available with a passenger side windshield wiper. Nonetheless, the mostly handbuilt Suzulight TL Van was the most expensive car in its class, at ¥398,000. Meanwhile, the Subaru 360 Commercial cost ¥365,000 and a Cony 360 Truck a mere ¥330,000.

On 26 November 1959, Typhoon Vera destroyed Suzuki's assembly plant. Afterwards, Suzuki quickly built a new assembly line factory (finished only four months later) and were thus able to build many more TLs than the original goal of 200 per month. Sales in 1960 were 6075, of which 5824 were TLs, against nearly twice as many Subaru 360 and 23,417 Mazda R360 Coupés. Nonetheless, this equalled about five times the total number built of the preceding SF series. By the end of 1960, monthly production had reached 1000, while it was up to 1500 per month by March 1962.

=== Development ===
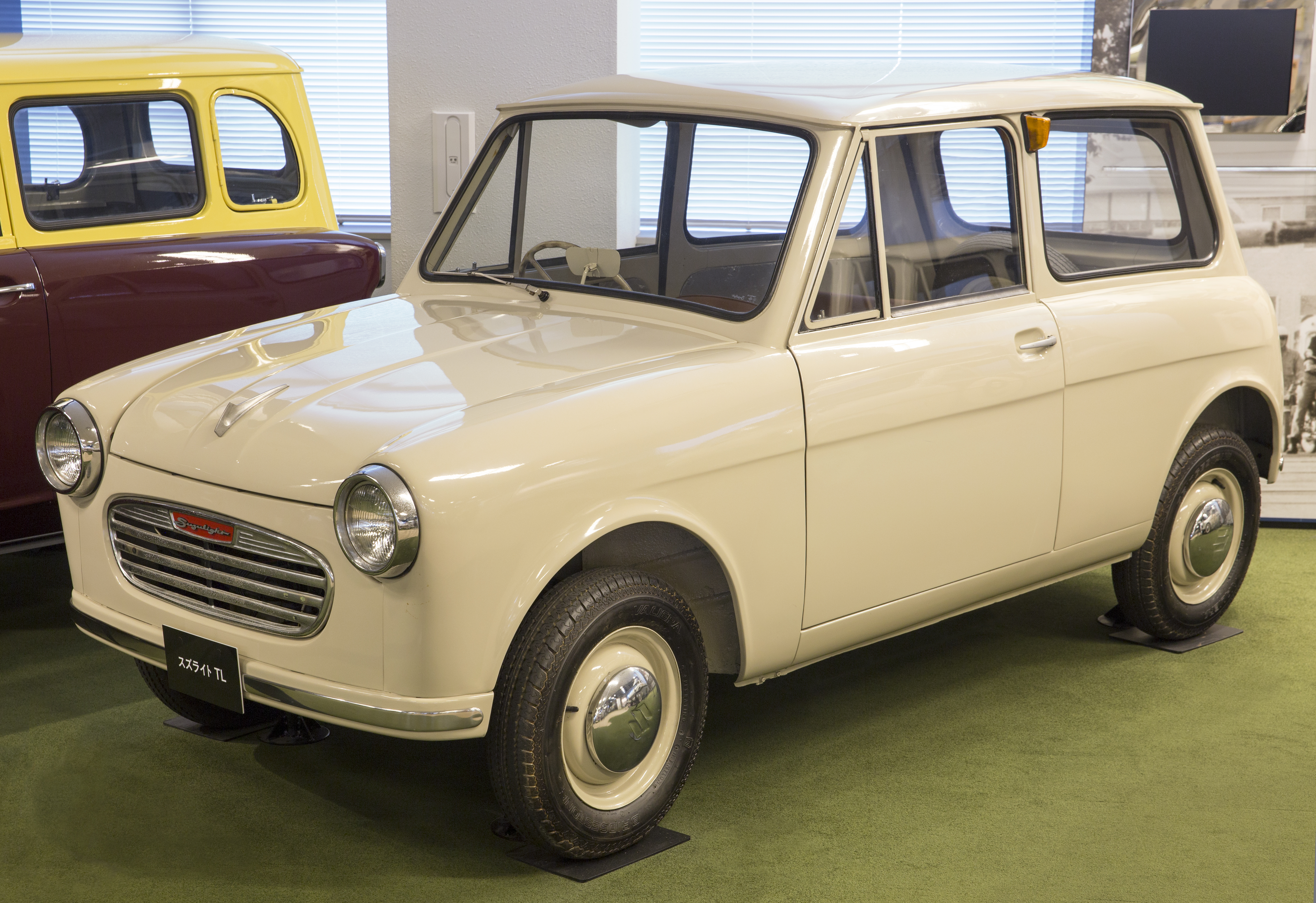
1960-1961 Suzulight 360 Van (TL II)

During 1960, the Suzulight TL II was presented. A new pressed steel grille in place of the TL's simple mesh, and chrome rubbing strips on the bumpers enhanced its look, and there was also a second windshield wiper. The engine received some improvements such as larger bearings and the gear linkage was change from a cable operated one to a more precise mechanical linkage. The price dropped to ¥360,000. Next year's TL III, introduced in October 1961, continued this trend, dropping down to ¥345,000 while offering a new, fully synchronized four-speed transmission. The TL III also received an updated dash and turn signals integrated into a new grille and taillights instead of on the B-pillar. The sheet metal was changed to accommodate new doorhandles, but the biggest difference was at the rear, where there was a horizontally split two-piece tailgate. The TL III was marketed as the "Suzulight Van 360".

The TL Van was exported in small numbers, with English-language brochures printed. A single car was sent to New York City in 1960, with the intent of putting the TL on sale in the United States for $1,300. In 1962, 238 examples were assembled in Arica, Chile. 150 of these were classified as "Stations" and the remaining 88 as "furgones", i.e. small vans. It is unknown how these relate to the single model available in Japan, a light van with a folding rear seat.

=== FE engine ===
In March 1963 the Suzulight series received an all new engine. Still an air-cooled, two-stroke two-cylinder, the FE was based on the FB which had been introduced in the Suzulight Carry FB in late 1961. With a 61.0 x 61.5 mm bore and stroke, for a total 359 cc (21.9 cu in) displacement, power and torque remained the same as for the TL. The biggest improvement was the introduction of Suzuki's patented "SELMIX" inlet automatic lubrication system. This eliminated the need for pre-mixed gasoline, improving convenience, economy, and reliability. It was offered as a Standard (FEB, ¥345,000 - this basic version did not receive the SELMIX system) or DeLuxe (FE, ¥360,000), with yet another new grille design. The Fronte FEA cost ¥380,000. Vans have a five-digit chassis number (FE*****) while Frontes have a six-digit one (FEA1*****).

Soon thereafter the rear end was redesigned, becoming very square and van-like. This kept the appearance of the Suzulight Van quite modern, and sliding open rear windows made the rear a more comfortable place to be. For November 1964, the rear wheel housings became larger. In April 1965 the Fronte's front end was reworked (October for the Van), with the headlights now incorporated into the grille (FE2/FEA2). From February 1966, these versions also received an engine with Suzuki's improved CCI lubrication system. While the Fronte was discontinued in 1967, the Van received another minor facelift in March 1968, becoming the FE3 (beginning with chassis number FE69001). This incorporated some minor engine modifications (now with reed valves) and a switch to an all-red interior, excepting the plentiful exposed metal.

In January 1969, the Suzulight Van was replaced by the conventionally laid out Suzuki Fronte Van (LS10). Having been an early adopter of front-wheel-drive, Suzuki now embraced more traditional layouts and was not to build another such car for over ten years, until the May 1979 introduction of the SS30/SS40 Alto and Fronte.

== Suzulight Fronte ==
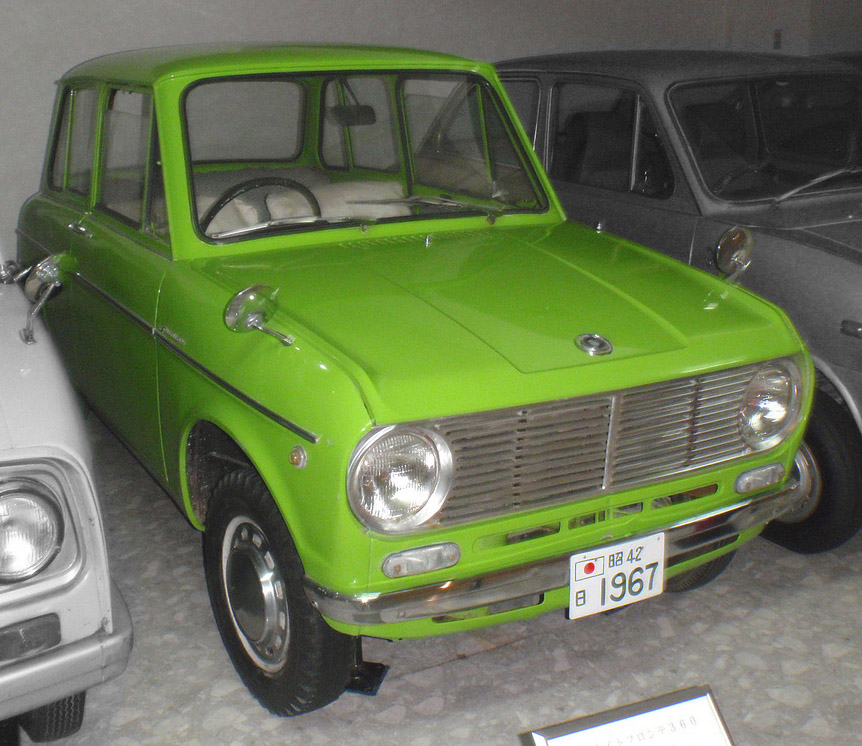
Late (1967) Suzulight Fronte

In March 1962, the TL-based Fronte TLA passenger car appeared. The name was meant to symbolize Suzuki's position at the front of Kei car development, as well as alluding to its FF layout. The Fronte received a different grille from its working sister as well as a reworked rear end, with a top-hinged trunk lid (later bottom-hinged) and roll-down rear windows. Softer springs and a more plush interior made it more comfortable. Developments generally mirrored those of the Van versions, until the LC10 Fronte replaced it in 1967.

== End of Suzulight ==
The first four-wheeled Suzuki sold under the company's own name rather than as a Suzulight was the Suzuki Fronte 800, presented in August 1965. In 1967, when introducing the LC10 Fronte, Suzuki Motor Company chose to market this too under the "Suzuki" brand, even though it was a light (kei) car. This also made marketing easier, with Suzuki no longer having to split their resources on two different brand names.

Certified to Mechanical Engineering Heritage (Japan) No. 132, in 2025.
