= Suzuki Ciaz =

Subcompact sedan produced by Suzuki (2014-2025)

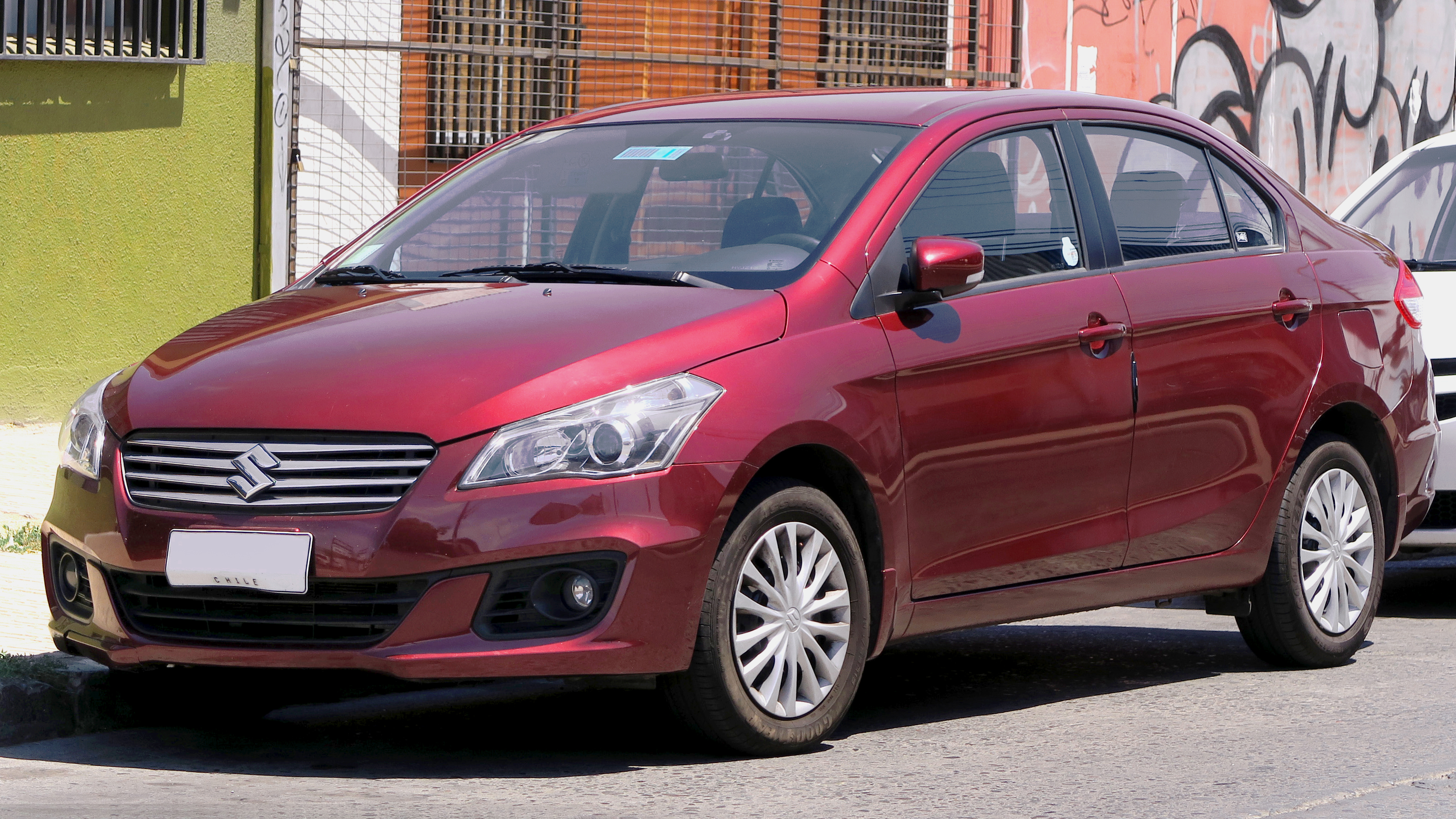

Overview
- Manufacturer: Suzuki
- Model code: AVB
- Also called: Suzuki Alivio (China); Toyota Belta (Africa); Oshan Qiyue (China, 2022–2023)
- Production: August 2014 – April 2025 (Suzuki); 2021–2025 (Toyota); 2014–2018, 2022–2023 (China)
- Assembly: India: Manesar (Maruti Suzuki); Thailand: Rayong (Suzuki Motor Thailand); China: Chongqing (Changan Suzuki); Myanmar: Thilawa (Suzuki Thilawa Motor)

Body and chassis
- Class: Subcompact car (B)
- Body style: 4-door sedan
- Layout: Front-engine, front-wheel-drive
- Related: Suzuki Ertiga (AVI); Suzuki Swift (AZG)

Powertrain
- Engine: Petrol: 1.2 L K12B I4 (Thailand); 1.4 L K14B I4; 1.5 L K15B I4 (MHEV; India); 1.6 L M16A I4 (China); Diesel: 1.3 L D13A I4 TD (India); 1.3 L D13A I4 TD (MHEV; India); 1.5 L E15A I4 TD (India)
- Transmission: 5-speed manual; 6-speed manual (India); 4-speed automatic; 6-speed automatic (China); CVT (Thailand)
- Hybrid drivetrain: SHVS mild hybrid

Dimensions
- Wheelbase: 2,650 mm (104.3 in)
- Length: 4,490–4,545 mm (176.8–178.9 in)
- Width: 1,730 mm (68.1 in)
- Height: 1,485 mm (58.5 in)
- Curb weight: 960–1,130 kg (2,116.4–2,491.2 lb)

Chronology
- Predecessor: Suzuki SX4 sedan; Toyota Yaris sedan (for Toyota Belta)

The Suzuki Ciaz is a subcompact sedan produced by Suzuki from 2014 to 2025. It was developed to replace the Suzuki SX4 sedan in several Asian, African and Latin American markets. It went on sale for the first time in India, the largest market for Suzuki in September 2014.

The Ciaz has been rebadged and marketed by Toyota as the Toyota Belta since 2021 for certain African markets.

The "Ciaz" name stands for "Comfort, Intelligence, Attitude and Zeal", or "City from A to Z".

== Overview ==
The Ciaz was previewed as the Suzuki Ciaz Concept in 2014 Auto Expo India. It was also revealed in the Beijing Motor Show in April 2014 as the Suzuki Alivio, in a near-production guise. Launched in September 2014, the Suzuki Ciaz is one of the largest car in the segment with 4,490 mm in length, 1,730 mm in width, 1,485 mm in height. The car sits on a 2,650 mm wheelbase which is said to be C-segment territory, although Suzuki positioned the Ciaz against the B-segment sedans in most markets. The boot space of 510-litres and it is claimed to be the largest in its class.

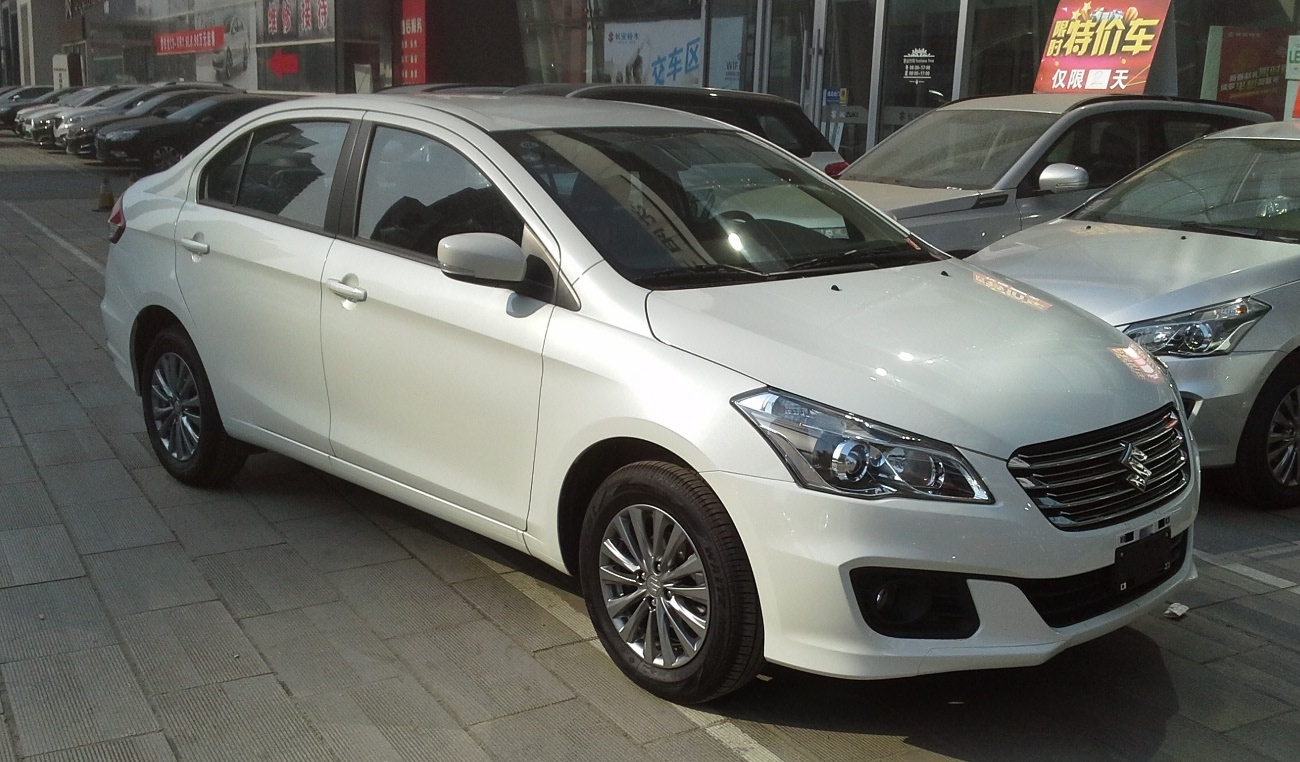
Suzuki Alivio (China; pre-facelift)

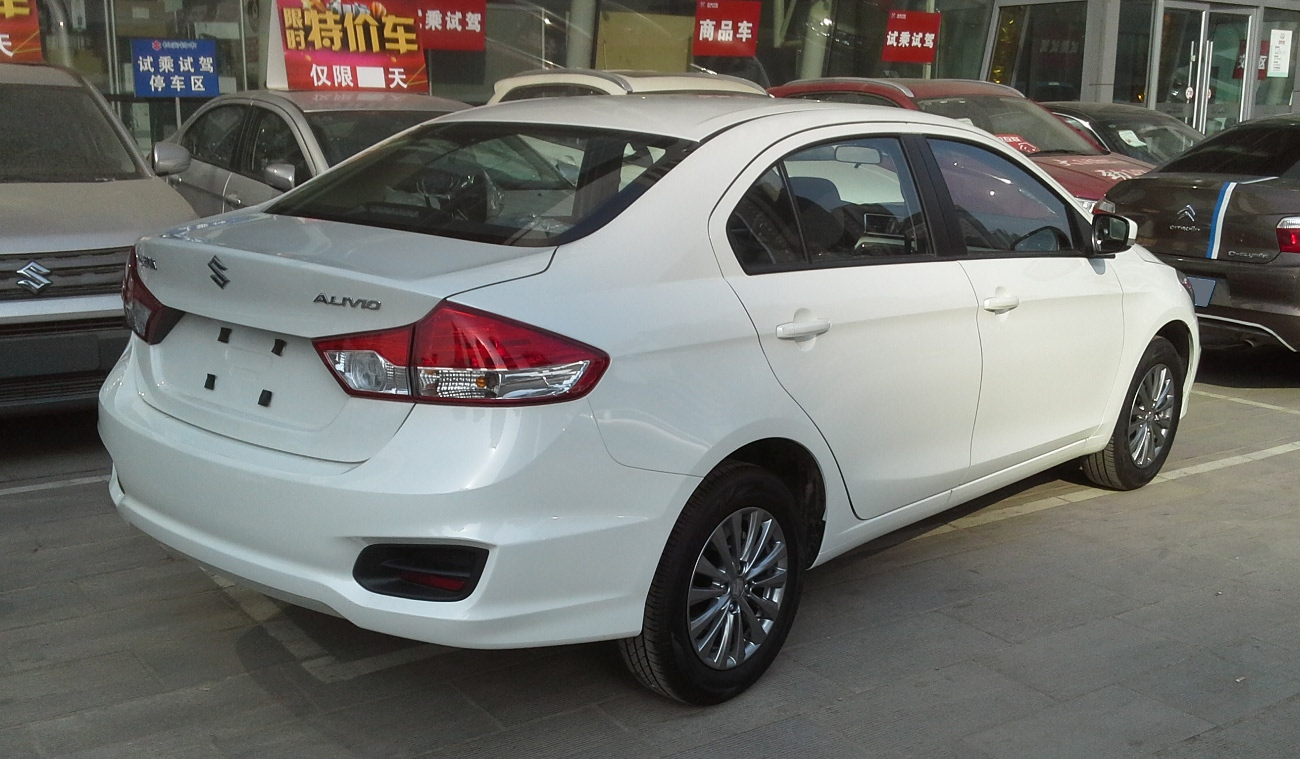
Suzuki Alivio (China; pre-facelift)

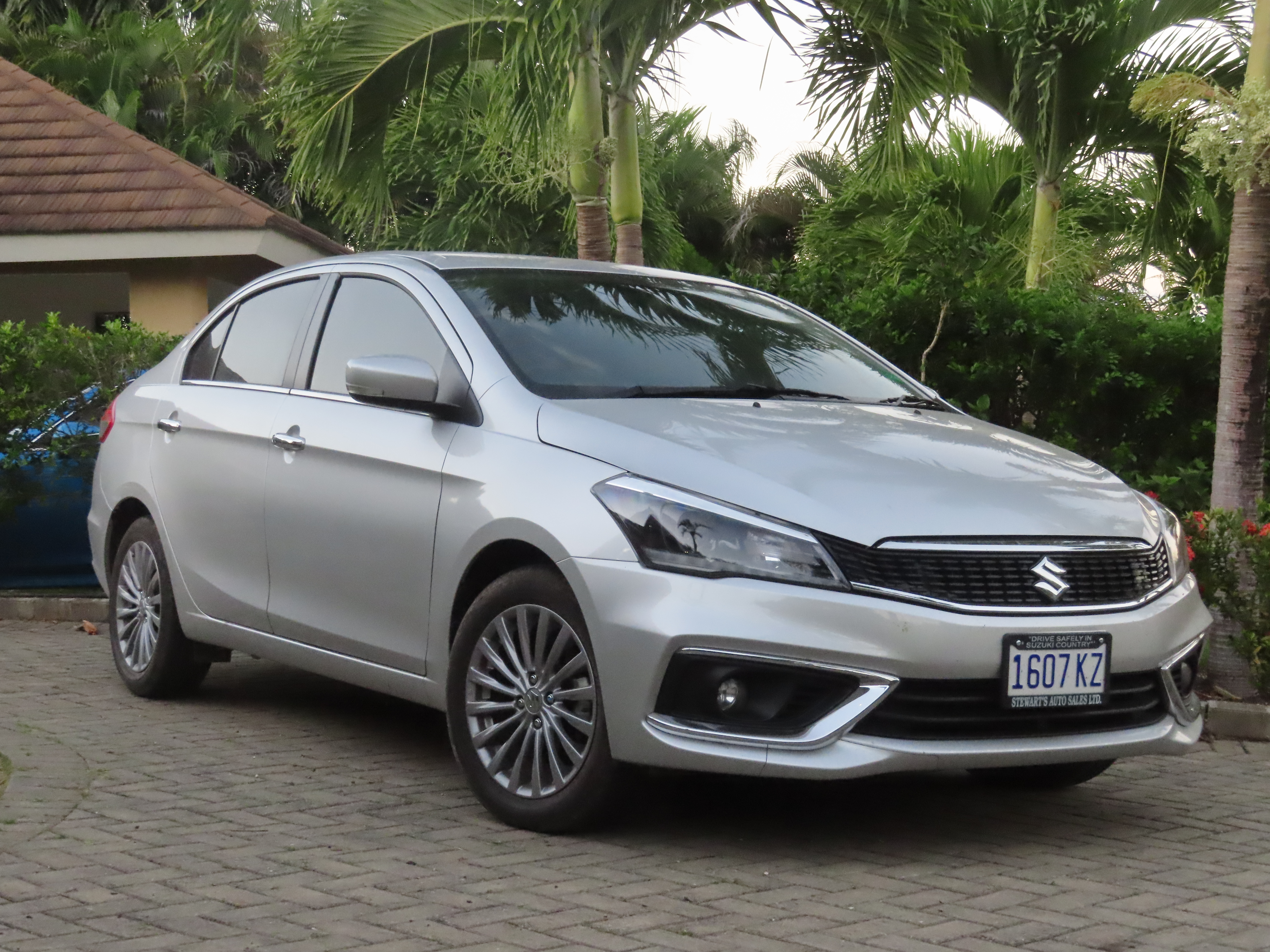
Suzuki Ciaz (Jamaica; facelift)

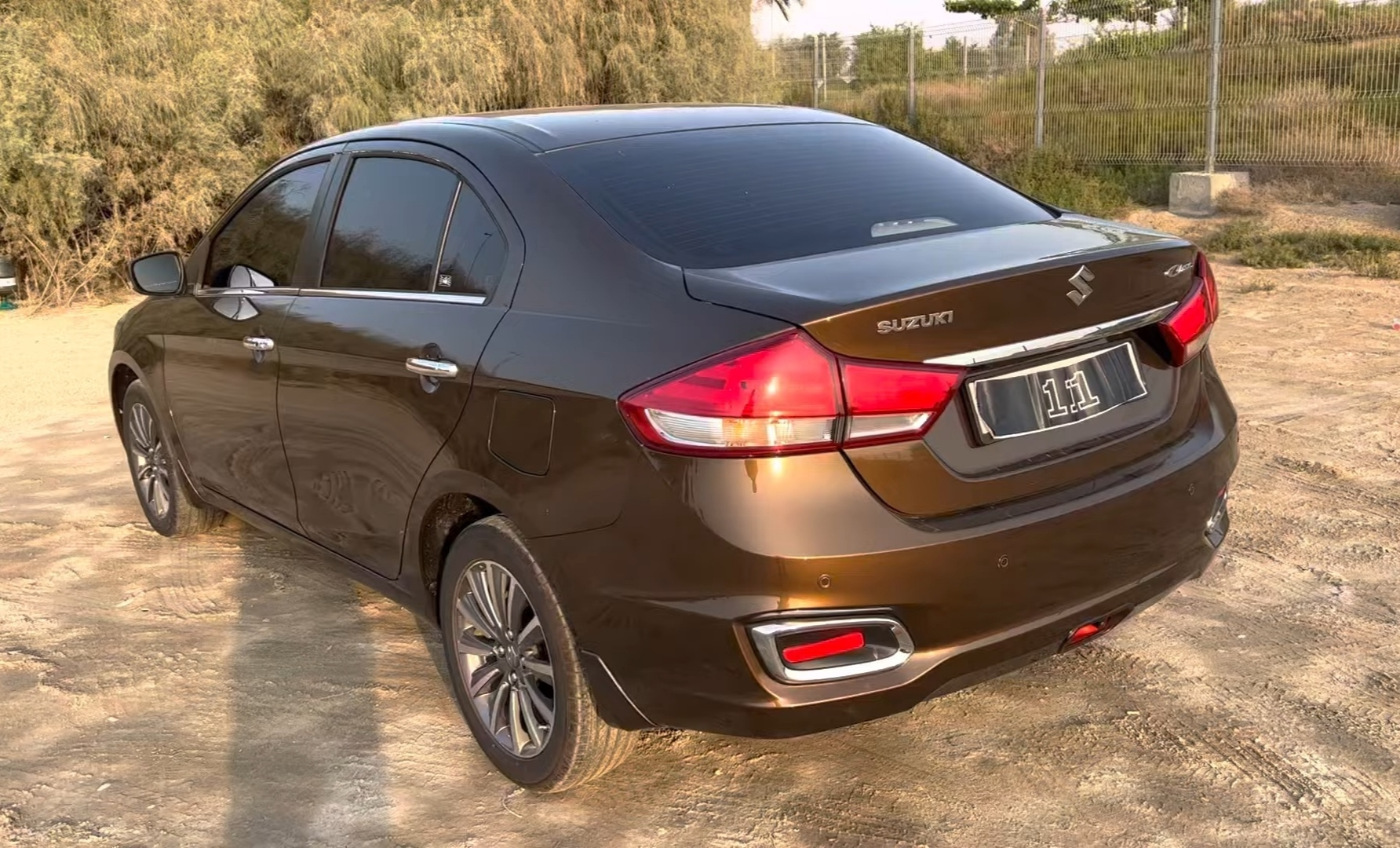
Suzuki Ciaz (UAE; facelift)

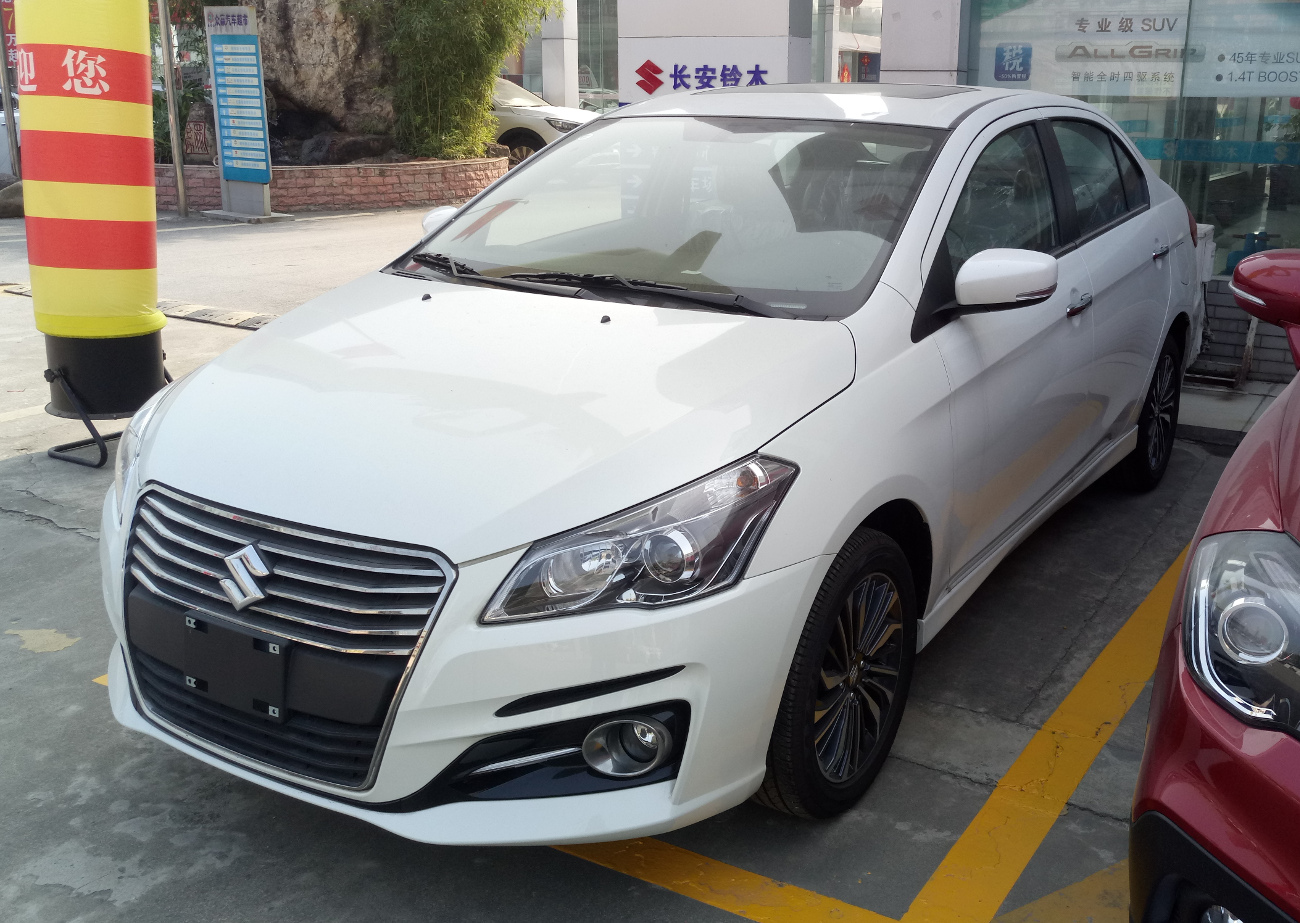
Suzuki Alivio (China; facelift)

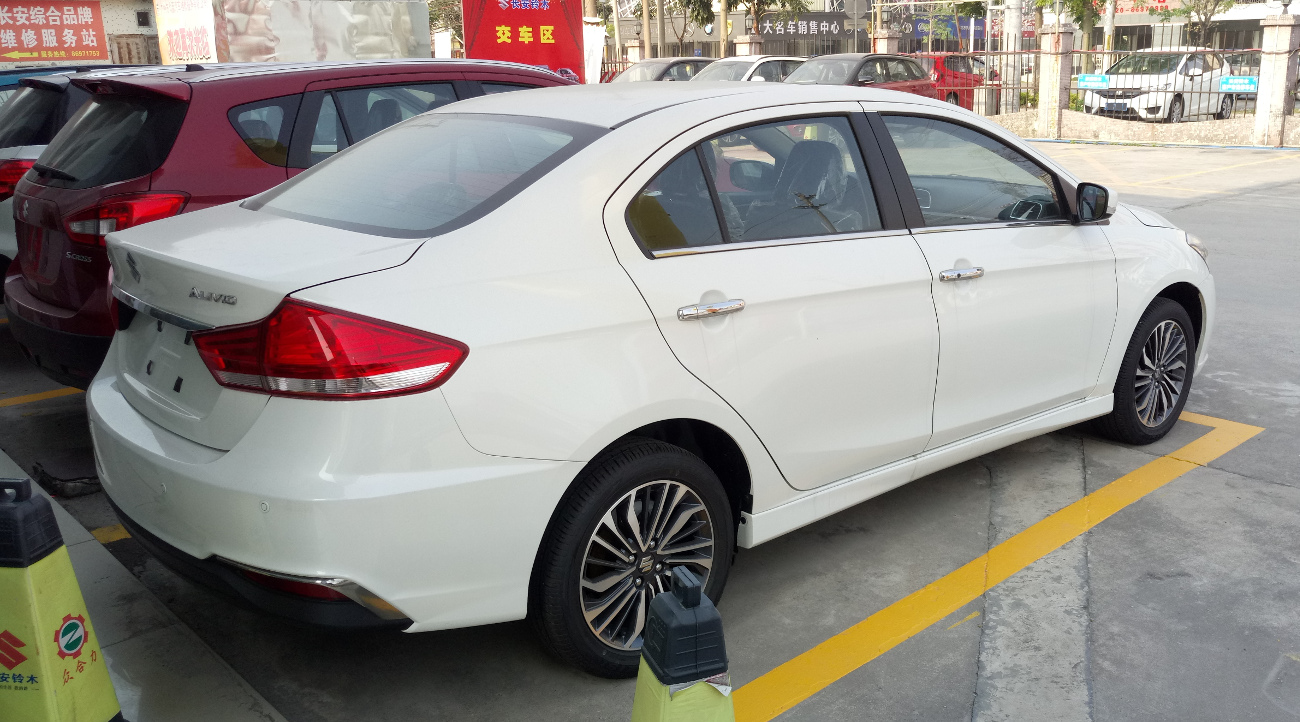
Suzuki Alivio (China; facelift)

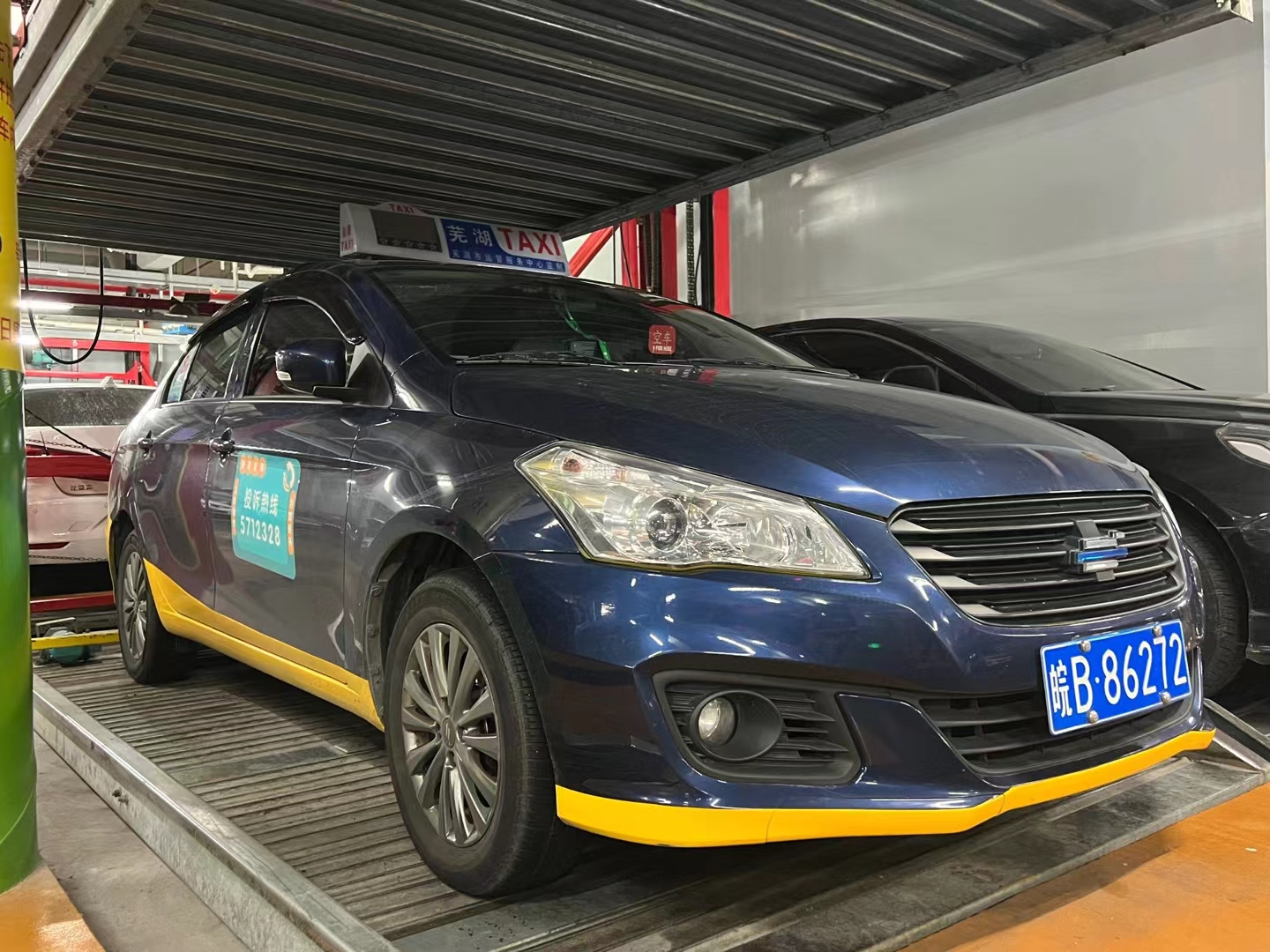
Oshan Qiyue Taxi (China)

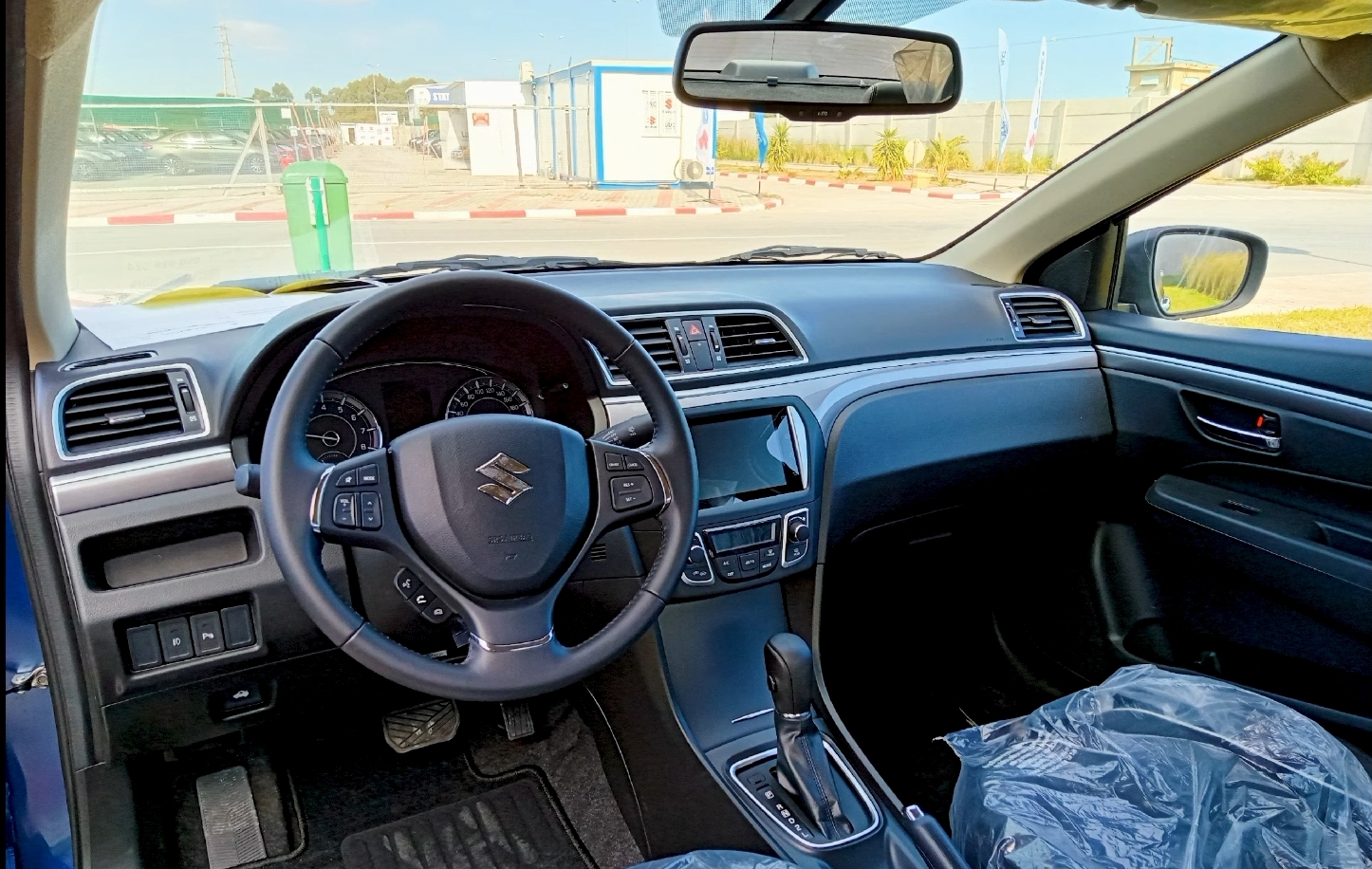
Interior

== Markets ==
=== India ===
In India, the Ciaz replaced the SX4 sedan which was marketed in the country simply as the Maruti Suzuki SX4. Released to the market in October 2014, the Ciaz belongs to the B-segment sedan market which is commonly referred as the "mid-size sedan" category in the country, above the Indian "compact sedan" segment which is typically less than 4 meter in length. Maruti Suzuki was targeting the Ciaz as the market leader in the category while also attempting to expand the segment sales volume.

The Ciaz was initially available with two engines – 1.4-litre 4-cylinder K14B with 95 PS (94 hp; 70 kW) and 130 N⋅m (13 kg⋅m; 96 lb⋅ft) along with a Fiat Multijet 1.3-litre 4-cylinder diesel rated at 90 PS (89 hp; 66 kW) and 200 N⋅m (20 kg⋅m; 148 lb⋅ft) of torque. The diesel model is rated at 26.21 km/L (3.8 L/100 km; 61.6 mpg_{‑US}) while the petrol variant is claimed to be able to do 20.73 km/L (4.8 L/100 km; 48.8 mpg_{‑US}) per ARAI standards. Maruti Suzuki claimed it has tweaked the ECU and mapped throttle response differently for the petrol Ciaz for better performance and efficiency. The petrol engine is available with 4-speed automatic and 5-speed manual, while the diesel one is available only in 5-speed manual.

In September 2015, the mild-hybrid version of the diesel Ciaz was launched. Marketed as the SHVS (Smart Hybrid Vehicle by Suzuki), the fuel economy is improved by employing an ISG (integrated starter generator) that offers engine power assistance using the motor. The ISG also provides assistance to the engine start-stop technology that automatically stops the engine during traffic light, and starts when the clutch is released. The claimed fuel economy is improved to 28.09 km/L (3.6 L/100 km; 66.1 mpg_{‑US}).

Since April 2017, Maruti Suzuki moved the Ciaz sales and distribution from the regular Arena dealerships to Nexa dealerships, a network of dealership outlets for Maruti Suzuki high-end models. Since its inception in 2015, the dealership network previously only offered the S-Cross and Baleno.

The Ciaz has sold over 270,000 units in India since its launch up to September 2019. The top-end Alpha trim contributes to more than 54 percent of the total sales for the sedan, while the Nexa Blue colour was picked by over 30 percent of Ciaz customers.

==== Facelift ====
In August 2018, the Ciaz received its first facelift. It ditched the 1.4-litre K14B petrol engine in favour of the larger 1.5-litre K15B engine with SHVS producing a power output of 105 PS (104 hp; 77 kW). Later in March 2019, the Fiat-sourced diesel engine was replaced with the in-house 1.5-litre E15A diesel engine rated at 95 PS (94 hp; 70 kW) and 225 N⋅m (23 kg⋅m; 166 lb⋅ft) of torque paired with a 6-speed manual transmission. However, the diesel engine models were short-lived as they were discontinued in February 2020 due to the implementation of Bharat Stage 6 emission standards. In May 2024, the company made it clear that the model won't be excluded from the company lineup even though the sales were lagging compared to the competition. In April 2025, Ciaz was discontinued in India.

=== Thailand ===
The Ciaz was launched in Thailand in July 2015. Manufactured in the Rayong facility, it is equipped with a K12B 1.2-litre engine with 91 hp (92 PS; 68 kW) paired with a CVT automatic transmission to conform with the Eco Car regulation that promises tax breaks for economical cars. Suzuki claimed the Ciaz could achieve 20 km/L (5 L/100 km; 47 mpg_{‑US}) and CO_{2} levels less than 120 g/km. The Rayong plant also produced the Ciaz with the K14B 1.4-litre for exports.

The facelifted version was launched to the market in March 2020.

=== China ===
The car was launched to the market in January 2015 as the Suzuki Alivio with the Chinese name being Qiyue (启悦). Manufactured and marketed by Changan Suzuki, the Alivio is powered by a 1.6-litre G-INNOTEC engine that produces 122 PS (120 hp; 90 kW) and 158 N⋅m (16 kg⋅m; 117 lb⋅ft), paired with a 5-speed manual and 6-speed automatic transmission. The Alivio also comes with an optional electric sunroof. The facelifted version was unveiled in October 2017, with a unique styling that is not applied to the global version of the Ciaz.

Following Suzuki's departure from the Chinese market and the sale of Changan Suzuki to Changan, the Alivio was relaunched in 2022 as the Oshan Qiyue under the Oshan brand, with the Chinese name Qiyue (启悦) emblems now replacing the previous Alivio emblem and styling reverted to the pre-facelift version of the Alivio.

=== Indonesia ===
In Indonesia, the Ciaz was introduced in November 2015 and imported from Thailand. It was only available in GLX trim, powered with a 1.4-litre K14B petrol engine, and paired with either 5-speed manual or 4-speed automatic transmissions.

Due to poor sales, Suzuki stopped sending Ciaz to dealers since December 2017. But the sales continued with special order scheme until mid-2018. Only around 200 units were sold in the country.

=== Philippines ===
In the Philippines, the Ciaz was launched on 13 April 2016. It was initially offered in 2 grades; the base GL and the top GLX, all offered with the 1.4-litre K14B engine paired with either 5-speed manual transmission (GL only) or 4-speed automatic transmission (GL and GLX).

The facelifted Ciaz was launched on 9 July 2021, leaving the 1.4-litre GL with 4-speed automatic transmission as the sole variant at that time.

In March 2022, the Ciaz was discontinued, leaving the Dzire as the only sedan offering in the Suzuki Philippines lineup.

== Toyota Belta ==
The Indian-made Ciaz has been sold under Toyota badge as the Toyota Belta in selected African countries since November 2021 as the replacement of XP150 Yaris sedan. The "Belta" nameplate was previously used for the Japanese domestic market XP90 Vios/Yaris sedan. It serves as an entry-level sedan model positioned below the Toyota Corolla.

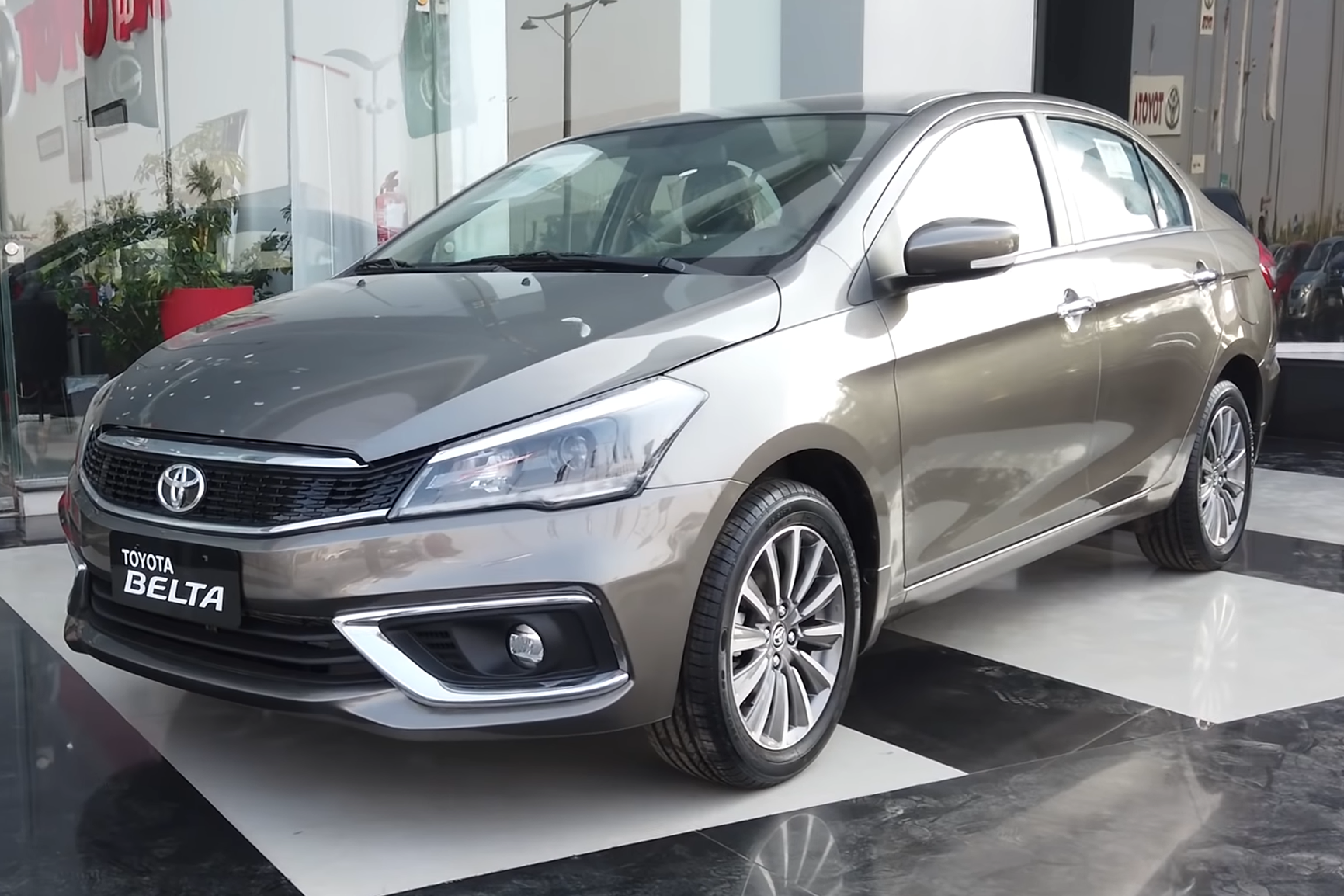
Toyota Belta (Egypt)

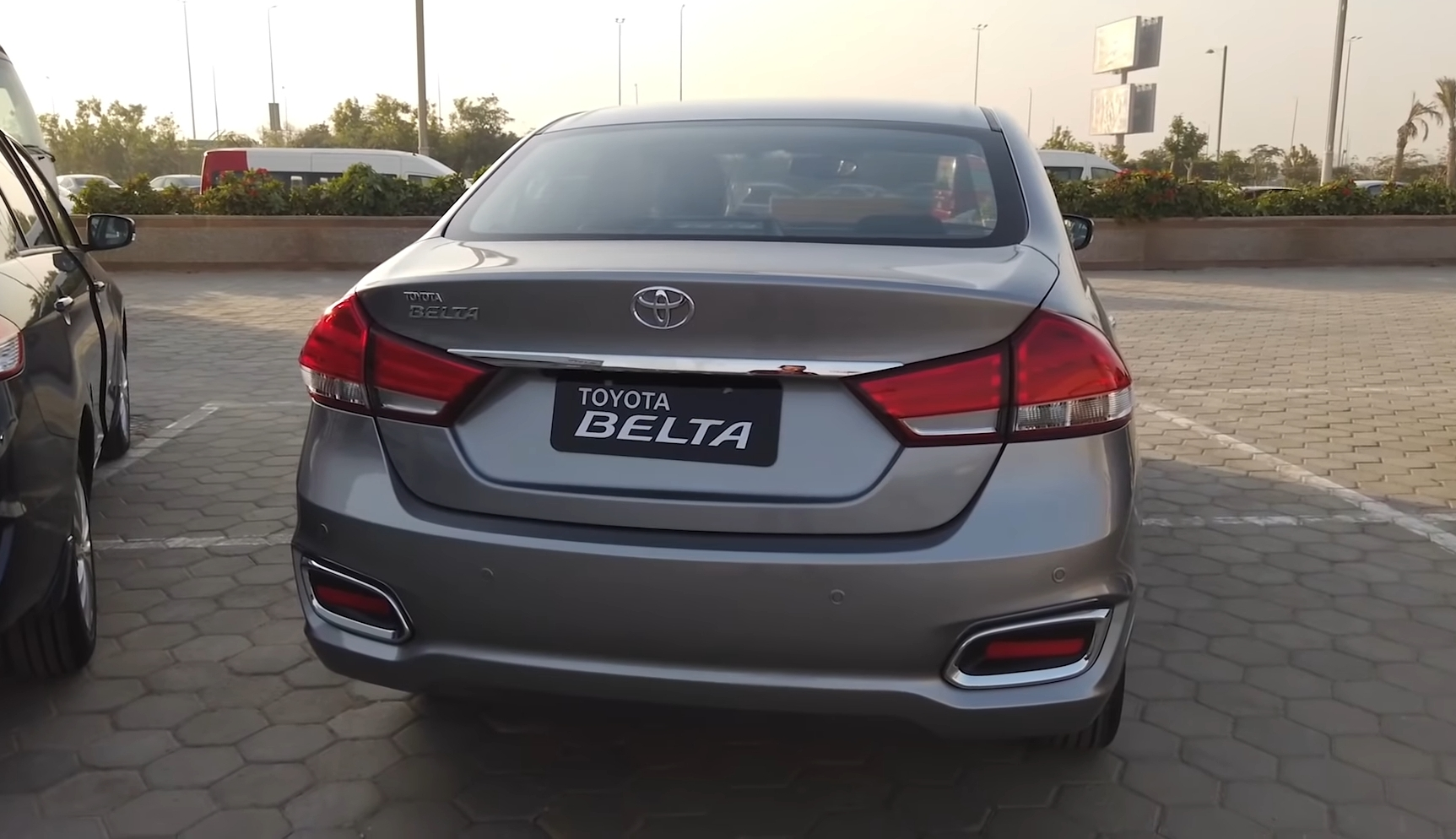
Toyota Belta (Egypt)

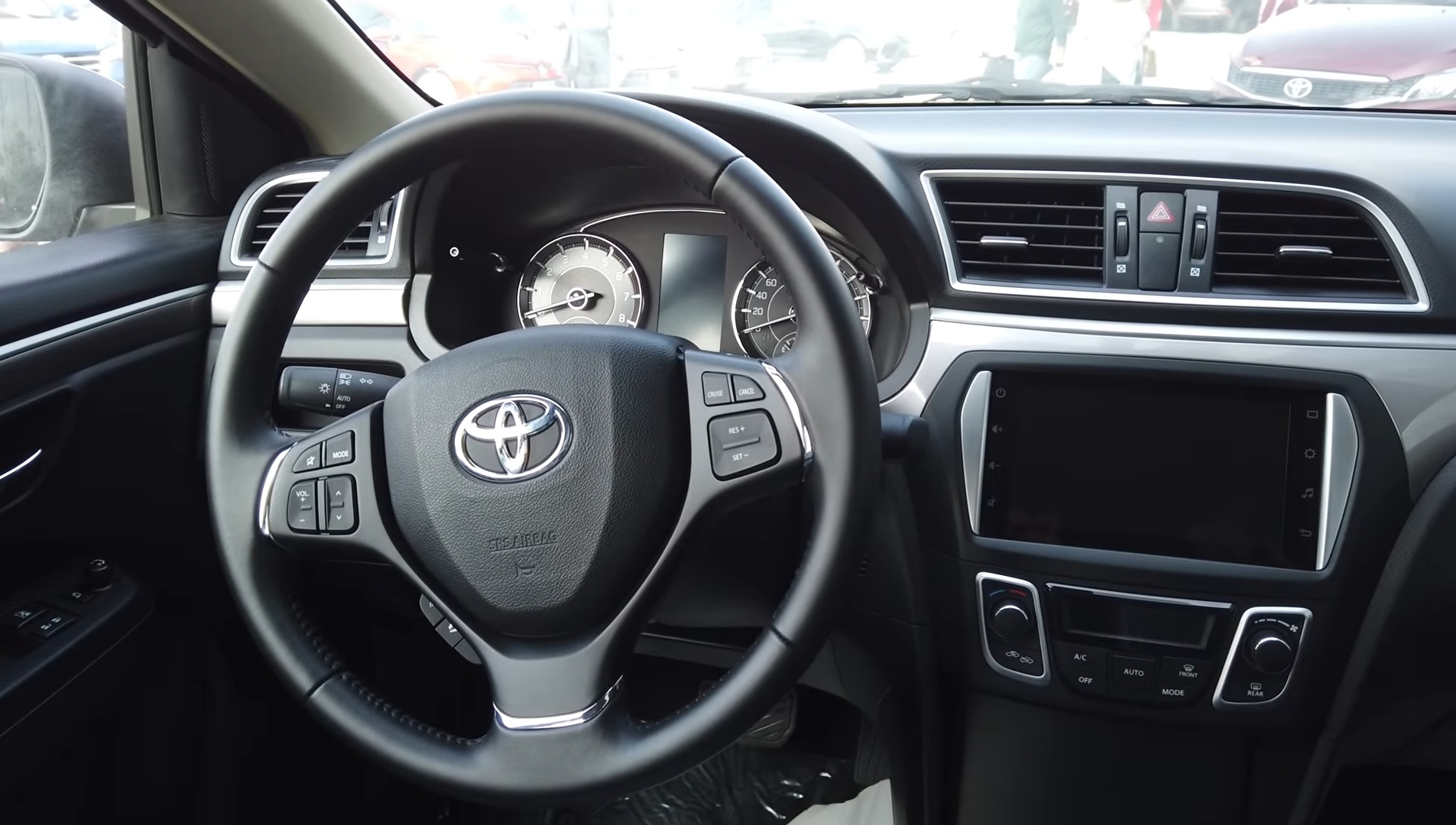
Interior

== Safety ==
=== Global NCAP ===
The Ciaz for India received 1 star for adult occupants and 3 stars for toddlers from Global NCAP 2.5 in a December 2025 testing (similar to Latin NCAP 2019).

Global NCAP 2.5 test results (India) Maruti Suzuki Ciaz (December 2025, similar to Latin NCAP 2019)
Test	Score	Stars
Adult occupant protection	20.86/34.00	1 /5 stars
Child occupant protection	28.57/49.00	3 /5 stars
