= Suzuki FB series engine =

Suzuki FB series
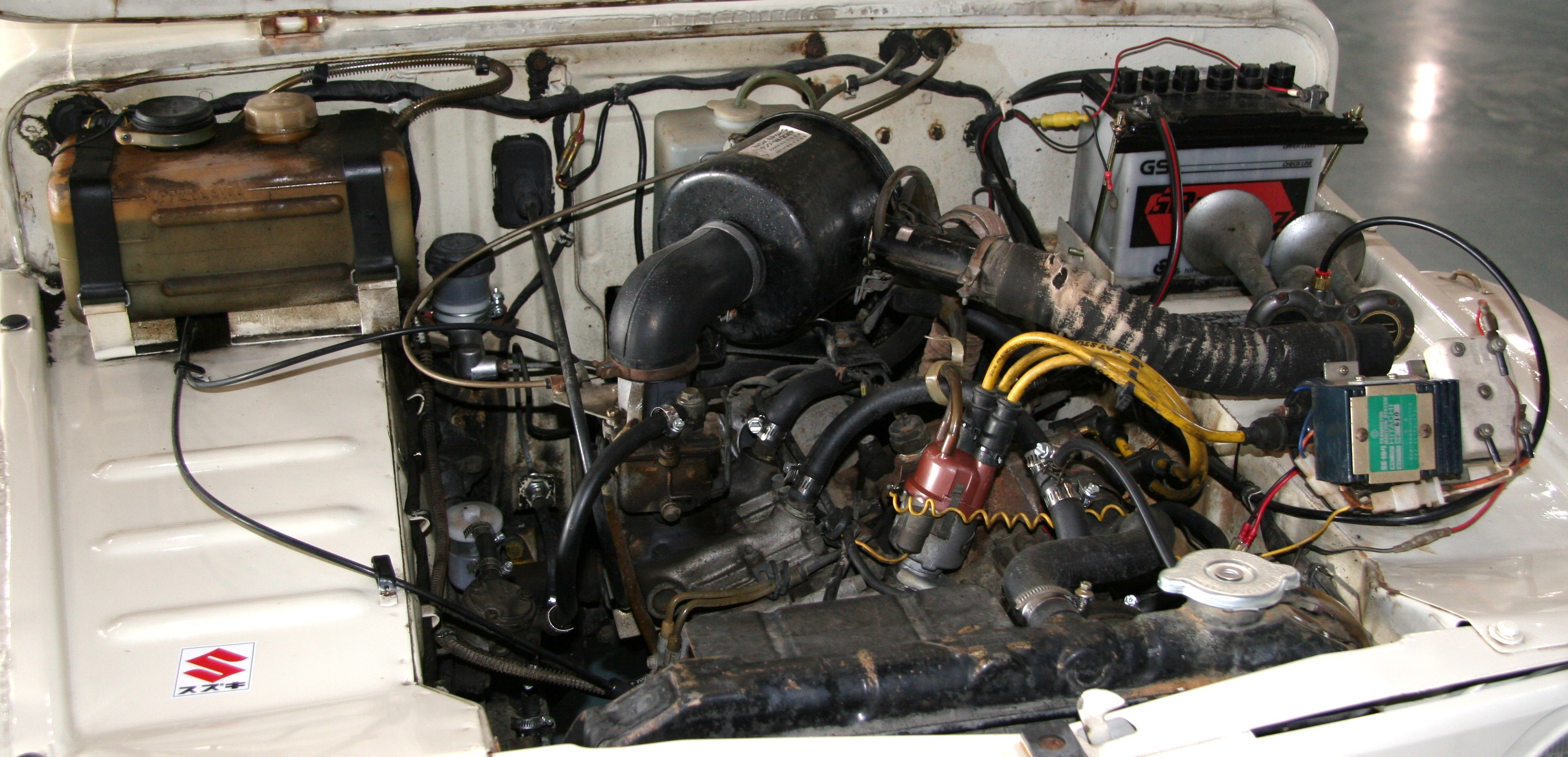
- L50 engine in a Suzuki Jimny (LJ20)

Overview
- Manufacturer: Suzuki
- Production: 1961-1987

Layout
- Configuration: Straight-twin; Straight-three
- Displacement: 359 cc (21.9 cu in); 446 cc (27.2 cu in); 539 cc (32.9 cu in)
- Cylinder bore: 61 mm (2.4 in); 68 mm (2.68 in)
- Piston stroke: 61.5 mm (2.42 in)
- Cylinder block material: Alloy
- Cylinder head material: Alloy
- Compression ratio: 5.9:1, 6.0:1

Combustion
- Fuel system: Mikuni-Solex Carburettor
- Fuel type: Gasoline
- Oil system: Pre-mix; Selmix (automatic inlet injection); CCI/CCIS (automatic crank injection)
- Cooling system: Water-cooled; Air-cooled

Output
- Power output: 21–29 PS (21–29 hp; 15–21 kW)
- Torque output: 36–58 N⋅m (4–6 kg⋅m; 27–43 lb⋅ft)

The Suzuki FB engine is a series of two- and three-cylinder two-stroke engines that was produced by the Suzuki Motor Corporation from October 1961 until November 1987. They were used in a number of Kei-class automobiles and light trucks. From the original air-cooled 359 cc (21.9 cu in) straight-twin version the FB series developed through a number of different models having different names, ending with the water-cooled, three-cylinder LJ50. The names used for various versions of this engine often refer to the chassis code of the cars in which they were introduced, until Suzuki changed their engine naming system sometime in the first half of the 1970s.

== FB ==
The engine was first seen in air-cooled form, equipped with a single carburettor, in the 1961 Suzulight Carry FB. This engine has an alloy block and alloy head, betraying Suzuki's roots as a motorcycle manufacturer. It also received three main bearings. Displacement is 359 cc (21.9 cu in), from a bore and stroke of 61 mm × 61.5 mm (2.40 in × 2.42 in). It originally developed 21 PS (15.4 kW) for this little commercial vehicle. For the June 1965 debut of a modernized Carry, the LC10 engine received a version of the Selmix automatic injection system which acted at the crank. This was later replaced by Suzuki's new self-lubricating "CCI" system (Cylinder Crank Injection). For the cabover L30 Carry of 1966, a horizontally mounted version of the engine was developed on which the starter and generator are combined and mounted directly to the front of the crankshaft.

In 1969 a reed valve equipped version with increased power was first offered in the L40 Carry. Power increased to 25 PS (18.4 kW) at 6000 rpm, with a Solex-style horizontal draught Mikuni 30 PHD carburettor. This engine also equipped the brand new LJ10 Jimny off-roader. A 27 PS (19.9 kW) (still at 6000 rpm) version of the FB engine, now featuring Suzuki's improved "CCIS" (Cylinder Crank Injection System) lubrication system, appeared in the Jimny in January 1971 and subsequently in the Carry in April of the same year. Fitted with the same carburettor as before, torque is 3.7 kg⋅m (36 N⋅m; 27 lb⋅ft) at 5000 rpm. This version of the engine weighs 50 kg (110 lb), excluding the transmission. The original air-cooled FB engine was discontinued in August 1972 (when the L40 van was replaced), as water-cooled engines were becoming more popular in the Kei segment.

Applications

- 1961.10–1965.06 Suzulight Carry FB/FBD
- 1965.06–1969.07 Suzulight/Suzuki Carry L20/L21
- 1966.02–1969.07 Suzuki Carry L30/L31
- 1969.07–1972.08 Suzuki Carry L40/L41
- 1971.01–1972.03 Suzuki Jimny LJ10

== FE ==
In 1963, a version for the front-wheel drive Suzulight 360 Van appeared. When intended for a FF layout, the engine was called the FE. The biggest improvement was the introduction of Suzuki's patented "SELMIX" automatic lubrication system. This added oil at the inlet and eliminated the need for pre-mixed gasoline, improving convenience, economy, and reliability. It was also offered as a Standard model ("FEB"), although this did not receive the SELMIX system. Power was 21 PS (15.4 kW), as for the FB, and this engine also equipped the Suzulight Fronte FEA passenger car. A 22 PS (16.2 kW) version appeared in the FE/FEA from April 1965 with an improved Selmix system which acted at the crank. The oil was scattered along the cylinder wall from the crank by centrifugal force.

In February 1966 the improved Selmix system was replaced by the "CCI" lubrication system which added the oil directly at the cylinder as well as at the crankshaft (Cylinder Crank Injection); Vans and Frontes thus equipped are called FE2 and FEA2 respectively.

In 1967 the all new three-cylinder Fronte 360 replaced the FEA. A year later, in March 1968, the Van received a reed valve engine for the FE3 model. This was discontinued in January 1969, when the three-cylinder Fronte Van appeared. In May 1963, two of the recently introduced FE-powered Suzuki Frontes came in first and second in their class at the inaugural Japanese Grand Prix (Class C1, for engines with less than 400 cc), with an average speed of 89.763 km/h (55.776 mph). Two more Frontes came in fourth and eighth places. The winning driver was Osamu Mochizuki (望月 修) who crossed the finish line just ahead of teammate Haruhisa Fujita (藤田 晴久), both a full minute ahead of the third-placed Subaru 360.

Applications

- 1963.03–1969.01 Suzulight 360 Van FE/FEB/FE2/FE3
- 1963.03–1967.03 Suzulight Fronte FEA

== L50 ==
A water-cooled version of the FB, called the L50 since it was developed for the L50 Carry, appeared in March 1972 in the LJ20 Jimny. Engine dimensions remained unchanged, at 359 cc (21.9 cu in), while power increased to 28 PS (20.6 kW) at 5500 rpm, with torque up to 3.7 kg⋅m (36 N⋅m; 27 lb⋅ft) at 5000 rpm. The L50 was only ever fitted to commercial vehicles as Suzuki's passenger cars were by now using the three-cylinder LC10 engine. The L50 was also fitted to the short-lived LS20 Fronte Van for just over a year. It continued to be used in the Fronte Van's replacement, the 1973 "Fronte Hatch". The early version weighed 43 kg (95 lb).

In December 1974 an emissions scrubbed version of the L50 appeared in all applications; this version lost two horsepower for a new total of 26 PS (19.1 kW) at the same engine speed, with torque increased to 3.8 kg⋅m (37 N⋅m; 27 lb⋅ft) at a lower 4500 rpm. This was also ready for the unleaded gasoline introduced to the Japanese market on 1 February 1975. For 1976 another horsepower was lost. With new rules for Kei cars, allowing for engines of up to 550 cc, the L50 gained a cylinder and a new name in April 1976. The two-cylinder version was finally discontinued in July, when the Suzuki Fronte Hatch was also updated with the new three-cylinder engine.

Applications

- 1972.05–1976.04 Suzuki Carry L50
- 1972.03–1973.04 Suzuki Fronte Van LS20
- 1973.04–1976.07 Suzuki Fronte Hatch LS30
- 1972.03–1976.05 Suzuki Jimny LJ20

== L60 ==
The L60 was a rare, export-only version with a larger displacement. Like the L50, it is a water-cooled two-stroke twin, but has 446 cc (27.2 cu in) from a 68 mm × 61.5 mm (2.68 in × 2.42 in) bore and stroke. Appearing only in the L60 Carry, it was fitted to provide more power and torque to export markets not having regulations regarding engine size. Power is 29 PS (21.3 kW), rather than the 26 PS (19.1 kW) offered by the contemporary 360 in export trim.

Applications

- 1974–1976 Suzuki Carry L60 (export only)

== LJ50 ==
The LJ50 engine gained a cylinder to meet new kei car regulations regarding maximum displacement. With a 6.0:1 compression ratio, 33 hp (24.6 kW) at 5500 rpm and 5.7 kg⋅m (56 N⋅m; 41 lb⋅ft) at 3500 rpm, was first introduced in September 1975 for export market Suzuki Jimnys, which were usually marketed simply as the "Suzuki LJ50". In export market Carrys it has a somewhat lower compression ratio of 5.9:1 and this version develops 30 hp (22.4 kW) at 4500 rpm and 5.5 kg⋅m (54 N⋅m; 40 lb⋅ft) at 3000 rpm. It first appeared for the home market in June 1976 as the Jimny 55, subsequent to the changing of Kei car rules while also addressing stricter emission standards. The 539 cc (32.9 cu in) straight-three engine remained a two-stroke; while power for the emissions-scrubbed home market model remained 26 PS (19.1 kW) at 4500 rpm, more low-end torque was on offer - 5.3 kg⋅m (52 N⋅m; 38 lb⋅ft) at 3000 rpm. Both figures were obtained at considerably lower engine speeds.

Still water-cooled and with a bore and stroke of 61 mm × 61.5 mm (2.40 in × 2.42 in), this was largely an L50 engine with an extra cylinder added. The LJ50 was also fitted to several generations of the Carry microtruck and van, until July 1986.

Applications

- 1976.05–1976.09 Suzuki Carry 55 ST10/ST11
- 1976.09–1979.04 Suzuki Carry Wide 550 ST20
- 1979.04–1985.03 Suzuki Carry ST30/ST31
- 1985.03–1986.07 Suzuki Carry DA81T
- 1976.07–1979.04 Suzuki Hatch 550 SH10
- 1975.10–1981.05 Suzuki Jimny 55 SJ10, sold as "Suzuki LJ50" abroad
- 1981.05–1987.11 Suzuki Jimny 550 SJ30

== T5 series ==
In response to the changed Kei car regulations taking effect on January 1, 1976, Suzuki developed the T5A version for passenger car use. Passenger car engines were required to pass stricter emissions regulations than the LJ50, which was for commercial vehicles. The unrelated T4A engine was unable to meet these requirements and was also of only 443 cc (27.0 cu in), so it was replaced in October 1977. The name refers to it being the first ("A") engine with a 0.5-litre displacement. From its 539 cc (32.9 cu in) it provided 28 PS (20.6 kW) at 5000 rpm and 5.3 kg⋅m (52 N⋅m; 38 lb⋅ft) at 3000 rpm. At the same time, this engine (with the same power specifics) was also fitted to the sporting looking Suzuki Cervo microcoupé. This could finally meet the tighter 1978 (53年) emissions standards, which the T4A had not been able to do. The emissions system was called "TC53", for Twin Catalyst, year 53 of the Showa era (1978 in the common era).

In May 1979 the T5B appeared, simply a T5A engineered to be installed in a front-engine, front-wheel-drive layout. As for specifications, the only difference was that maximum power was now reached at 5500 rpm. This was installed in the all-new Alto/Fronte hatchback, alongside a new four-stroke engine called the F5A. In 1981 the T5B was discontinued, although the LJ50 sister version continued to be built until late 1987.

Applications

- T5A:
  - 1977.10–1979.04 Suzuki Fronte 7-S SS20
  - 1977.10–1982.06 Suzuki Cervo SS20
- T5B:
  - 1979.05–1981.09 Suzuki Alto SS30V
  - 1979.05–1981.05 Suzuki Fronte SS30S

== See also ==
- List of Suzuki engines
