= Launch Complex 10 =

Launch Complex 10 may refer to:

- Cape Canaveral Air Force Station Launch Complex 10, a launch pad used by SM-64 Navaho missiles and Jason and Draco sounding rockets
- Vandenberg AFB Space Launch Complex 10, a space launching facility
