= Lloyd 400 =

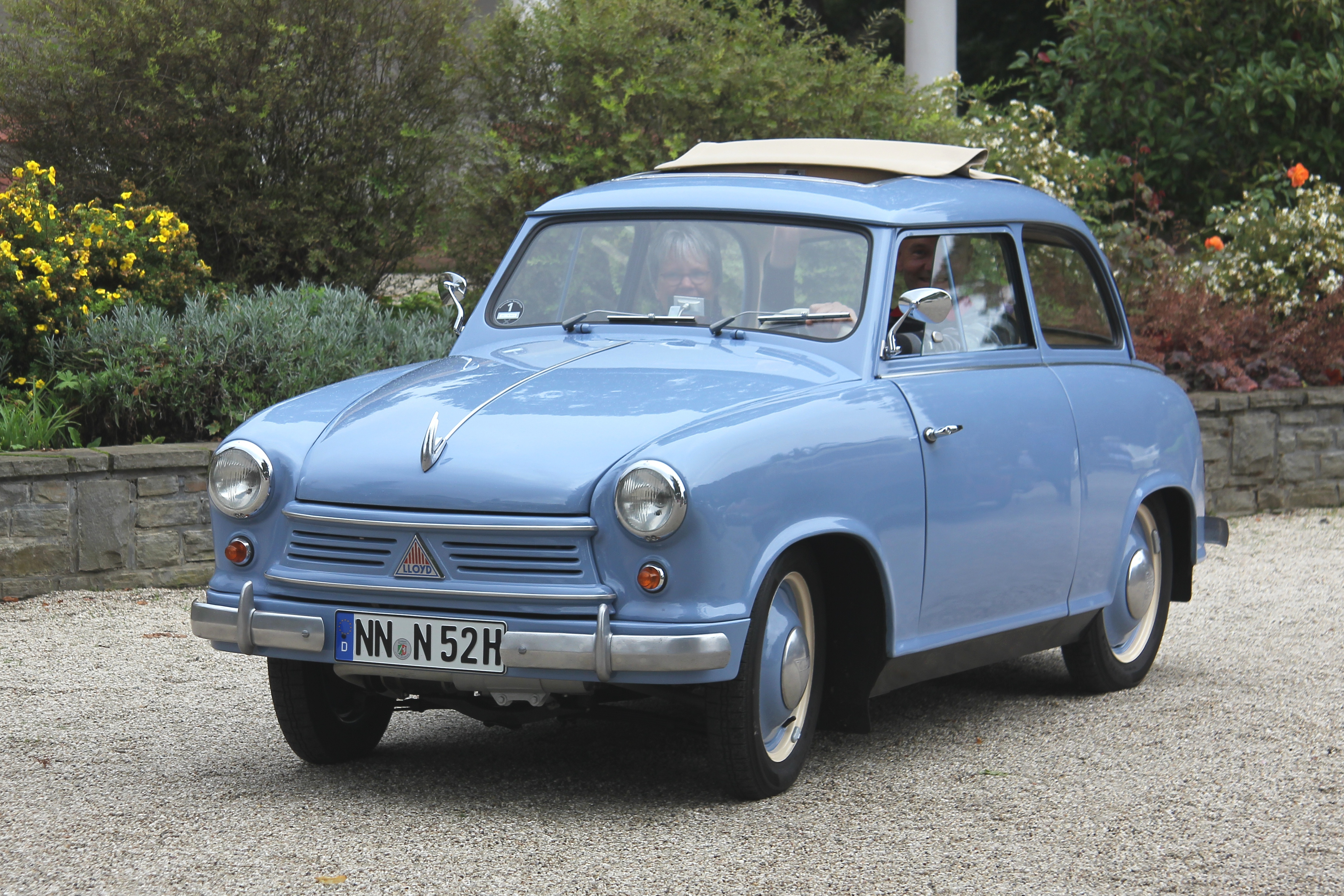
- Lloyd LP400

Overview
- Manufacturer: Carl F. W. Borgward GmbH
- Production: 1953–1957; 106,110 built
- Assembly: West Germany: Bremen

Body and chassis
- Body style: 2-door saloon 2-door Cabrio-Limousine; Kombi; Panel van
- Layout: FF layout
- Doors: Suicide doors
- Related: Suzuki Suzulight

Powertrain
- Engine: 386 cc two-stroke 2-cylinder (parallel twin)
- Transmission: 3-speed manual: no synchromesh

Dimensions
- Wheelbase: 2,000 mm (78.7 in)
- Length: 3,355 mm (132.1 in)
- Width: 1,410 mm (55.5 in)
- Height: 1,400 mm (55.1 in)
- Curb weight: 510 kg (1,124 lb) (empty); 820 kg (1,810 lb) (loaded)

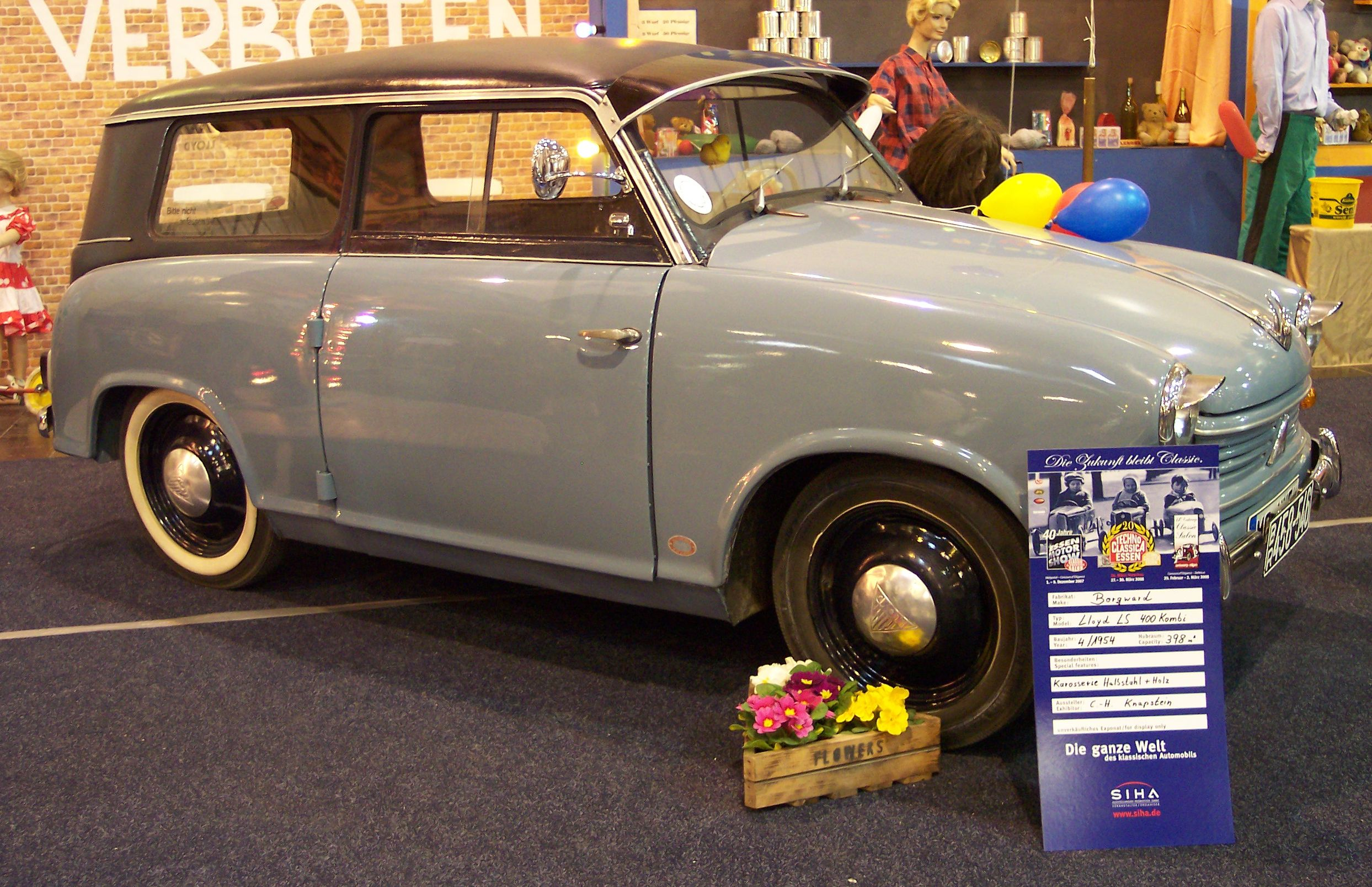
Lloyd LS400 (Kombi)

The Lloyd 400 is a small car produced by the Borgward Group's Lloyd Motoren Werke GmbH (Lloyd Motor Works) in Bremen between 1953 and 1957.

As with its predecessor, the Lloyd 300, the full name of the Lloyd 400 featured a two letter prefix that identified the body shape as follows: LP400 ("Limousine" / saloon), LK400 (panel van) and LS400 (estate). From August 1955 an LC400 ("Cabrio-Limousine" / cabriolet saloon) was also offered.

== Engine and running gear ==
The Lloyd 400 was powered by an air-cooled twin cylinder two-stroke engine with a horizontal-flow Solex 30 BFRH carburetor. The engine was mounted transversely. The engine was based on that of the Lloyd 300, but the cylinder bore (diameter) was increased by 8 millimetres (0.31 in) to 62 millimetres (2.4 in). The resulting engine capacity of 386cc provided for a maximum power output of 13 PS (9.6 kW) at 3,750 rpm. The top speed listed was 75 km/h (47 mph). Despite the leisurely performance figures, the Lloyd 400 was considerably faster and more powerful than its predecessor. The car was fueled using "regular" grade petrol/gasoline, mixed in the ratio of 25:1 with oil, reflecting the requirements of the "motorbike-style" two-stroke engine. When driven normally the Lloyd 400 consumed fuel significantly more frugally than West Germany's best selling small car, the Volkswagen. Space was at a premium and the 25 litres (5.5 imp gal; 6.6 US gal) fuel tank was accommodated ahead of the bulkhead underneath the front hood/bonnet in a space shared with the engine and the six-volt battery. Power was fed to the front wheels via a three-speed manual gear box: there was no synchromesh.

The steering employed a rack and pinion mechanism which was conventional at the time. It required 2¼ turns between opposite locks: the turning circle was 11 m (36 ft). The front wheels were suspended by two laterally mounted leaf springs. At the back there was a swing axle with semi-elliptical longitudinally configured leaf springs. There were essentially three development phases for the Lloyd 400, and the first batch of cars was delivered with drum brakes of 180 millimetres (7.1 in) diameter, controlled via a cable linkage. From March 1953, however, a hydraulic linkage mechanism was installed, and on cars produced after August 1955 the diameter of the brake drums was increased to 200 millimetres (7.9 in). The mechanically controlled hand brake worked on the front wheels.

A budget version of the Lloyd 400, the Lloyd 250, was launched in April 1956. Its stripped down specification meant the removal of hub caps and bumpers, and there was no backrest for passengers in the back. The reduced size and power of the engine in the Lloyd 250 nevertheless enabled it to be driven legally with a "Class IV" driving license, meaning that in West Germany it could be driven by people who had not yet passed a standard driving test.

== Body ==
Structural changes through the model life define the three phases of the Lloyd 400's production. The car was launched with a timber frame body, clad in a synthetic-leather outer skin, reflecting the structural underpinnings of the Lloyd 300 of which the Lloyd 400 was in many respects an upgraded version. However, only about 1,000 cars had been produced before the skins on the wing panels were replaced with steel panels in March 1953. From January 1954 the bonnet/hood and boot/trunk lids were also formed of sheet steel, and cars produced after November came with a steel roof. The steel roofed Lloyd 400s are easy to differentiate from earlier cars with synthetic leather skin covering the roof, since the switch to a steel roof was accompanied by an increase in the size of the (now curved) rear window.

Lloyd themselves still had no heavy presses for stamping body panels from sheet steel. Body panels were bought in, delivered in bare-metal form to the Lloyd factory in Bremen for finishing, assembly and painting. Most of the cars produced were LP400 Limousine (saloon/sedan) bodied cars. A LS400 Kombi (estate/station wagon) was also available along with an LK400 panel van. In September 1955 an LC400 Cabrio-Limousine (convertible) joined the range. The doors were hinged at the rear edge in every case.

== Commercial ==
In 1953 the Lloyd LP400 (saloon/sedan) came with a manufacturer's recommended price of DM 3,780, while the Kombi was priced at DM 3,970. By September 1955, supported by that year's healthy sales volumes, and presumably in response to pressure from the market, the price of the LP400 was down to DM3,350, and the Kombi was offered at DM3,480. However, the small car market in West Germany was increasingly dominated by Volkswagen. In March 1954, the price of a standard Volkswagen was reduced from DM4,150 to DM3,950. Apart from a handful of exotic looking (and exotically priced) vehicles, the passenger cars produced by Volkswagen were all the same shape. The shape had been innovative twenty years earlier, but the architecture and look of the car had changed very little since. The approach of the Borgward Group could hardly have been more different. In 1955 the group produced 91,810 passenger cars, using three different brands and offering a wider range of models than any other West German manufacturer, with models replaced or substantially upgraded every few years. One result of these contrasting approaches was that it was Volkswagen that set the prices in what was still an acutely price sensitive market segment. In August 1955 the price of a standard Volkswagen came down again, to DM3,790, a level that it held till 1961. In order to maintain market share, competitors had little option other than leaving Volkswagen to set the benchmark prices on the domestic market.

The Lloyd 400 was nevertheless considered a commercial success. In 1955, production peaked, at 47,903 cars, which represented more than 50% of the cars produced by the entire Borgward Group in what turned out to be its best ever year, in terms of production volumes. Total production for the Lloyd 400 between 1953 and 1957 came out at 106,110 units. This enabled the Borgward Group to feature as West Germany's third largest automobile producer, behind only Volkswagen and Opel (and ahead of Ford and Mercedes-Benz). It is, however, salutary to note that even in 1955, Volkswagen produced 279,986 Volkswagen Beetles, representing more than five Beetles for every Lloyd 400 produced.

== See also ==
- Suzuki Suzulight
