= Suzuki LC10 engine =

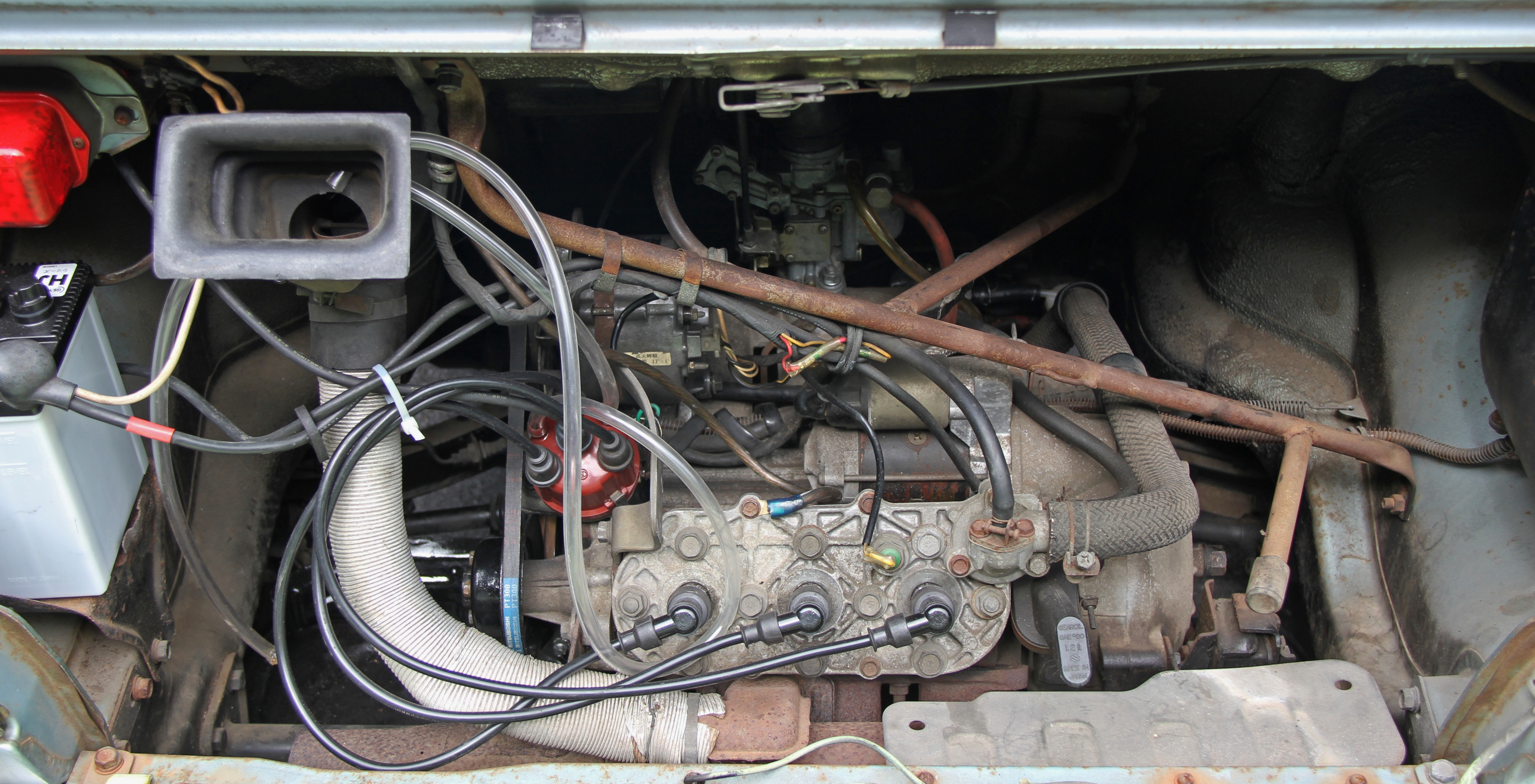

Overview
- Manufacturer: Suzuki

Layout
- Configuration: Straight-3
- Displacement: 356 cc (21.7 cu in); 443 cc (27.0 cu in); 475 cc (29.0 cu in)
- Cylinder bore: 52 mm (2.0 in); 58 mm (2.28 in); 60 mm (2.36 in)
- Piston stroke: 56 mm (2.2 in)
- Compression ratio: 6.8:1

Combustion
- Fuel system: Mikuni VM carburettor
- Fuel type: Gasoline
- Oil system: CCI SELMIX
- Cooling system: Water-cooled; Air-cooled

Output
- Power output: 25–60 PS (25–59 hp; 18–44 kW)
- Torque output: 31–45 N⋅m (3–5 kg⋅m; 23–33 lb⋅ft)

LC10 was the original name given to a series of very small three-cylinder, two-stroke engines built by Suzuki Motor Corporation in the 1960s and 1970s. They were used in a number of kei class automobiles and light trucks. The LC10 and its derivatives did not completely replace the FE and L50 two-cylinders, which continued to be used mainly for light commercials. The LC10 engine was developed together with the Suzuki B100 engine, a 8–11 PS (5.9–8.1 kW) 118.9 cc (7.26 cu in) single-cylinder motorcycle engine which shared the same bore and stroke. For longevity and convenience, the LC10 received Suzuki's new "Posi-Force" auto-lubrication system, eliminating the need for pre-mixed fuel.

== LC10 ==
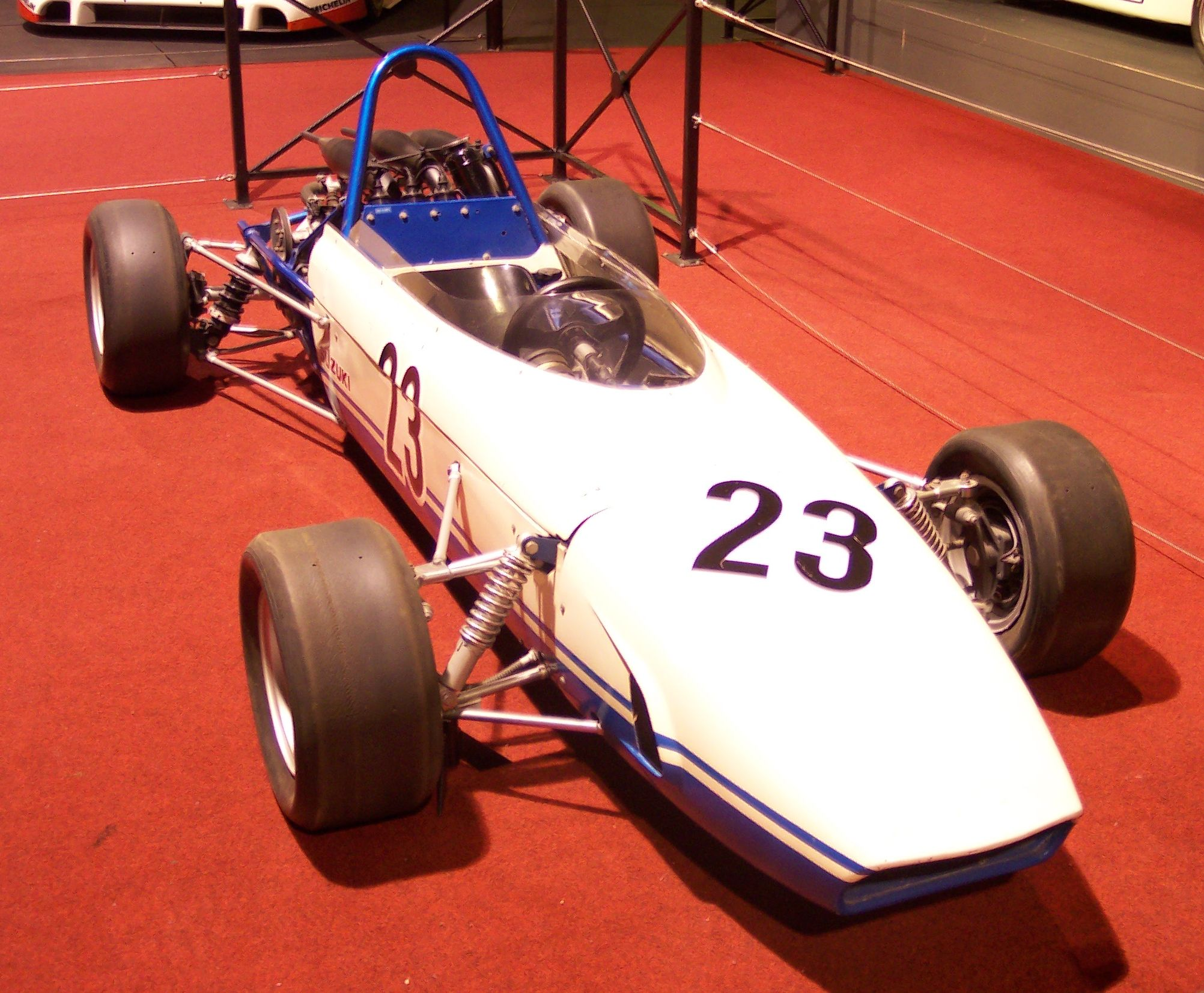
1969 Nialco RQ with Suzuki LC10 engine

The engine was first seen in air-cooled form, equipped with three Mikuni VM carburettors, in the 1967 LC10 Suzuki Fronte 360. Displacement was 356 cc (21.7 cu in), from a bore and stroke of 52 mm × 56 mm (2.0 in × 2.2 in). Originally developing 25 PS (18.4 kW), a 36 PS (26.5 kW) SS version soon appeared, with a stunning 101.1 PS/L (1.634 hp/cu in). For the conventionally laid out Fronte Van, Estate, and Custom a single carburettor version was used. Combined with a lower compression ratio of 6.8:1, this meant a max power of 25 PS (18.4 kW). For 1971, the LC10 engine received Suzuki's new self-lubricating "CCIS" system (Cylinder Crank Injection and Selmix).

In 1969, Japanese racing car manufacturer Nialco built a single-seater called the RQ which utilized the triple-carb LC10 engine and competed in the RQ ("Racing Quarterly") Minicar Racing Tournament. Their best result was a fourth in the 1969 meet at Fuji, with Kikuo Kaira (future co-founder of Tommy Kaira) at the wheel.

Applications:

- 1967.04–1970.11 Suzuki Fronte 360
- 1970.11–1973.07 Suzuki Fronte LC10 II ("Sting Ray" Fronte)
- 1969.01–1972.03 Suzuki Fronte Van/Estate/Custom LS10/11, 25 PS (18.4 kW)
- 1970.08–1971 Suzuki Fronte Hi-Custom LS11, 30 PS (22.1 kW)

== LC10W ==
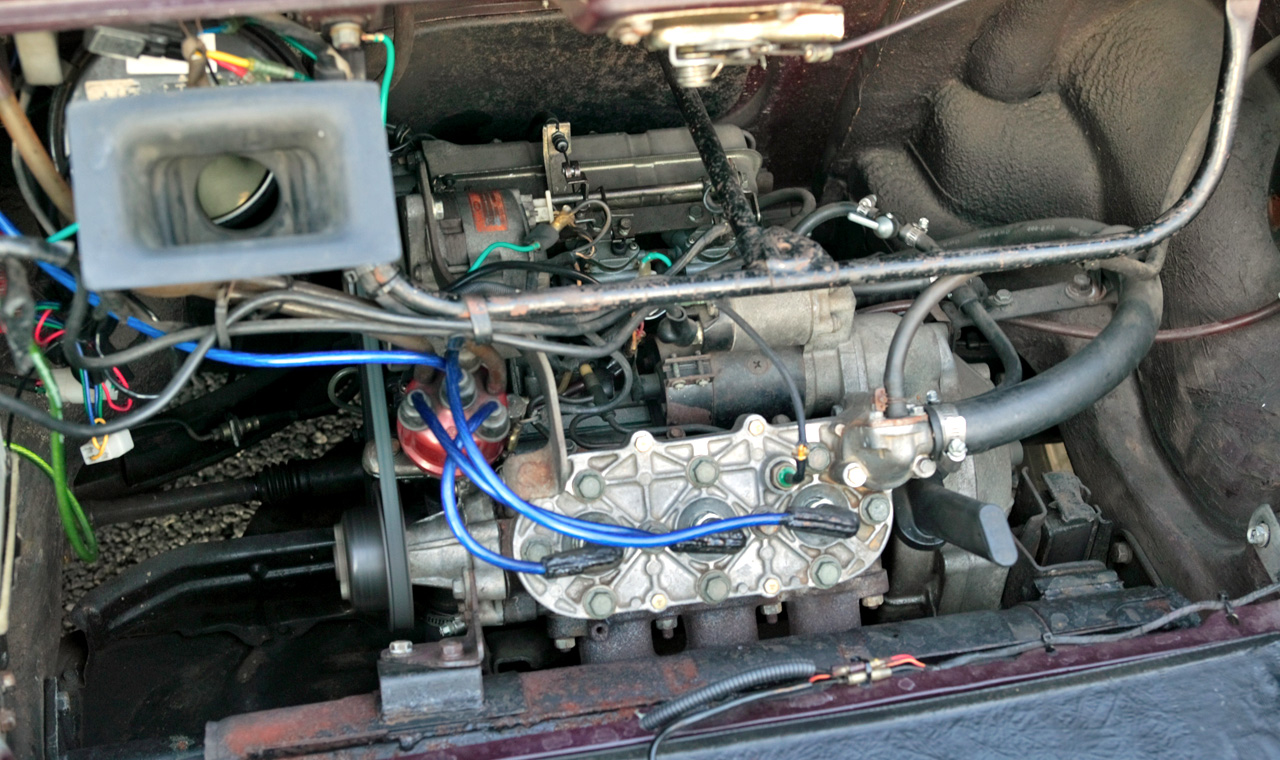
LC10W engine in Fronte Coupé

In May 1971, as kei cars were becoming more and more sophisticated, a water-cooled version was presented. The air-cooled versions were soon relegated to use only in the cheapest versions, and disappeared entirely after 1973 as emissions standards became more stringent. The watercooled versions also had slightly better weight distribution (38/62 versus 37.5/62.5), due to the radiator being mounted up front. This, the LC10W, was the only engine ever to be installed in the iconic Suzuki Fronte Coupé, whether in domestic or export market cars. The new 1973-1976 "oval shell" Fronte received the new LC20 chassis code but retained the LC10W engine code. In May/June 1974, power outputs dropped as the engine received additional emissions cleaning equipment. A version using Suzuki's Twin Catalyst ("TC") system was announced on the Fronte LC20 in May 1976 but only 61 examples were built.

From 1973 the LC10W engines also received Suzuki's SRIS (Suzuki Recycle Injection System), a method for lowering visible exhaust smoke by collecting and burning residual oil/gas lying in the bottom of the crank chambers. This was first seen on the Suzuki GT750, GT550, and GT380 motorcycles. In an effort to reduce CO, HC, and NO_{x} emissions, the EPIC (Exhaust Port Ignition Cleaner) system was also installed.

Applications:

- 1971.05–1973.07 Suzuki Fronte LC10 W
- 1971.09–1976 Suzuki Fronte Coupé
- 1973–1976.05 Suzuki Fronte LC20

Specifications

Dimensions	Carburettor	Power		at rpm	Torque			at rpm	dates	fitment
Dimensions	Carburettor	PS	kW	at rpm	kgm	Nm	lbft	at rpm	dates	fitment
356 cc I3 bore: 52 mm (2.05 in) stroke: 56 mm (2.20 in)	1 x Solex	31	22.8	6,000	4.0	39	29	4,500	07.1971-05.1974	Fronte LC10W, Coupé
356 cc I3 bore: 52 mm (2.05 in) stroke: 56 mm (2.20 in)	1 x Solex	32	23.5	5,500	4.2	41	30	4,500	05.1974-06.1976	Fronte LC20
356 cc I3 bore: 52 mm (2.05 in) stroke: 56 mm (2.20 in)	1 x Solex	34	25.0		4.2	41	30		07.1973-06.1974	Fronte LC20
356 cc I3 bore: 52 mm (2.05 in) stroke: 56 mm (2.20 in)	3 x Mikuni VM18	34	25.0	6,000	4.2	41	30	4,500	05.1971-05.1974	Fronte LC10W, Coupé
356 cc I3 bore: 52 mm (2.05 in) stroke: 56 mm (2.20 in)	3 x Mikuni VM22	35	25.7	6,000	4.2	41	30	4,500	05.1974-06.1976	Fronte LC20, Coupé
356 cc I3 bore: 52 mm (2.05 in) stroke: 56 mm (2.20 in)	3 x Mikuni VM22	37	27.2	6,500	4.2	41	30	4,500	05.1971-06.1974	Fronte LC10W, LC20, Coupé

== LC50 ==
A bored-out version 60 mm × 56 mm (2.4 in × 2.2 in) of the air-cooled LC10, called the LC50 in reference to its near half-litre displacement (actually 475 cc [29.0 cu in]) appeared in January 1969. In street applications, this engine was only for export, and was only ever made with air cooling. Like its smaller brethren, the LC50 breathed through triple carburettors.

Water-cooled 475 cc (29.0 cu in) triples were built for racing purposes, producing 60 PS (44 kW) at 9,000 rpm. These took part in the JAF Grand Prix Formula Junior class as well as "MR" (Minicar Racing) meets. Thus equipped, the Can-Am style Fronte RF with Mitsuo Itoh at the helm took the victory at the 1970 "Junior Seven Challenge Cup" race, held at Fuji International Speedway, with an average speed of 130.9 km/h (81.3 mph).

- 1969.01–1970 Suzuki Fronte 500
- 1970–1973.07 Suzuki Fronte 500/LC50 ("Sting Ray")

== T4A ==
In response to the changed Kei car regulations taking effect on January 1, 1976, Suzuki developed a bored out and cleaner version of the LC10W, featuring Suzuki TC (Twin Catalyst, a double muffler in which uncombusted fuel was burned) emissions equipment. The watercooled 443 cc (27.0 cu in) engine was bored out to 58 mm (2.3 in). Like the other engines in this family, is used an iron block and an aluminium head. Sometime between 1973 and 1976 Suzuki had changed their system of naming engines, so this engine became the T4A. This meant that it was the first ("A") engine with a 0.4-litre displacement. To help reduce emissions the T4A employed a semi-automatic choke; if left on when driving, it would disengage automatically once the engine coolant reached 45 °C (113 °F).

The T4A was fairly short-lived (only used in the Fronte 7-S for just shy of a year and a half), and was soon replaced by an unrelated "full size" (550 cc) engine called the T5A/T5B. The emissions strangled T4A put out 25 PS (18.4 kW) at 4,500 rpm in its final "TC53" form: specific power was 54% of what a 1972 Fronte GT had managed. This updated version had one small catalyst in a shortened exhaust manifold with a new liner and a much larger catalytic converter in the muffler (twice the size of the one used on the initial model), along with changes to the carburetor, secondary air supply, and ignition coil. The new catalytic converters used palladium and were developed in close cooperation with Mitsui Mining & Smelting.

- 1976.05–1977.10 Suzuki Fronte 7-S SS10/SS12

Specifications

Dimensions	Carburettor	Power		at rpm	Torque			at rpm	dates	fitment
Dimensions	Carburettor	PS	kW	at rpm	kgm	Nm	lbft	at rpm	dates	fitment
443 cc I3 bore: 58 mm (2.28 in) stroke: 56 mm (2.20 in)	Single, downdraught Solex	26	19.1	4,500	4.7	46	34	3,500	05.1976-05.1977	Fronte SS10, SS10-2
443 cc I3 bore: 58 mm (2.28 in) stroke: 56 mm (2.20 in)	Single, downdraught Solex	25	18.4	4,500	4.6	45	33	3,500	05.1977-10.1977	Fronte SS12

== See also ==
- List of Suzuki engines
