= Cony Guppy =

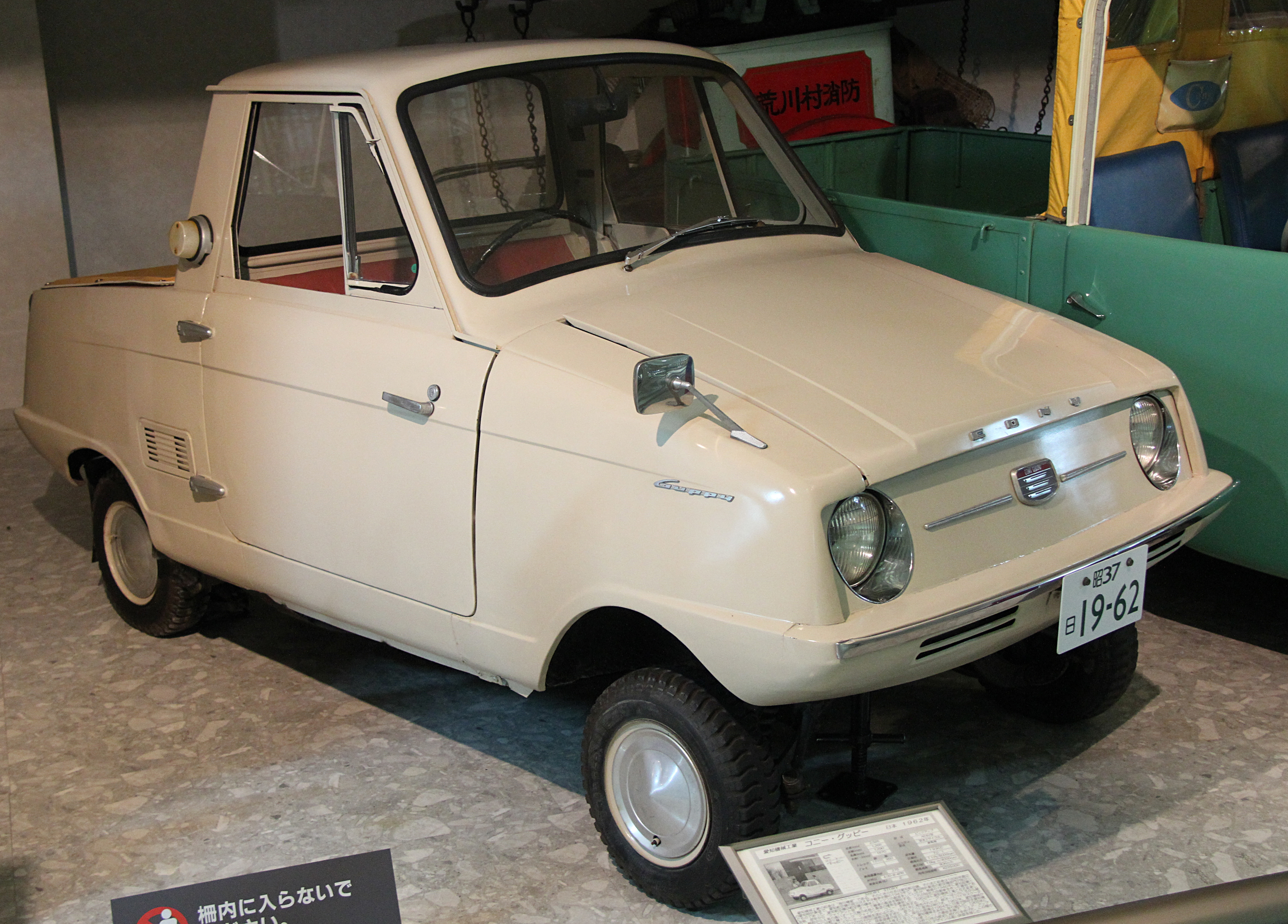

Overview
- Manufacturer: Aichi Machine Industry Co., Ltd
- Also called: Datsun Baby
- Production: >5000 units
- Model years: 1961
- Assembly: Japan

Body and chassis
- Class: Kei car
- Body style: 2-door pickup truck
- Layout: RMR

Powertrain
- Engine: 199 cc 1 cylinder

Dimensions
- Curb weight: 290 kg (639 lb)

Chronology
- Successor: Cony 360

The Cony Guppy is a small pickup truck manufactured by Aichi. The vehicle had suicide doors and rotating amber beacons on the B-pillar. The brake lights were tiny and circular. The engine, which rests behind the seats, is a two-valve, 199 cc single-cylinder unit that produces 11 horsepower (8.2 kW). It can power the vehicle to a top speed of 50 miles per hour (80 km/h). Aichi rated the Guppy's fuel economy at 50 km/L. They also claimed the Guppy could carry 100 kilograms (220 lb) of cargo. Its low price of ¥225,000 made it attractive to small business owners and cargo transporters. Other features include a four-wheel independent suspension and a torque converter for clutchless driving.

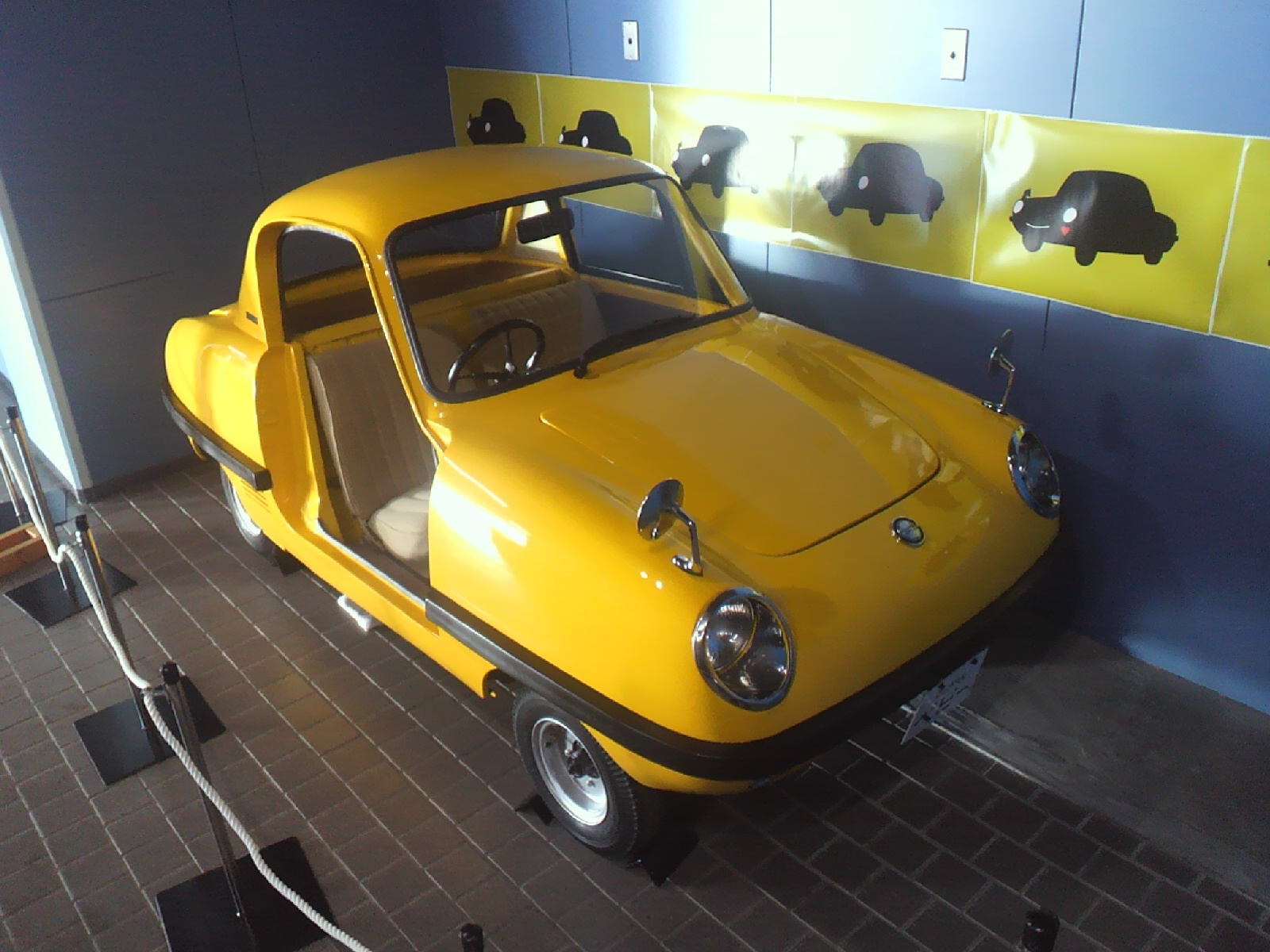
Datsun Baby

Nissan donated 100 cars based on the Guppy to the Kodomo no Kuni Children's Park in Hazu, Aichi, in 1965. This was long after the Guppy had been taken out of production; Nissan built them from leftover parts acquired as a result of their gradual takeover of the Aichi company. Called the "Datsun Baby" they had a speed limiter, limiting top speed to 30 km/h (18.6 mph). Otherwise they were mechanically identical to the Guppy, but with different bodywork.
