= Cony 360 =

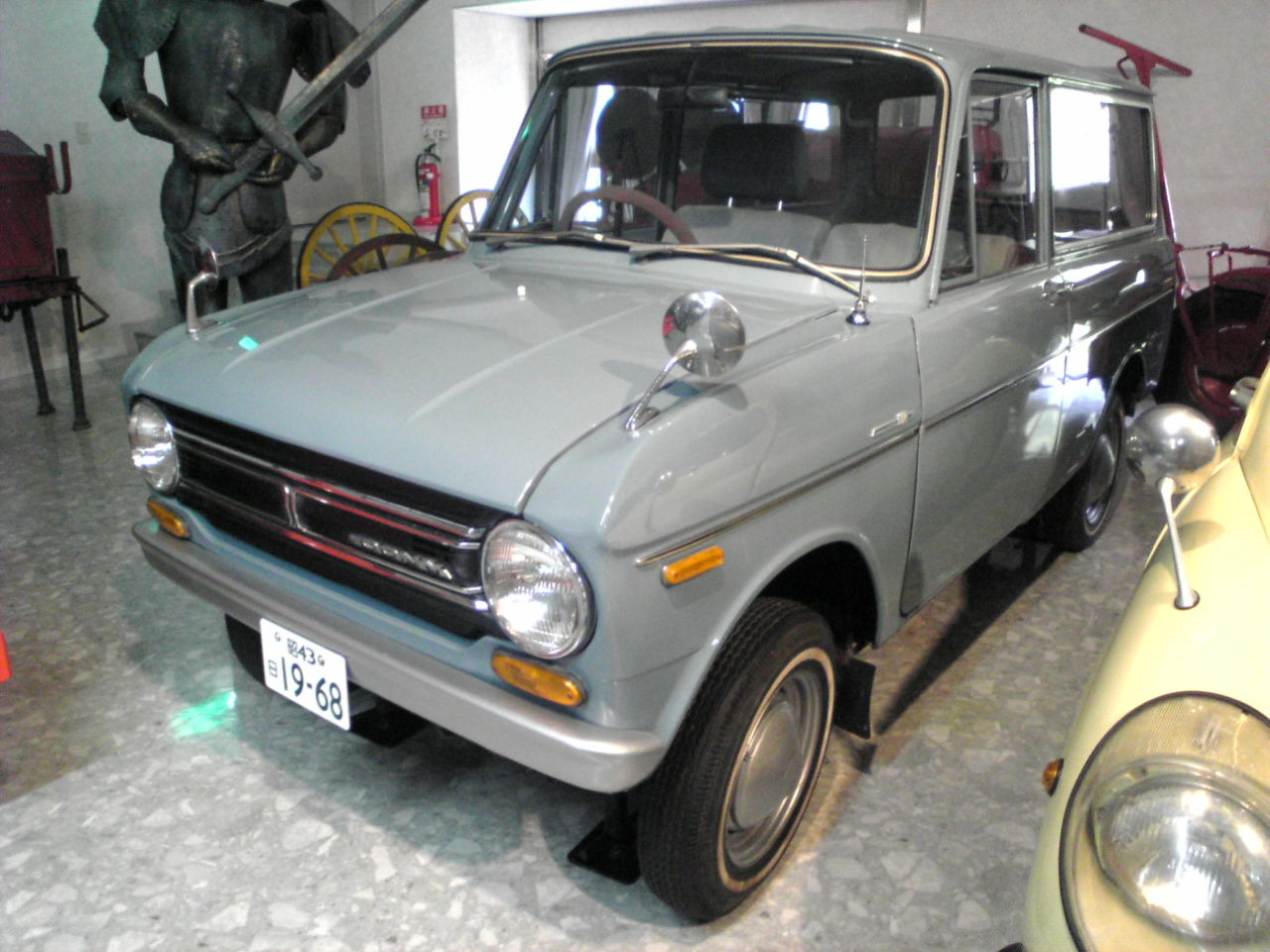

Overview
- Manufacturer: Aichi Machine Industry Co., Ltd
- Production: 143,845 units (sedan, panel truck, pickup); 100,886 units (Wide cabover truck/van)
- Model years: 1962-1971
- Assembly: Japan

Body and chassis
- Body style: kei truck 3-door wagon 2-door coupé van
- Layout: RMR

Powertrain
- Engine: 354 cc 2-cylinder boxer
- Transmission: 3-speed manual (until 1967), 4-speed manual (post-1967)

Dimensions
- Wheelbase: 1,970 mm (77.6 in)
- Length: 2,995 mm (117.9 in)
- Width: 1,300 mm (51.2 in)
- Height: 1,470 mm (57.9 in)
- Curb weight: 575 kg (1,268 lb)

Chronology
- Predecessor: Cony Guppy

The Cony 360 was a kei car, truck, and van made by Aichi Kokuki.

== Overview ==
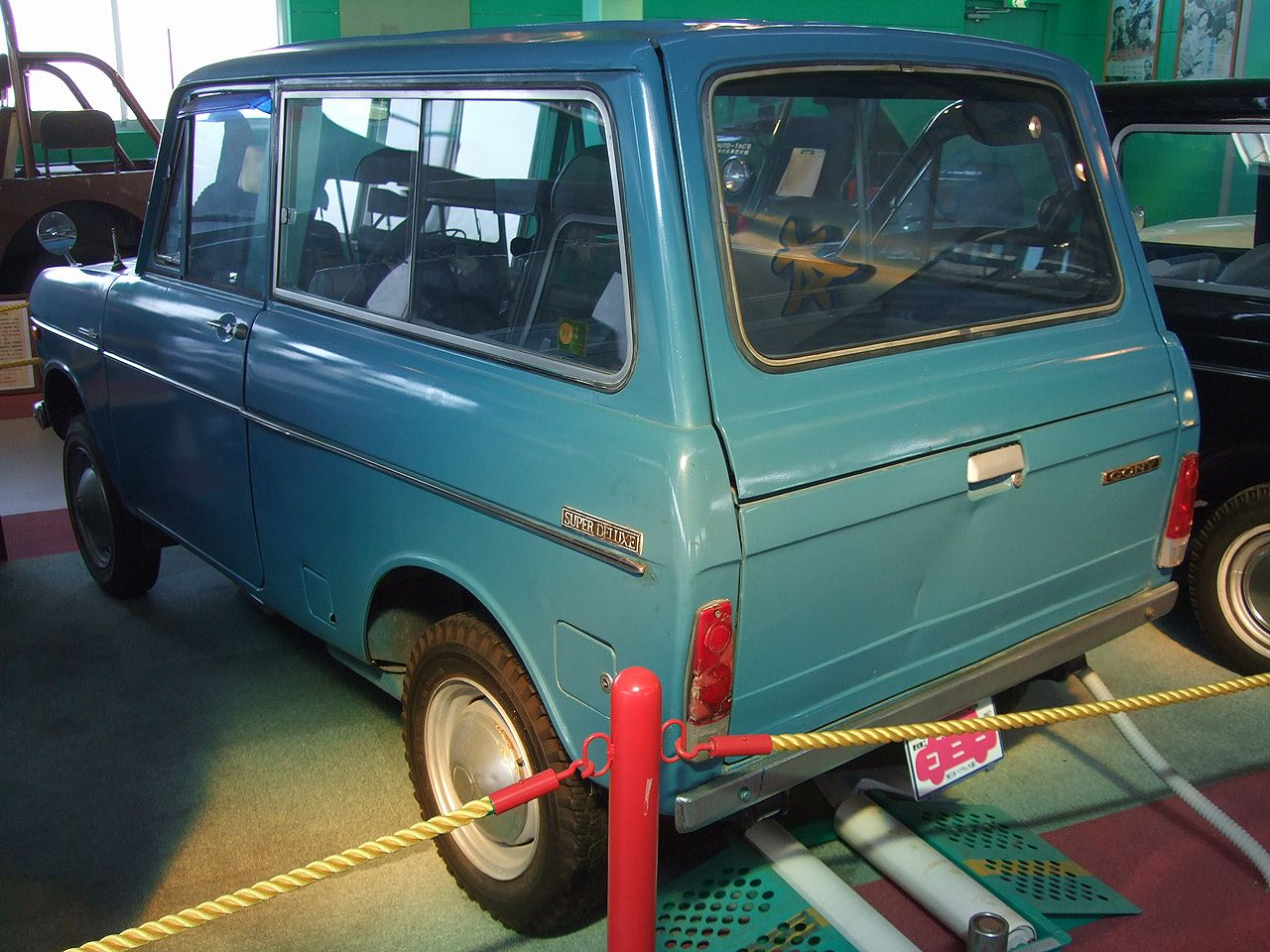
Cony 360 rear

The 360 (referring to the 354 cc engine, bore × stroke: 64 × 55 mm) had a two-cylinder boxer engine producing 18.6 PS (14 kW) at 5500 rpm. Originally introduced as a two-door sedan, it was also built in light panel van and pickup truck versions, replacing the unrefined and outdated Cony Guppy and the similar Giant 360. Instead of an air-cooled two cylinder engine from the previous model, which was seen as outdated and unrefined, a new lighter air-cooled four cylinder engine producing 18 hp was placed in the 360; power went up to 20 hp after 1967. The vehicle was a technical oddity in early-1960s Japan. The compact engine, designed to take as little space as possible, was mounted in a RMR layout with a dry sump instead of an oil pan. The vehicle featured rack and pinion steering, a feature that was rare in Japanese cars at the time and mostly found on advanced American and European performance cars; post-1967 models also had a four-speed manual transmission, a rarity in kei cars of the time. Despite technological advantages, the 360's performance was low even for its class. It had a top speed of 74 km/h.

== Cabover truck ==
The wide truck was unveiled at the 1964 Tokyo Motor Show as a competitor to established cab over kei truck models such as the Subaru Sambar and Daihatsu Hijet. The name of Wide was due to the large size of the loading platform, which was the largest in its class; a panel van version was introduced in 1966. Some of the cab-over trucks were made in left-hand drive for export markets, mainly North America.

== Demise ==
For a smaller Japanese manufacturer, Aichi Kokuki was fairly successful and innovative; however, competition in the Japanese auto industry became fierce, particularly in the 360 cc kei segment. The introduction of newcomers, mainly the Honda N360 and T360 in particular, ate into Cony's market share as the vehicles, while advanced, were inferior in capability and performance compared to the Honda and Suzulight models. Nissan, having taken over Prince Motor Company in 1965, was greatly expanding its production and influence in the Japanese auto industry. Aichi Kokuki began its collaboration with Nissan in 1965, designing the Nissan A engine which would debut in the brand new 1966 Nissan Sunny. Aichi Kokuki's financial problems, combined with Nissan increasing their share of the company, caused the production of Cony vehicles to finally come to a halt in 1970; while there were plans to continue Cony vehicles under the Nissan badge, the plant was instead put to use to produce larger and far more profitable Nissan models, such as the Nissan Cherry, while the dealer network was transformed into the Nissan Cherry Store. Nissan did not control Aichi Kouchi completely until 2012, when it became a full-fledged subsidiary of Nissan.
