= Kei car =

Very small Japanese cars

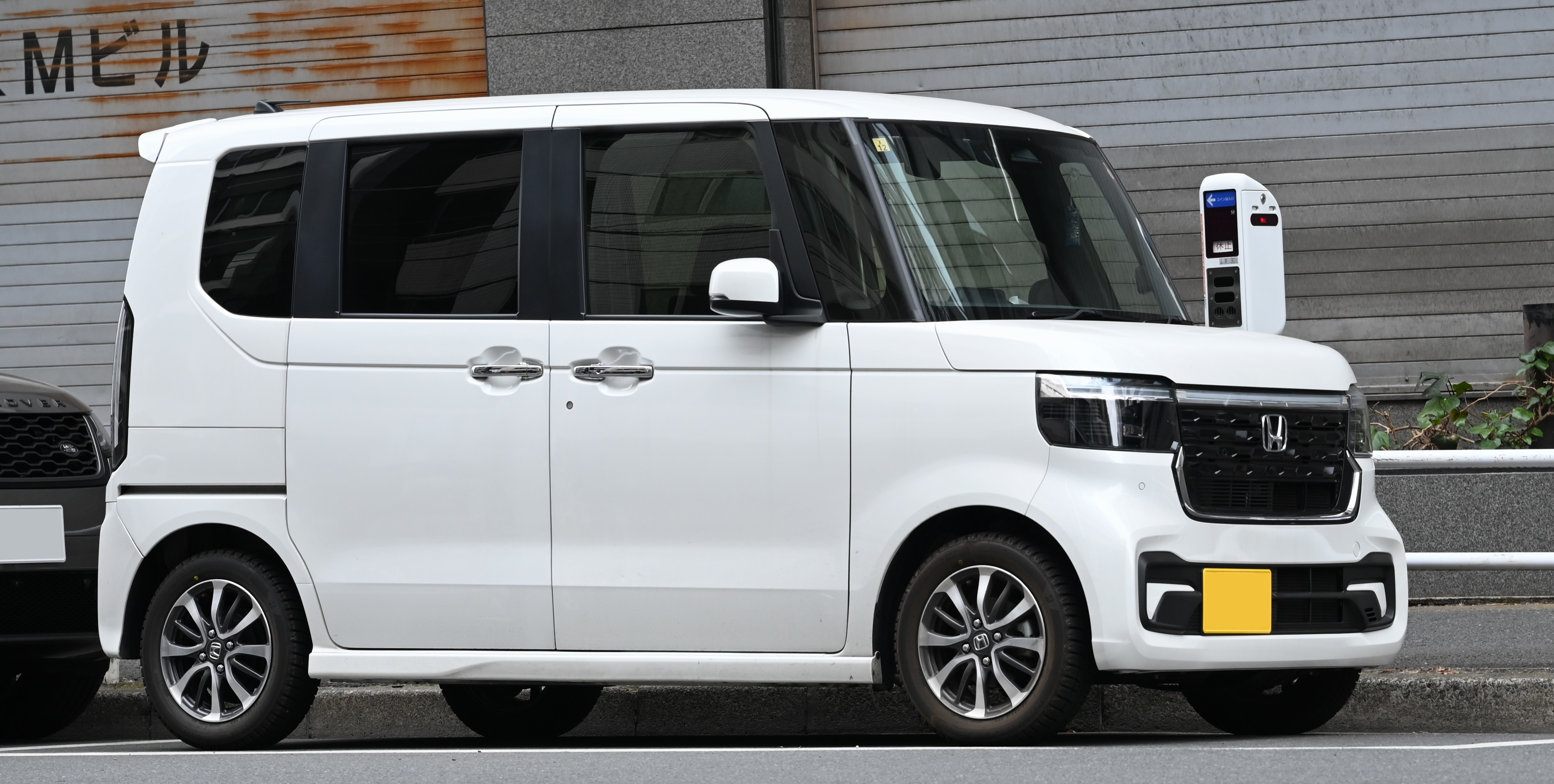
Honda N-Box

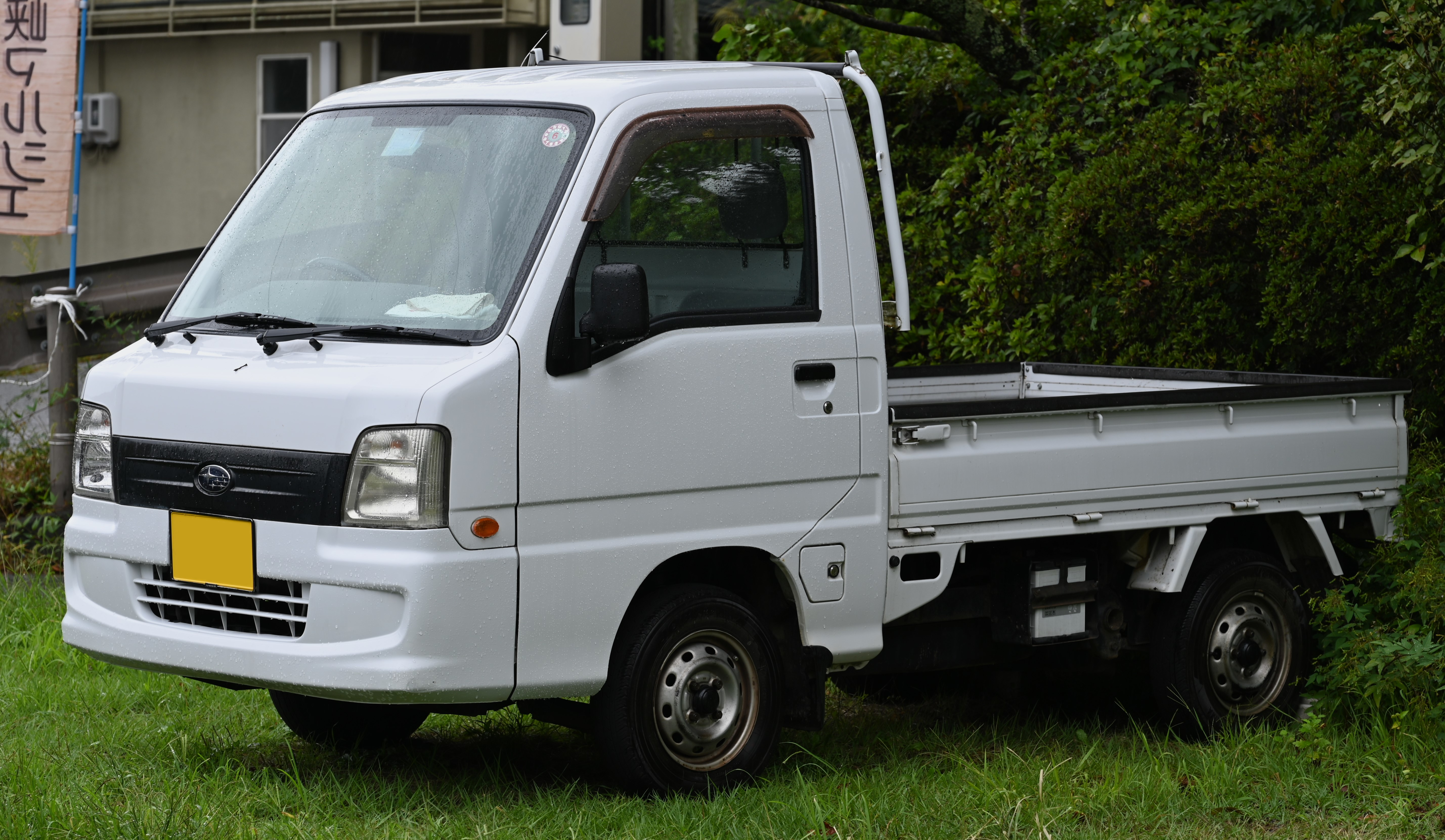
Subaru Sambar

Kei car, short for kei-jidōsha (軽自動車 pronounced [keːdʑidoːɕa] "light automobile"), is a class of ultra-compact cars unique to the Japanese domestic market, and is the smallest category of expressway-legal motor vehicles in Japan. Other than passenger cars, Japanese automakers also make microvans and kei trucks within this legal category.

The kei category was created by the Japanese government in 1949, to stimulate both car ownership and growth of Japan's car industry. The regulations were revised multiple times until 1998, but since October 1998, the law consistently specifies a maximum vehicle length of 3.4 m (11.2 ft), width of 1.48 m (4 ft 10.3 in), height under 2.0 m (6 ft 6.7 in), and engine displacement under 660 cc (40.3 cu in). A "gentleman's agreement" between Japanese automakers and lawmakers also set a maximum power output of 64 PS (63 hp; 47 kW). With restricted dimensions and engine specifications, kei car owners enjoy lower tax and vehicle insurance rates, leading to a lower overall ownership cost. In most rural areas, they are also exempt from the mandatory shako shōmeisho (車庫証明書), which are certificates of parking space ownership that Japanese car buyers are required to provide before they are allowed to legally buy a motor vehicle, as public street parking is generally restricted in Japan.

Kei cars are favored by both the elderly and younger demographics, including young families, due to their affordability and ease of use. As a result, kei cars have been very successful in Japan since the 1960s, consisting of over one-third of domestic new car sales in fiscal year 2016, after dropping from a record 40 percent market share in 2013. To reduce their market dominance, Japan increased taxes on the category by 50% in 2014. Despite this, in 2018, seven of the ten top-selling models were kei cars, including high-roof models with sliding doors such as the Honda N-Box, Suzuki Spacia, Nissan Dayz, and Daihatsu Tanto.

Nearly all kei cars have been designed and manufactured domestically, but some exceptions exist. A version of the European-built Smart Fortwo was briefly imported and officially classified as a kei car with modifications to reduce its width. In addition, the British Caterham 7 160 and the Polski Fiat 126p (after 1990) also received such classification. In mid-2026, Chinese EV manufacturer BYD also introduced the battery-electric Racco specifically designed for the Japanese market. For exports, kei cars are generally too small and specialized to be profitable in markets outside Japan, but notable exceptions exist; for instance, the Suzuki Alto and Daihatsu Cuore have been exported consistently since around 1980. The export version of the Suzuki Jimny, with upgrades to increase its width and engine power, has also gained significant popularity outside Japan.

== Description ==
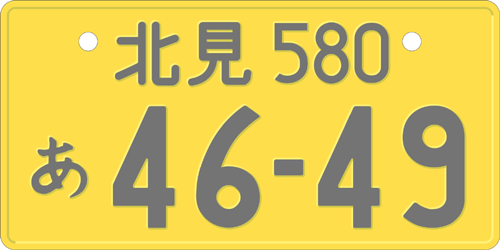
Private kei license plate

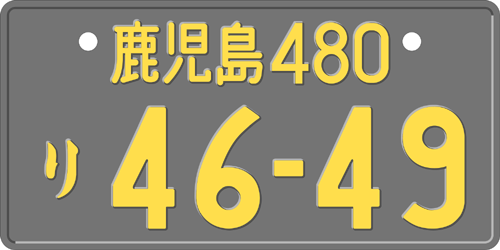
Commercial kei license plate

Japanese government regulations limit the outer physical size, and (combustion) engine displacement and power output of kei cars, see detailed table below. Kei cars have also been subject to other restrictions, chiefly lower speed limits than bigger vehicles; older Kei-cars also had a warning chime that sounded when being driven too fast.

Kei cars are issued special license plates, with black numbers on a yellow background for private use, and yellow numbers on a black background for commercial use, earning them the name "yellow-plate cars" in English-speaking circles.

Modern Kei cars are often available with turbocharged engines, automatic and continuously variable transmissions, and choice of front-wheel or all-wheel drive. After the 1980s, Kei cars had matured so much in power, speed, and passive (crash) safety, that they were no longer bound to lower maximum speeds than other cars. Japan's carmakers since agreed on a self-imposed maximum 140 km/h (87 mph) speed, mostly because of their narrow width.

=== A-segment comparison ===
Kei cars are often considered the Japanese equivalent of the European Union's A-segment "city cars". However, contrary to Japan's special Kei cars' legal status and limitations, there are no EU- or pan-European legal restrictions, exceptions or benefits for what European auto journalism or market analysts call the 'A' market-segment of motor vehicles. Although some Kei models are successfully exported or licensed, the great majority are designed and built for the Japanese domestic market only, as they are entirely optimized to offer the most appealing vehicles within the very specific to Japan Kei-car rules, in addition to mainly being built with the steering on the right.

Contrary to popular belief, according to the 1 January 1990 regulations, there is no official power limit for Kei cars. The limit is dictated by a gentleman's agreement among Japanese auto manufacturers, reached to prevent a horsepower race, as the most powerful Kei car at the time was rated at 64 PS (47 kW; 63 hp). It also means the cars remain true to the modest spirit of the Kei class, to charge lower tax on small vehicles that are just enough to meet basic transportation needs.

Kei car regulations
Date	Max. length	Max. width	Max. height	Max. displacement		Max. power ('gentleman's agreement between Japan's car- and lawmakers')
Date	Max. length	Max. width	Max. height	four-stroke	two-stroke	Max. power ('gentleman's agreement between Japan's car- and lawmakers')
8 July 1949	2.8 m (110 in)	1.0 m (39.4 in)	2.0 m (78.7 in)	150 cc (9.2 cu in)	100 cc (6.1 cu in)	—N/a
26 July 1950	3.0 m (118 in)	1.3 m (51.2 in)	2.0 m (78.7 in)	300 cc (18.3 cu in)	200 cc (12.2 cu in)	—N/a
16 August 1951	3.0 m (118 in)	1.3 m (51.2 in)	2.0 m (78.7 in)	360 cc (22.0 cu in)	240 cc (14.6 cu in)	—N/a
1 April 1955	3.0 m (118 in)	1.3 m (51.2 in)	2.0 m (78.7 in)	360 cc (22.0 cu in)		—N/a
1 January 1976	3.2 m (126 in)	1.4 m (55.1 in)	2.0 m (78.7 in)	550 cc (33.6 cu in)		—N/a
1 January 1990	3.3 m (130 in)	1.4 m (55.1 in)	2.0 m (78.7 in)	660 cc (40.3 cu in)		64 PS (47 kW; 63 hp)
1 October 1998	3.4 m (134 in)	1.48 m (58.3 in)	2.0 m (78.7 in)	660 cc (40.3 cu in)		64 PS (47 kW; 63 hp)

== History ==
=== Up to 360 cc era (1948–1975) ===
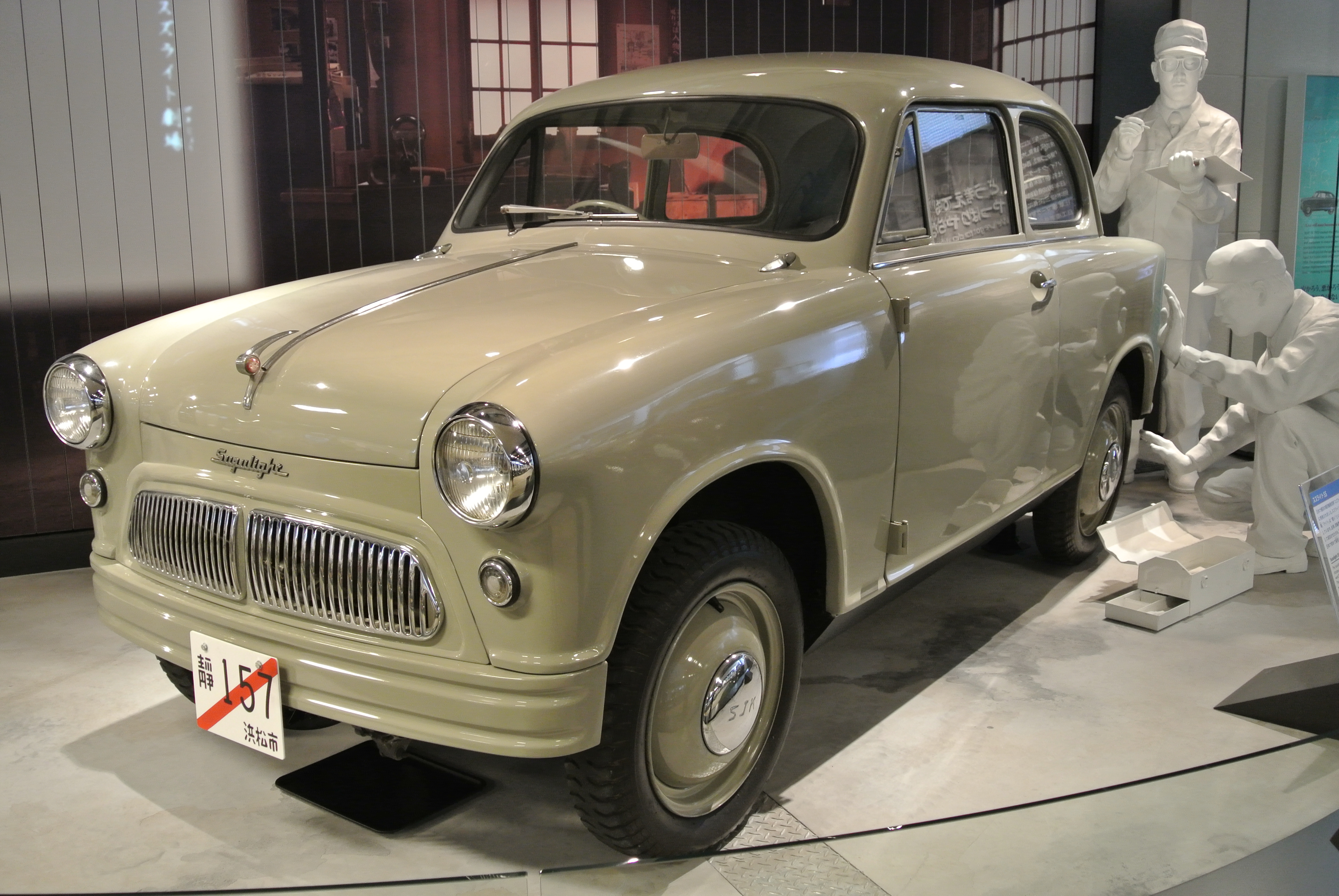
1958 Suzuki Suzulight SS

The kei legal class originated in the era following the end of World War II, when most Japanese citizens could not afford a full-sized car, though many had enough money to buy a light motorcycle. To stimulate growth of the car industry, as well as offer alternative commuting means, and small delivery vehicles for shops and businesses, the kei-car category, reduced tax-burden, and accompanying legal maximums for "essential transportation" vehicles were created. At first limited to a displacement of just 150 cc (or just 100 cc for two-stroke engines) in 1949, dimensions and engine size limitations were gradually expanded in 1950, 1951, and 1955, to make kei cars more attractive to buyers, and production more viable to manufacturers.

In 1955, the displacement limit was increased to 360 cc for both two-stroke and four-stroke engines, resulting in several new kei car models beginning production in the following years. These included the 1955 Suzuki Suzulight and the 1958 Subaru 360 (considered the first truly mass-produced kei cars), which were finally able to fill people's need for basic transportation without being too severely compromised. In 1955, the Japanese Ministry of International Trade and Industry (MITI) also set forth goals to develop a "national car" that was larger than kei cars produced at the time. This goal influenced Japanese automobile manufacturers to determine how best to focus their product development efforts for kei cars or the larger "national" cars. The small exterior dimensions and engine displacement reflected the driving environment in Japan, with speed limits in Japan realistically not exceeding 40 km/h (24.9 mph) in urban areas. Kei cars were not allowed to be driven any faster than 40 km/h until the mid-1960s, when the kei speed limit was increased to 60 km/h (37.3 mph). The early vehicles were comparable to the European 'bubble-cars' of the era.

In 1968, with the introduction of the Honda N360, the domestic market for kei passenger cars began to grow rapidly. Before the model was launched on March 6, 1968, the monthly kei passenger car market consisted of less than 10,000 cars. This had swelled to 16,000 cars by March 1968 and over 18,000 by May. In May 1968, the 5570th N360 was registered, making it the market leader. Most kei cars registered were still in the commercial class, however.

The class then went through a period of ever increasing sophistication, with an automatic transmission appearing in the Honda N360 in August 1968, and front disc brakes becoming available on a number of sporting kei cars, beginning with the Honda Z GS of January 1971. Power outputs also kept climbing, reaching a peak with the 40 PS (29 kW; 39 hp) Daihatsu Fellow Max SS of July 1970. Sales increased steadily, reaching a peak of 750,000 in 1970.

Until 31 December 1974, kei cars used smaller license plates than regular cars, at 230 mm × 125 mm (9.1 in × 4.9 in). From 1975, they received medium-sized standard plates, which are 330 mm × 165 mm (13.0 in × 6.5 in). To set them apart from regular passenger cars, the plates were now yellow and black rather than white and green.

=== 550 cc era (1976–1990) ===
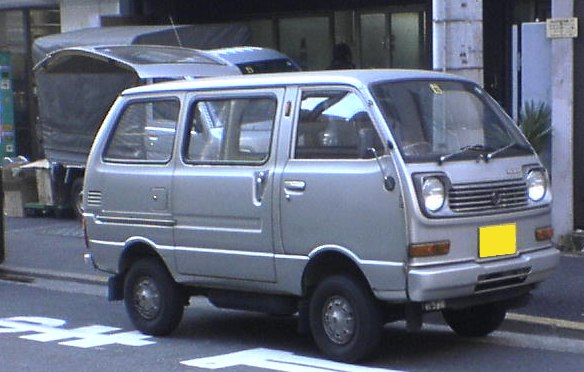
Daihatsu Hijet (S40)

Throughout the 1970s, the government kept whittling away at the benefits offered to kei vehicles, which combined with ever stricter emissions standards to lower sales drastically through the first half of the decade. Previously exempt, mandatory annual inspections for kei cars were added in 1973 and put an additional damper on sales. Honda and Mazda withdrew from the shrinking passenger kei car market in 1974 and 1976, respectively, although they both maintained a limited offering of commercial vehicles. Sales had been steadily declining, reaching a low of 150,000 passenger cars in 1975, 80% less than 1970 sales.

Emissions laws were another problem for the kei car industry in the mid-1970s. From 1973 to 1978, emissions standards were to be tightened in four steps. Meeting the stricter standards, which were to be introduced in 1975, would be problematic for manufacturers of kei cars. This was particularly hard for Daihatsu and Suzuki, which focused on two-stroke engines, and especially Suzuki, a relatively small company whose entire lineup consisted of two-stroke kei cars. Daihatsu, though, had both the engineering backing and powerful connections of their owner, Toyota, to aid them in meeting the new requirements. All manufacturers of kei cars were clamoring for increased engine displacement and vehicle size limits, claiming that the emissions standards could not be met with a functional 360-cc engine. In the end, the Japanese legislature relented, increasing the overall length and width restrictions by 200 mm (7.9 in) and 100 mm (3.9 in), respectively. Engine size was increased to 550 cc, taking effect from 1 January 1976. The new standards were announced on 26 August 1975, leaving very little time for manufacturers to revise their designs to take advantage of the new limits.

Most manufacturers were somewhat surprised by the decision; having expected a 500 cc (30.5 cu in) limit, they had already developed new engines to fit such restrictions. These new engines were quickly introduced, usually mounted within widened bodies of existing models. These interim versions, with displacements ranging between 443 and 490 cc, were "feelers", developed to see if a continued market existed for the kei car. As sales improved, these engines only lasted for a model year or so until manufacturers had the time to develop maximum-sized engines. Only Daihatsu had a 550 cc engine ready and thus avoided developing transitional engines that did not immediately take full advantage of the new regulations. Kei car sales remained stagnant, however; while combined passenger and commercial kei car sales reached 700,000 for the first time since 1974, the small cars still lost market share in a quickly growing market.

As the kei cars became larger and more powerful, another benefit appeared as exports increased considerably. In particular, export sales of kei trucks increased, while kei passenger car exports increased at a lower rate. In 1976, the number of exported kei cars and trucks combined was 74,633 (up 171% year-on-year), despite exports of passenger kei cars decreasing. In 1980, another record year occurred as exports grew by 80.3% (to 94,301 units), of which 77.6% were microtrucks. Nearly 17% of exports went to Europe, dwarfed by Chile, which took nearly a quarter of the exported kei vehicles.

Due to the difficult economic environment, low-priced cars sold well at the turn of the decade; 1981 marked another successful year as Japanese kei car sales reached their highest since 1970 (at 1,229,809 units for cars and trucks). This was also thanks to a new phenomenon: To help boost their sales, Suzuki developed a new car which could be sold as a commercial vehicle although it was really intended for private use, thus avoiding the 15.5% excise tax. Efficient, bare bones design meant that the resulting Suzuki Alto was considerably cheaper than any of its competitors, and it set the tone for kei cars for the entire 1980s. Until the excise tax was abolished in 1989, light commercials like the Alto and its competitors nearly completely supplanted the passenger car versions.

As the 1980s progressed, kei cars became increasingly refined, losing their utilitarian origins, as Japanese customers became ever better off. Features such as electric windows, turbochargers, four-wheel drive, and air conditioning became available on kei-car models. Conversely, van versions of kei hatchbacks were now marketed to non-business customers to take advantage of even lower taxation and more lenient emissions rules; this move in the market was spearheaded by Suzuki with their 1979 Alto, and competitors soon followed suit, with the Subaru Family Rex and the Daihatsu Mira appearing within a year's time.

In the 1980s, the speed limit for kei cars was 80 km/h (50 mph). Government rules also mandated a warning chime to alert the driver if this speed was exceeded.

=== 660 cc era (1990–2014) ===
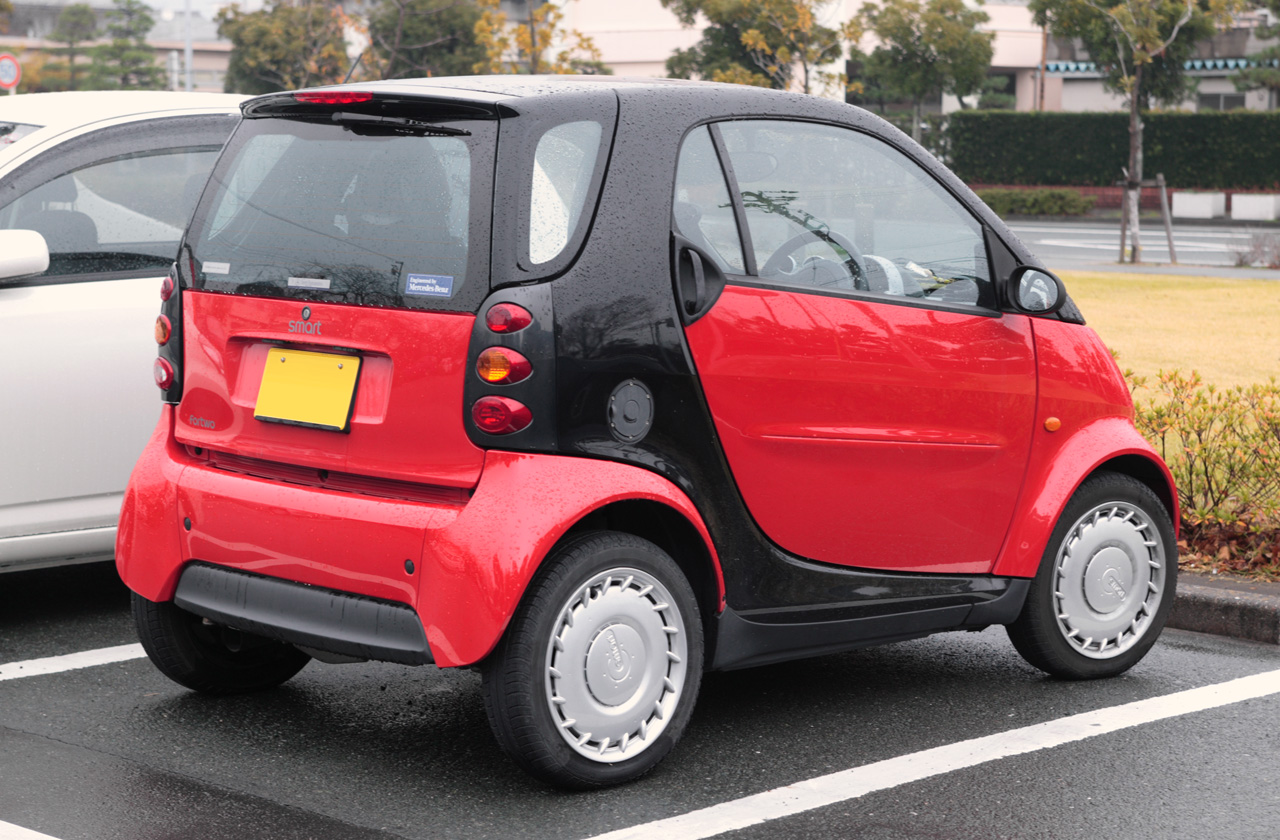
Smart K

The kei car regulations were revised in March 1990, allowing engines a displacement increase of 110 cc (6.7 cu in), or twenty percent, while the maximum length was increased by 100 mm (3.9 in). These changes occurred during the 1990s Japanese economic bubble, and all manufacturers quickly developed new models to suit. Within five months, all major kei models had switched from 550 cc to 660 cc engines.

For the first time, a power limit of 64 PS (47 kW; 63 hp) was also applied in addition to the limit on engine size, in response to the ever-increasing power outputs available with turbocharging and multivalve technologies popularized in the late 1980s. Engine technology was also shared with sports bikes, which are designed more for rider enjoyment and less so for fuel economy, going against the idea of small people's cars and putting the kei cars' tax and structural advantages at risk of a governmental backlash. This power limit matched the highest output reached by any kei manufacturer at the time and was a gentlemen's agreement amongst the manufacturers in an effort to avoid a kei-class horsepower war. The only kei car to have exceeded this limit is the Caterham 7 160, a lightweight British sports car that was not expected to qualify as a kei car, though it is small enough (in dimensions and displacement) to fit the regulations. Its engine is rated at 80 PS (59 kW; 79 hp)—since that is how the car is homologated in the United Kingdom, Japanese authorities told the importer that its power should remain unchanged. The Japan Automobile Manufacturers Association also self-imposes a speed limit of 140 km/h (87 mph) for kei cars.

Kei cars were rather unsafe in accidents, and as a response, the Ministry of Transport decided to increase the standards. New kei cars would have to pass additional tests, including a head-on collision at 50 km/h (31 mph) and a side impact test. To enable manufacturers to fit additional reinforcements and crumple zones, the maximum overall length and widths were both increased by 100 mm (3.9 in). The new rules went into effect on 1 October 1998 and all manufacturers introduced revised lineups to meet the new requirements. This was the largest, simultaneous introductions of new models in Japanese automotive history.

In a rare example of an overseas mass-produced model being sold as a kei car in Japan, a kei version of the Smart Fortwo (called the Smart K) was sold in Japan by Yanase from 2001 to 2004. The Smart K used revised rear fenders and reduced tire dimensions and track width to conform to kei regulations. The model was not a success, and sold the fewest examples of a kei car when it was marketed.

The Suzuki Wagon R was the best-selling kei car in Japan between calendar years 1996 and 2011, except in 2003, when the Daihatsu Move outsold the Wagon R.

The process of consolidation in the kei class continued when, in 2008, Subaru announced that they would no longer develop and build their own kei vehicles. As Toyota had recently taken a stake in the company, Subaru was to sell rebadged Daihatsus instead to focus on their core vehicles and exports. The last true Subaru kei car left the band on the last day of February 2012, after 7.97 million examples had been built by the company over 54 years. Starting in 2011, Toyota entered the kei car market for the first time. The resulting Toyota Pixis Space, a rebadged Daihatsu Move Conte, which was expected to increase competition in that market. Nissan and Mitsubishi began to jointly produce the Mitsubishi eK (also sold as the Nissan Dayz and formerly the Nissan Otti). Honda's kei car lineup—the N-one, N-Box, and N-WGN—accounted for around a quarter of the company's overall sales.

=== Reduced incentives (2014–present) ===
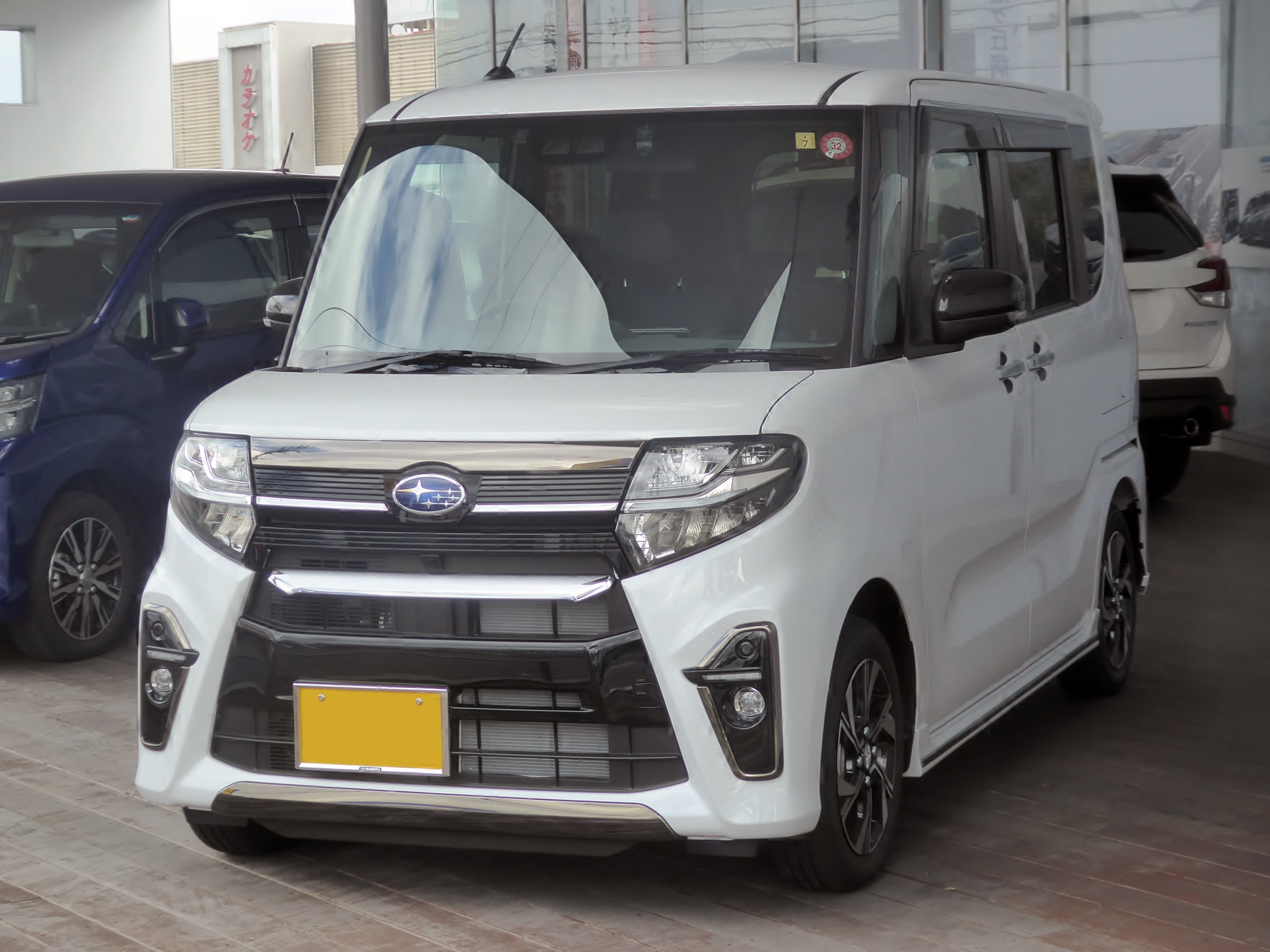
Subaru Chiffon

In April 2014, the Japanese government significantly reduced advantages for kei car owners, imposing a higher sales tax, a higher gasoline tax, and a higher kei car tax, the last of which was raised by 50 percent—greatly reducing tax benefits compared to regular-sized cars.

Daihatsu, Honda, Suzuki and Nissan-Mitsubishi (through the NMKV joint venture) are currently the only mass-production manufacturers of kei cars. Mazda sells rebadged Suzuki models, Toyota and Subaru sell badge-engineered Daihatsu models, and Nissan-Mitsubishi sources their commercial kei models from Suzuki.

== Electric kei cars ==
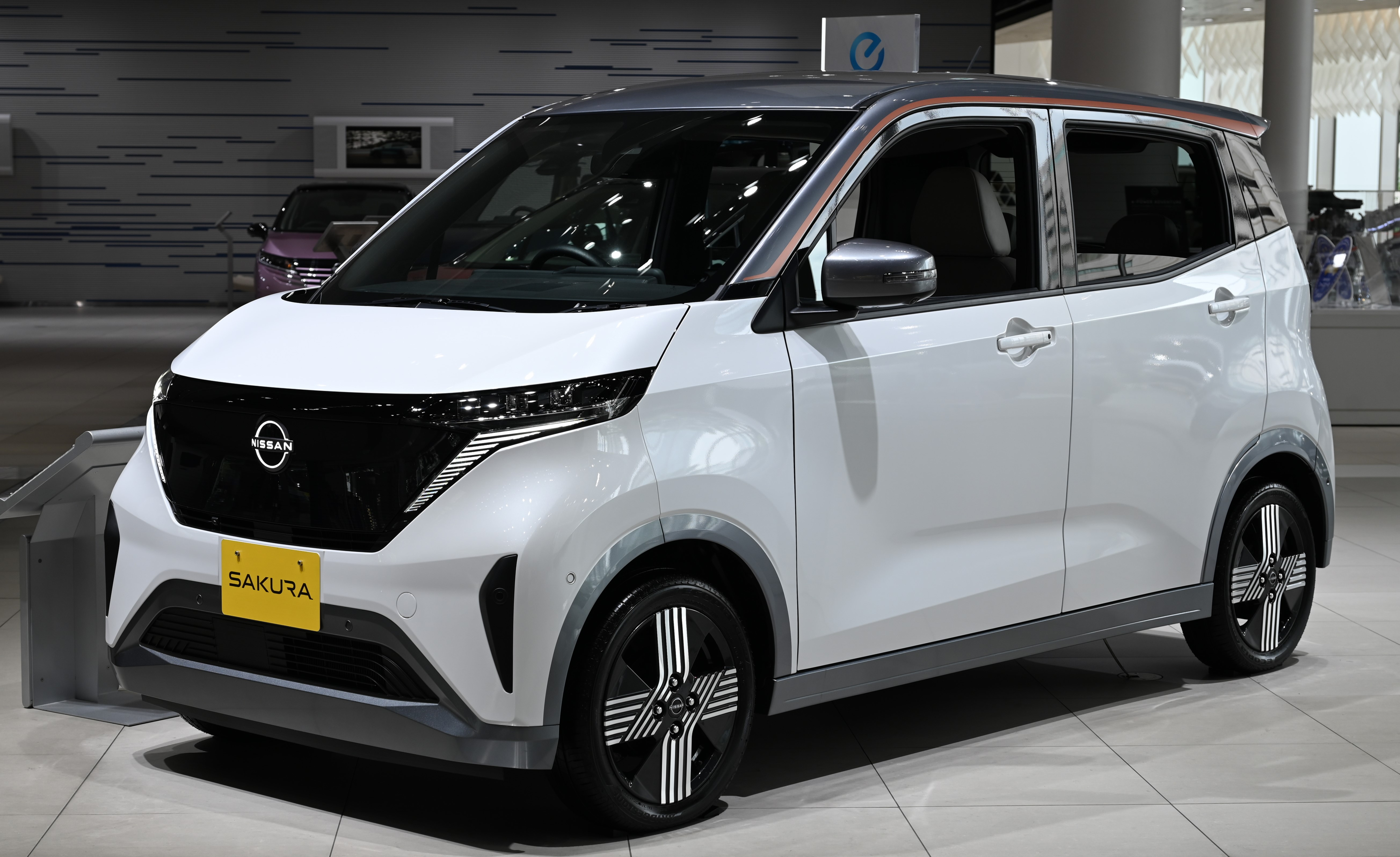
Nissan Sakura

The electric version of the Mitsubishi i, the Mitsubishi i-MiEV was the first electric kei car. This was launched for fleet purchasers in 2009 in the Japanese domestic market. It became available to the wider public as well as the global market in 2010. The i-MiEV uses a 47 kW (63 hp) permanent-magnet synchronous motor powered by a 16 kWh lithium-ion battery pack. It can charge overnight in 14 hours from home 100-volt mains, or in 30 minutes from quick-charging stations installed at fleet locations. Its range is 100 km (62 mi) as tested by the US EPA, and 160 km (99 mi) as tested by the Japanese Transport Ministry. It was the world's first mass-produced electric car, and the first electric car to sell more than 10,000 units.

Rebadged and slightly updated variants of the i-MiEV were also sold in Europe as the Peugeot iOn and Citroën C-Zero. In 2011, Mitsubishi launched the MINICAB-MiEV; a battery electric version of the Minicab microvan, borrowing the drivetrain and key components from the i-MiEV. As of March 2015, over 50,000 units across all variants (including the two minicab versions sold in Japan) have been sold worldwide since 2009. Production of the i-MiEV was discontinued in 2021.

In May 2022, NMKV launched the Nissan-badged Sakura and the Mitsubishi-badged eK X EV in the Japanese domestic market. These models have a 20 kWh lithium-ion battery pack with an estimated WLTC range of 180 km (110 mi). Both use a single electric motor with a maximum output of 47 kW (63 hp; 64 PS). The eK X EV is a battery-electric version of the Mitsubishi eK X, and the Sakura is an update to Nissan's Dayz line. The two are eligible for EV purchase incentives in Japan, and as of June 2022, are also the cheapest new BEVs from a major Japanese manufacturer.

In September 2025, Honda has started selling the N-One e: with an estimated WLTC range of 295 km (183 mi).

In October 2025, BYD introduced the Racco, the first dedicated electric kei car from a non-Japanese maker.

== Taxation ==
The required road tax is based on the engine's displacement. As of 2014, the vehicle excise tax levy was 2% of the purchase price, compared to 3% at that time, for a regular car. An automobile weight tax also is levied, and paid after the vehicle has passed its safety inspection.

== Gallery ==
360 cc era

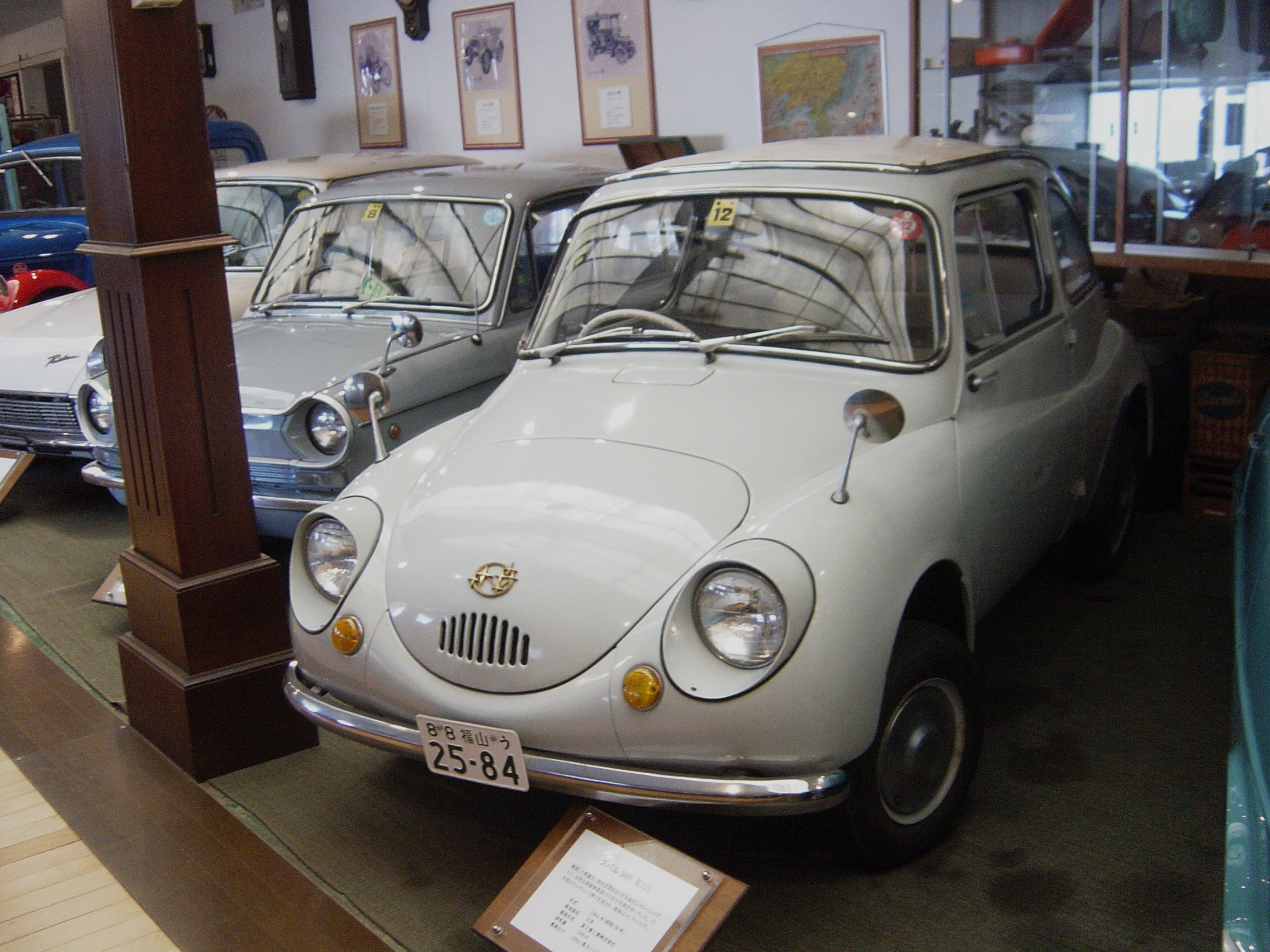
Subaru 360
(1958–1970)

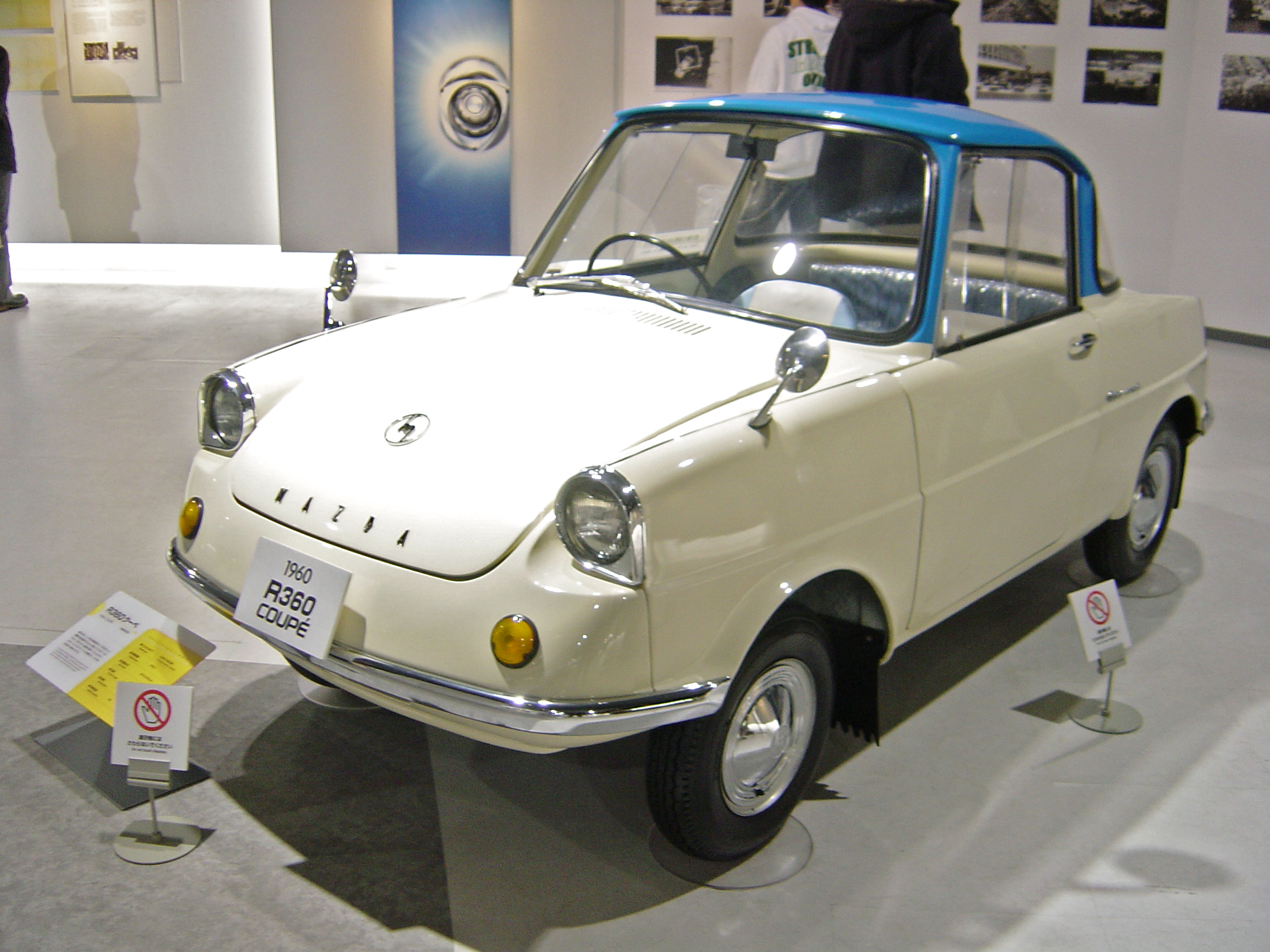
Mazda R360
(1960–1969)

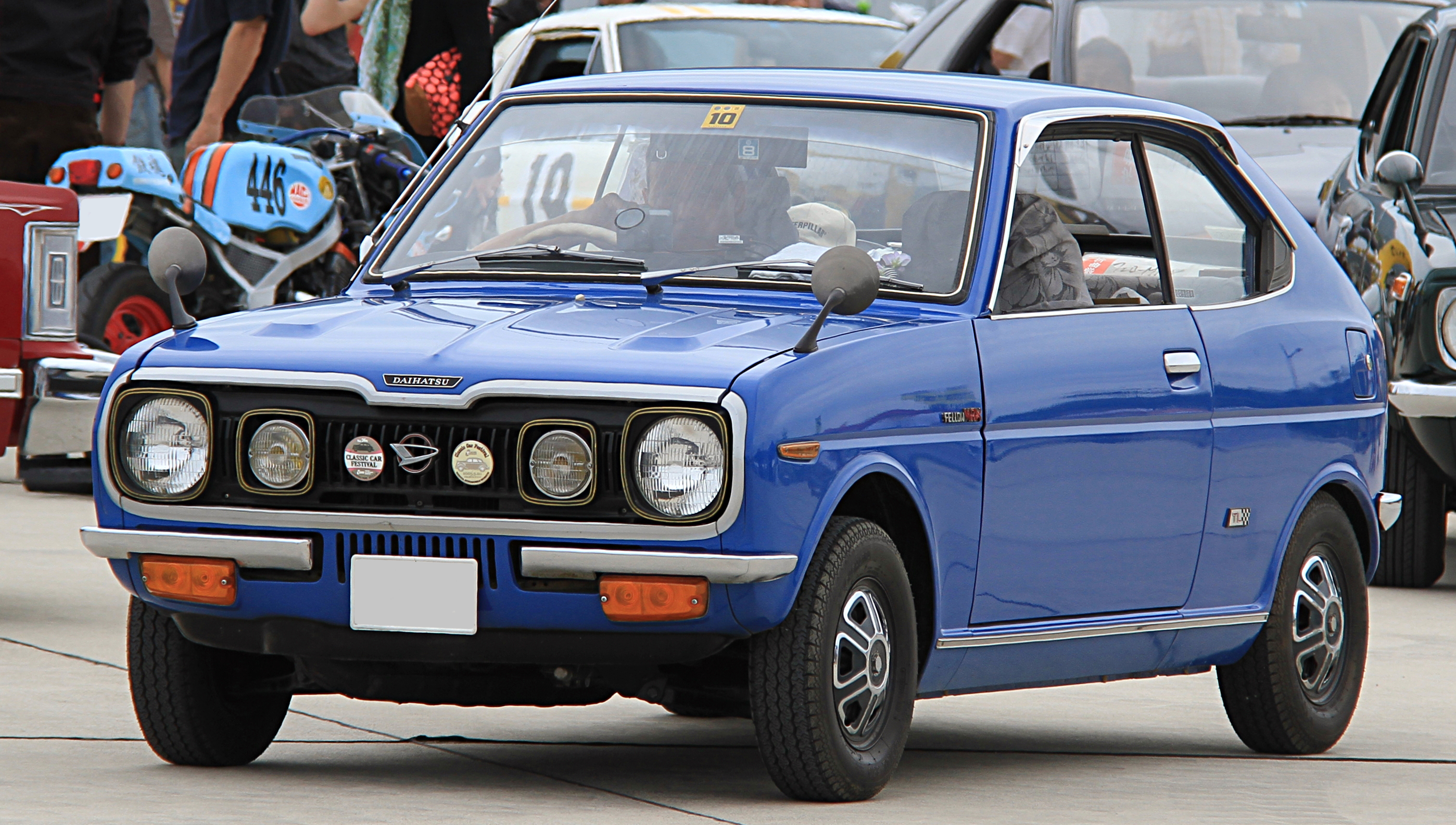
Daihatsu Fellow
(1970–1976)

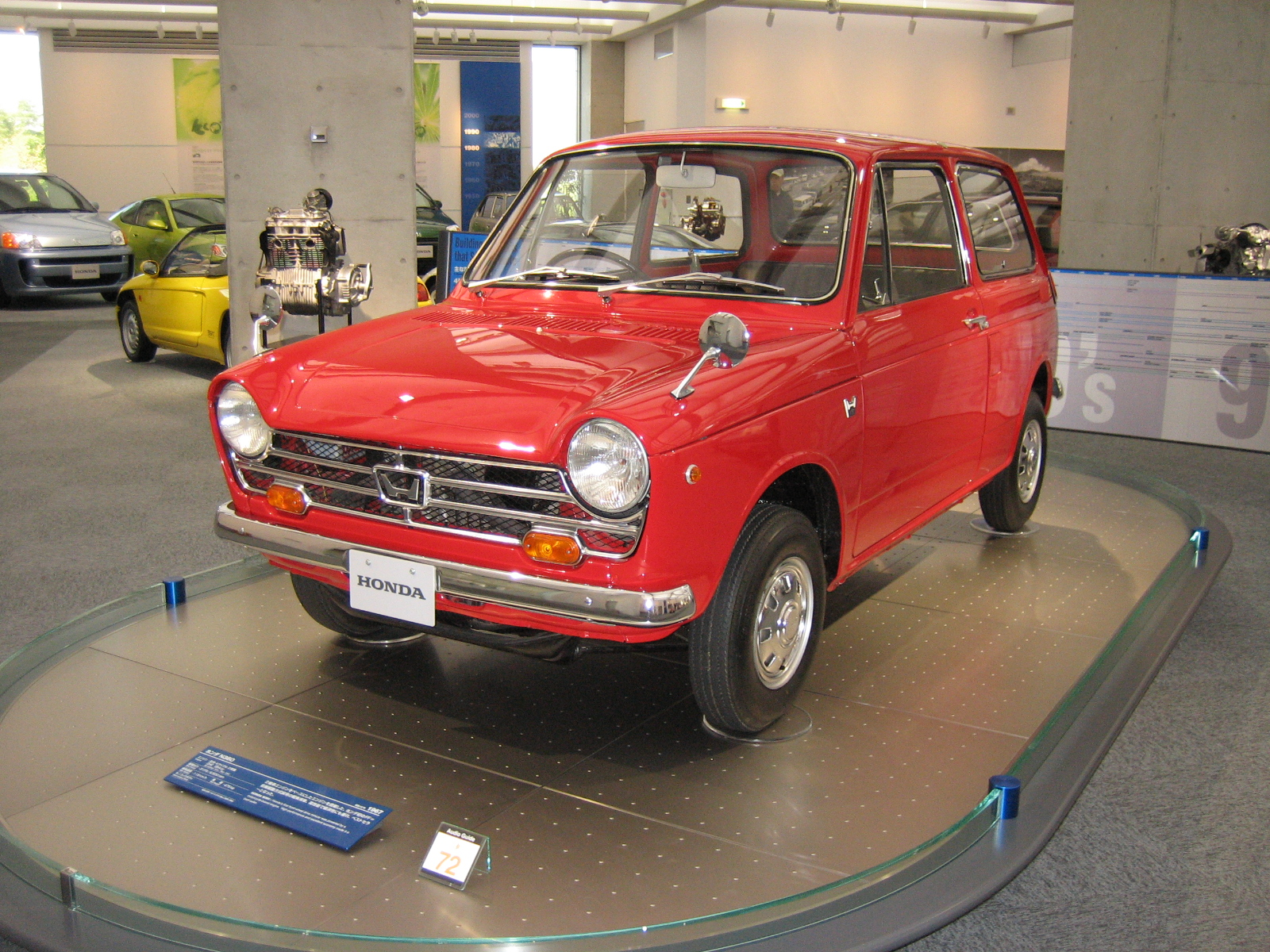
Honda N360
(1967–1972)

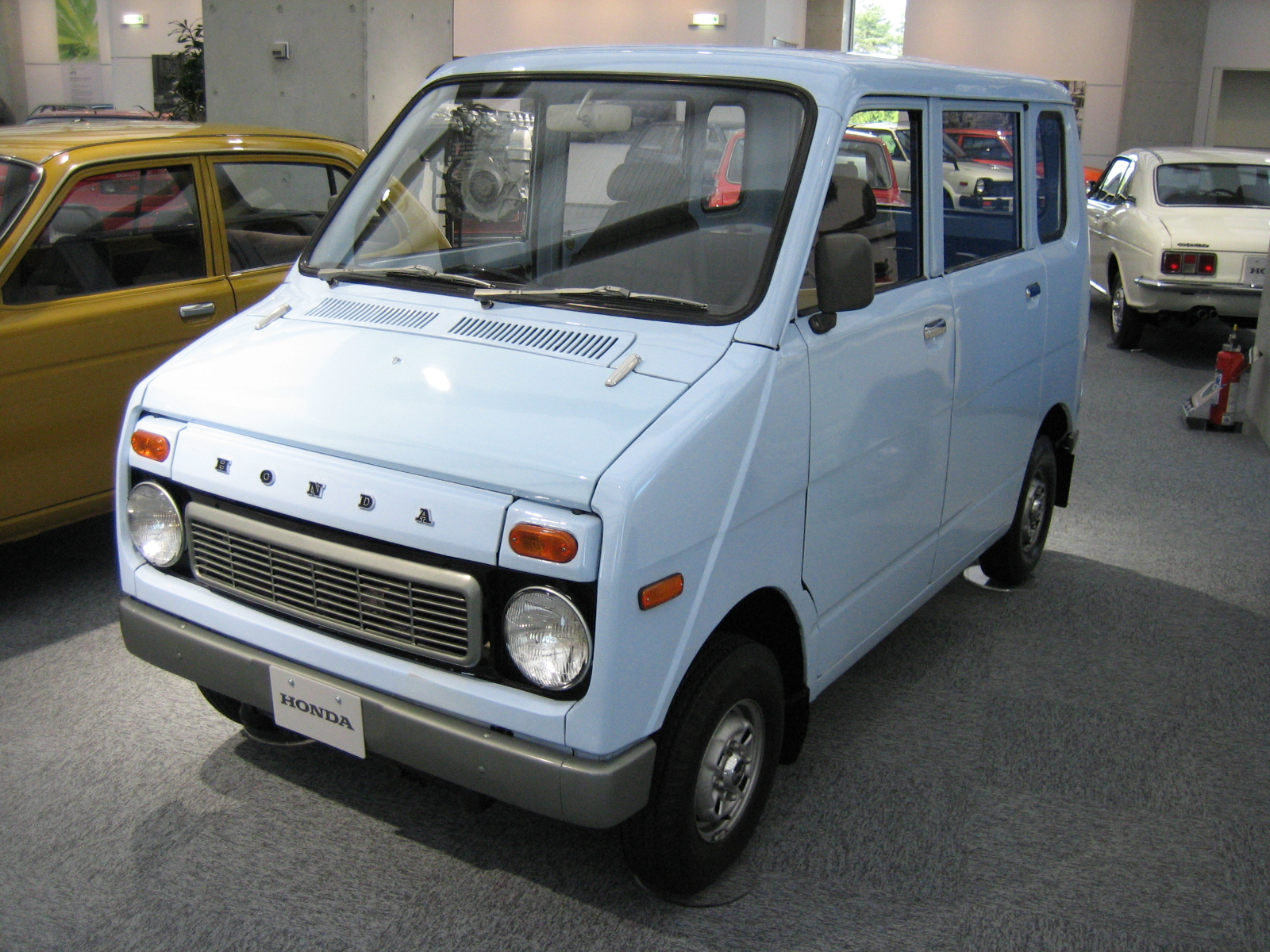
Honda Life Step Van
(1972–1974)

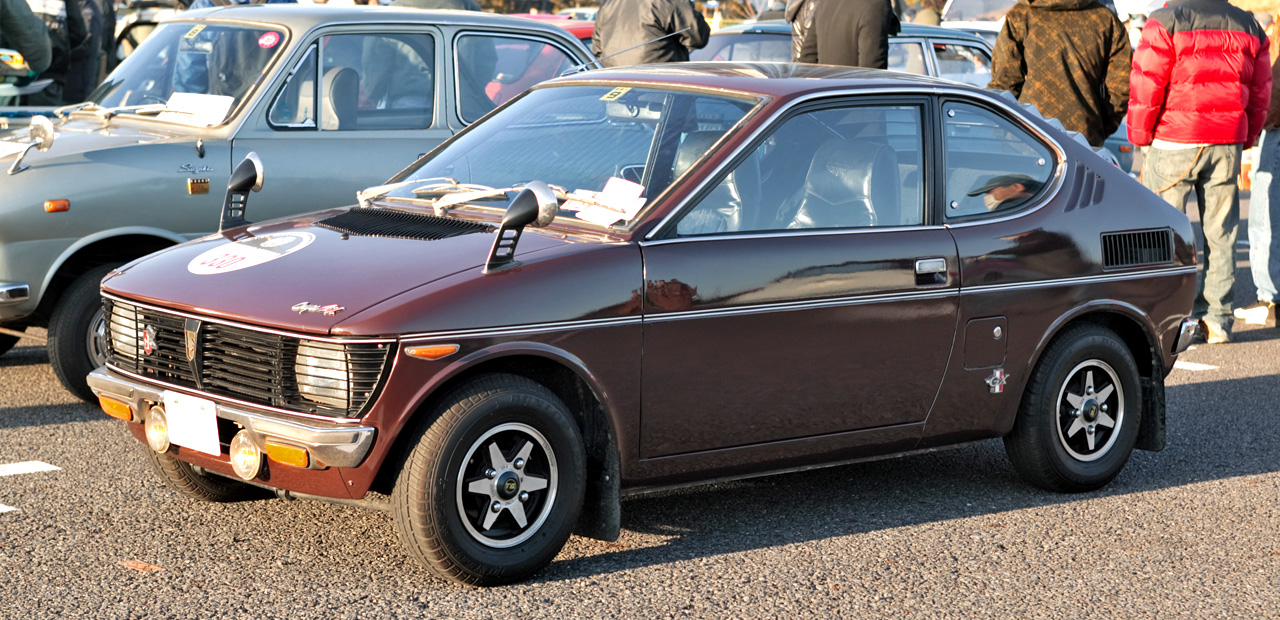
Suzuki Fronte Coupé
(1971–1976)

550 cc era

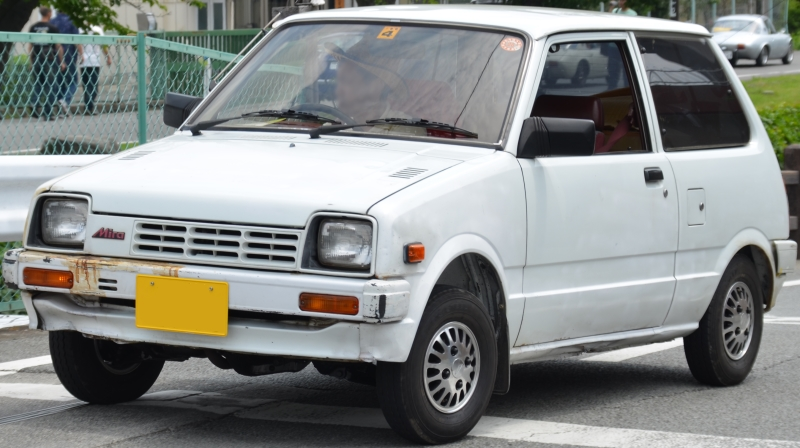
Daihatsu Mira
(1980–2018)

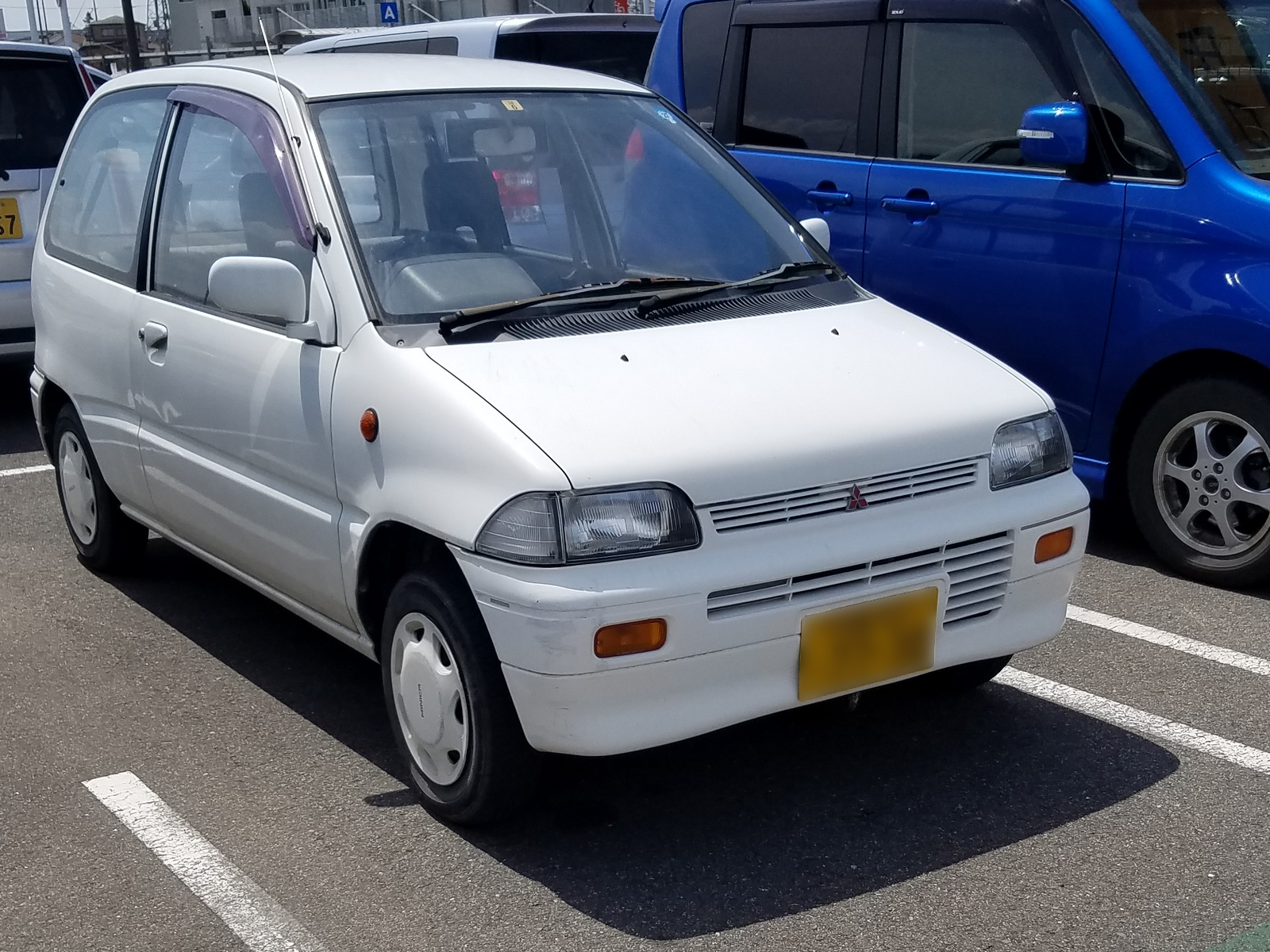
Mitsubishi Minica
(1962–2011)

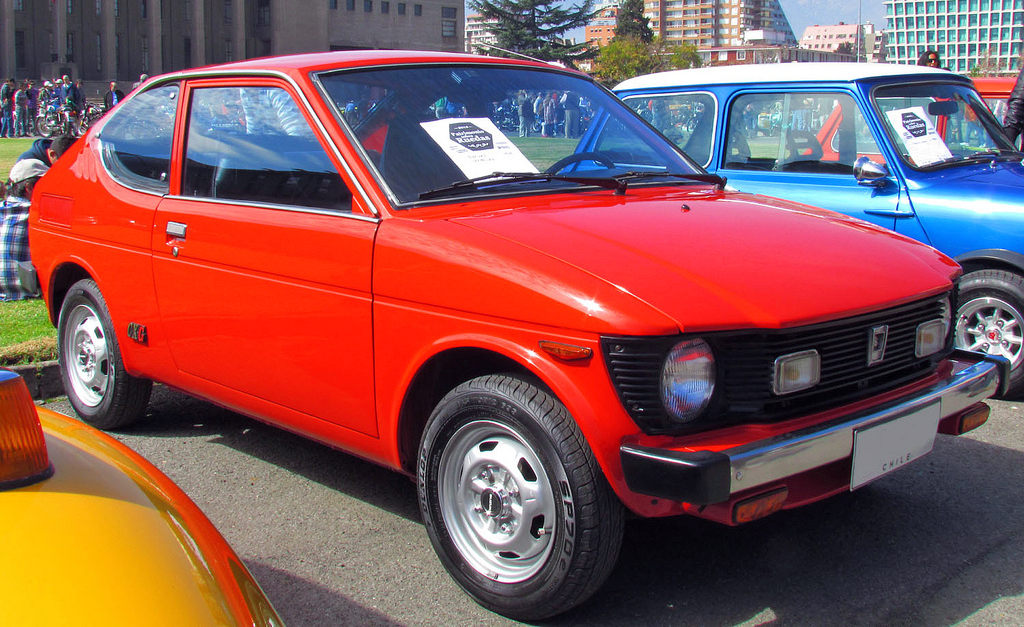
Suzuki Cervo (exported as the Suzuki SC100)
(1977–1982)

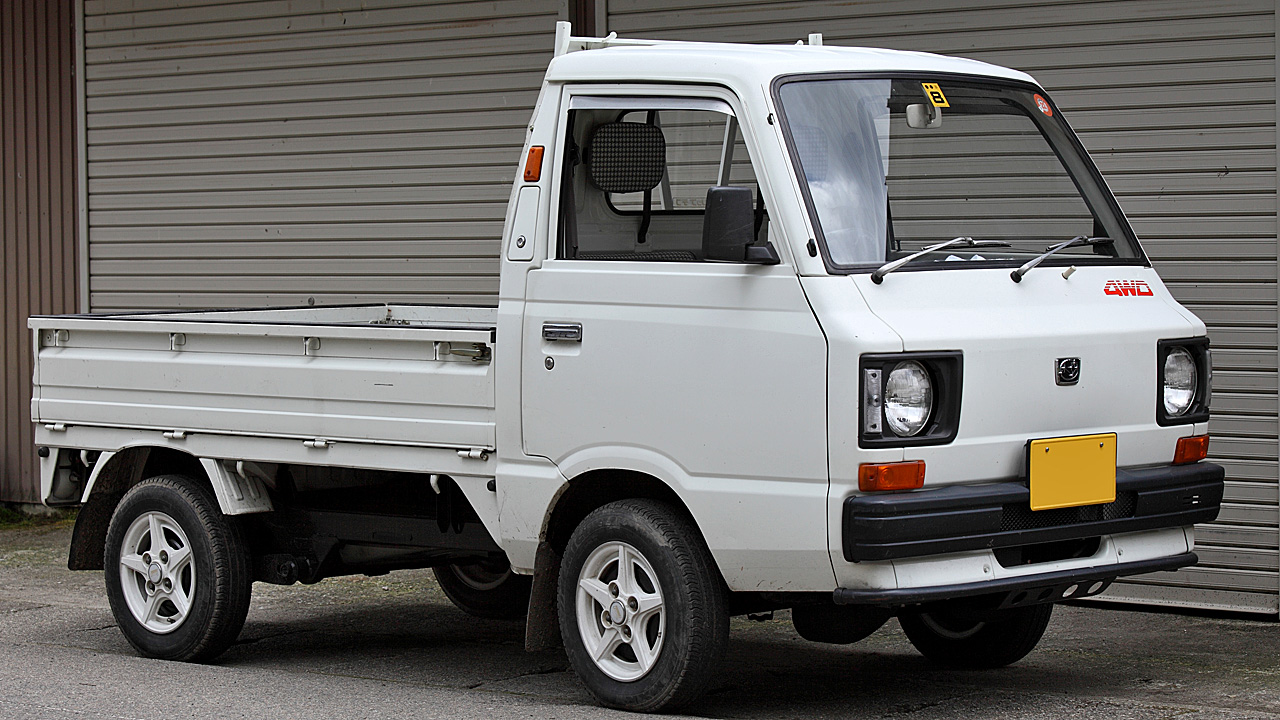
Subaru Sambar
(1961–present)

Kei sports cars

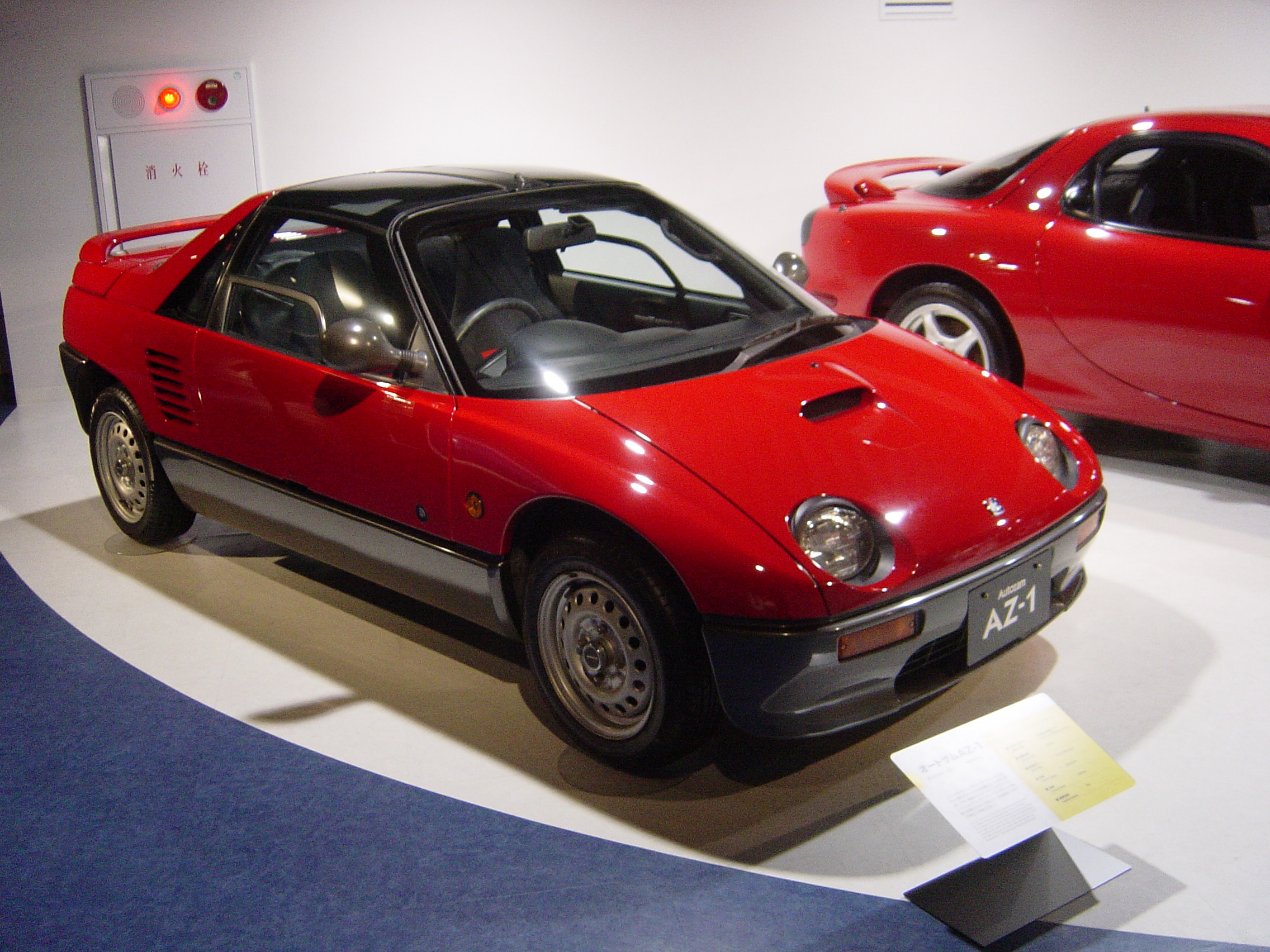
Autozam AZ-1
(1992–1994)

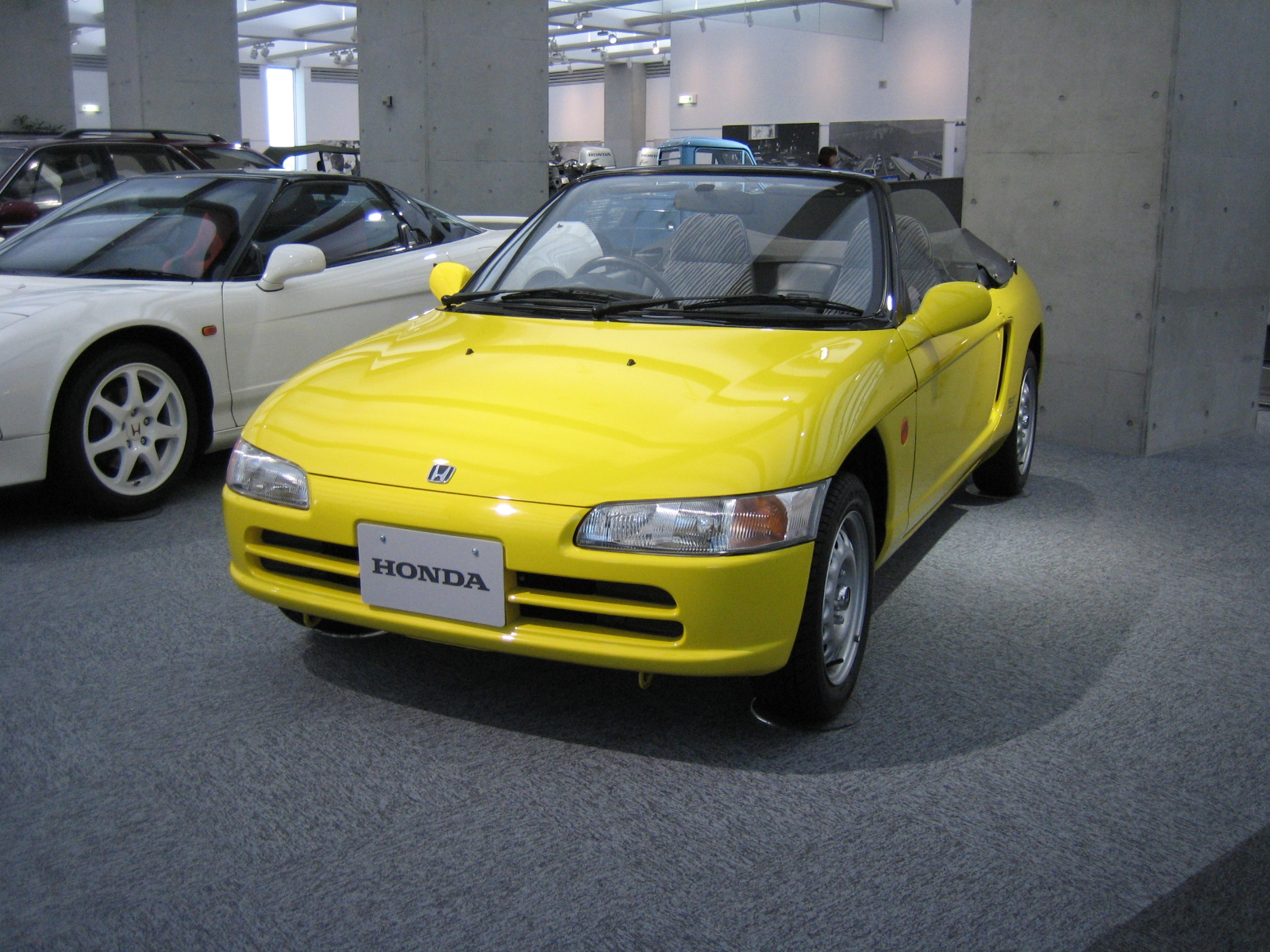
Honda Beat
(1991–1996)

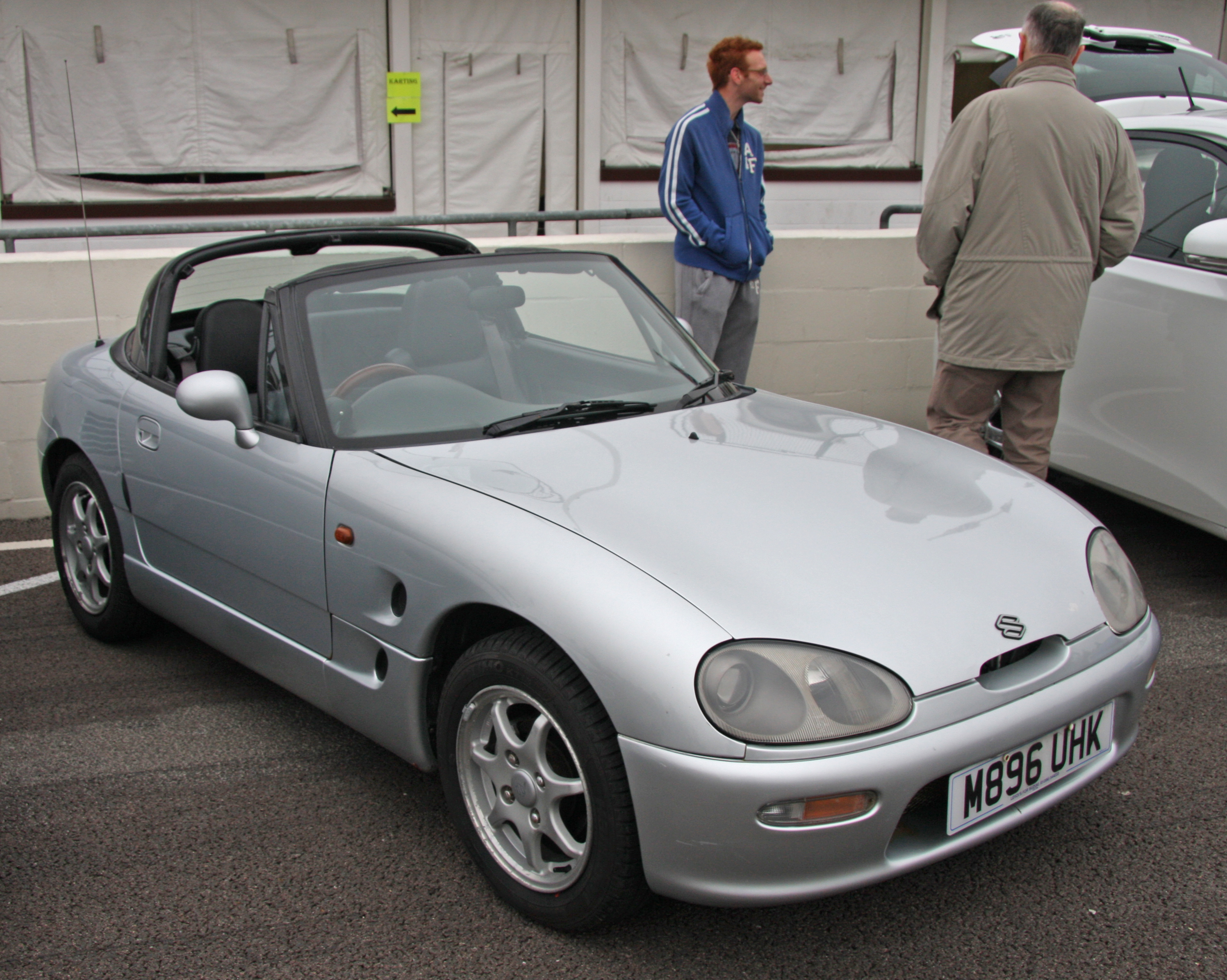
Suzuki Cappuccino
(1991–1998)

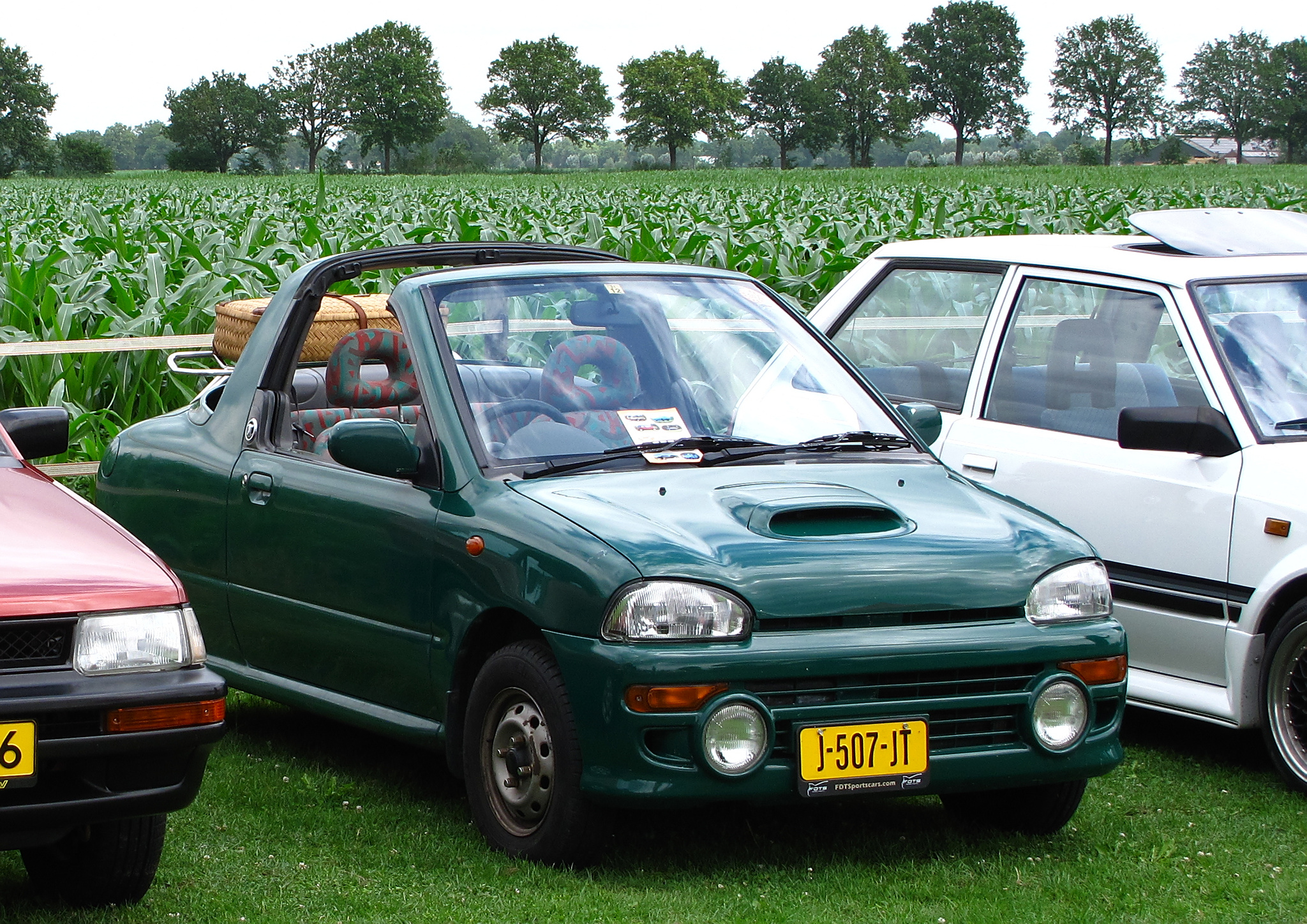
Subaru Vivio T-top
(1993–1994)

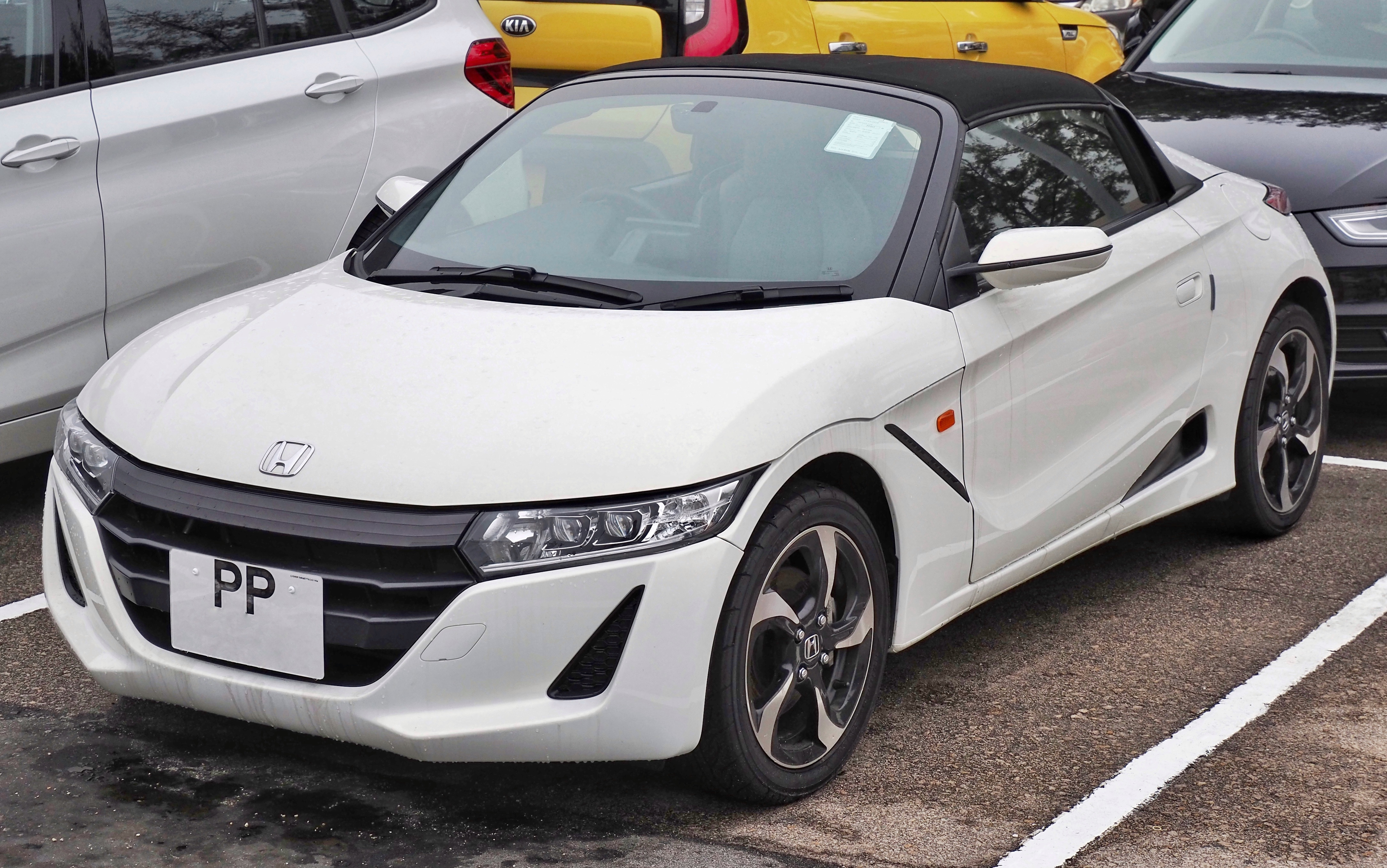
Honda S660
(2015–2022)

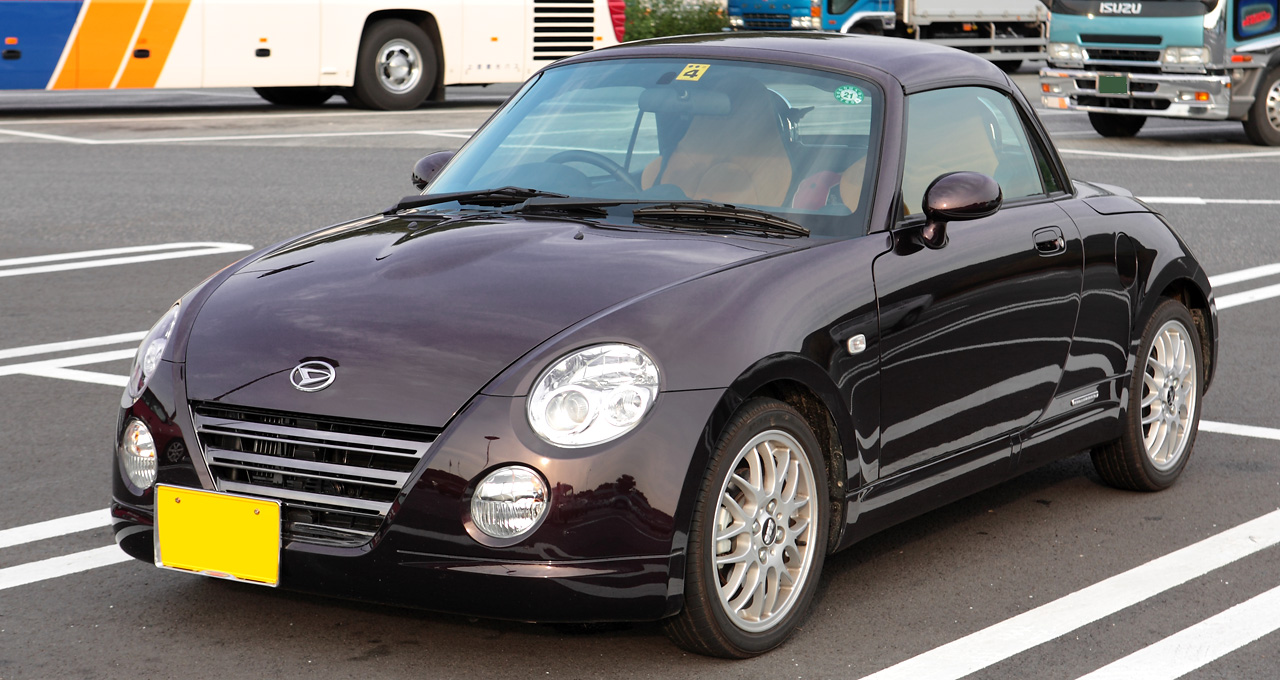
Daihatsu Copen
(2002–2012, 2014–present)

Caterham 7 170

Kei off-road cars

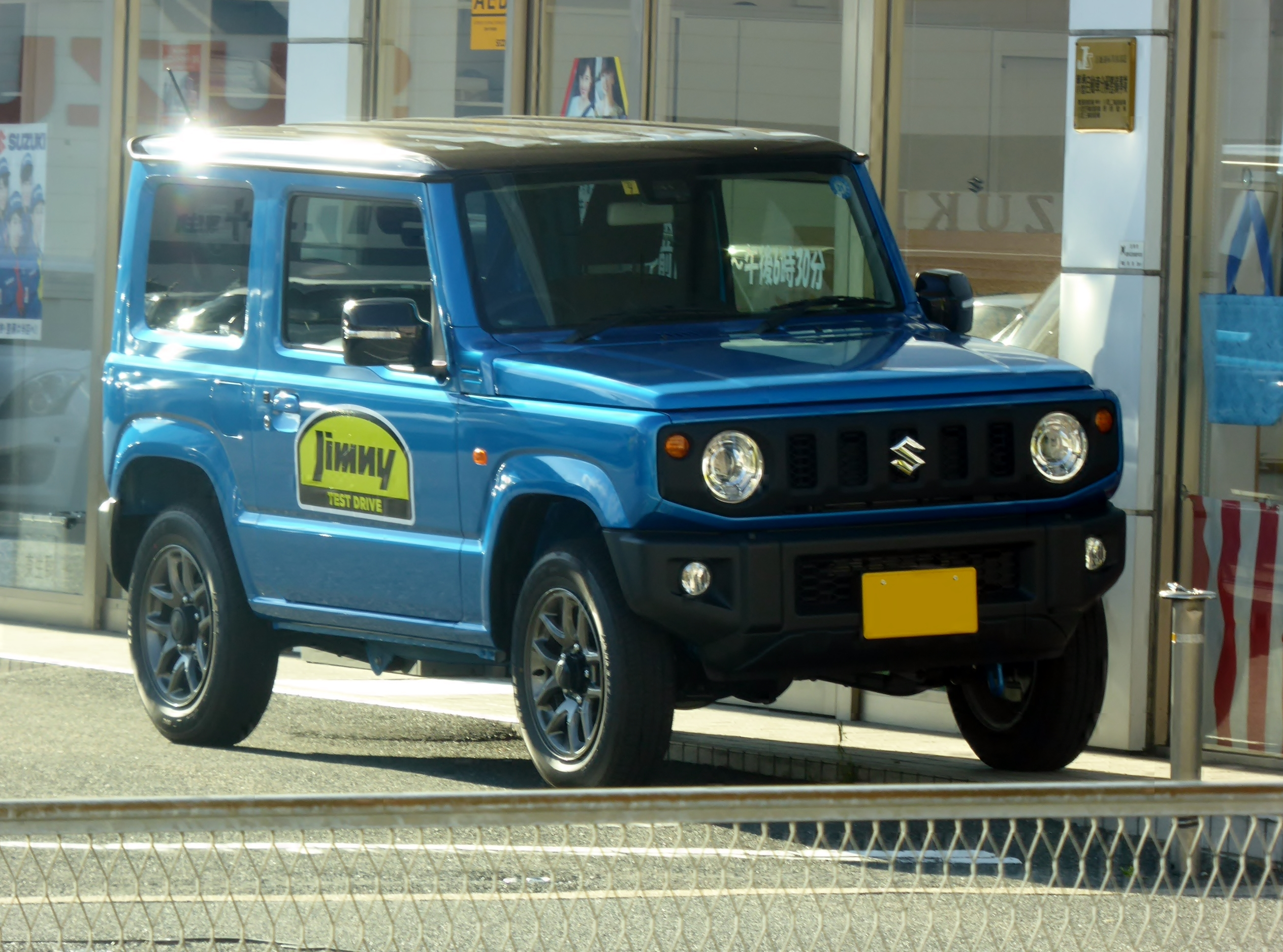
Suzuki Jimny
(1970–present)

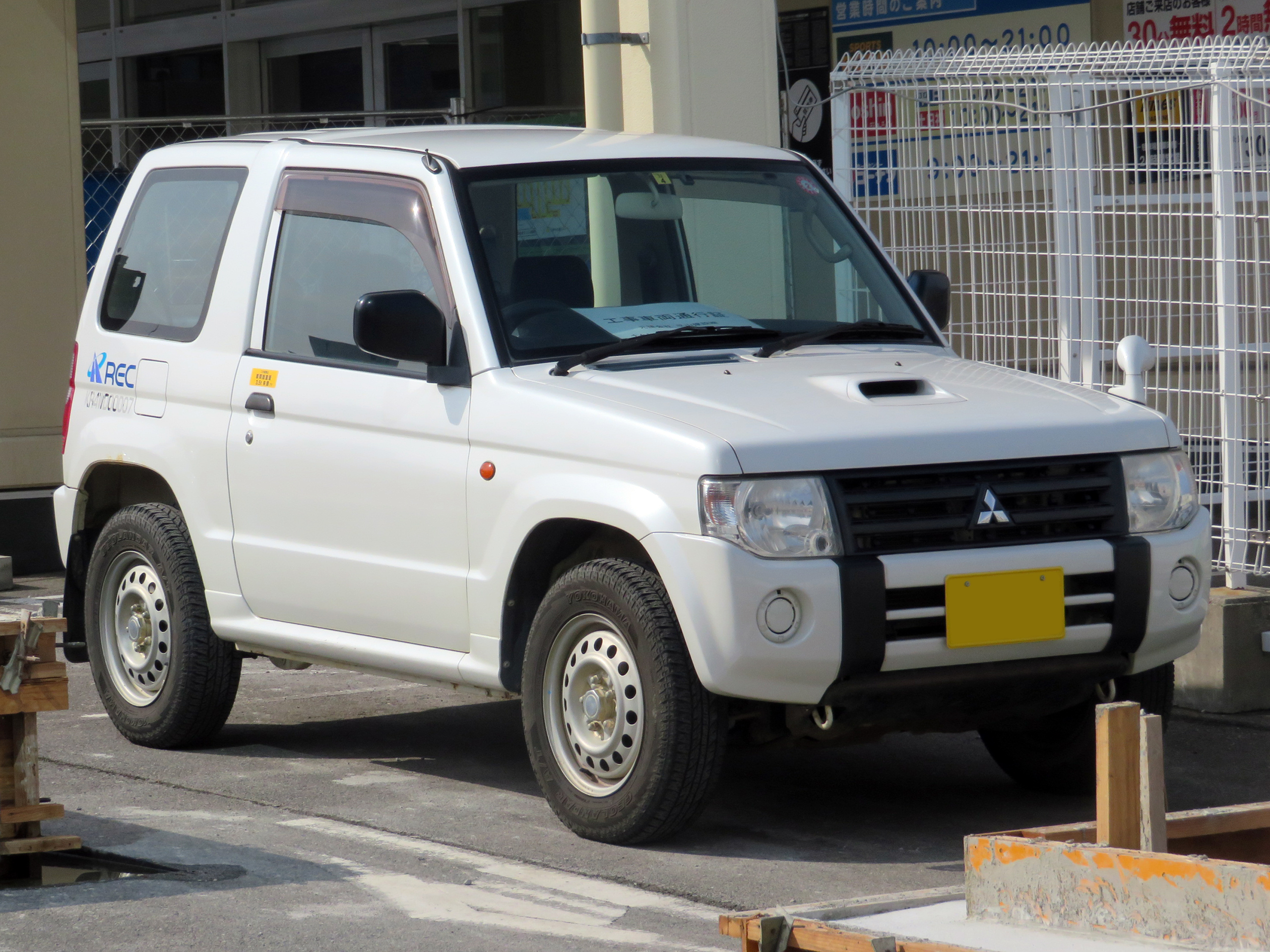
Mitsubishi Pajero Mini
(1994–2012)

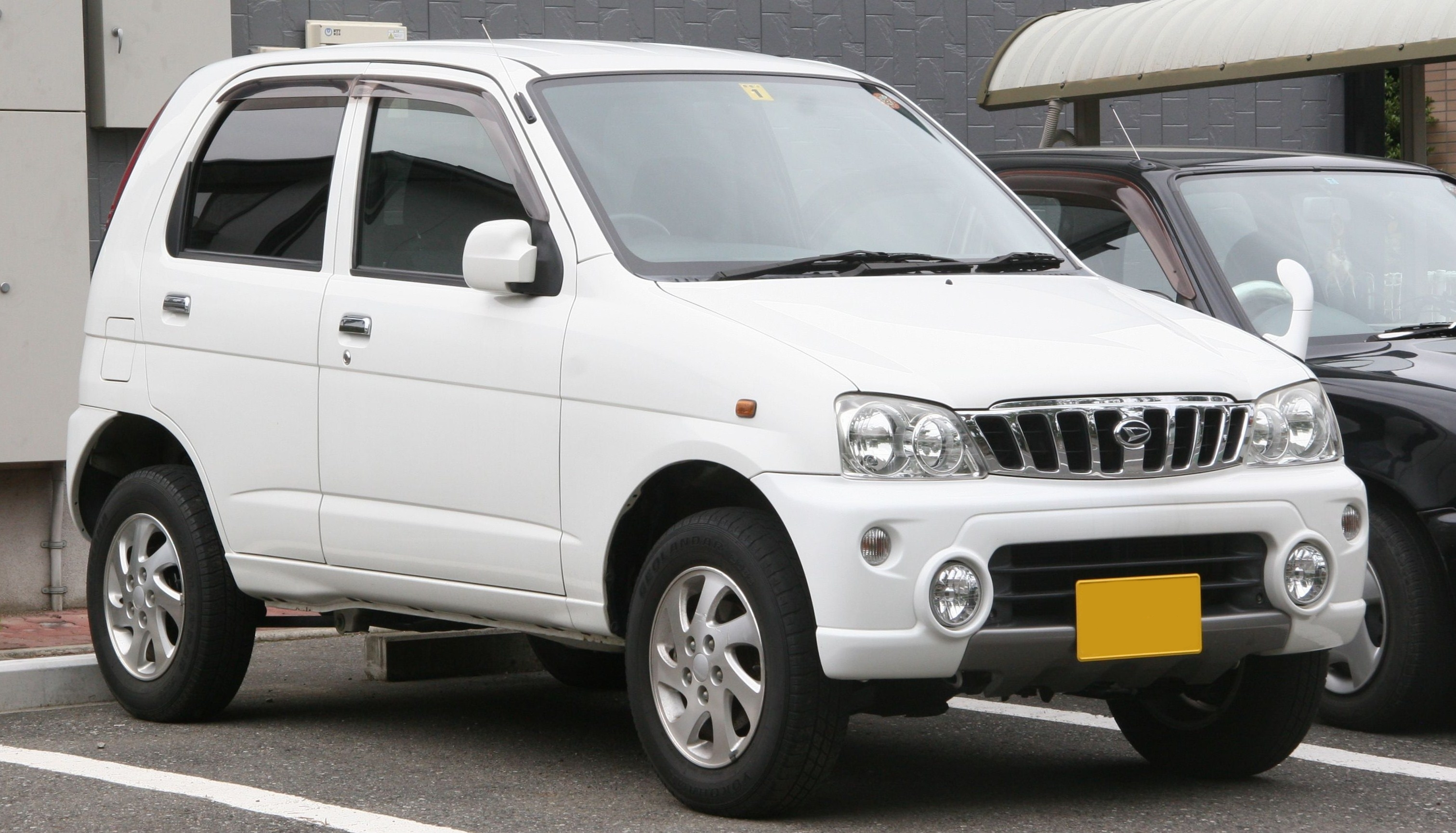
Daihatsu Terios Kid
(1998–2012)

Present

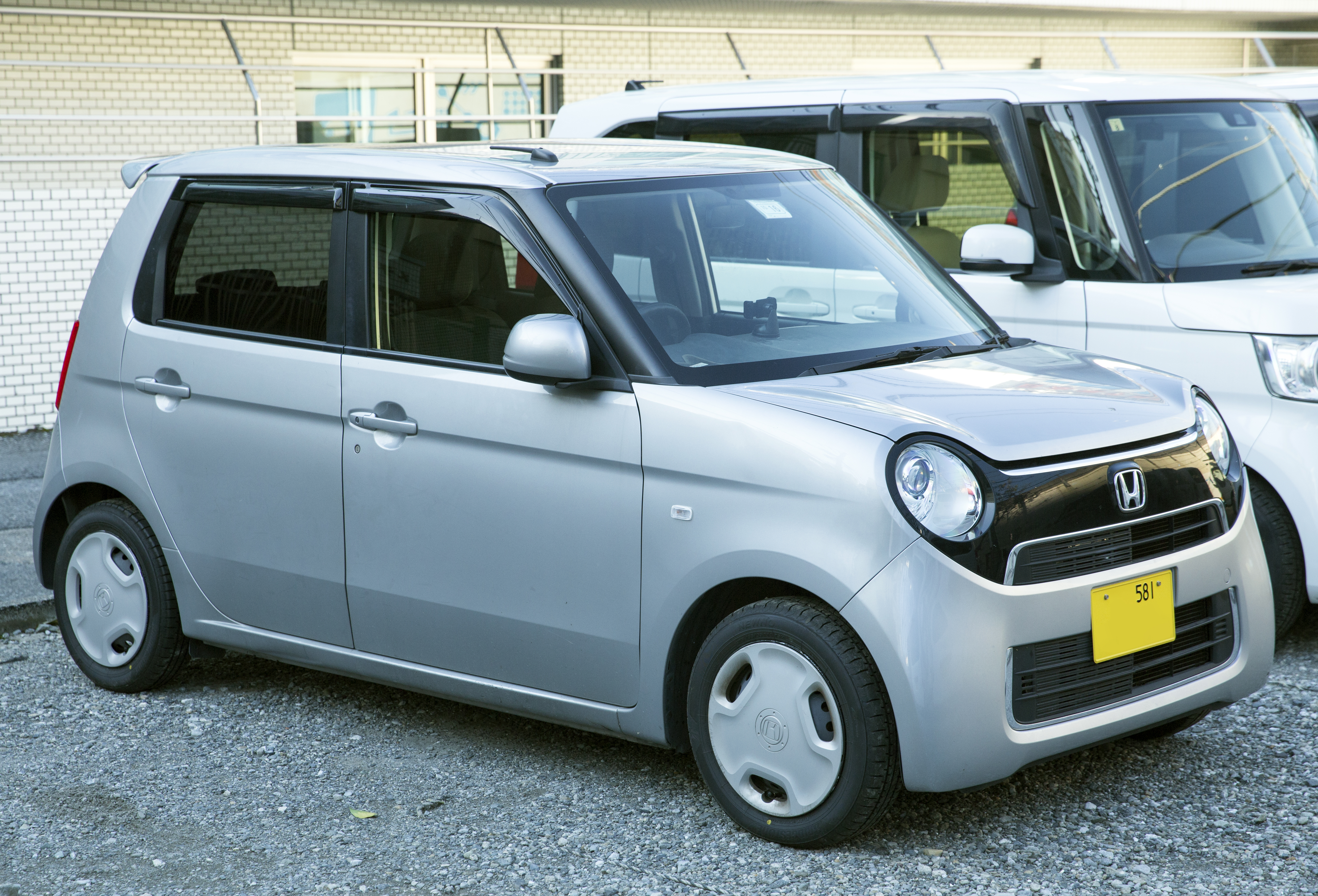
Honda N-One

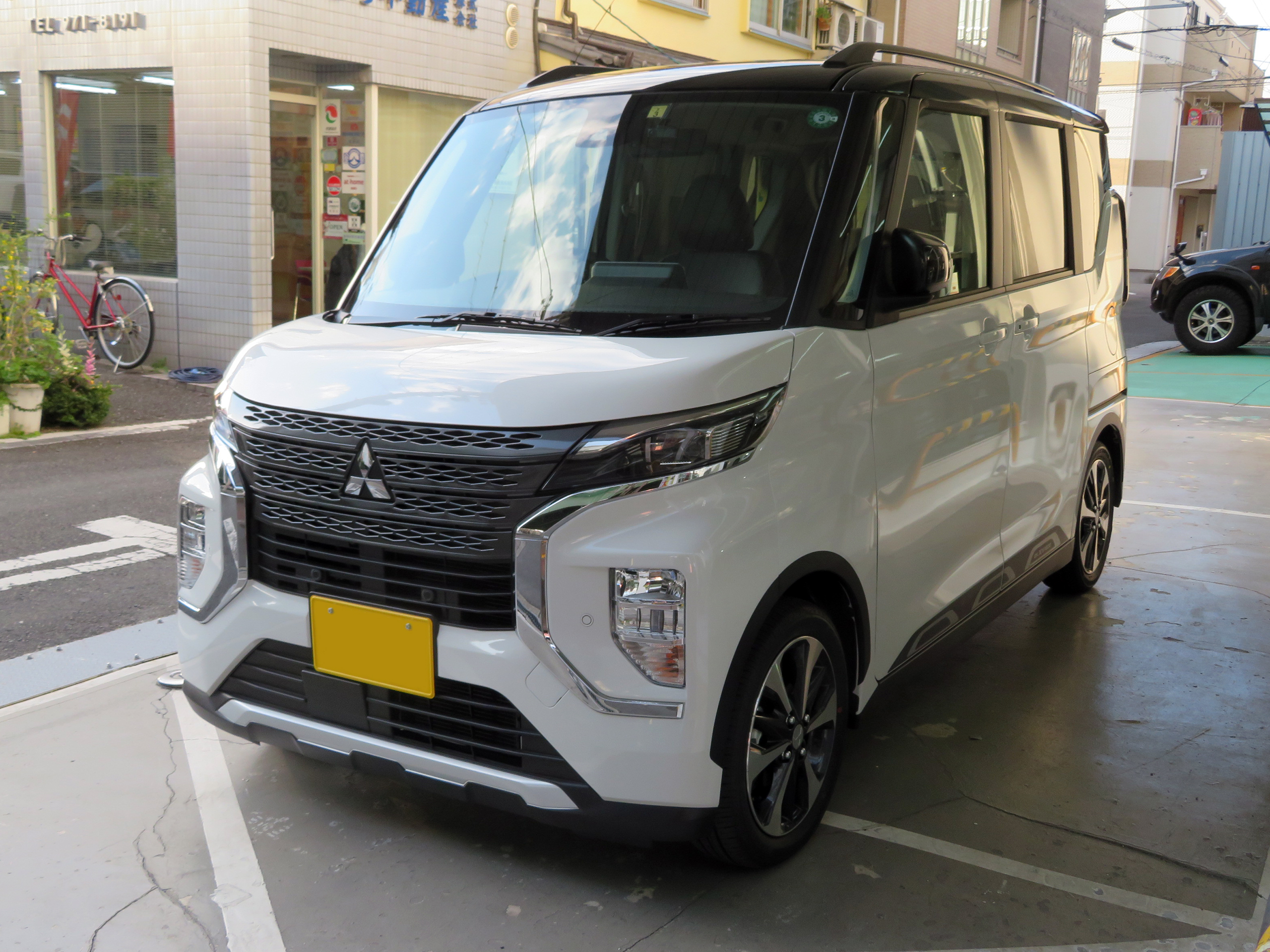
Mitsubishi eK X space

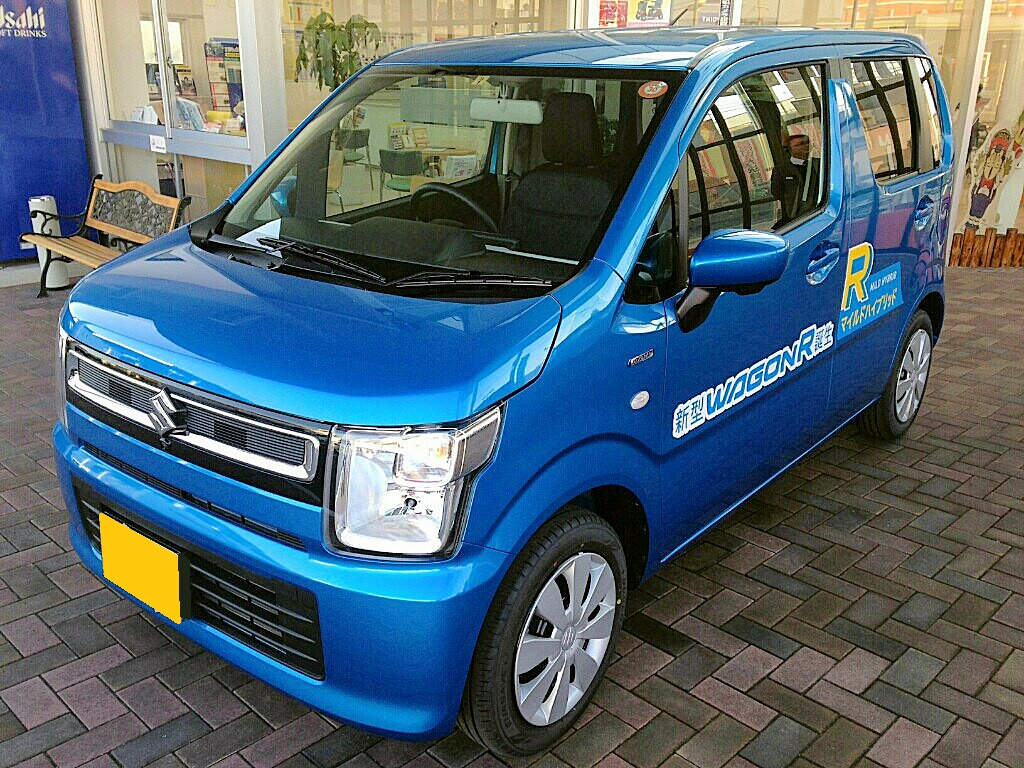
Suzuki Wagon R

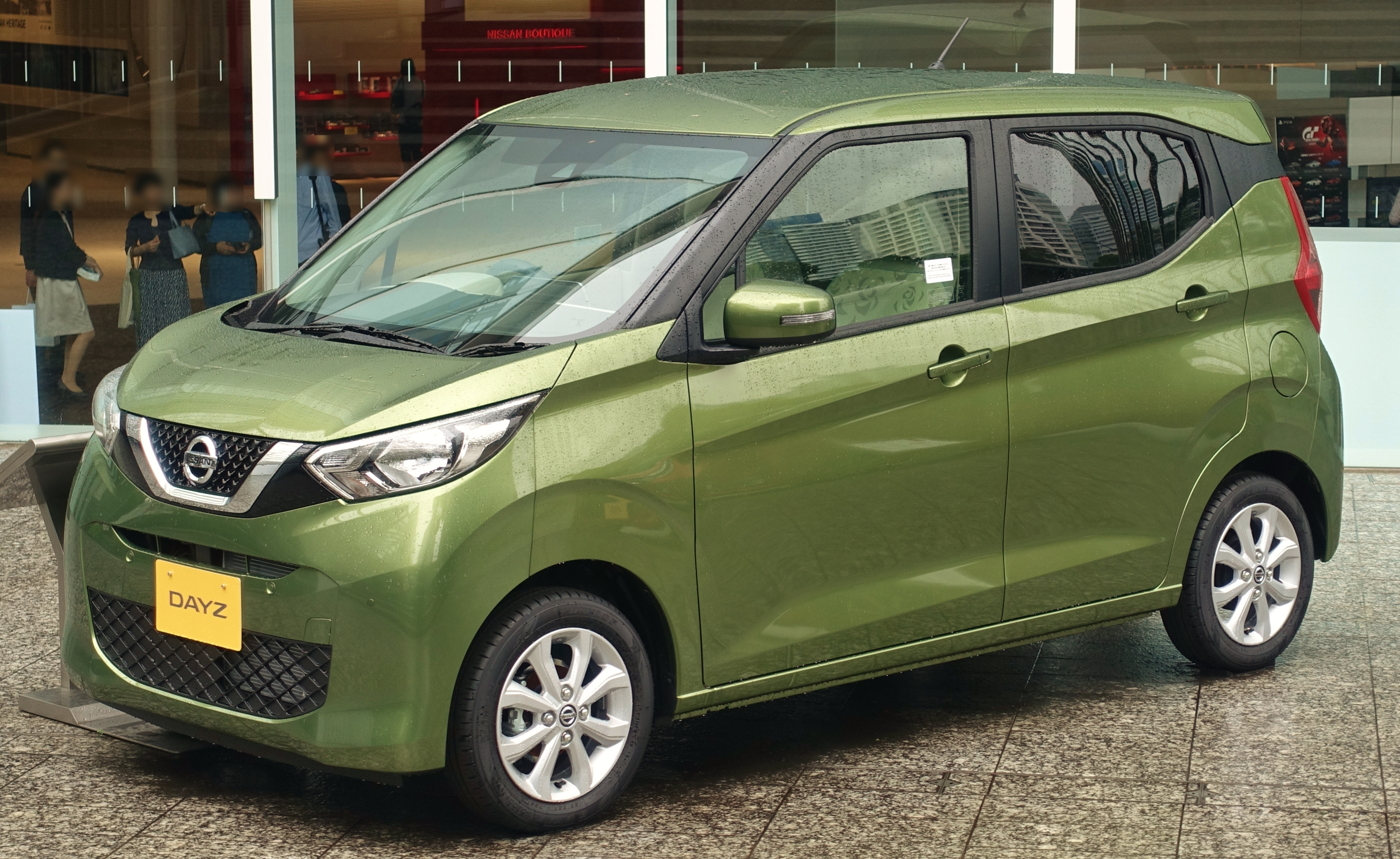
Nissan Dayz

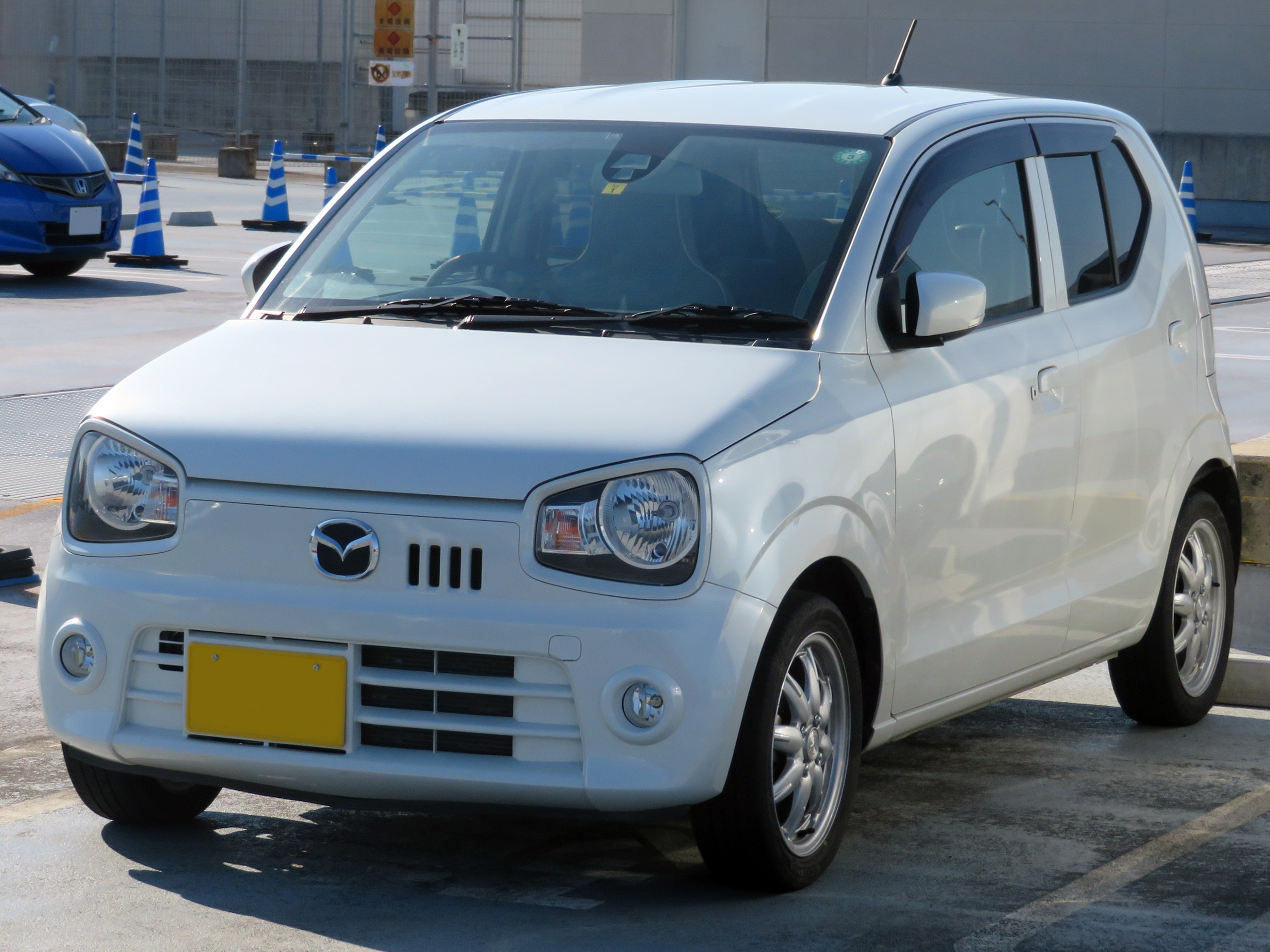
Mazda Carol

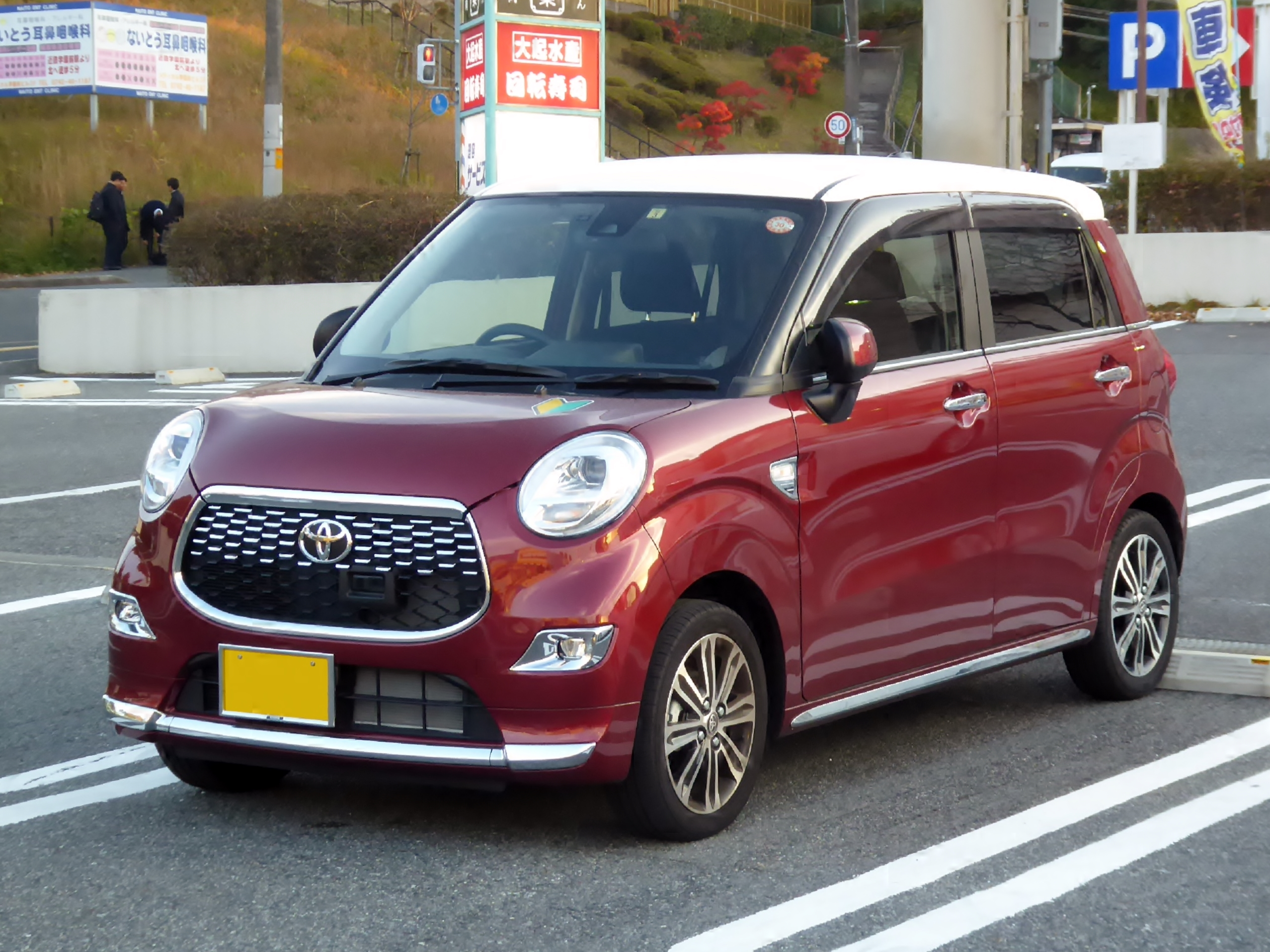
Toyota Pixis Joy

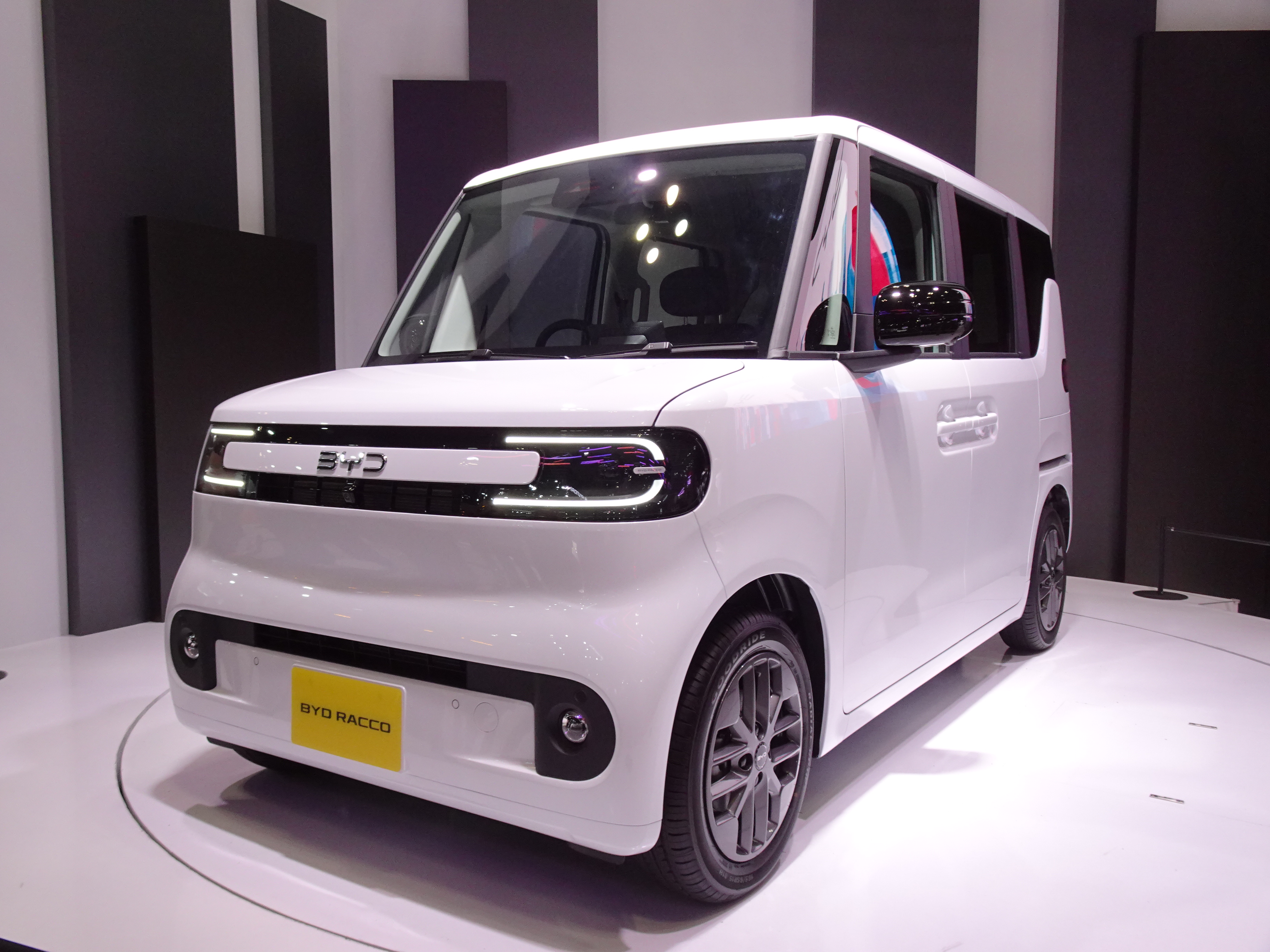
BYD Racco

== See also ==
- Kei truck
- Neighborhood electric vehicle
