= Lloyd LT 500 =

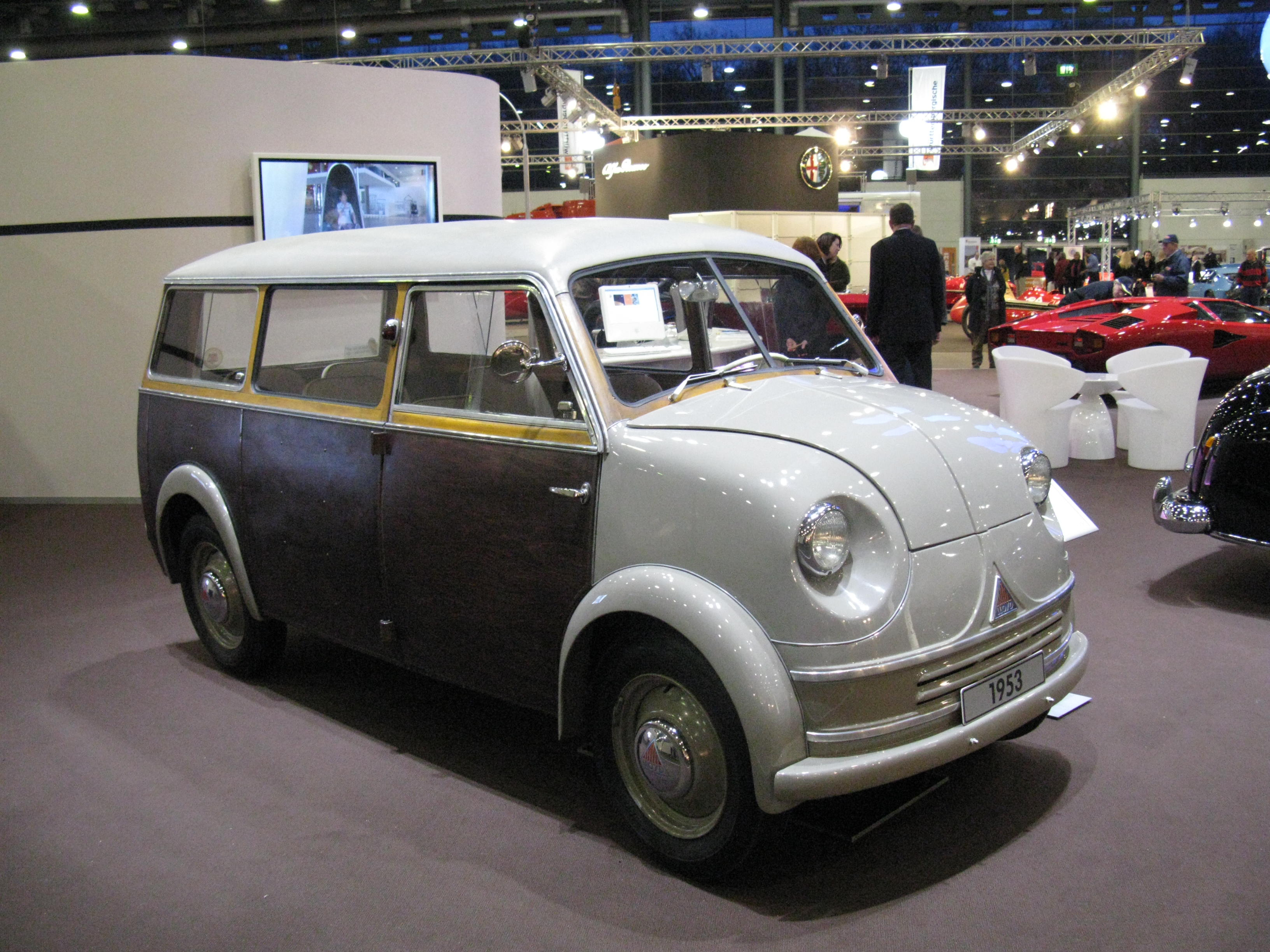

Overview
- Manufacturer: Hansa Lloyd and Goliath Company, Borgward & Tecklenborg
- Production: 1952–1955
- Assembly: West Germany: Bremen

Body and chassis
- Body style: Panel van, van, pickup style framed flatbed
- Layout: FF layout

Powertrain
- Engine: 386 cc 2-cylinder 2-stroke
- Transmission: 3-speed manual unsynchronized

Dimensions
- Wheelbase: 2,350 mm (92.5 in)
- Length: 3,530 mm (139.0 in)
- Width: 1,545 mm (60.8 in)
- Height: 1,620 mm (63.8 in)
- Curb weight: 635 kg (1,400 lb)…685 kg (1,510 lb) or 1,245 kg (2,745 lb)…1,265 kg (2,789 lb)

Chronology
- Successor: Lloyd LT 600

The Lloyd LT 500 is a compact van produced and sold by the German automaker Borgward Groups's Lloyd Motoren Werke GmbH (Lloyd Motor Works) in Bremen, Germany between 1953 and 1957. A six seater minivan version was offered by April 1954.

Its appearance resembles a van version of the Fiat 500, but that impression is misleading.

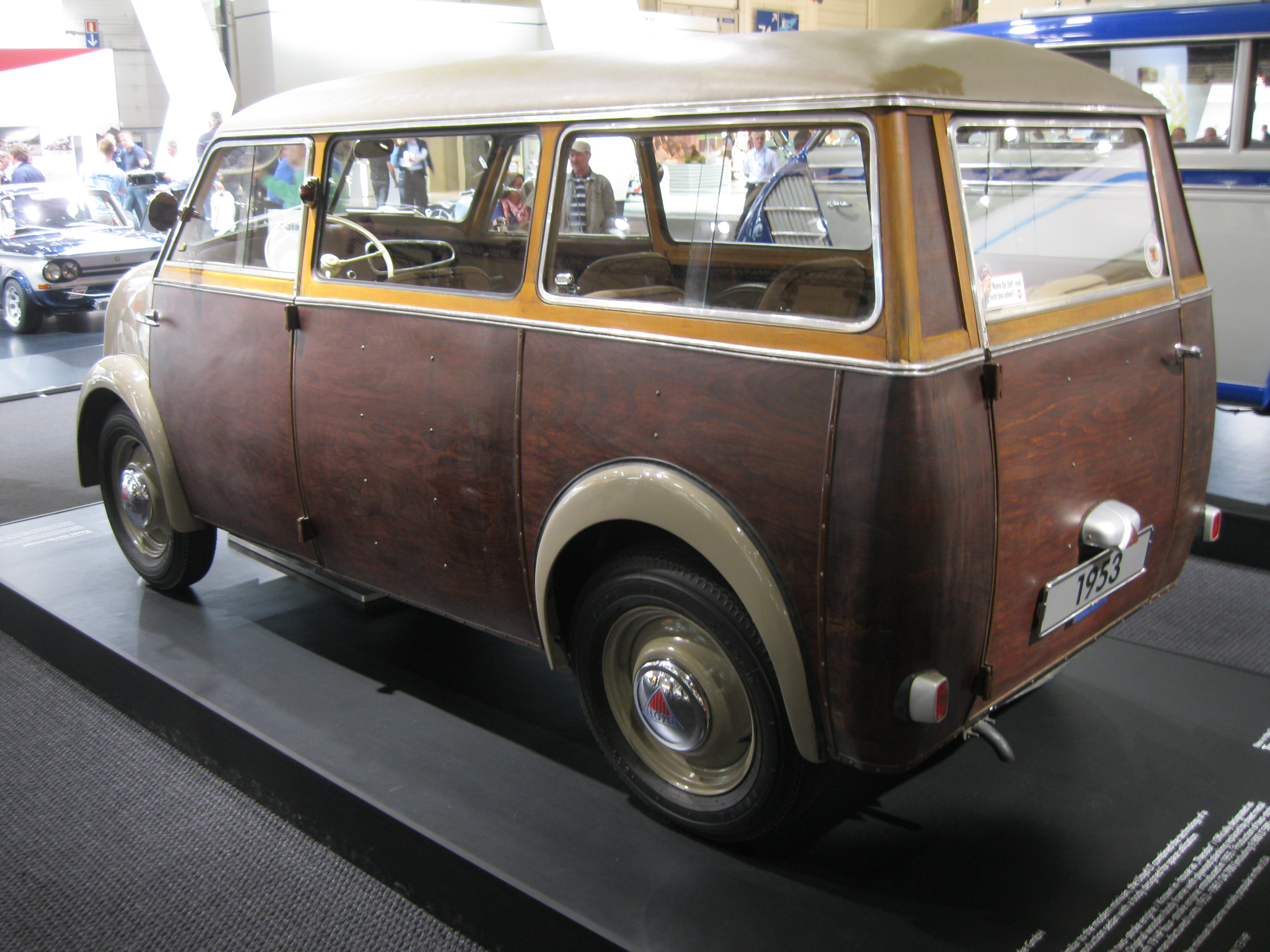
Lloyd LT 500 rear

The LT 500 featured a two cylinder two stroke engine of 386 cc, which claimed a power output of 13 hp. It had a 6V starter battery and electric. Its fuel consumption was specified to 5.7 l/100 km (41 mpg). A road test of the time recorded that fully loaded the six seater minivan had a weight to power ratio of 95 kg per unit of horse power, which accounted for a top speed of 60 km/h (37 mph), elsewhere a top speed - possibly for a less heavily loaded version - of 75 km/h (47 mph) has been quoted. The steering, springing and, in particular, the three-speed gear box without synchromesh on any ratio attracted criticism even by the standards of 1953. Interior comfort was also let down by insufficient heating and lack of ventilation possibilities also attracted criticism. The ease with which seats in the minivan could be removed to convert the vehicle to a load carrier impressed the journalists, however.

855 Pickups, 357 panel vans, and 8,688 minibus versions had been produced by the time the LT 500 was replaced by the 596 cc LT 600.

== LT 600 ==
Lloyd LT 600
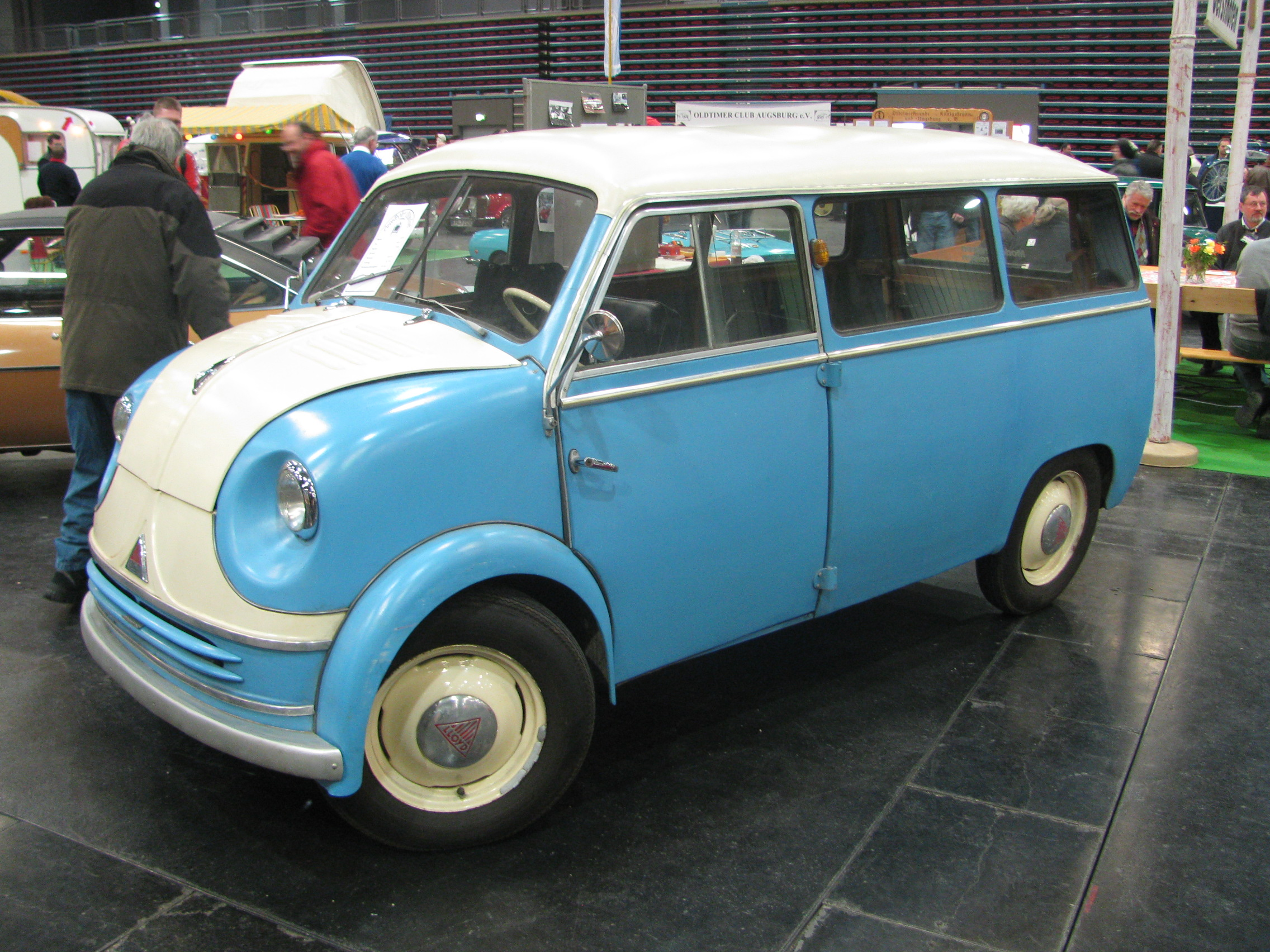

Overview
- Manufacturer: Hansa Lloyd and Goliath Company, Borgward & Tecklenborg
- Production: 1955–1961
- Assembly: West Germany: Bremen

Body and chassis
- Body style: Panel van, van, pickup style framed flatbed
- Layout: FF layout

Powertrain
- Engine: 596 cc 2 cylinder
- Transmission: 4-speed manual unsynchronized

Dimensions
- Wheelbase: 2,350 mm (92.5 in)…2,850 mm (112.2 in)
- Length: 3,550 mm (139.8 in)…4,050 mm (159.4 in)
- Width: 1,485 mm (58.5 in)
- Height: 1,630 mm (64.2 in)
- Curb weight: 1,170 kg (2,580 lb)…1,285 kg (2,833 lb) or 1,245 kg (2,745 lb)…1,265 kg (2,789 lb)

Chronology
- Predecessor: Lloyd LT 500

The Lloyd LT 600 was an engine upgraded Lloyd LT 500, which was built between 1955 and 1961. The slightly larger four stroke engine and the unsynchronized transmission were later used in the passenger car Lloyd 600 which was also a variation of the modell Alexander making the van take 6 l/100 km (39 mpg) of fuel consumption.

11,249 vans and 3519 other body variations have been produced until 1961, the year as Borgward disappeared with all its brands from the markets.

== See also ==
- DKW Schnellaster
- Tempo Matador
