= Lloyd 300 =

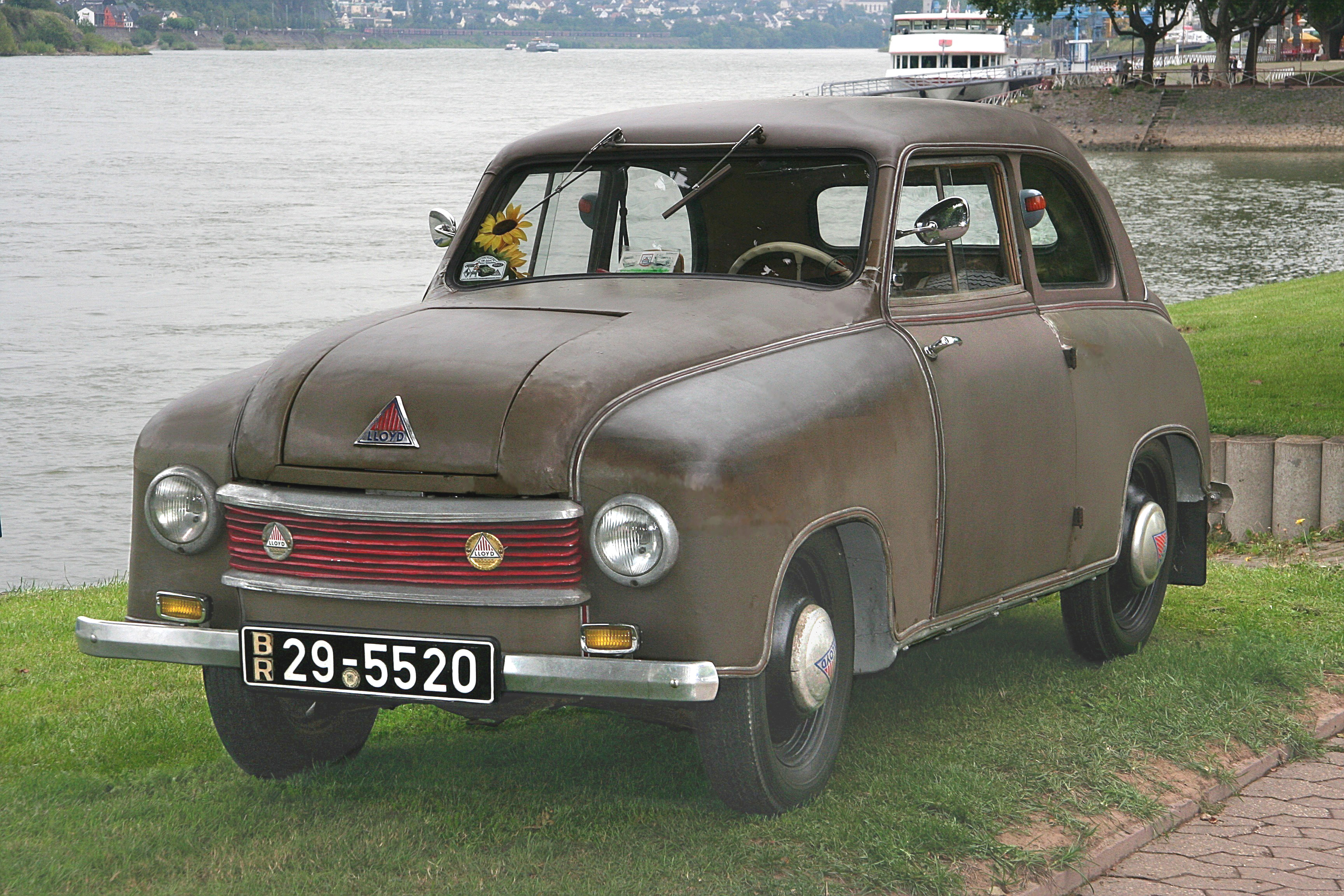
- Lloyd LP300

Overview
- Manufacturer: Carl F. W. Borgward GmbH
- Production: 1950–1952; 18,087 built
- Assembly: West Germany: Bremen

Body and chassis
- Body style: 2-door saloon coupé Kombi; Panel van
- Layout: FF layout
- Doors: Suicide doors

Powertrain
- Engine: 293 cc two-stroke 2-cylinder (parallel twin); 13 PS (HP): 9.6 kW

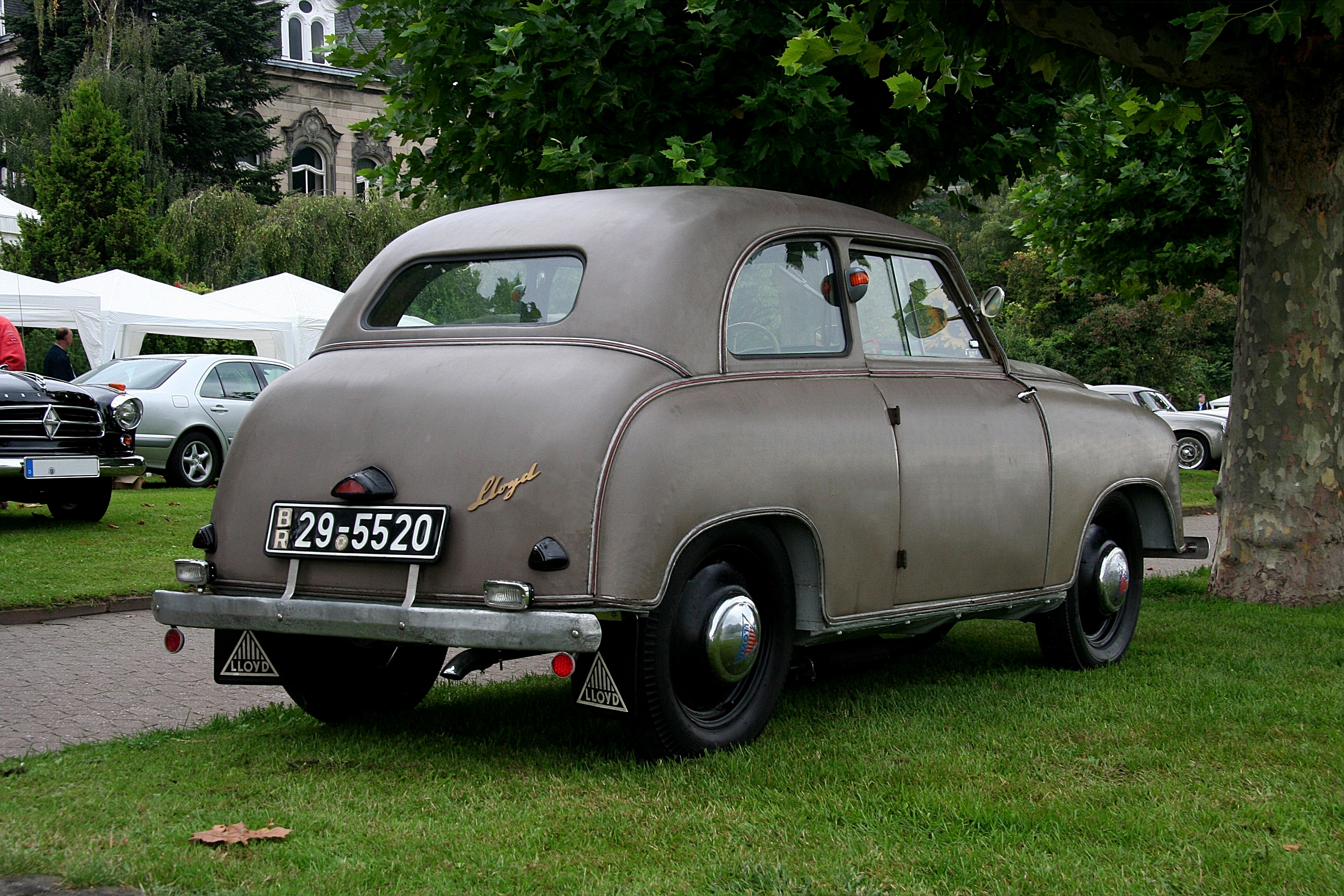
The windows in the rear-hinged doors slid open horizontally. The luggage locker had to be accessed from inside.

The Lloyd 300 was a small car produced by the Borgward Group's Lloyd Motoren Werke GmbH (Lloyd Motor Works) in Bremen between 1950 and 1952.

The full name of the Lloyd 300 featured a two letter prefix that identified the body shape. The Lloyd LP300 (saloon; some say "LP" signifies Limousine-Personenwagen, but others quote it as Lloyd Personenwagen which is more consistent with the names for the other bodystyles) was released in May 1950, while the LC300 (Lloyd Coupé) and LS300 (Lloyd Stationswagen / estate) followed early in 1951. There was also a panel van version, the LK (Lloyd Kastenwagen).

== Engine and running gear ==
Power was delivered to the front wheels from a transversely mounted air-cooled twin cylinder two-stroke engine with a horizontal-flow Solex 30 BFRH carburetor. The engine capacity of 293cc provided for a maximum power output of 10 PS (7.4 kW) at 4,000 rpm. The top speed listed was 75 km/h (47 mph). The car was fueled using "regular" grade petrol/gasoline, mixed in the ratio of 25:1 with oil, reflecting the requirements of the "motorbike-style" two-stroke engine. When driven normally the Lloyd 300 consumed fuel significantly more frugally than West Germany's best selling small car, the Volkswagen. Space was at a premium and the 18-litre fuel tank was accommodated ahead of the bulkhead underneath the front hood/bonnet in a space shared with the engine and the six-volt battery. Power was fed to the front wheels via a three-speed manual gear box (without synchromesh).

Borgward had contracted out the development of the engine and transmission package to a firm called "INKA" (Ingenieurs- und Konstruktionsarbeitsgemeinschaft) in Hude. The INKA engineers had previously been employed by Auto Union, the Zwickau based conglomerate that had produced a succession of technically innovative and commercially successful DKW branded small cars during the 1930s, and the similarities between the basic architecture and technical solutions employed by the Lloyd 300 and those of the prewar DKW F8 was impossible to miss. From the driver's seat, it was clear that no attempt had been made to conceal the way that details such as the gear lever and dashboard layout had been modelled on earlier DKW designs.

== Steering, suspension and brakes ==
The steering employed a rack and pinion mechanism which was conventional at the time. It required 2¼ turns between opposite locks: the turning circle was 11 m (36 ft). The front wheels were suspended independently by two laterally mounted leaf springs. At the back there was a swing axle with semi-elliptical longitudinally configured leaf springs. From January 1952 it was possible to order the Lloyd 300 with shock absorbers, for a supplement of DM 70.

The brakes were applied with a cable linkage. The mechanical handbrake worked on all four wheels.

== Chassis and body ==
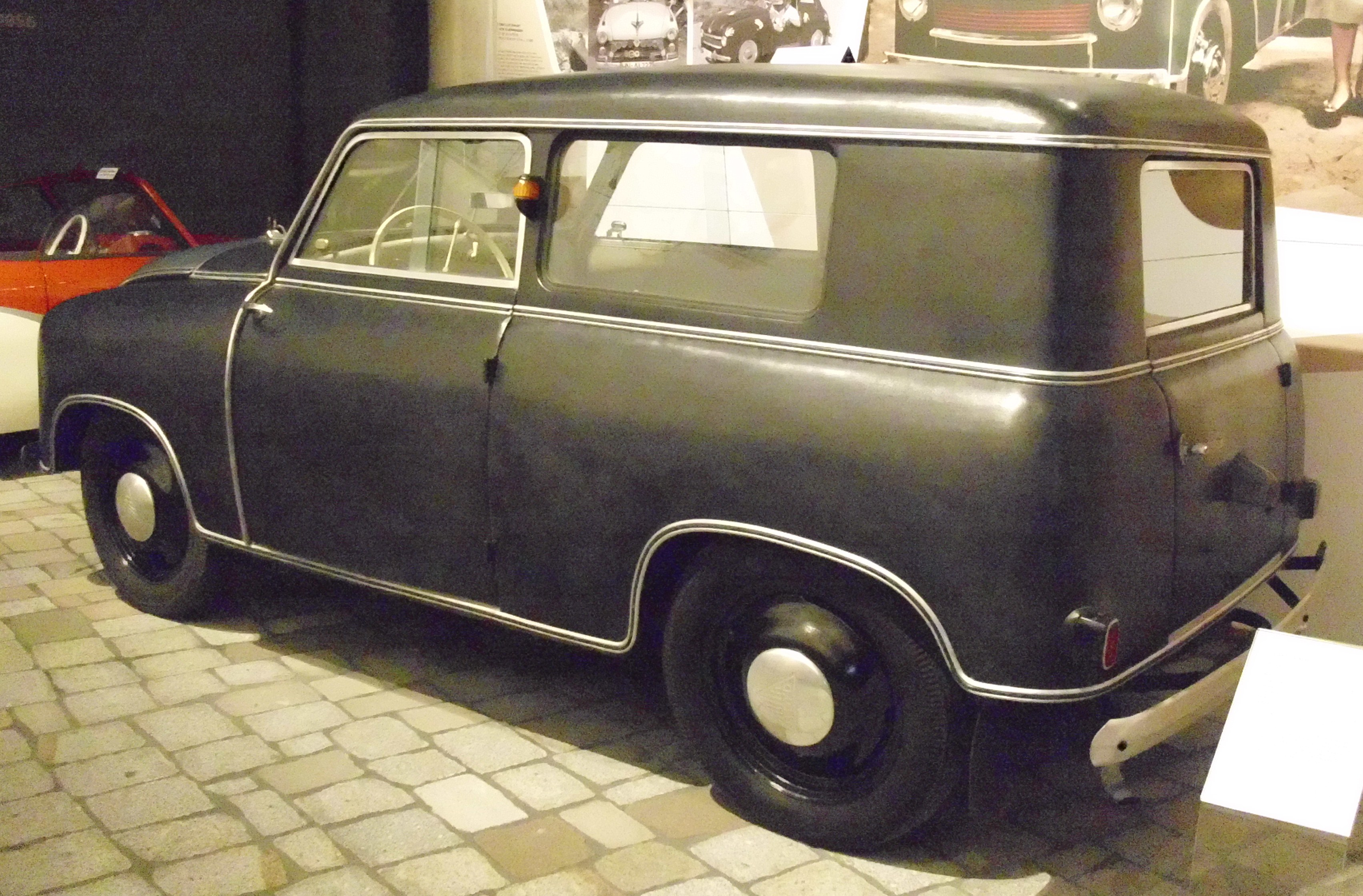
Lloyd LS 300 (Stationswagen)

The compact four-seater body was mounted on a tubular steel chassis with cross members and a platform of sheet steel. It consisted of a timber and plywood frame with an outer skin of synthetic leather. This avoided the need to use steel body panels which would have necessitated investment in heavy presses and complex dies with a high capital cost, and it reflected the acute steel shortage across western Europe at the time. According to one source the synthetic leather skin sometimes concealed a multitude of imperfections in the construction of the timber frame. Timber frame construction, which built on skills developed in nineteenth century carriage manufacturing, had been common in the 1920s, and manufacturers of small inexpensive cars not wishing to invest in costly presses and dies for stamping out steel body panels, notably DKW, had persisted with the technique and refined it through the 1930s. By the 1950s, however, some thought it anachronistic and the Lloyd 300 quickly acquired the soubriquet "Leukoplastbomber", an essentially untranslatable term referring to its "cute" shape and the "plasticky" character of the car's synthetic leather skin. Leukoplast is a brand of surgical tape; it was commonly used for quick repairs before duct tape became available and was allegedly suitable to repair the Lloyd 300.

The doors were hinged on the rear edge which facilitated access and egress. The windows in the doors slid open horizontally which avoided the need for costly and bulky winder mechanisms in the doors of what was, even by the standards of the time, a narrow car. The hood/bonnet lid was considered very narrow, and was broadened at the end of 1951. There was no opening hatch for the luggage locker at the back of the car, which instead had to be accessed by reaching behind the back seat.

== Commercial ==
By the end of 1952, when the Lloyd 300 made way for the Lloyd 400, 18,087 of the earlier cars had been produced. Production peaked in 1952 with 9,981 Lloyds produced. Nevertheless, by this time the West German small car market was dominated by Volkswagen who in 1952 produced 114,348 Volkswagen "Beetles".

When it was launched, in May 1950, the Lloyd came with an advertised price of DM 3,334, which was very much less than the DM 4,600 advertised price for a Beetle. Both cars were small, cramped and slow, but for most purposes the Lloyd 300 was a class smaller than the Beetle. Nevertheless, by 1952 the price for a Beetle had come down to DM 4,400 while the price of a Lloyd 300 was increased to DM 3,664 in February 1952. The Lloyd 300 was replaced at the start of 1953 by the broadly similar Lloyd 400, itself replaced by the more powerful but otherwise broadly similar Lloyd 600 in 1955. As the 1950 progressed the economies of scale available to Volkswagen from their higher production volumes enabled the company to reduce the price of the Beetle further, and the price differential between the little Lloyds and the Volkswagen eroded further year by year.
