= Compact car =

Cars that are larger than a subcompact car but smaller than a mid-size car

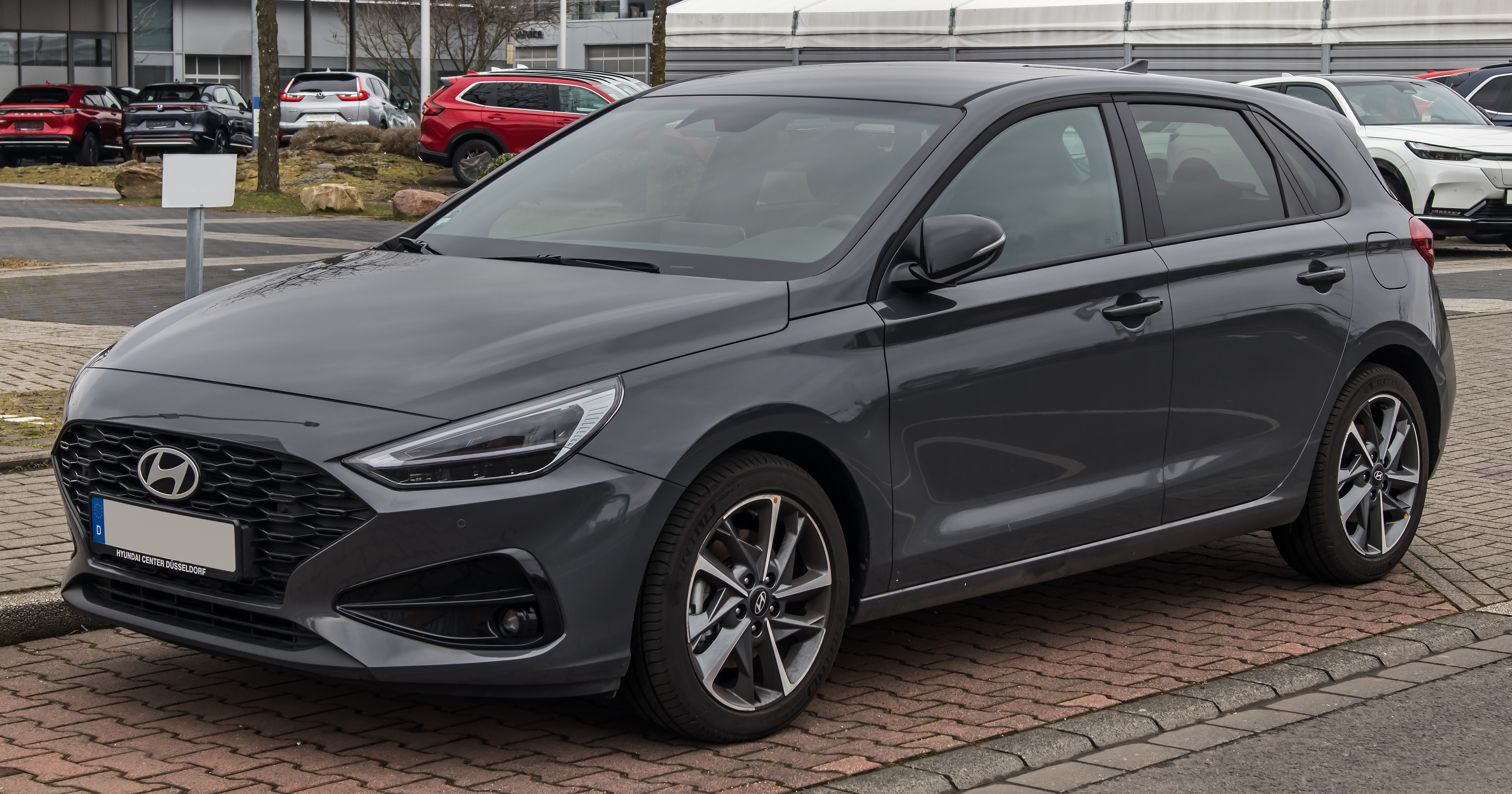
Hyundai i30
(2006–present)

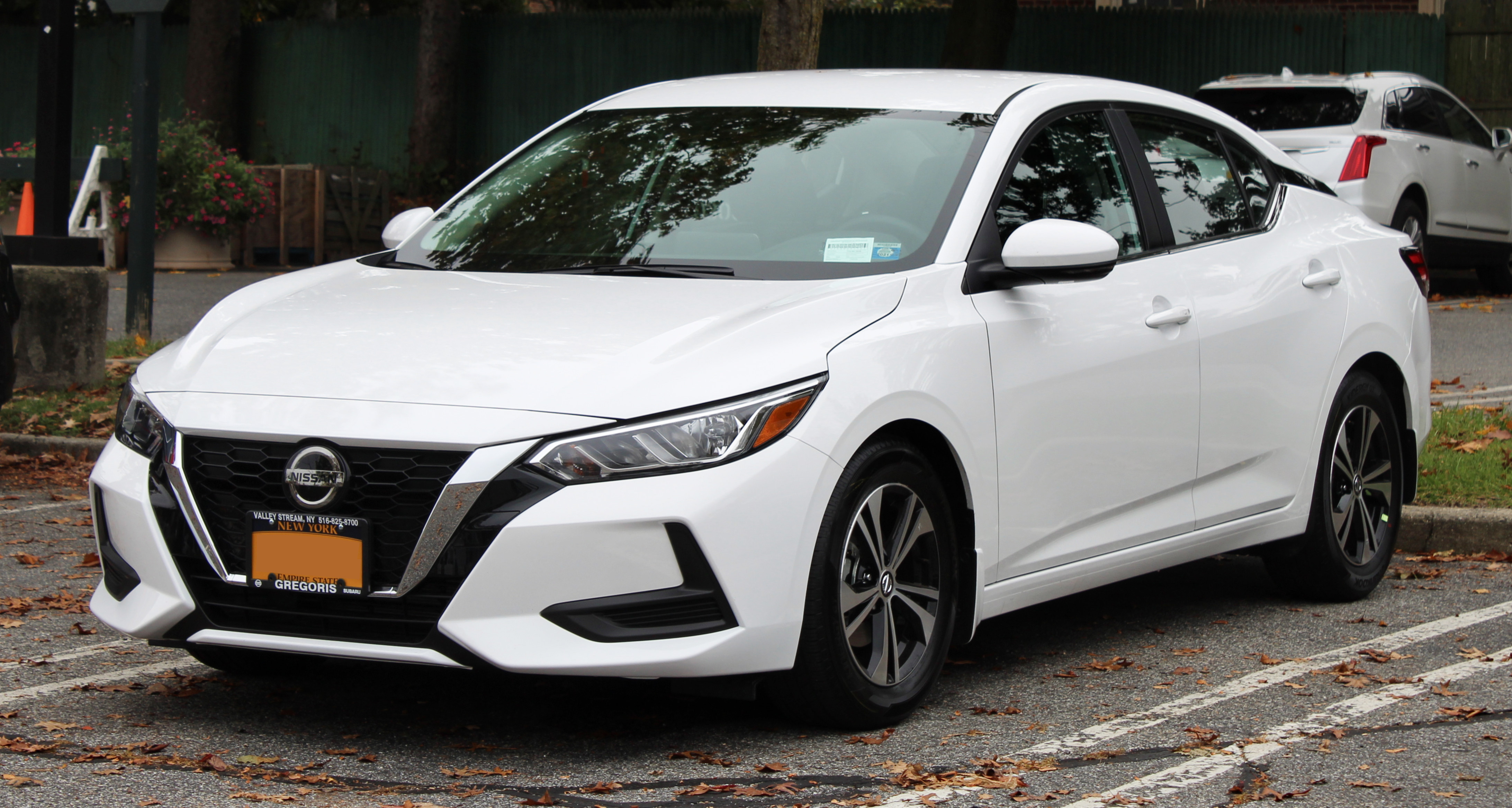
Nissan Sentra
(1990–present)

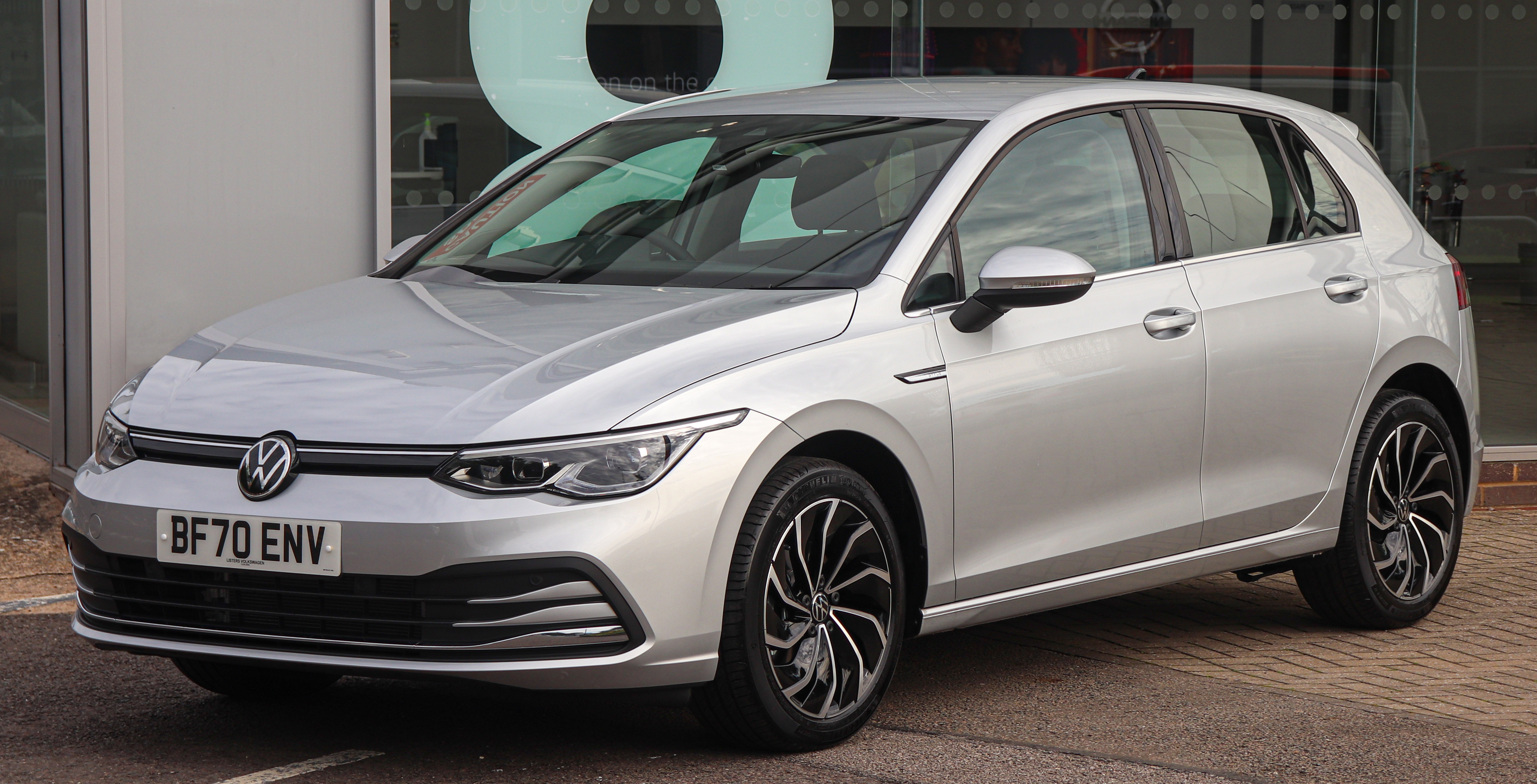
Volkswagen Golf
(1974–present)

Compact car is a vehicle size class—predominantly used in North America—that sits between subcompact cars and mid-size cars. "Small family car" is a British term and a part of the C-segment in the European car classification. However, before the downsizing of the United States car industry in the 1970s and 1980s, larger vehicles with wheelbases up to 110 in (2.79 m) were considered "compact cars" in the United States.

== United States ==
=== Current definition ===
The United States Environmental Protection Agency (EPA) Fuel Economy Regulations for 1977 and Later Model Year (dated July 1996) includes definitions for classes of automobiles. Based on the combined passenger and cargo volume, compact cars are defined as having an interior volume index of 100–109 cu ft (2.8–3.1 m^{3}).

=== 1930s to 1950s ===
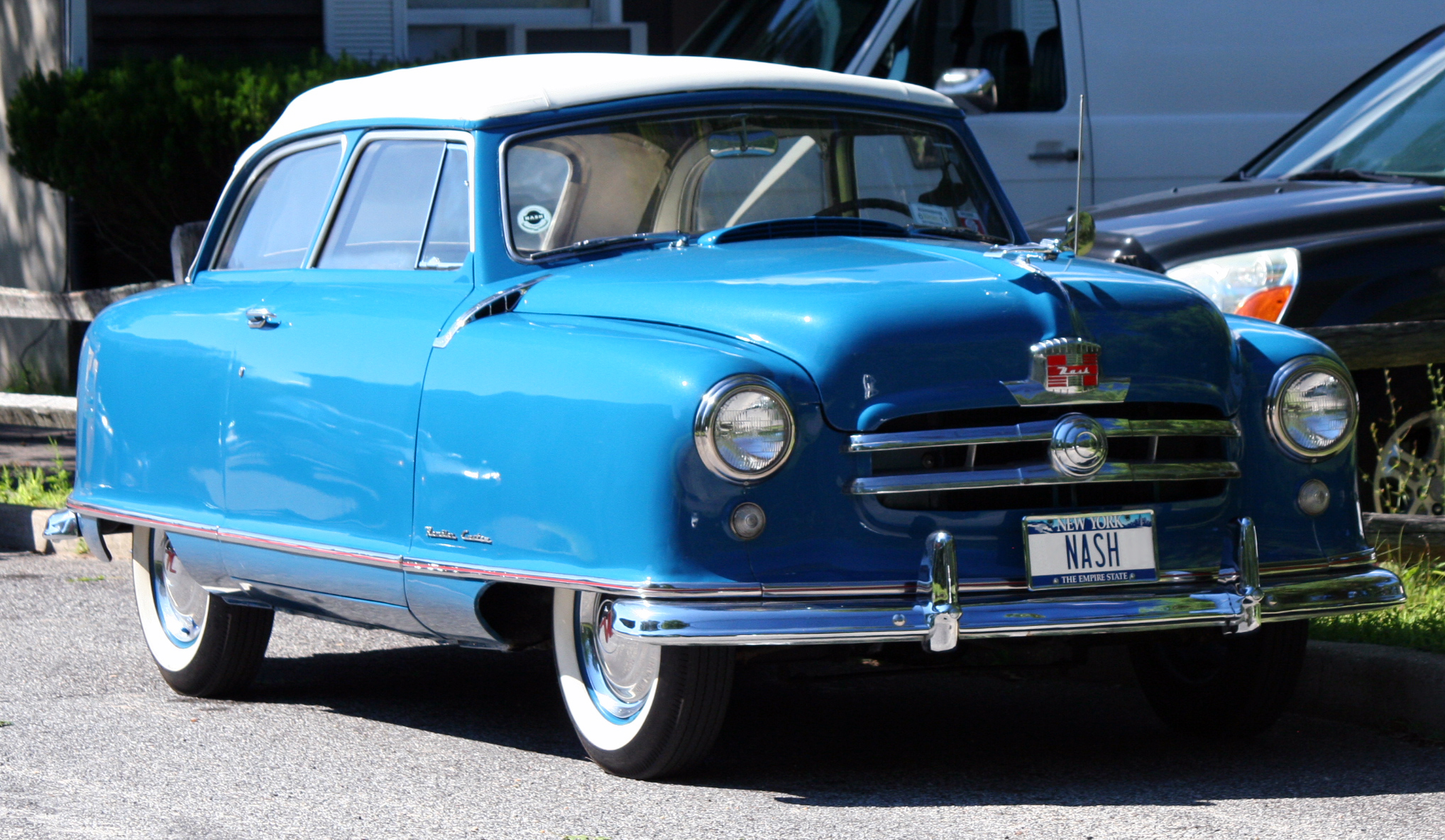
1952 Nash Rambler 2-door station wagon used until 1955, began 1950

The beginnings of U.S. production of compact cars were the late 1940s prototypes of economy cars, including the Chevrolet Cadet and the Ford Light Car. Neither car reached production in the U.S., however Ford SAF in France bought the plans of the "small Ford" and produced the Ford Vedette.

The first U.S.-produced postwar compact car was the 1950 Nash Rambler. It was built on a 100-inch (2,540 mm) wheelbase, which was nonetheless still a large car by contemporary European standards. The term "compact" was coined by a Nash executive as a euphemism for small cars with a wheelbase of 110 inches (2,794 mm) or less. It established a new market segment and the U.S. automobile industry soon adopted the "compact" term.

Several competitors to the Nash Rambler arose from the ranks of America's other independent automakers, although none enjoyed the long-term success of the Rambler. Other early compact cars included the Kaiser-Frazer Henry J (also re-badged as the Allstate), the Willys Aero and the Hudson Jet.

In 1954, 64,500 cars sold in the U.S. were imports or small American cars, out of a total market of five million cars. Market research indicated that five percent of those surveyed said they would consider a small car, suggesting a potential market size of 275,000 cars. By 1955, the Nash Rambler that began as a convertible model became a success and was now available in station wagon, hardtop, and sedan body styles. During the Recession of 1958, the only exception to the sales decline was American Motors with its compact, economy-oriented Ramblers that saw high demand among cautious consumers.

By 1959, sales of small imported cars also increased to 14% of the U.S. passenger car market, as consumers turned to compact cars. By this time, smaller cars appealed to people with a college education and a higher income whose families were buying more than one car. Customers expected compact cars to provide improved fuel economy compared to full-sized cars while maintaining headroom, legroom, and plenty of trunk space.

Between 1958 and 1960, the major U.S. car manufacturers made a push toward compact cars, resulting in the introduction of the Studebaker Lark, Chevrolet Corvair, Ford Falcon, and Plymouth Valiant. These models also gave rise to compact vans built on the compact car platforms, such as the Studebaker Zip Van, Chevrolet Corvair Greenbrier, Ford Econoline, and Dodge A100.

=== 1960s ===
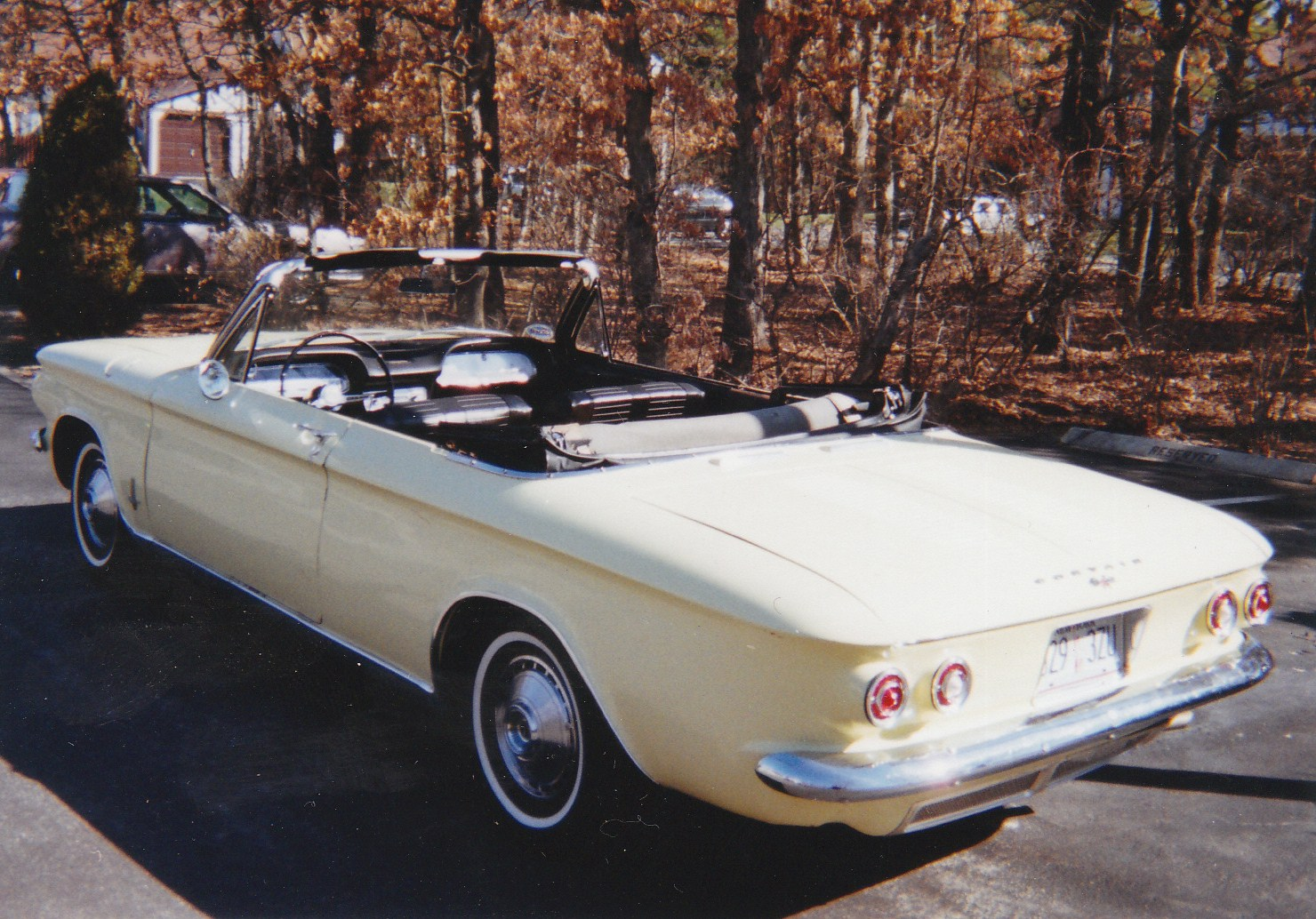
1964 Chevrolet Corvair Monza 900 convertible, used until 1969, began 1960

During the 1960s, compacts were the smallest class of North American cars, but they had evolved into only slightly smaller versions of the 6-cylinder or V8-powered six-passenger sedan. They were much larger than compacts (and sometimes even mid-sizers) by European manufacturers, which were typically five-passenger four-cylinder engine cars. Nevertheless, advertising and road tests for the Ford Maverick and the Rambler American made comparisons with the popular Volkswagen Beetle.

Compact cars were also the basis for a new small car segment that became known as the pony car, named after the Ford Mustang, which was built on the Falcon chassis. At that time, there was a distinct difference in size between compact and full-size models. Early definitions of vehicle size class were based on wheelbase, with models under 111 inches as compact, 111 to 118 inches intermediate, and over 118 inches as full size, at least until EPA classes based on interior volume of the passenger and cargo compartments were introduced in the late 1970s.

=== 1970s ===
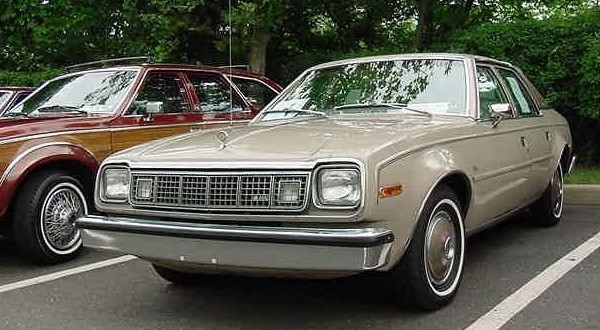
AMC Concord (1977–1983) luxury compact

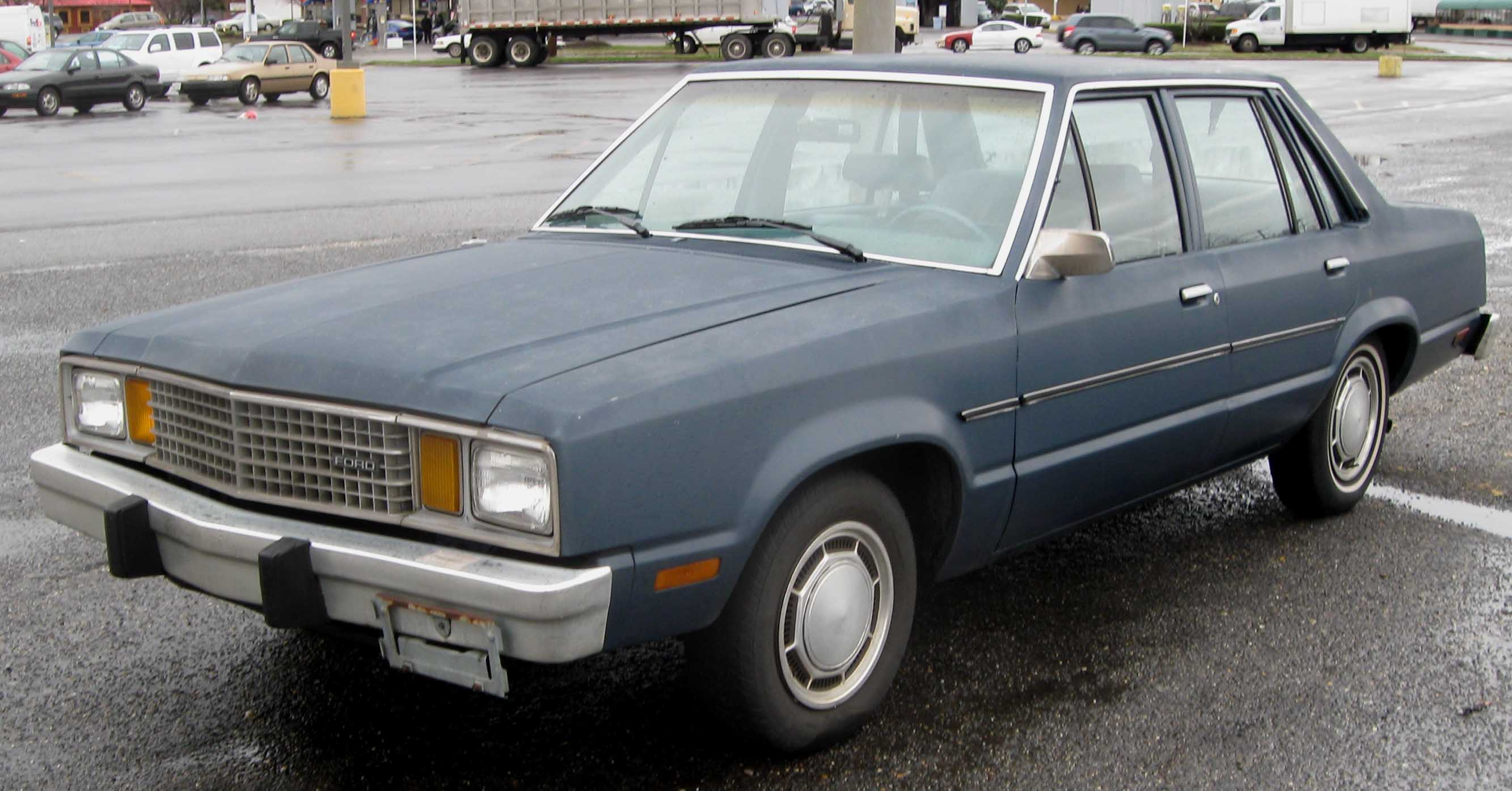
Ford Fairmont (1977–1983)

In the early 1970s, the domestic automakers introduced even smaller subcompact cars that included the AMC Gremlin, Chevrolet Vega, and Ford Pinto.

In 1973, the Energy Crisis started, which made small fuel-efficient cars more desirable, and the North American driver began exchanging their large cars for the smaller, imported compacts that cost less to fill up and were inexpensive to maintain.

The 1977 model year marked the beginning of a downsizing of all vehicles so that cars such as the AMC Concord and the Ford Fairmont that replaced the compacts were re-classified as mid-size, while cars inheriting the size of the Ford Pinto and Chevrolet Vega (such as the Ford Escort and Chevrolet Cavalier) became classified as compact cars. Even after the reclassification, mid-size American cars were still far larger than mid-size cars from other countries and were more similar in size to cars classified as "large cars" in Europe. It would not be until the 1980s that American cars were being downsized to truly international dimensions.

=== 1980s to present ===
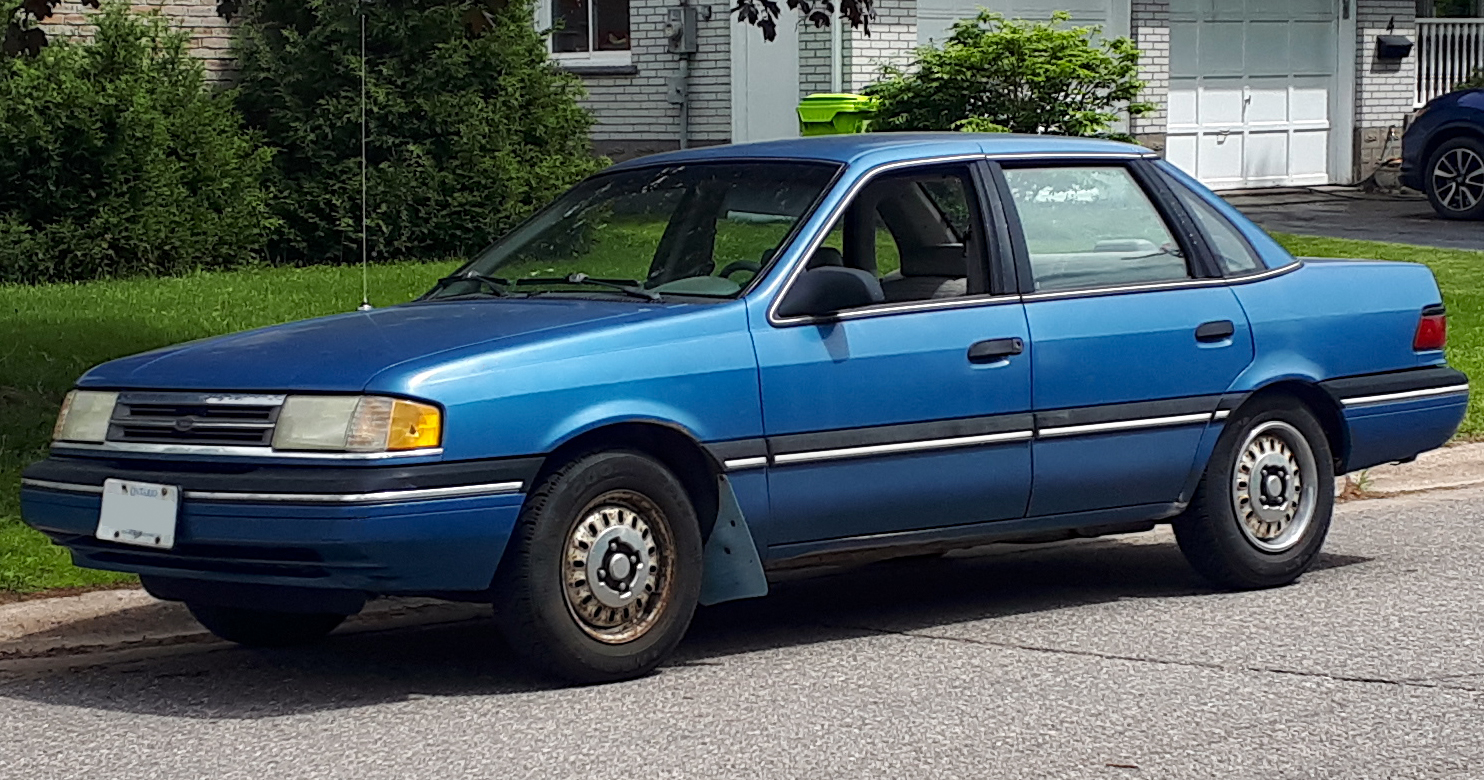
Ford Tempo (1988–1991)

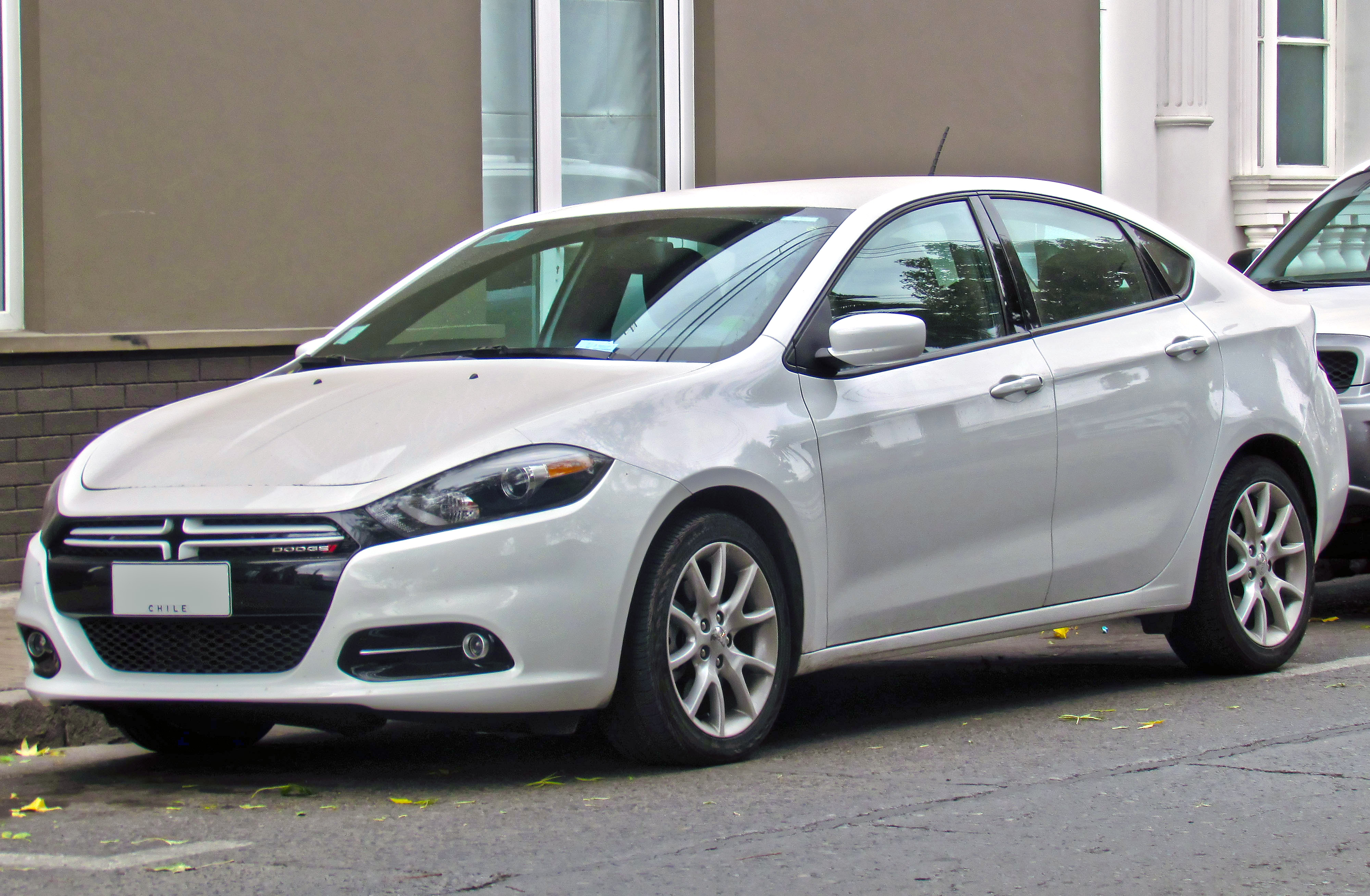
Dodge Dart (2013–2016)

In the 1985 model year, compact cars classified by the EPA included Ford's Escort and Tempo as well as the Chevrolet Cavalier. For the 2019 model year, the best sellers were the Toyota Corolla and Honda Civic. Since the 2000s, compact cars have grown larger, with cars such as the Honda Civic and Hyundai Elantra being classified as "midsize" in 2024. In addition, compact SUVs have begun to replace compact cars, with the market share of sedans and wagons halving from 2000 to 2025.

== Japan ==
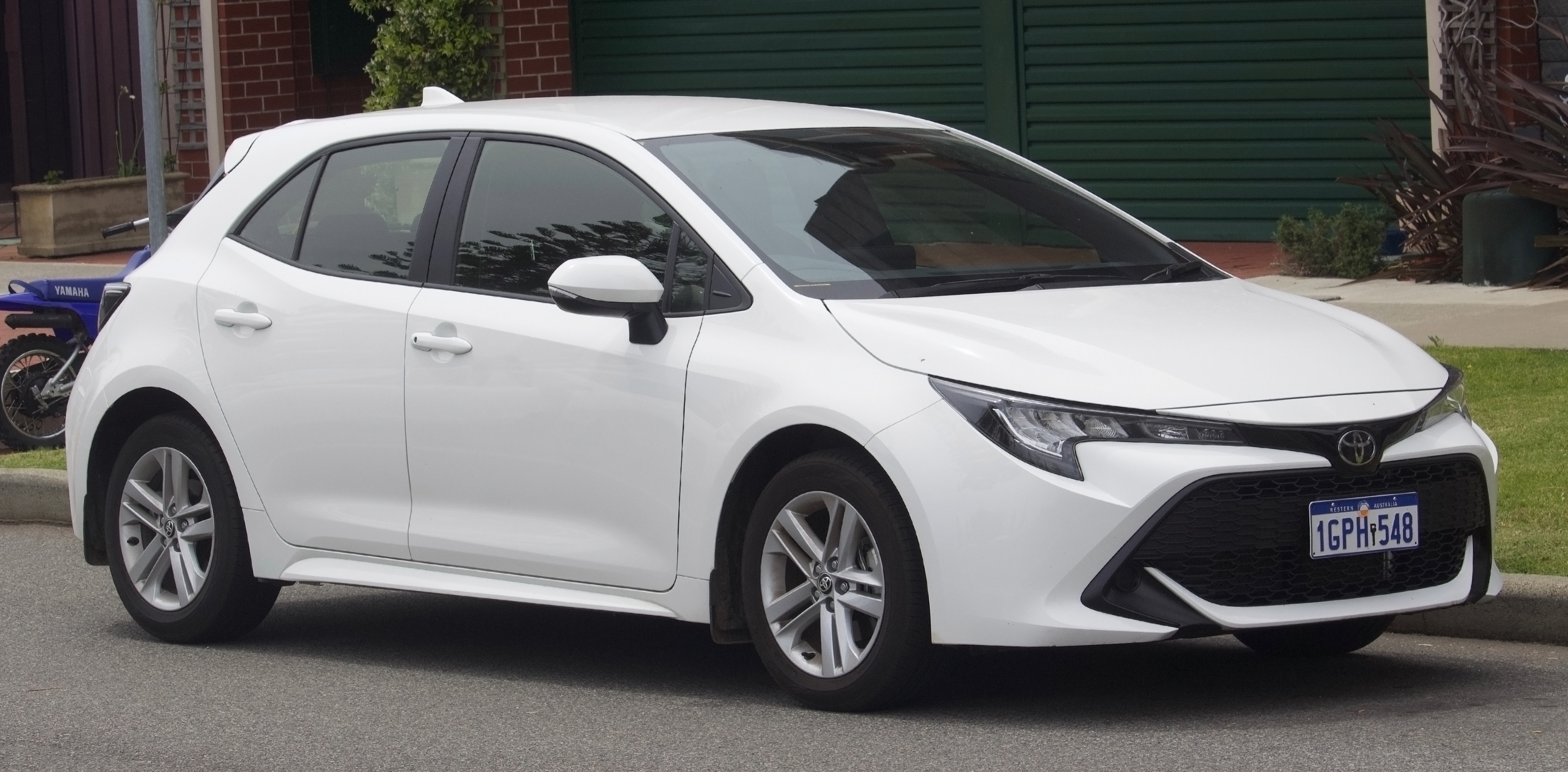
1966–present Toyota Corolla

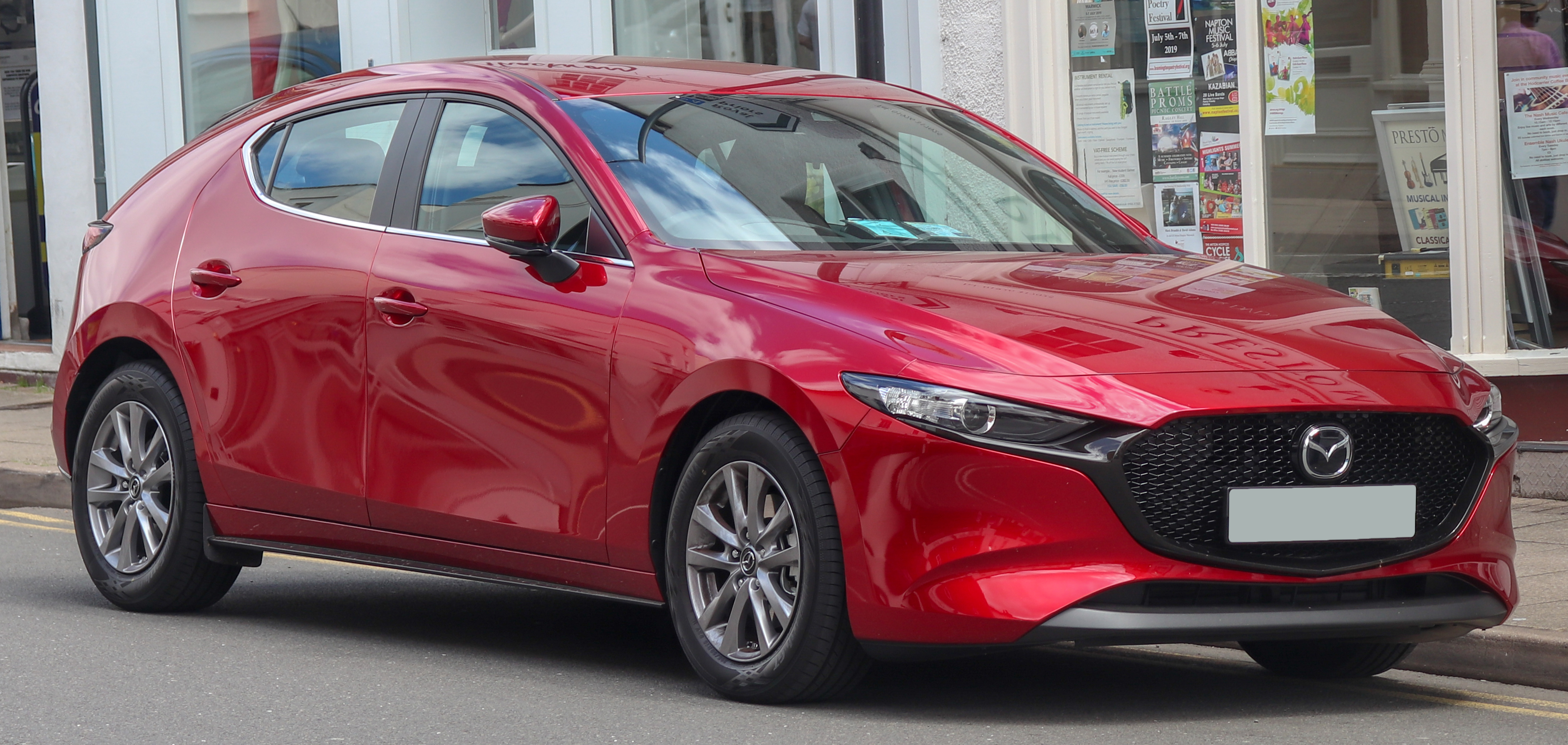
2003–present Mazda3

In Japan, small size passenger vehicle is a registration category that sits between kei cars and regular cars, based on overall size and engine displacement limits.

=== Definition ===
In Japan, vehicles that are larger than kei cars, but with dimensions smaller than 4,700 mm (185.0 in) long, 1,700 mm (66.9 in) wide, 2,000 mm (78.7 in) high and with engines at or under 2,000 cc (120 cu in) are classified as "small size" cars.

Small-size cars are identified by a license plate number beginning with "5". In the past, the small size category has received tax benefits stipulated by the Japanese government regulations, such as those in the 1951 Road Vehicle Act.

=== 1950s and 1960s ===
In 1955, the Japanese Ministry of International Trade and Industry set forth a goal to all Japanese makers at that time to create what was called a "national car". The concept stipulated that the vehicle be able to maintain a maximum speed over 100 km/h (62 mph), weigh below 400 kg (882 lbs), fuel consumption at 30 km/L (85 mpg_{‑imp}; 71 mpg_{‑US}) or more, at an average speed of 60 km/h (37 mph) on a level road, and not require maintenance or significant service for at least 100,000 km (62,000 mi). This established a "compact car" target that was larger than what has become known as the "light car" or the kei car.

One of the first compact cars that met those requirements was the Toyota Publica with an air-cooled two-cylinder opposed engine, the Datsun 110 series, and the Mitsubishi 500. The Publica and the Mitsubishi 500 were essentially "kei cars" with engines larger than regulations permitted at the time, while the Datsun was an all-new vehicle. These vehicles were followed by the Hino Contessa in 1961, the Isuzu Bellett, Daihatsu Compagno and Mazda Familia in 1963, the Mitsubishi Colt in 1965, and the Nissan Sunny, Subaru 1000, and Toyota Corolla in 1966. Honda introduced its first four-door sedan in 1969, called the Honda 1300. In North America, these cars were classified as subcompact cars.

=== 1970s to present ===
By 1970, Nissan released its first front-wheel-drive car which was originally developed by Prince Motor Company which had merged with Nissan in 1966. This was introduced in 1970 as the Nissan Cherry. In 1972, the Honda Civic appeared with the CVCC engine that was able to meet California emission standards without the use of a catalytic converter.

== See also ==
- Vehicle size class
- Compact MPV
- Compact sport utility vehicle
- Economy car
- Hot hatch
- Minivan
- Sport compact
- Supermini car
- Compact executive car
