= Lloyd (automobile) =

German automobile company (1908–1963)

Lloyd Motoren Werke G.m.b.H.
- Industry: Automotive
- Founded: 1908
- Defunct: 1963
- Fate: Bankruptcy
- Headquarters: Bremen, Germany
- Products: Automobiles
- Parent: Norddeutscher Lloyd

Lloyd Motoren Werke G.m.b.H. (Lloyd Engine Works) was a German automobile manufacturer, created in 1908 and owned by the Norddeutscher Lloyd shipping company. The factory was in Bremen. The company operated under a variety of different names throughout the decades, but their products were nearly always badged with the Lloyd marque. Originally a manufacturer of luxury cars, the company was folded into the Borgward Group in 1929, with the brand not used on passenger cars again until 1950. Production ended for good in 1963, although a successor company continued trading until 1989, selling replacement parts, as well as manufacturing engines for snowmobiles and boats.

The German Lloyd marque had no connection with the British Lloyd Cars Ltd company active between 1936 and 1951.

== 1908–1937 ==
The first cars were licence-built Kriéger electric vehicles. Petrol-engined models followed in 1908, using 3685 cc engines, but few were made. The Belgian electrical engineer, Paul Mossay, was employed for four years as chief engineer, designing both engines and electric vehicles. In 1914, the company merged with Hansa to become Hansa-Lloyd Werke AG. The company was never on a sound financial footing and changed names and badging on a number of occasions. Most of the Hansa/Lloyd cars made during that period were branded as "Hansa". The "Hansa-Lloyd" name mainly attached to commercial vehicles, with the exception of the Treff-Aß and the Trumpf-Aß. The company was integrated in the Borgward group after the purchase of Hansa by Carl F. W. Borgward in 1929, and car production ceased.

Until 1937, the Hansa-Lloyd brand was used on a number of commercial vehicles (trucks and buses), from the one-ton "Express" to the five-ton "Merkur". They were largely replaced by Borgward-branded vehicles, but a few models were sold in 1938 with just "Hansa" badging.

== 1950–1963 ==
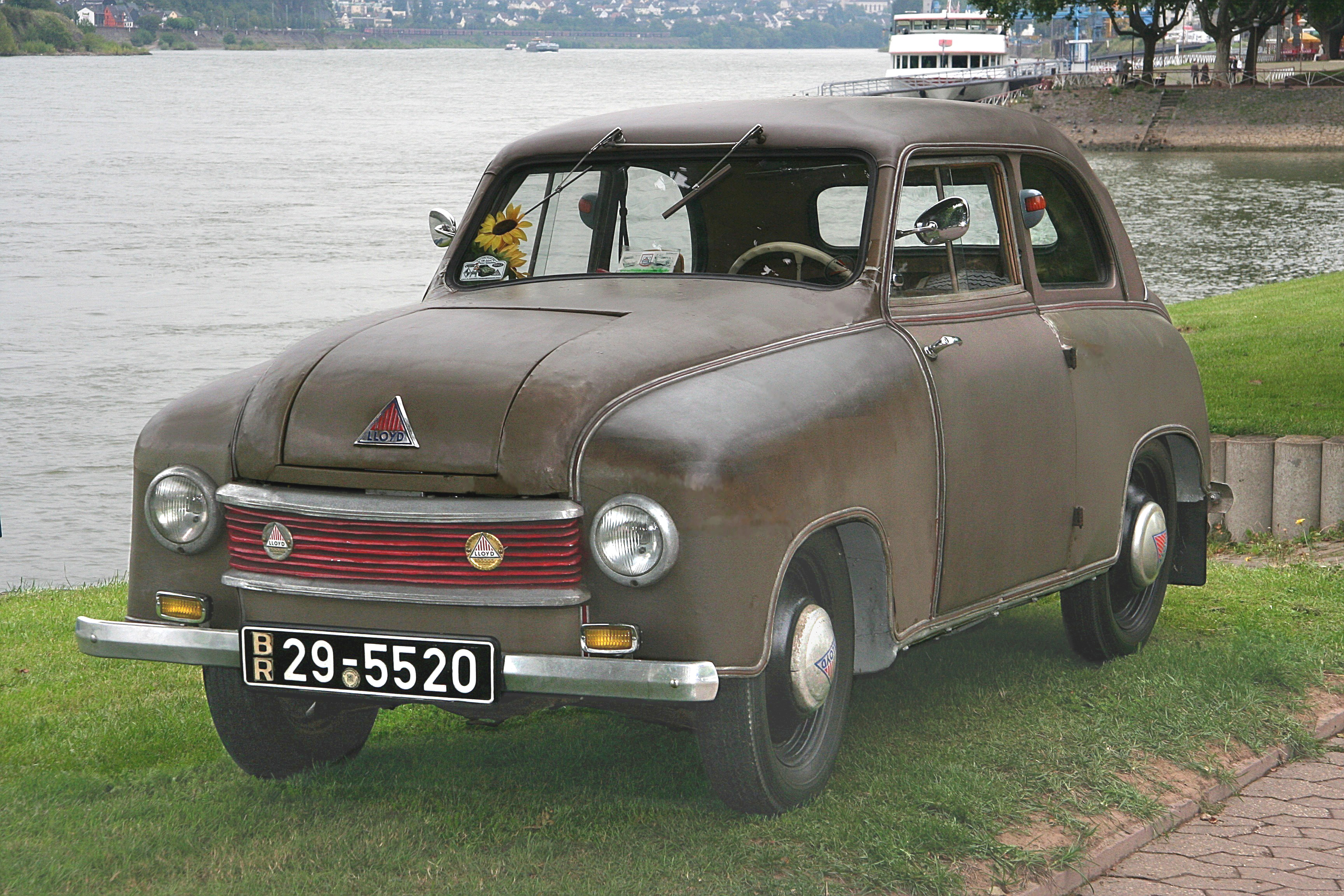
Lloyd LP 300 (Leukoplastbomber)

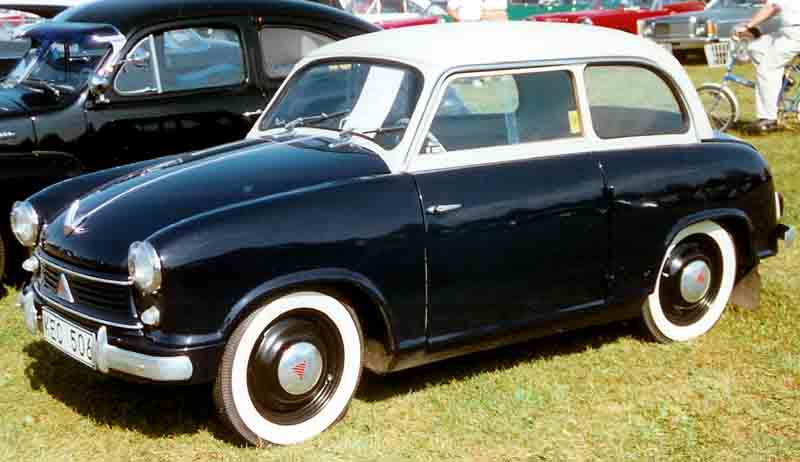
Lloyd LP 400 S 1954

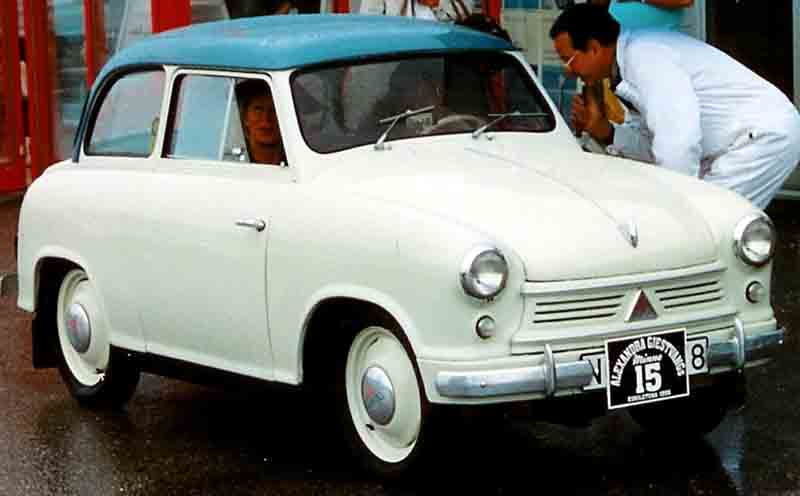
Lloyd LP 400 S 1955

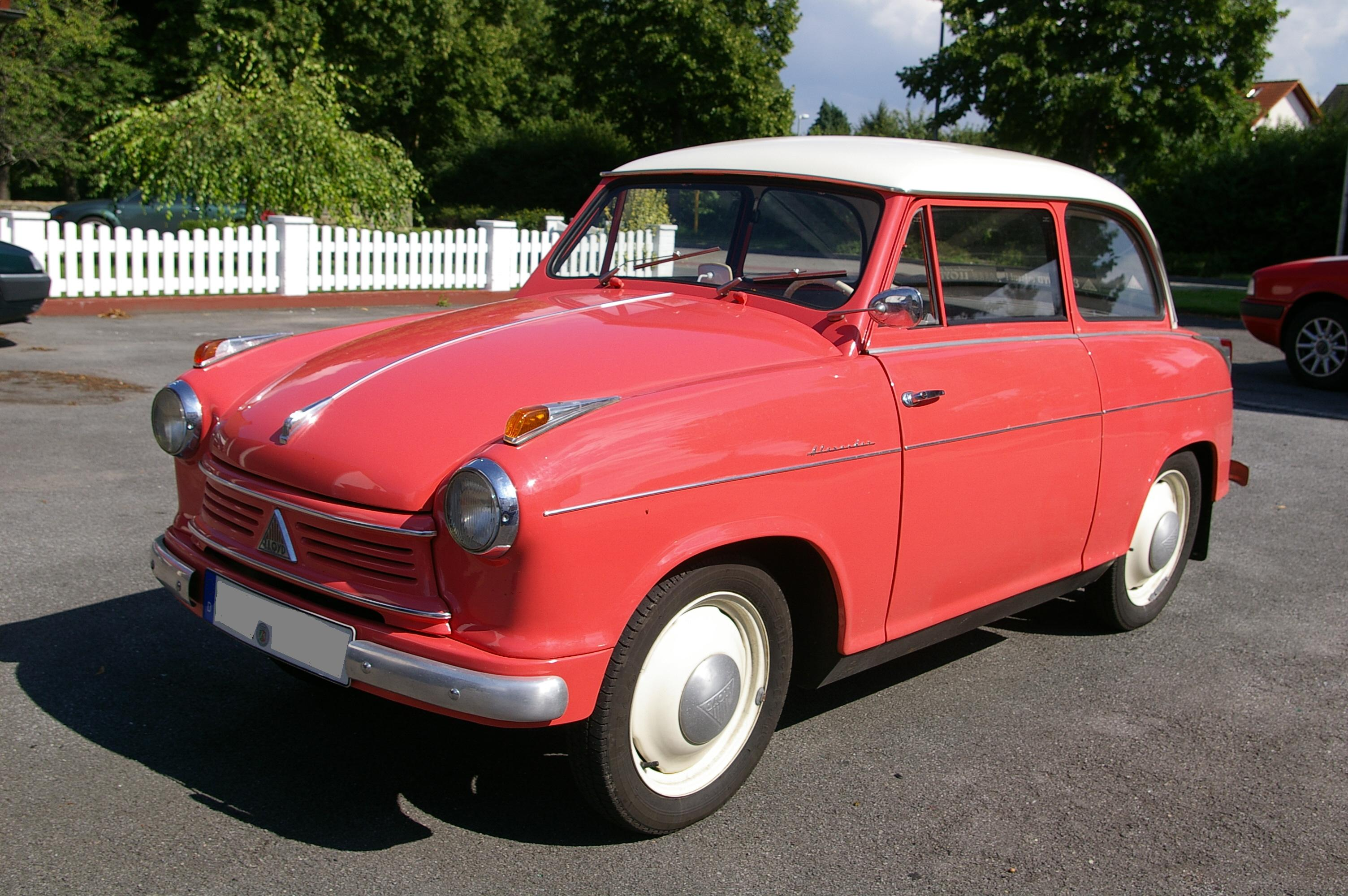
Lloyd LP 600

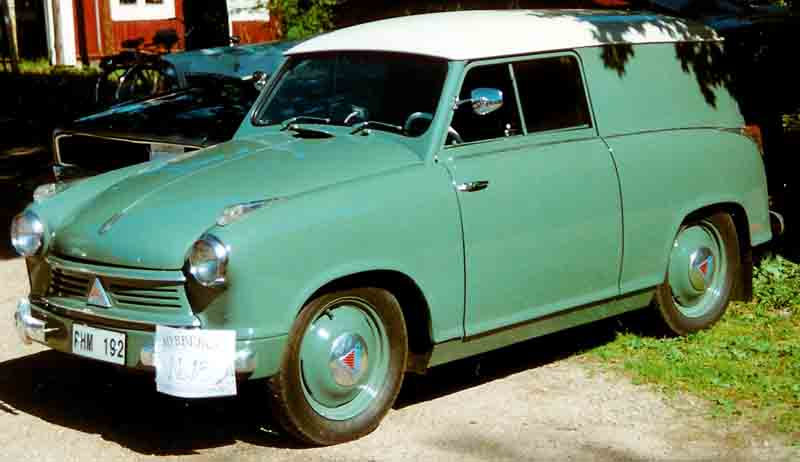
1959 Lloyd 600 Kastenwagen (panel van)

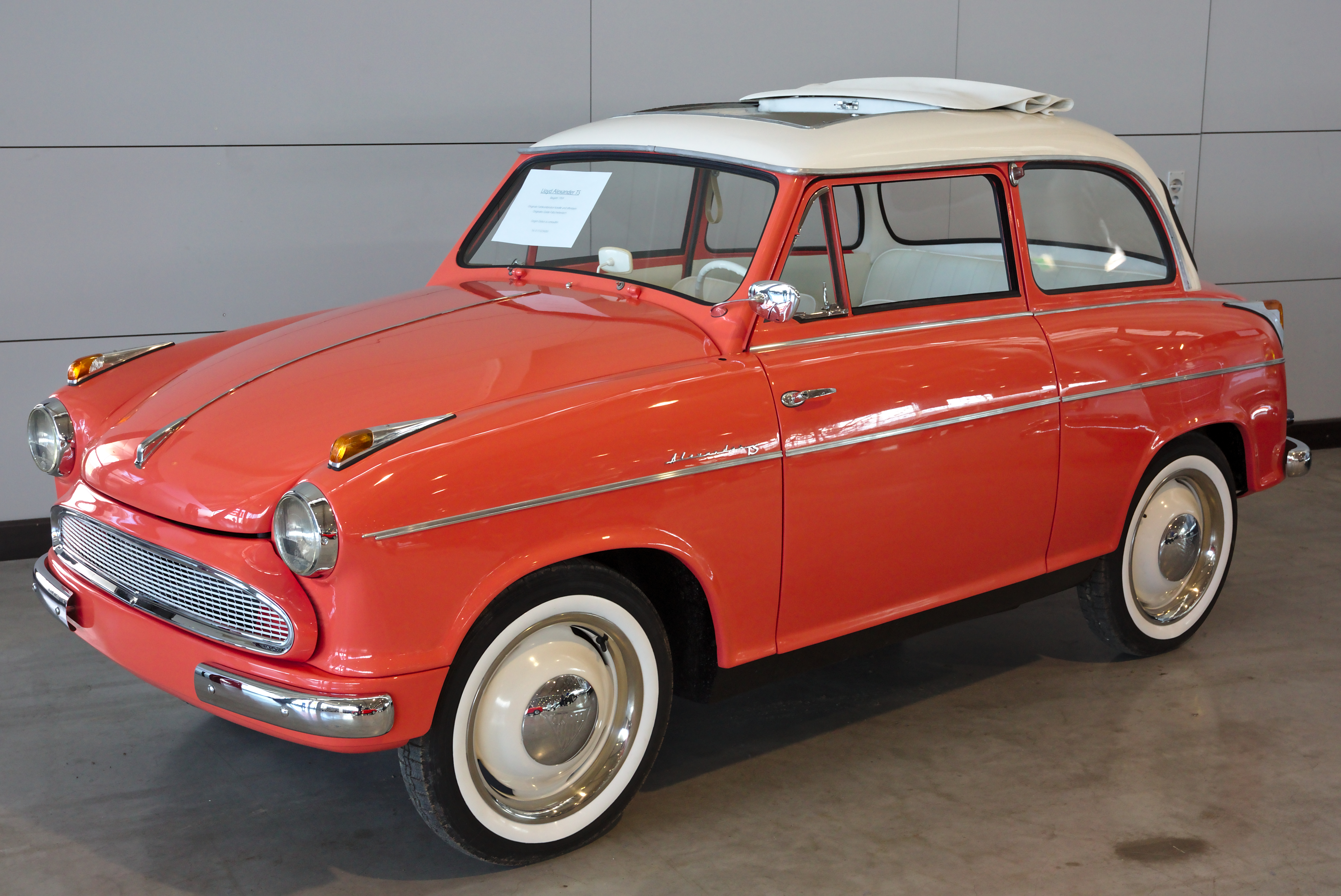
Lloyd Alexander TS

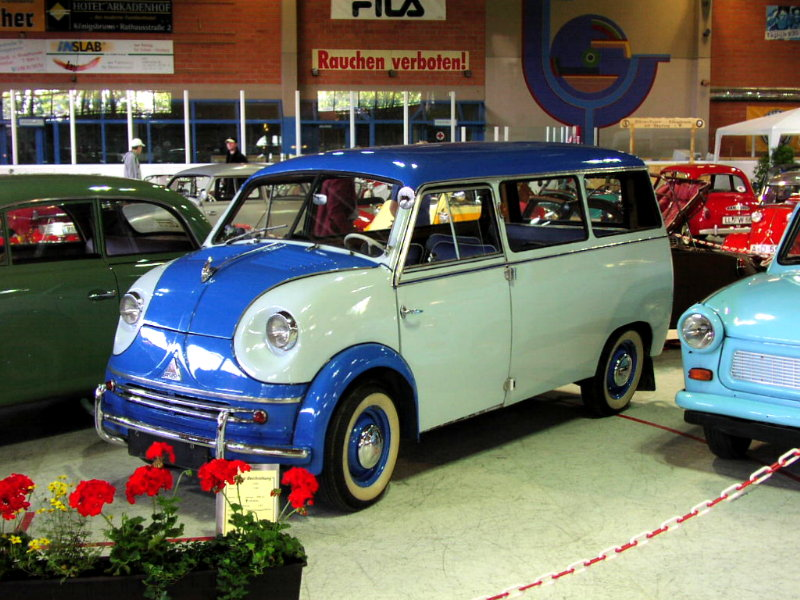
Lloyd LT 600

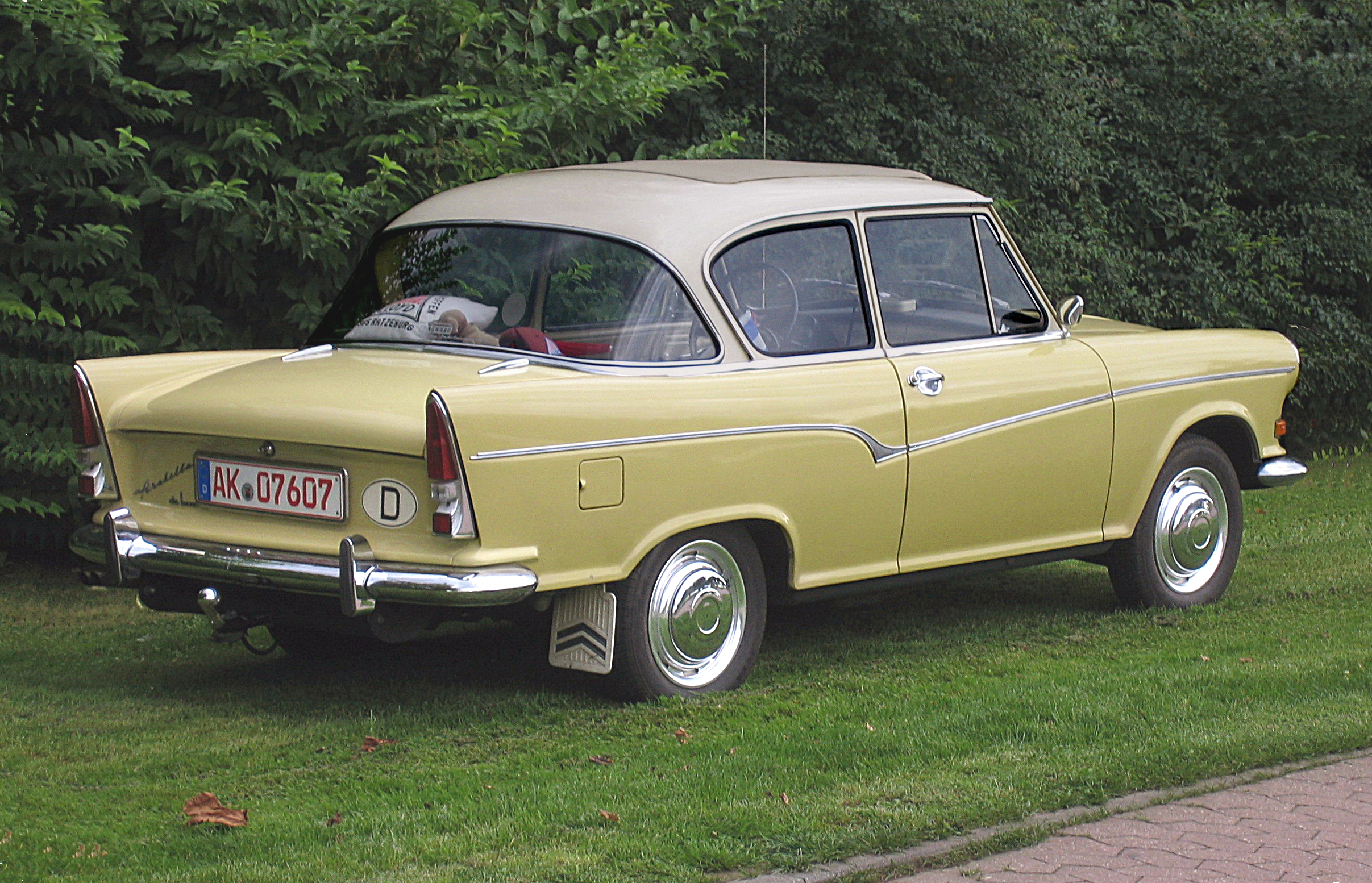
Lloyd Arabella de Luxe

Lloyd as a stand-alone name only entered mass-production of cars and light trucks in 1950, when the company became Lloyd Motoren Werke GmbH – still in Bremen. The very first cars (the Lloyd 300) were wood- and fabric-bodied. Between 1953 and 1954, thin, rolled steel gradually replaced the original fabric shell (Lloyd 400), but wood framing was still used within the doors and elsewhere.

The Lloyd 250 was called "Prüfungsangst-Lloyd" ("Lloyd for exam nerves") because they appealed to drivers who had older driving licenses and could drive the car without having to pass the new test for drivers of cars with a cubic capacity of over 250 cc, a test which was introduced in a legal reform in the mid-1950s. With an engine producing only 11 PS (DIN), the Lloyd designers saw a need for saving weight, and thus offered the LP 250 without a back seat, bumpers, hub caps or trims. However, most buyers ordered the LP 250 V with those features as optional extras.

Overall, the vehicles filled the need for small, cheap cars, which were characteristic of post-war Germany, and they provided a comparatively high standard of comfort and reliability. For several years in the 1950s, they rose to third place in the annual licensing statistics, behind only Volkswagen and Opel. In spite of that success, there was little prestige gained in driving a Lloyd. In the vernacular, the Lloyd 300 was called "Leukoplastbomber", due to the owners' habit of repairing nicks in the fabric of the body with sticking plaster called Leukoplast. A contemporary derisive verse went "Wer den Tod nicht scheut, fährt Lloyd" ("He who is not afraid of death, drives a Lloyd").

Pietro Frua designed a coupé based on the Lloyd Alexander, which was presented at the Turin Motor Show in November 1958.

The parent company failed in 1961 but cars were still made up to 1963. By that time, the LP 900 was named "Borgward Arabella" instead of "Lloyd Arabella".

=== Models ===
Type	Body style	Period	Engine	cubic capacity	hp (DIN)	Gears	Speed
Lloyd LP 300	saloon	1950–1952	2 cylinders two-stroke	293	10	3	75 km/h (47 mph)
Lloyd LS 300 / LK 300	LS: estate car LK: van	1951–1952	2 cylinders two-stroke	293	10	3	75 km/h (47 mph)
Lloyd LC 300	coupé	1951–1952	2 cylinders two-stroke	293	10	3	75 km/h (47 mph)
Lloyd LP 400	saloon	1953–1957	2 cylinders two-stroke	386	13	3	75 km/h (47 mph)
Lloyd LS 400 / LK 400	LS: estate car LK: van	1953–1957	2 cylinders two-stroke	386	13	3	75 km/h (47 mph)
Lloyd LC 400	convertible	1953–1957	2 cylinders two-stroke	386	13	3	75 km/h (47 mph)
Lloyd LT 500	van / 6-seater minivan	1953–1957	2 cylinders two-stroke	386	13	3	75 km/h (47 mph)
Lloyd LP 250 and 250 V	saloon	1956–1957	2 cylinders two-stroke	250	11	3	75 km/h (47 mph)
Lloyd LP 600	saloon	1955–1961	2 cylinders four-stroke	596	19	3	100 km/h (62 mph)
Lloyd LS 600 / LK 600	LS: estate car LK: van	1955–1961	2 cylinders four-stroke	596	19	4	100 km/h (62 mph)
Lloyd LC 600	convertible "Cabrio-Limousine"	1955–1961	2 cylinders four-stroke	596	19	4	100 km/h (62 mph)
Lloyd Alexander	saloon or estate car	1957–1961	2 cylinders four-stroke	596	19	4	100 km/h (62 mph)
Lloyd Alexander TS	saloon or estate car	1958–1961	2 cylinders four-stroke	596	25	4	107 km/h (66 mph)
Lloyd LT 600	van/minivan pickup truck	1955–1961	2 cylinders four-stroke	596	19	4	85 km/h (53 mph)
Lloyd Theodor	LT 600 RV	1955–1961	2 cylinders four-stroke	596	19	4	85 km/h (53 mph)
Lloyd Arabella	saloon	1959–1961	4 cylinders four-stroke	897	38; 1960–1963 also 34	4	120 km/h (75 mph)
Lloyd Arabella de Luxe	saloon	1960–1961	4 cylinders four-stroke	897	45	4	133 km/h (83 mph)
Lloyd EL 1500	electric van		electric	-		-	
Lloyd EL 2500	electric van		electric	-		-	

Type	number of cars built
Lloyd 300 LP, LS and LC	18,087
Lloyd 400 LP, LS and LC	109,878
Lloyd 250 and 250 V	3,768
Lloyd 600 LP, LS and LC, Alexander and Alexander TS	176,524
Lloyd Arabella and Arabella de Luxe	47,549

== Australian production – The Lloyd-Hartnett ==
The Lloyd 600 was assembled in Australia by a company formed as joint venture between Carl Borgward and Laurence Hartnett in the late 1950s. The car was introduced in December 1957 as the Lloyd-Hartnett and a total of 3000 cars were built before production ceased in 1962.
