= Compact van =

Type of van

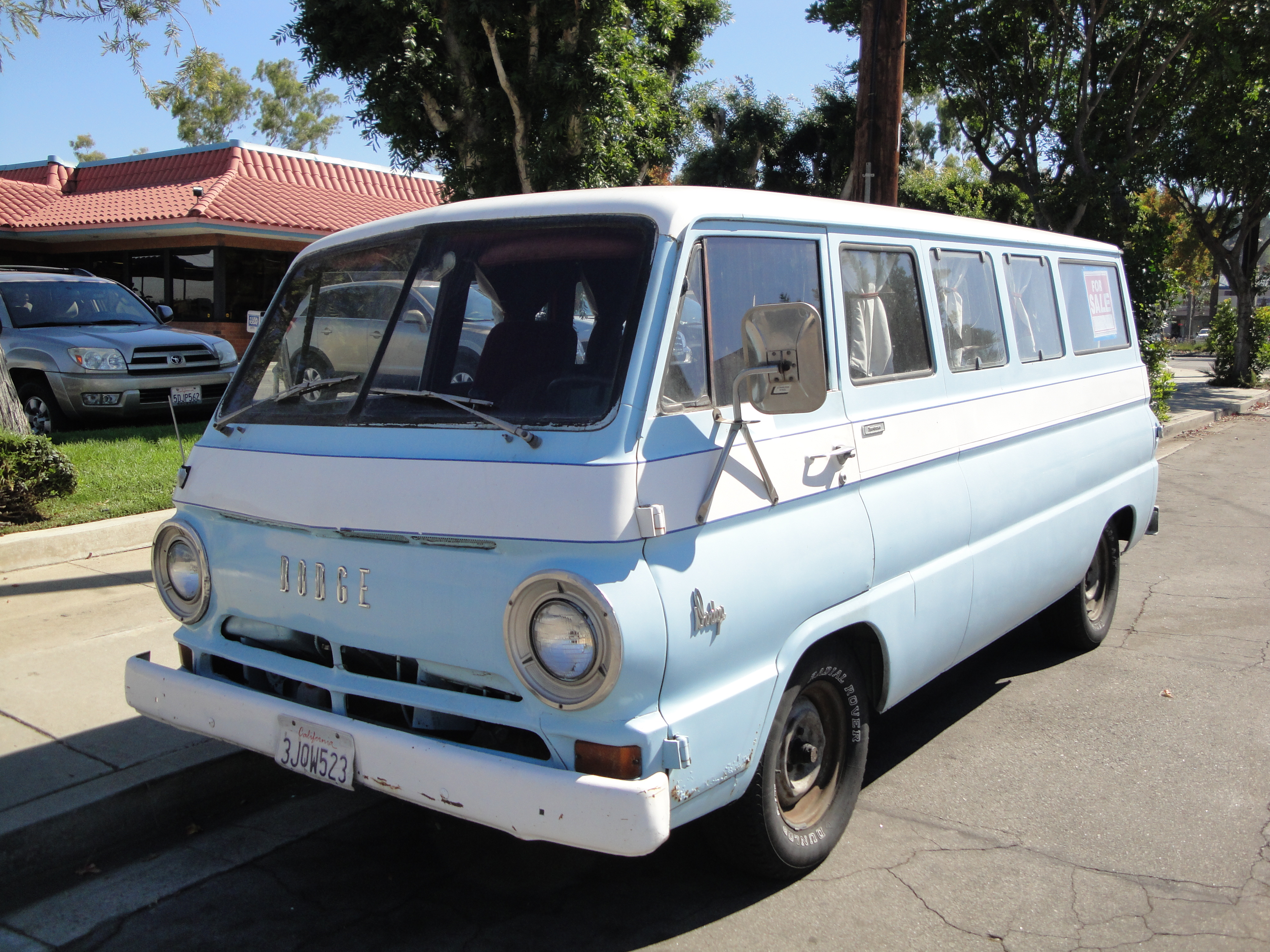
Dodge A100

A compact van is a type of van characterized by a flat front design, mechanicals based on a compact car, an engine placed either at the rear or between and behind the front seats, and similar in size to the VW Bus.

Popular in the United States during the 1960s, they were replaced by full-size vans at the start of the next decade. These large vans used body-on-frame construction and featured front engines under a short hood.

== Modern Revival ==
Around the 2010s, several compact vans entered the North American market, including the Ford Transit Connect, Ram Promaster City, Chevrolet City Express, and Nissan NV200.

== Microvans ==
In Japan, vans that comply with Kei car regulations are known as microvans.

== Examples ==
- Dodge A100
- Ford E-Series (first generation)
- Chevrolet Greenbrier
- Chevrolet Van (first and second generations)
- Lloyd LT 500

== Gallery ==
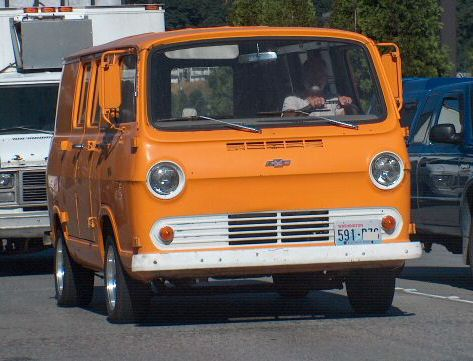
First generation of Chevrolet Van with flat windshield

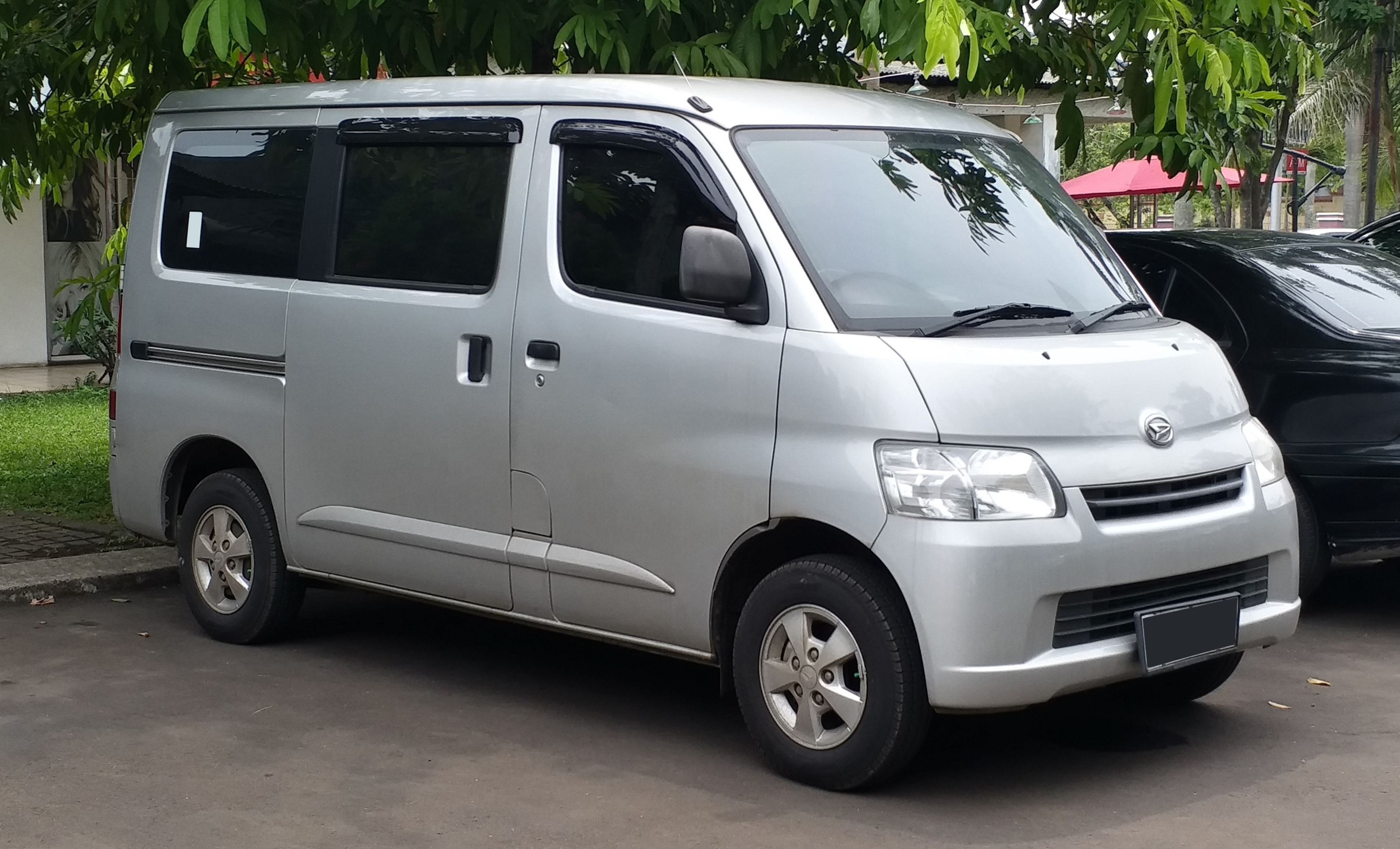
Daihatsu Gran Max

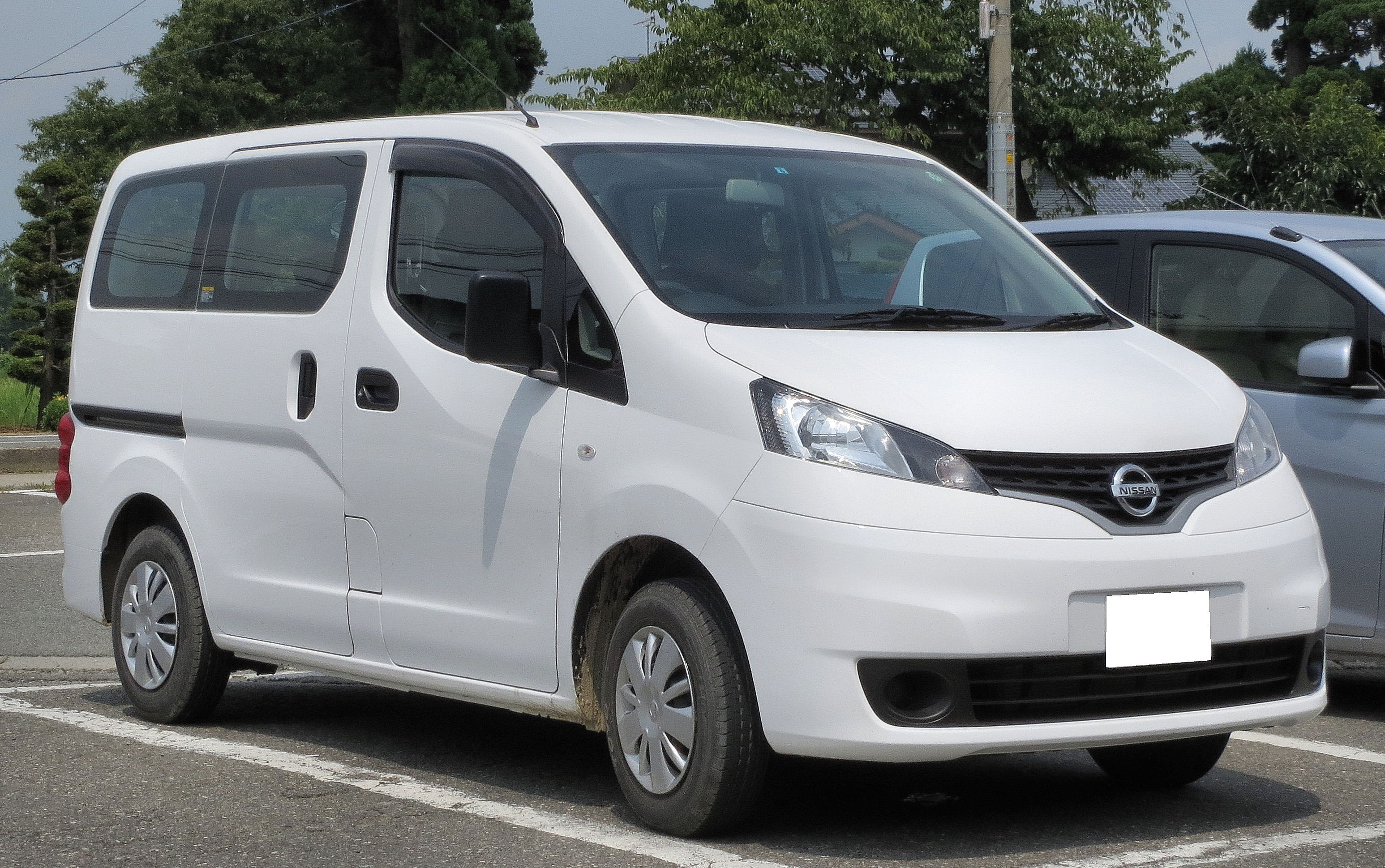
Nissan NV200
