= Lloyd 600 =

Lloyd 600 (1955–1961) Lloyd Alexander (1957–1961) Lloyd Alexander TS (1957–1961)
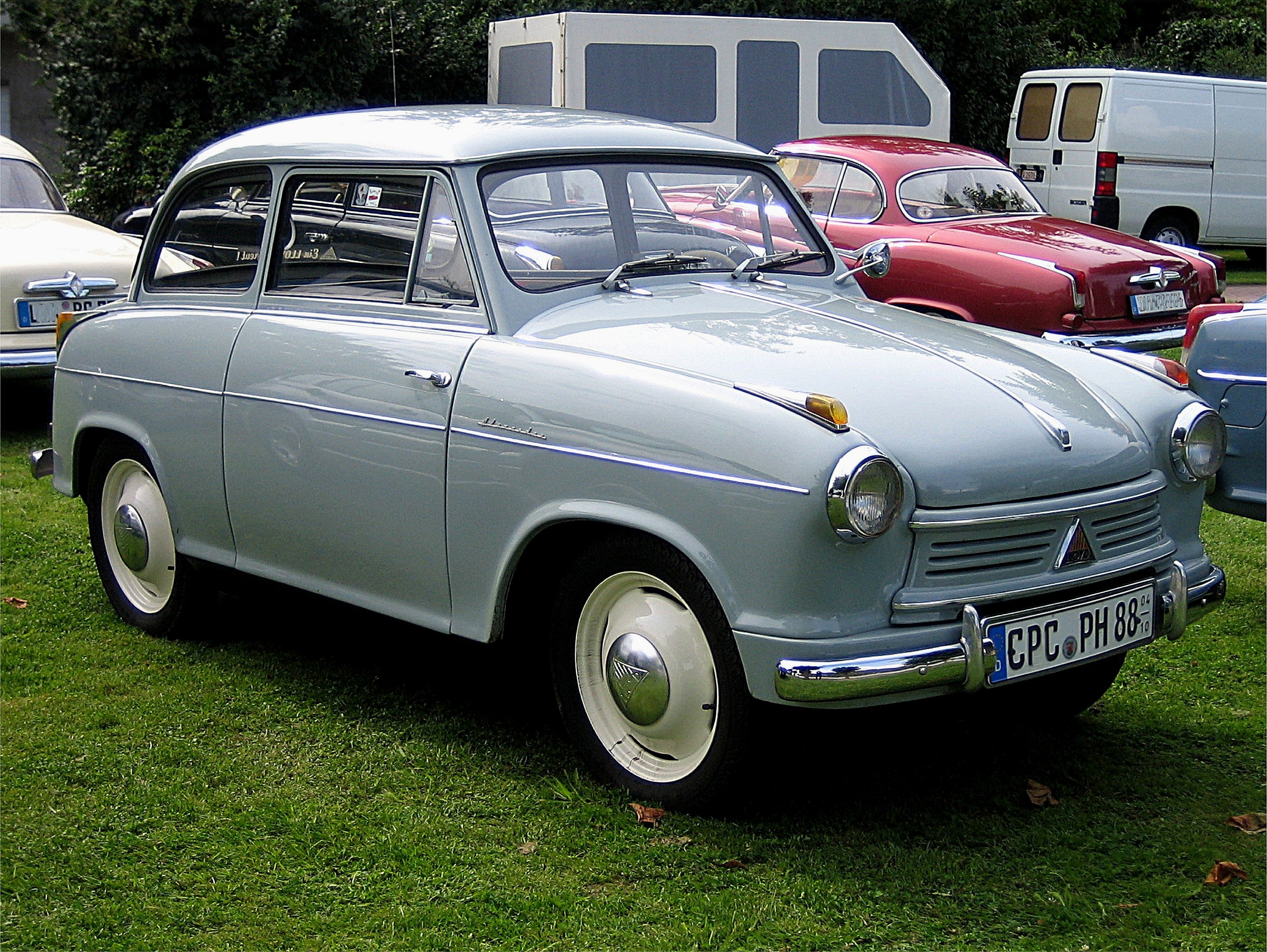
- Lloyd Alexander (standard)

Overview
- Manufacturer: Lloyd Motoren Werke (Borgward Group)
- Also called: Lloyd-Hartnett (Australia)
- Production: 1955–1961; 176,524 built (Lloyd 600 & Alexander combined)
- Assembly: West Germany: Bremen; Australia

Body and chassis
- Body style: 2-door saloon 2-door convertible 2-door station wagon ("Kombi"); 2-door panel van
- Layout: FF layout

Powertrain
- Engine: 596 cc four-stroke 2-cylinder (parallel twin); 19/25 PS (HP): 13/18 kW
- Transmission: 3-speed manual 4-speed manual (Alexander TS)

Dimensions
- Wheelbase: 2,000 mm (78.7 in)
- Length: 3,355 mm (132.1 in)
- Width: 1,410 mm (55.5 in)
- Height: 1,400 mm (55.1 in)
- Curb weight: 540–580 kg (1,190–1,279 lb) (empty); 850–910 kg (1,874–2,006 lb) (loaded)

The Lloyd 600 is a small car produced by the Borgward Group's Lloyd Motoren Werke (Lloyd Motor Works) in Bremen between 1955 and 1961.

The Lloyd Alexander was identical to the Lloyd 600 in most respects, but in place of the three speed transmission of the Lloyd 600, the Lloyd Alexander featured a four-speed gear-box (and a higher final drive ratio). The Lloyd Alexander was offered, in parallel with the Lloyd 600, between 1957 and 1961. One difference visible from the outside was that the Lloyd Alexander included an opening hatch into the rear luggage locker, whereas drivers of the Lloyd 600 had to reach behind the rear seat in order to access the luggage locker.

There was also a Lloyd Alexander TS offered between 1958 and 1961 which featured a larger carburetor and a high final drive ratio, as a result of which it offered a maximum power output of 25 PS instead of the 19 PS available from the engine fitted to the Lloyd 600 and standard Lloyd Alexander.

== Engine and running gear ==
=== Lloyd 600 and Lloyd Alexander ===
The Lloyd 600 and Lloyd Alexander were powered by an air-cooled two cylinder engine with a chain driven overhead camshaft. Unlike the Lloyd 400 which the Lloyd 600 initially complemented and then – after 1957 – replaced, the newer car featured a four-stroke engine. The cylinders were configured in parallel. The engine capacity of 596cc provided for a maximum power output of 19 PS (14 kW) at 4,500 rpm in the version supplied on the Lloyd 600 and the standard Lloyd Alexander, applying a 6.6:1 compression ratio. The top speed listed was 100 km/h (63 mph) and the car could reach 100 km/h from a standing start in 60 seconds. The car was fueled using "regular" grade petrol/gasoline and when driven normally consumed fuel significantly more frugally than West Germany's best selling small car, the Volkswagen Beetle. Space was at a premium in the Lloyd 600 and the 25 litre fuel tank was accommodated ahead of the bulkhead underneath the front hood/bonnet in a space shared with the engine and the six-volt battery. Power was fed to the front wheels via a three-speed manual gear box which used the same ratios as it had on the earlier Lloyd 400 from which it was lifted.

The front wheels were suspended from two transversely mounted overlapping leaf-springs, supported by telescopic shock absorbers: the rear wheels were attached to a Swing axle supported with longitudinally mounted leaf springs. The footbrake was controlled using a hydraulic linkage and drum brakes all round. The hand-brake worked on the front wheels and was operated with a cable linkage. The steering employed a rack and pinion mechanism which was conventional at the time. It required 2¼ turns between opposite locks: the turning circle was 10.45 m (34.3 ft).

=== Lloyd Alexander TS ===
The Lloyd Alexander TS which appeared in 1958 was easy to differentiate from the basic Lloyd Alexander due to its "semi-elliptical" (more curved edges) front grille. The TS was fitted with an all-synchromesh four-speed gear box. Thanks to the larger carburetor and raised compression ratio – in this application of 7.2:1 – the manufacturer was able to claim a top speed for the Lloyd Alexander TS of 107 km/h (68 mph) and the time to 100 km/h from a standing start was reduced to 56 seconds.

The Lloyd Alexander TS also came with a completely redesigned back axle, which significantly improved the car's handling, and anticipated the rear-suspension configuration on the Lloyd Arabella (which appeared in Lloyd showrooms the next year). The rear axle was attached using semi-trailing arms (generally identified in contemporary sources simply as "trailing arms") with "progressively acting" coil springs. The TS also incorporated detailed enhancements such as the windscreen washer system and, new for 1957, asymmetrically dipping headlight beams.

== Lloyd 600: Names ==
Sources sometimes follow the manufacturer in adding a two-letter prefix to the name of the Lloyd 600 in order to differentiate between different body types as follows:

- Lloyd LP 600: Limousine (saloon/sedan)
- Lloyd LC 600: Cabrio-Limousine (cabriolet)
- Lloyd LS 600: Kombi (estate/station wagon)
- Lloyd LK 600: Kastenwagen (panel van)

According to the manufacturer "LP" was short for "Lloyd-Personenwagen" (Lloyd Passenger-car). However, it quickly became adapted for the alternative epithet, "Leukoplastbomber", an untranslatable term, heavy with irony, and originally applied to the LP300 in 1952 when the car's outer body was formed not of steel panels but of plastic synthetic-leather sections fitted over a timber frame.

== Body ==
As with its predecessor, the Lloyd 400, the full name of the Lloyd 600 featured a two letter prefix that identified the body shape as follows: LP600 ("Limousine" / saloon), LC600 ("Cabrio-Limousine" / cabriolet), LK600 (panel van) and LS600 (estate). With the Lloyd Alexander these prefixes were dropped. There was, in any case, no "Cabrio-Limousine" version of the Lloyd Alexander listed.

Ten years earlier, with steel in desperately short supply, Lloyds in this class had been constructed round a timber frame, and covered with synthetic leather, or more recently using a combination of steel panels for the "outer door skins" and fabric covering for parts of the car body not needing the same level of exterior rigidity. This history was reflected in the structural architecture of the newer steel-bodied Lloyd 600 and Lloyd Alexander models. The Lloyd 400 had, since October 1954, used an all-steel body, with panels that were bolted on to the steel frame and were therefore far easier to replace, if necessary, than bent body panels on competitor models from Volkswagen or NSU, constructed with welded steel body shells. This feature was carried over to the Lloyd 600 and Lloyd Alexander. The body sat of a tubular steel chassis.

The windscreen on the Lloyd 600 and Lloyd Alexander models was flat. At the back, however, on all Lloyd saloons/sedans a small flat rear window had been replaced by a full-width curved rear window back in 1954. The doors were hinged at their rear edge through till 1961, by which the arrangement was becoming rare. It facilitated access, at least to the front seats, but by the 1960s people were beginning to express safety concerns over the risk of the doors bursting open while the car was moving.

The Lloyd Alexander saloon / sedan was differentiated from the Lloyd 600 by an external "boot/trunk lid" giving access to the luggage compartment for those unable or unwilling to clamber into the passenger cabin and reach past the back of the back seat. Another visible difference was the windows on the doors, which on the Lloyd Alexander wound down fully into the doors. On the Lloyd 600 only the front half of the two part door window could be opened, sliding horizontally backwards, a lightweight inexpensive arrangement which was replicated in Britain on the first Minis in 1959.

The Lloyd 600 / Lloyd Alexander body offered accommodation in the passenger cabin for four adults, but access to the rear seat was difficult and space cramped, with the width of the back seat reduced by the space taken up by the rear wheel arches. There was more space at the front, although there were criticisms that the steering wheel was too close to the driver. The luggage locker at the back had a total computed capacity of 104 litres.

Lloyd itself still had no heavy presses for stamping body panels from sheet steel. Body panels for the Lloyd 600 and Lloyd Alexander were produced by Allgaier and Karmann and then delivered in bare-metal form to the Lloyd factory in Bremen for machining, assembly and painting.

== Commercial ==
Lloyd 600 and Alexander:
Combined output (units)

- 1955 ..... 7,697
- 1956 ....35,329
- 1957 ....45,907
- 1958 ....47,780
- 1959 ....34,565
- 1960 ..... 4,998
- 1961 ..... 1,246
- 1962 ............. 2

During the 1950s the small car market in West Germany was increasingly dominated by Volkswagen. In 1955, Volkswagen produced 279,986 passenger cars. Apart from a handful of exotic looking (and exotically priced) Karmann Ghia vehicles, the passenger cars produced by Volkswagen were all the same shape. The shape had been innovative twenty years earlier, but the architecture and look of the car had changed very little since. The approach of the Borgward Group could hardly have been more different. In 1955 the group produced 91,810 passenger cars, using three different brands and offering a wider range of models than any other West German manufacturer, with models replaced or substantially upgraded every few years. One result of these contrasting approaches was that it was Volkswagen that set the prices in what was still an acutely price sensitive market segment. In March 1954 the price of a standard Volkswagen Beetle was reduced to DM 3,950. It came down again, to DM 3,790, in August 1955, a level that it held till 1961.

The standard Lloyd 600 was priced, between 1955 and 1958 at DM 3,680, a price which after 1955 undercut the larger and faster (albeit less fuel efficient and, some felt, more "old-fashioned") Volkswagen by a margin of barely more than DM 100. With the Lloyd Alexander, launched in 1957, there was no attempt to undercut the basic Volkswagen on price. The standard Lloyd Alexander was launched in 1957 with an advertised price of DM 4,060. The Lloyd Alexander TS arrived in 1958 priced at DM 4,330.

Sales analysis differentiating between the Lloyd 600 and the Lloyd Alexander has not been located, but combining the two models gives a sales volume between 1955 and 1961 of 176,524 units. Sales dropped off sharply in 1960 which was the first full year of production for the manufacturer's own new Arabella model. The first NSU Prinz, very similar in terms of size and performance, and priced in 1958 at DM 3,739, managed a production volume of 94,549 units between 1958 and 1962. By 1960 Volkswagen were producing more than 700,000 Beetles in a single year. Their West German competitors were feeling the squeeze.

== Australian assembly ==
The Lloyd 600 was assembled in Australia by a company formed as joint venture between Carl Borgward and Laurence Hartnett in the late 1950s. The car was introduced in December 1957 as the Lloyd-Hartnett and a total of 3000 cars were built before production ceased in 1962.

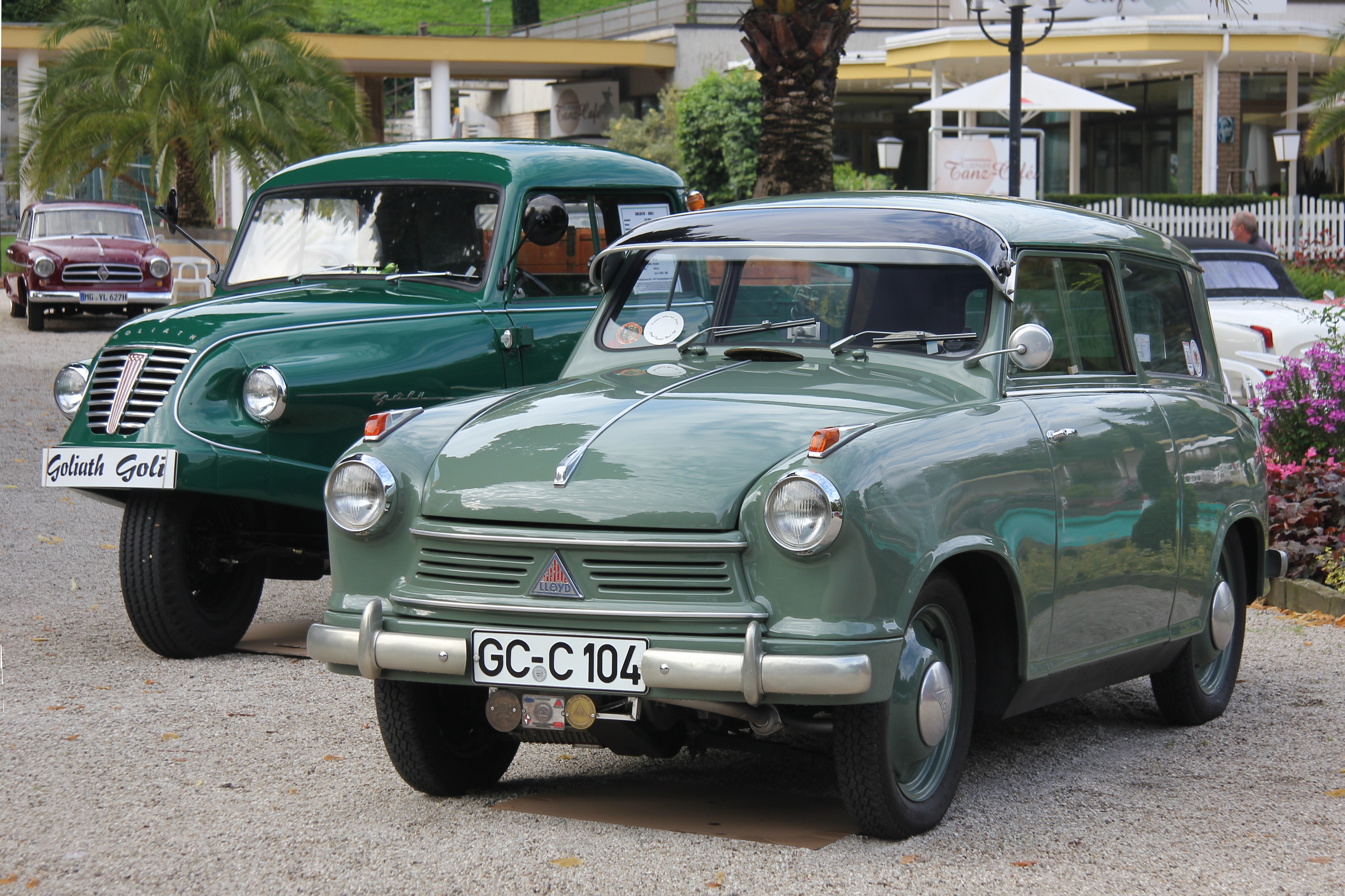
Lloyd LS 600

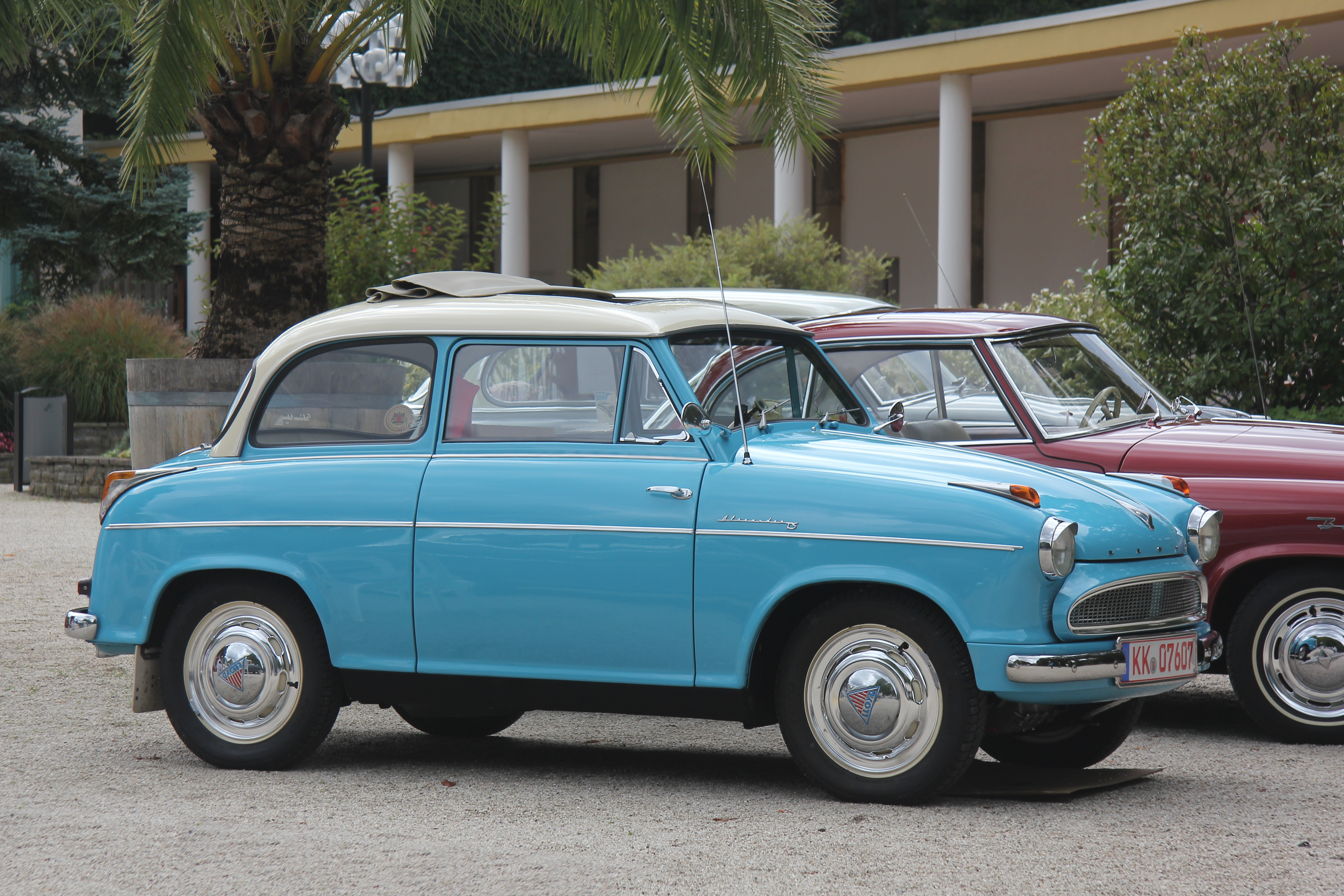
Lloyd Alexander TS
(The modified grille was standard on the TS. The wheels on this example were probably retrofitted more recently, however.)

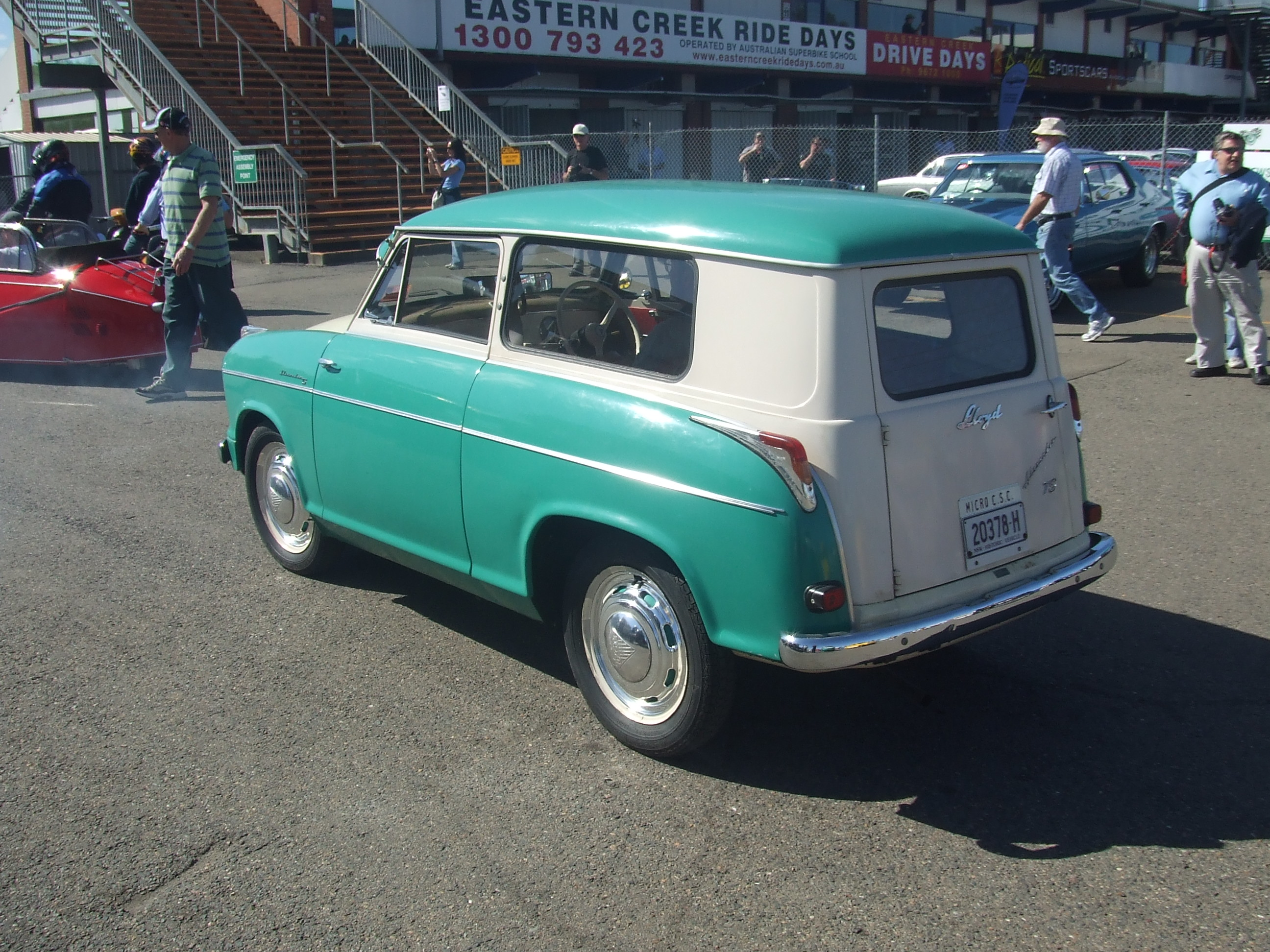
Lloyd Alexander TS Kombi

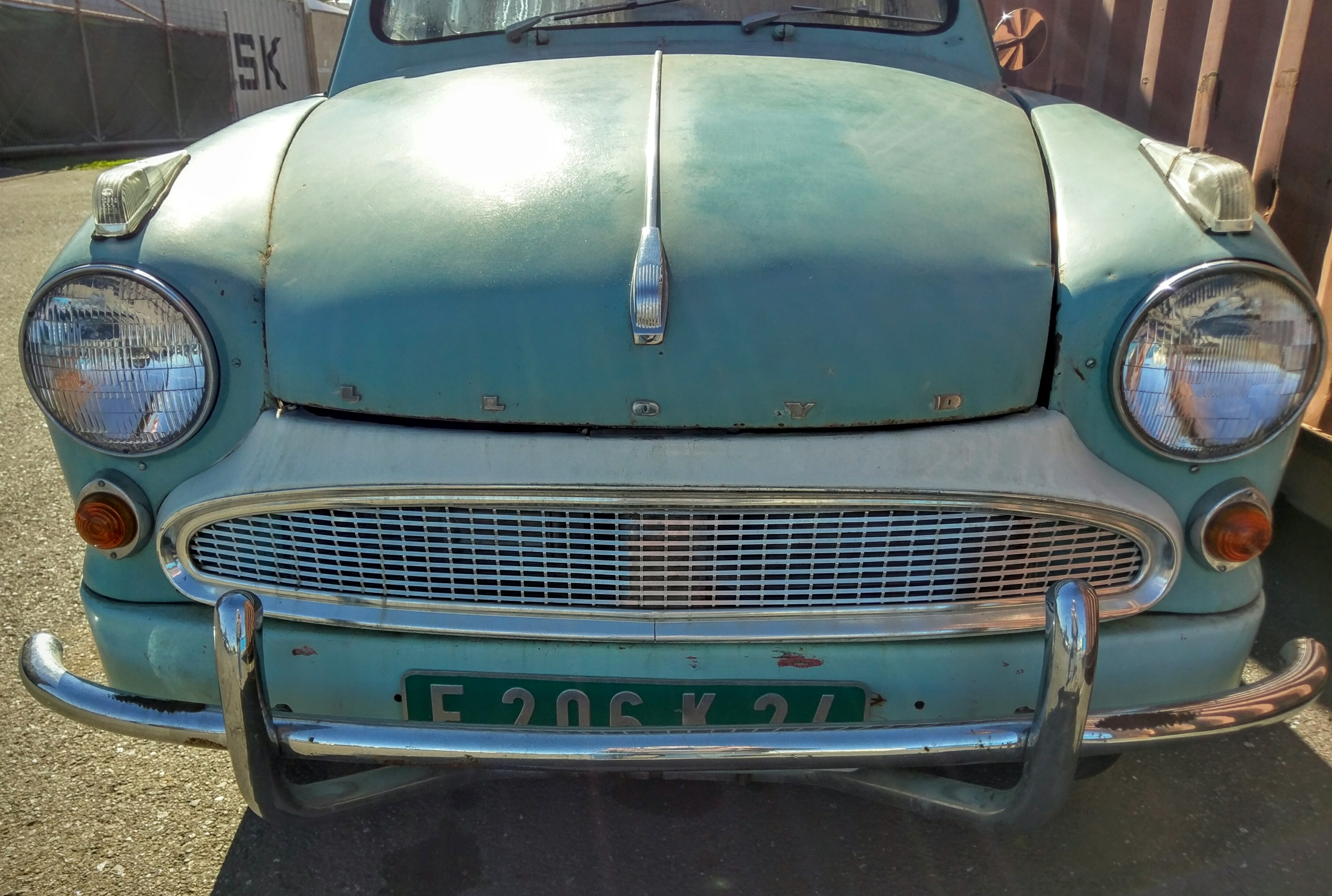
Semi elliptical Lloyd Alexander TS grille

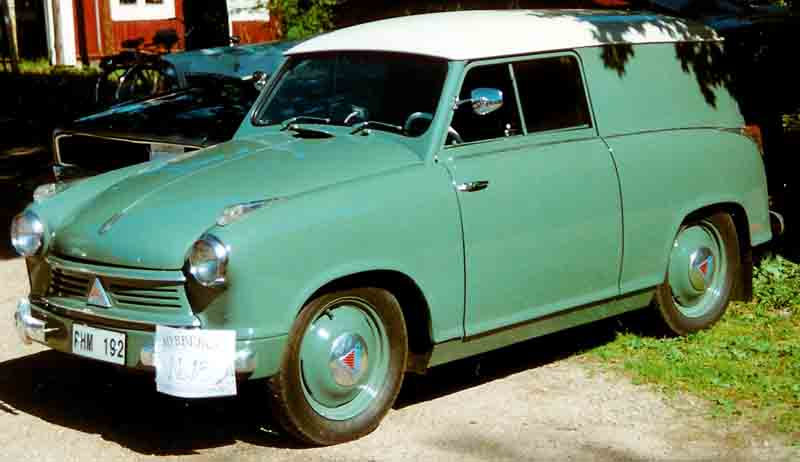
1959 Lloyd LK 600 van
