= Suzuki Fronte 800 =

Suzuki Fronte 800 (C10)
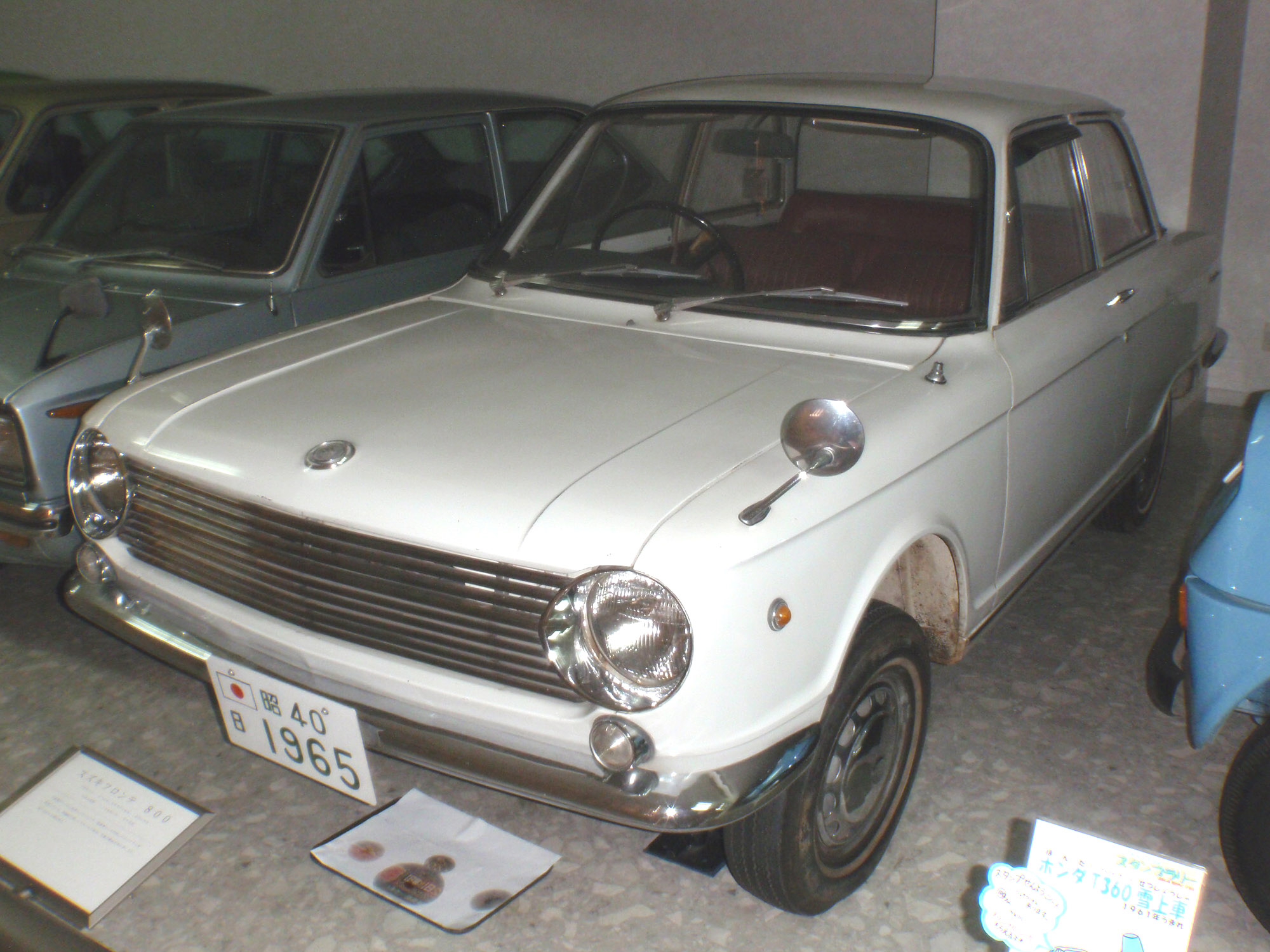

Overview
- Production: December 1965–April 1969

Body and chassis
- Class: Subcompact (B)
- Body style: 2-door sedan
- Layout: FF, transversely mounted

Powertrain
- Engine: 785 cc C10 2-stroke I3
- Transmission: 4-speed manual

Dimensions
- Wheelbase: 2,200 mm (86.6 in)
- Length: 3,870 mm (152.4 in)
- Width: 1,480 mm (58.3 in)
- Height: 1,360 mm (53.5 in)
- Curb weight: 770 kg (1,698 lb)

The Suzuki Fronte 800 is a subcompact car with a two-stroke engine built by the Suzuki Motor Corporation in the latter half of the 1960s.

== History ==
Introduced in August 1965 (and on sale by December), the Fronte 800 was an attempt at competing in a higher market segment than the Suzulight Kei jidosha class offerings. The name from its smaller engined brother, the Fronte, was retained to aid the publicity effort. A four-door 700 cc prototype was shown at the 1962 Tokyo Motor Show, clothed in a body designed by Pietro Frua, reminiscent of his Maserati Quattroporte I and Glas 1700 saloons. This line of development was not followed, with work on the Y4 prototype instead begun in 1962, another prototype appearing at the 1963 Tokyo Motor Show. Imminent production was announced, but at the '64 Motor Show another pre-production model was shown, with sales promised for the spring of the following year. Actual production, never but in a small scale and largely hand built, began in December 1965.

=== Engine ===
The three-cylinder, two-stroke 785 cc engine was very similar to that of the 796 cc DKW Junior/F11, with a 0.5 mm (0.02 in) smaller bore and exactly the same stroke. Top speed was 115 km/h, and the car was only available with a fully synchronized 4-speed column mounted manual transmission. The engine produces 41 PS (30 kW) at 4,000 rpm and has 8.1 kg⋅m (79 N⋅m; 59 lb⋅ft) of torque at 3,500 rpm. Introductory price was ¥465,000, with a ¥545,000 DeLuxe version also available.

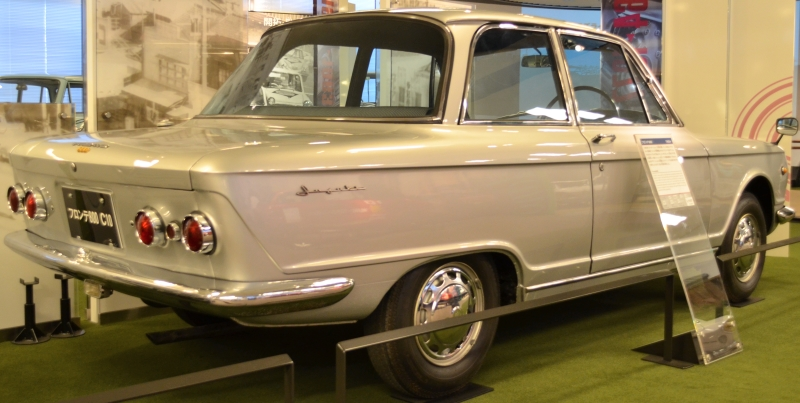
Rear view of Fronte 800

The body was a modern unibody design, only available as a two-door sedan. While rumoured to have been executed by Michelotti, design was credited to Suzuki chief designer Sasaki Toru (佐々木亨), who crafted a modern "soapbox" design with large glass surfaces. Suspension was an independent torsion bar design on all four wheels, with wishbones in front and trailing arms in rear. Drum brakes were used all around. Sales were slow, as the car competed directly with more popular cars like the Toyota Publica which were not handicapped by the Suzuki's by now outmoded two-stroke engine. While kei car buyers did not mind putting up with such a construction, car buyers in this segment were by now demanding more.

=== History ===
The 800 did not see many updates during its production life: In April 1966 it gained separate front seats; as of June reclining such were available. A version with separate front seats received a floor-mounted shifter. By August 1966 the Standard version was cancelled, leaving only the DeLuxe. Production was cancelled in April 1969 after less than 3,000 were built in four years; slow sales, need for capacity to produce the hit Fronte 360, and a perceived inability to compete with the large domestic manufacturers in what had become the most closely contested Japanese market segment spelled the end of the 800. By the time of the 1969 Tokyo Motor Show, the Fronte 800 had disappeared from Suzuki's pricelists, with 2717 built and 2612 sold. Suzuki was to focus exclusively on kei cars (and bigger engined iterations thereof) until the 1983 introduction of the Cultus.

The 1980s Suzuki Fronte hatchback was also marketed as the "Fronte 800" in some smaller markets such as Chile. Most countries outside Japan received this particular car as the "Alto".

== Fronte 1100 ==
A 1.1 litre version, the C20, was developed for a planned "Fronte 1100" model. The engine's design paralleled that of the 68 PS (50 kW) 1,175 cc DKW F102, but the triple Solex-carburetted 80 PS (59 kW) C20 was considerably more powerful. The front disc-brake equipped Fronte 1100's top speed was 160 km/h (99 mph), but tiny Suzuki opted not to continue competing head on with the offerings of bigger manufacturers such as Toyota and Nissan. Additionally, with the market failure of the F102 the writing was on the wall for the two-stroke engine in cars any larger than the very smallest.
