= Suzuki Fronte =

Japanese automobile produced by Suzuki

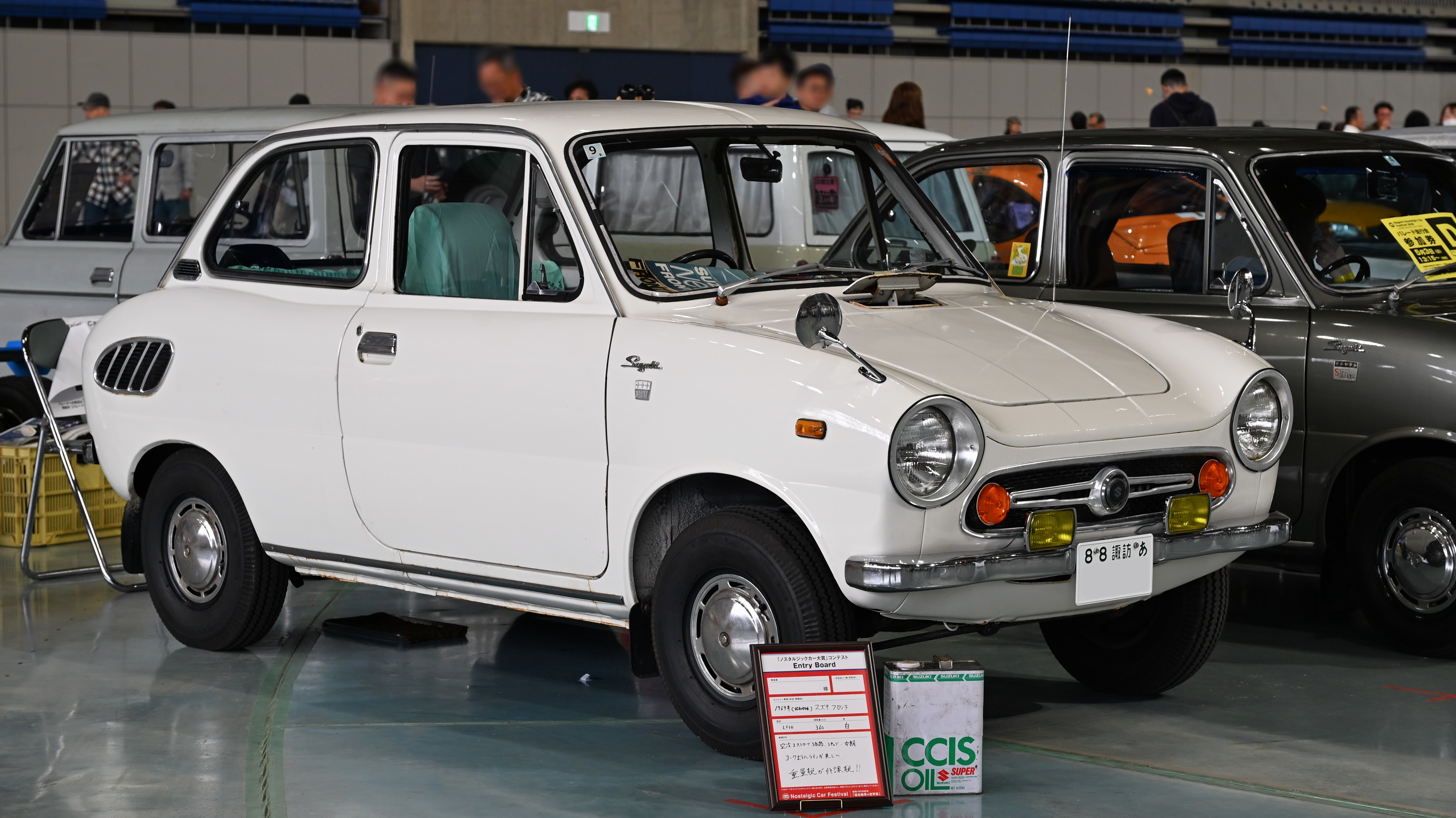
- 1969 Suzuki Fronte Deluxe

Overview
- Manufacturer: Suzuki
- Also called: Suzuki Alto
- Production: 1962 – 1989

Body and chassis
- Class: Kei car

Chronology
- Successor: Suzuki Alto

The Suzuki Fronte (Japanese: スズキ・フロンテ) is an automobile introduced in March 1962 as a sedan version of the Suzulight Van. The nameplate remained in use for Suzuki's Kei car sedans as well as some commercial-use derivatives until it was replaced by the Alto (originally only used for commercial vehicles) in September 1988.

The "fronte" nameplate initially alluded to the fact that the initial Fronte was front-wheel-drive, but during the years when the Fronte was rear-engined, rear-wheel-drive, Suzuki stated that it referred to their aim of being at the front of the Kei class.

== Suzulight Fronte (TLA/FEA) ==
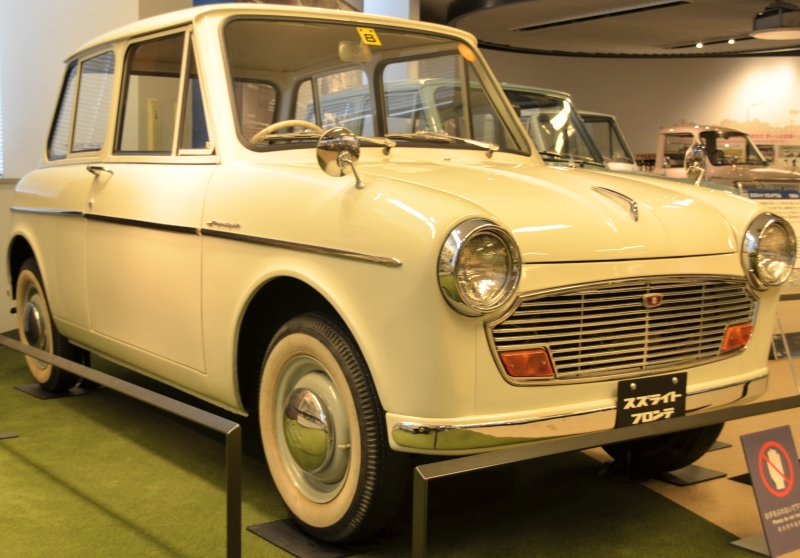
Suzulight Fronte TLA (1962–63)

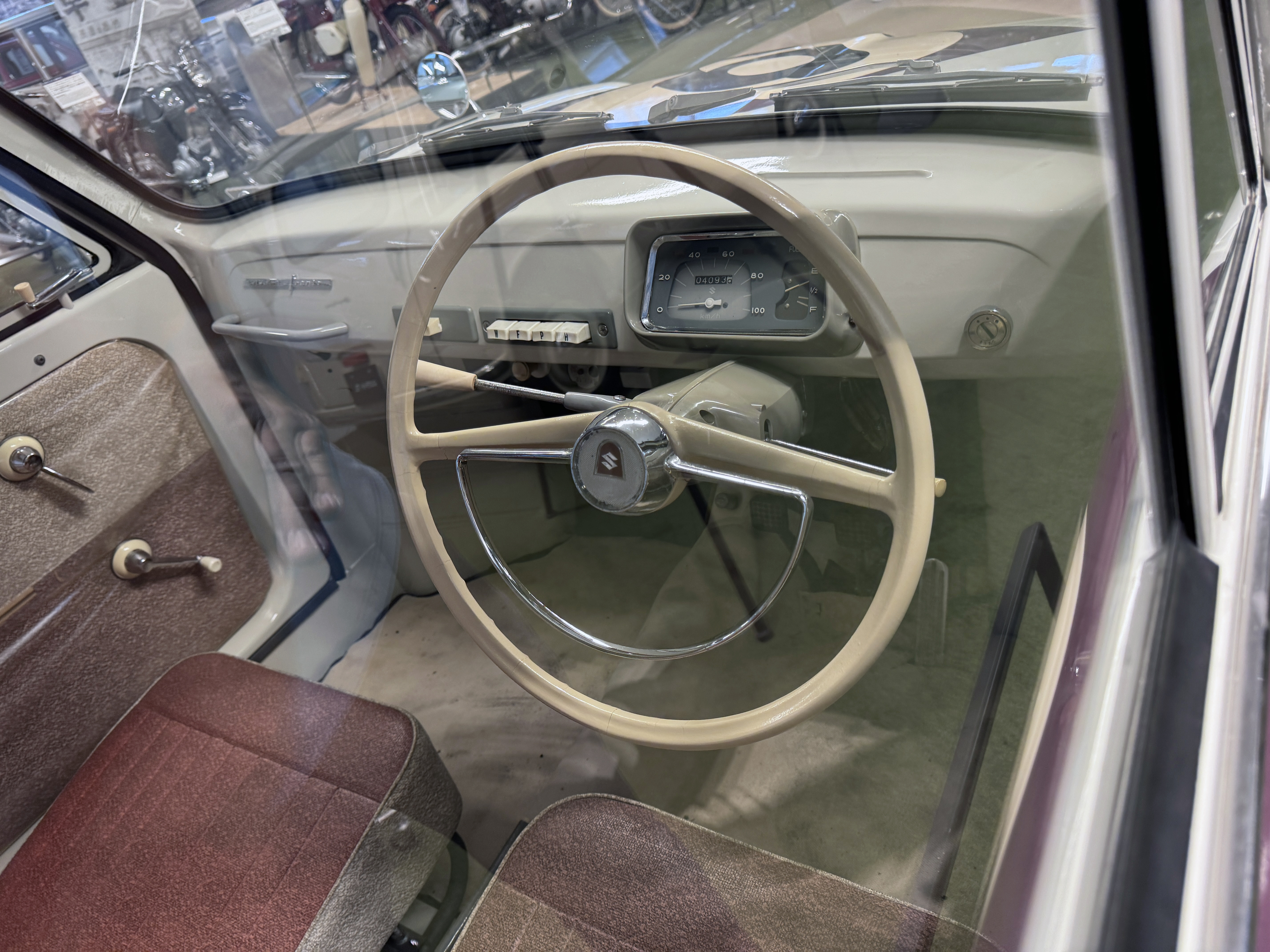
Interior (Fronte TLA)

The Suzulight Van-based TLA Fronte was introduced in March 1962 as a passenger car version of the popular light van. Built at Takatsuka Assembly in Hamamatsu, the Suzulight Fronte was based on the earlier Suzulight SS series, itself a fairly straightforward copy of the even older Lloyd LP400, and as such had a transversely mounted two-cylinder, two-stroke engine driving the front wheels. Suspension was independent on all four wheels, with transverse double leafsprings on both axes. 2,565 were built in the first year. Power was 25 PS (18 kW) at 6000 rpm, from a unique engine (also called "TLA") with its cylinders cast separately rather than in a single block. Of 360 cc (64.0 × 56.0 mm) this method allowed for a lower production cost and better cooling, allowing Suzuki to price the TLA below the more spartan TL Van. As with the light commercials on which it was based, the transmission was a three-speed manual with an unsynchronized first gear and a column-mounted shifter.

The TLA engine had problems with seizing after prolonged use of high revs and after only one year's production, it was replaced by the new FEA engine. This also featured the SELMIX automatic lubrication system, improved fuel economy and eliminated the need for pre-mixed petrol for the two-stroke engine. Power was down somewhat, to 21 PS (15 kW). This was counteracted by the installation of a new, all-synchronized four-speed gearbox.

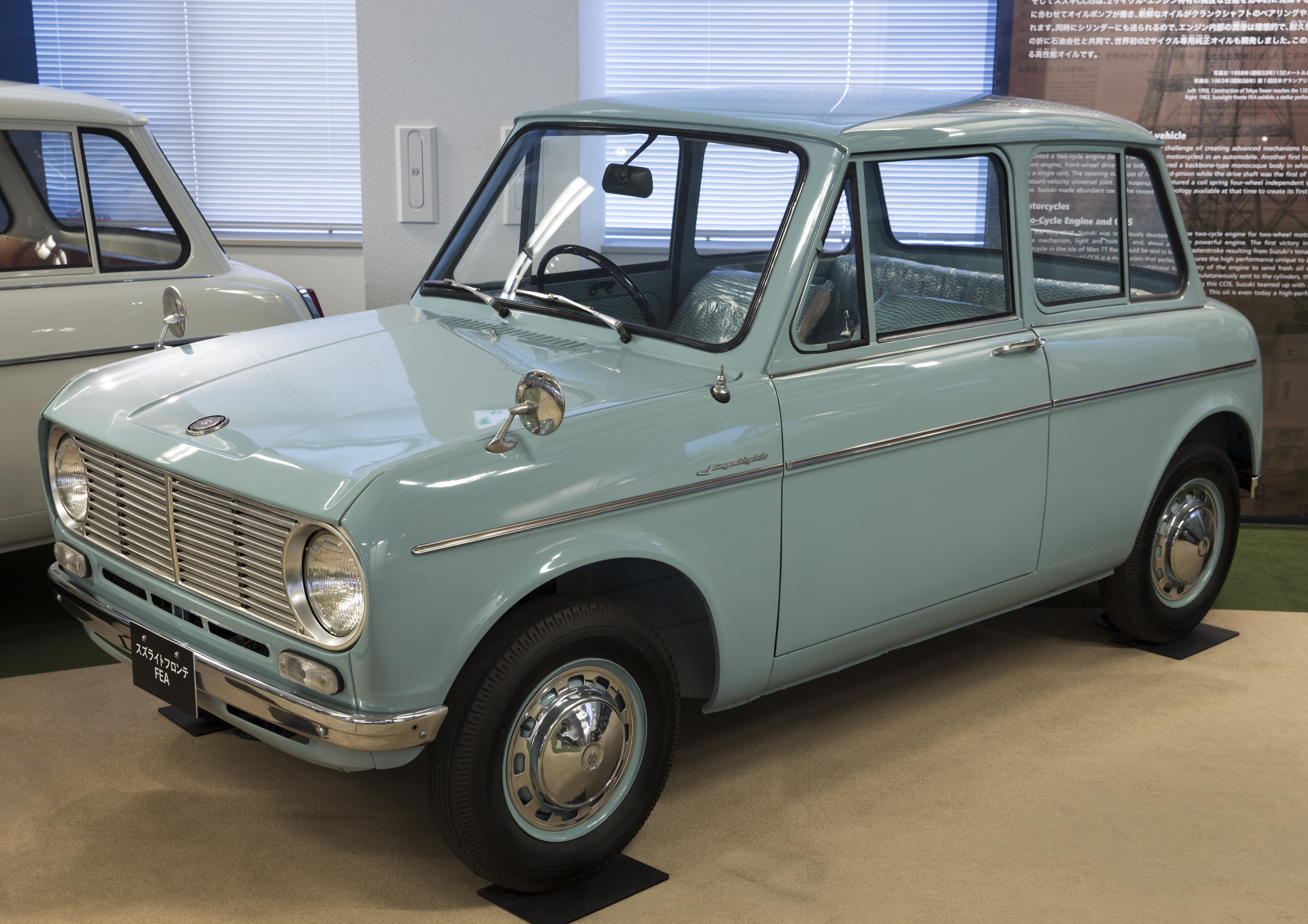
1965 Suzulight Fronte FEA-II; this facelift model predated the Mini Clubman by nearly four years

In May 1963, two of the recently introduced FE-powered Suzuki Frontes came in first and second in their class at the inaugural Japanese Grand Prix (Class C1, for engines with less than 400 cc), with an average speed of 89.763 km/h (55.776 mph). Two more Frontes came in fourth and eighth places. The winning driver was Osamu Mochizuki (望月 修) who crossed the finish line just ahead of teammate Haruhisa Fujita (藤田 晴久), both a full minute ahead of the third-placed Subaru 360. The fastest lap was also made by a Fronte, by eighth-place finisher Isamu Kawashima, who managed a lap speed of 90.72 km/h (56.37 mph) around the 6 km (3.7 mi) course.

In October 1965 the further improved CCI engine (Cylinder Crank Injection), which further cut down oil consumption and startup smoke. The FEA-II engine also gained an extra horsepower, for a total of 22. The FEA-II also received a new front-end treatment, aping its bigger brother the Fronte 800. Production was about 150 cars per month at this time (2,101 Frontes had been built in 1963), very low compared to the 2,000 or so Subaru 360 built monthly. In 1966 this became known as the "New FEA" after another slight facelift which included a new dashboard. By the end of its production run (1967), the Suzulight Fronte was beginning to look rather dated, especially at the rear end, and the chassis was positively archaic.

== Fronte 360 (LC10) ==
Fronte 360 sedan
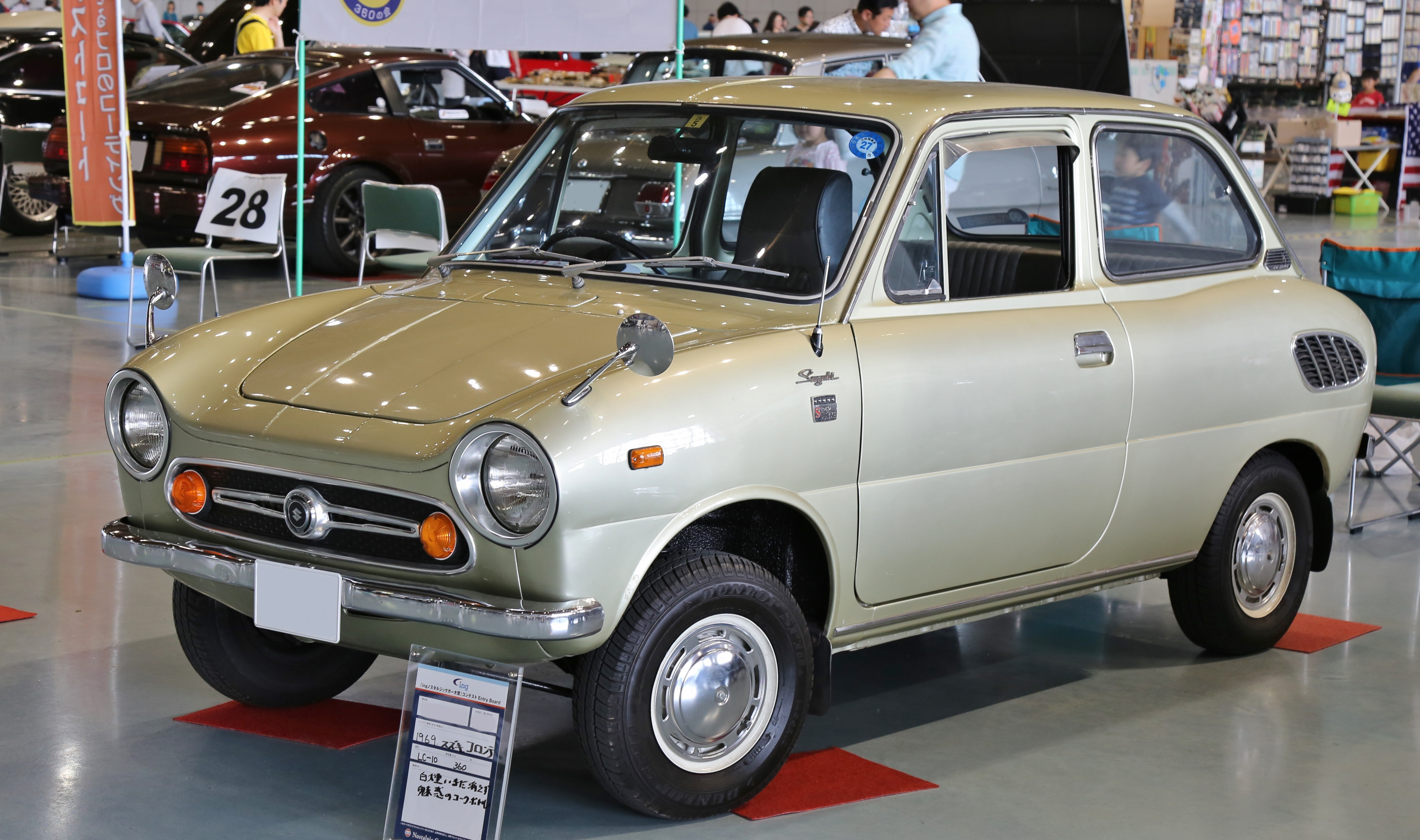

Overview
- Production: March 1967–October 1970
- Assembly: Kosai Assembly Plant, Hamana-gun, Shizuoka, Japan

Body and chassis
- Body style: 2-door sedan
- Layout: RR layout

Powertrain
- Engine: 356 cc LC10 two-stroke I3; 475 cc LC50 two-stroke I3 (export only)
- Transmission: 4-speed manual

Dimensions
- Wheelbase: 1,960 mm (77.2 in)
- Length: 2,995 mm (117.9 in)
- Width: 1,295 mm (51.0 in)
- Height: 1,290 mm (50.8 in)
- Curb weight: 425 kg (937 lb)

The Suzuki Fronte 360 two-door sedan (chassis code LC10) was introduced in March 1967 to replace the earlier Suzulight Fronte. The "Y-16", as the project had been known, had a rear engine and ten inch wheels for maximum packaging. The car sprang from the 1961 "FC" project, also with a rear-engine but with rear-hinged doors, a reverse-angle rear window (à la the Ford Anglia) and an overall rakish profile. This earlier stillborn project, called the "Suzulight Sports 360", was a reaction to the success of the rear-engined Subaru 360 and had a unique 360 cc two-cylinder engine. Even earlier (1960), there was an open two-seater prototype called the FA, with the same engine and layout as used in the FC. Suzuki's new test track in Ryūyō was put to intense use for the development program, while tropical and cold weather testing was carried out in Thailand and on Hokkaido respectively. In the Japanese domestic market, the Fronte competed directly with the Mitsubishi Minica, Honda N360, Daihatsu Fellow, and the Subaru 360.

Its overall shape is of a roundish profile, soon nicknamed "Daruma" for a Japanese roly-poly doll - this is the smallest (and arguably the only Kei Jidosha) car to use the "coke bottle styling" which became popular in the United States in the mid-1960s. The wheelbase was 1,960 mm (77.2 in), the suspension independent with coil springs and the engine was an all new 356 cc three-cylinder air-cooled two-cycle unit which was also called the LC10. The transmission was a four-speed manual, originally with synchromesh on the top three gears only. The rear lights and the front indicators used the same lenses, only of different colours. In a break with Fronte's front-wheel drive traditions, the powertrain was placed transversely in the rear, as was becoming the norm for kei cars of the period. The LC10 Fronte was dubbed the "Queen of the keis" by Suzuki's marketing department - a claim which may have influenced Subaru to name their 360 replacement the "Rex".

The LC10 was introduced with great fanfare and a large marketing campaign, which included television commercials. First reaching dealerships on 27 May 1967, market response was immediate and strong. While the original target production was 3000 per month, this was soon nearly tripled. Monthly production remained above 8000 until the end of the LC10's life. A new, additional factory in Iwata was opened in August 1967 to add supplementary capacity. As production ramped up, minor running changes were made: little details like the shape of the turn signal lights were changed, while the chrome windshield surround was made thinner a few months into production; early Deluxe and Super Deluxe models also received clear headlight covers but later these were reserved for the sporty variants. The Fronte soon received a very minor update reflecting stricter safety laws; as of October 1968 it sported a driver's side integrated headrest, seat belts up front, and turn signal flashers on all four corners.

While in overall a fairly simple and light car, the triple carburettors were awkwardly located at the front of the engine, behind the rear seat. To adjust them, a mechanic would have to reach through a small egg-shaped opening from the rear seat. Another complaint touched on the car's near absence of luggage space. There was even a brochure made of a US-market Fronte 360, complete with miles-per-hour speedo and uncovered sealed-beam headlights, but most likely none were brought over.

In November 1968 came the Suzuki Fronte SS 360 with 36 PS (26 kW), with the sportier yet Suzuki Fronte SSS following in April 1970. The SS was the quickest kei-car yet, managing to break the twenty second barrier in reaching 400 metres from standing with 19.95 seconds. The car had different wheels and also featured a rev counter. It was introduced with an unusual marketing stunt: racing driver Stirling Moss and TT-winning motorcycle racer Mitsuo Itoh were engaged to drive two SS Frontes (one red, one pale yellow) on a high-speed demonstration journey along Italy's 750 km (466 mi) Autostrada del Sole leading from Milan to Napoli. In the end, the average speed attained was 122.44 km/h (76.08 mph), respectable for a car with an engine smaller than those of most motorcycles. The original car currently resides in Suzuki's museum in Hamamatsu. In 1969 the "SS Standard" model also appeared, with the powerful engine but with a minimum of trim, specifically intended for competition purposes.

There was also an export version introduced in January 1969, the Suzuki Fronte 500 with the engine enlarged to 475 cc. This was only built in De Luxe trim. The 500 produces 29 PS (21 kW) at 6000 rpm, four more than does the original 360 export version. In May 1969 the Fronte received its first real facelift. The dashboard was modernized by two square gauges instead of a large oval one, the ignition key was moved from the dashboard to the steering column and the two-tone interior was changed to simply black. Externally, the decorative trim pieces in the front grille and on the air inlets at the rear were replaced by real grilles. First gear was also synchronized, unlike on earlier cars. In July 1969 the Fronte S appeared, which offered the SS equipment but with the more economical 25 PS engine. Another facelift took place in April 1970, when the grille became more ornate and the sporting version was rebaptized "SSS". Marketing materials referred to this version as the "New Fronte". Two new engines of 31 and 34 PS (23 and 25 kW) were installed, while the original 25 PS version was discontinued. The more powerful version was installed in the Hi-Super DX and S versions. Production ended in October 1970, in advance of the succeeding "Stingray" Fronte.

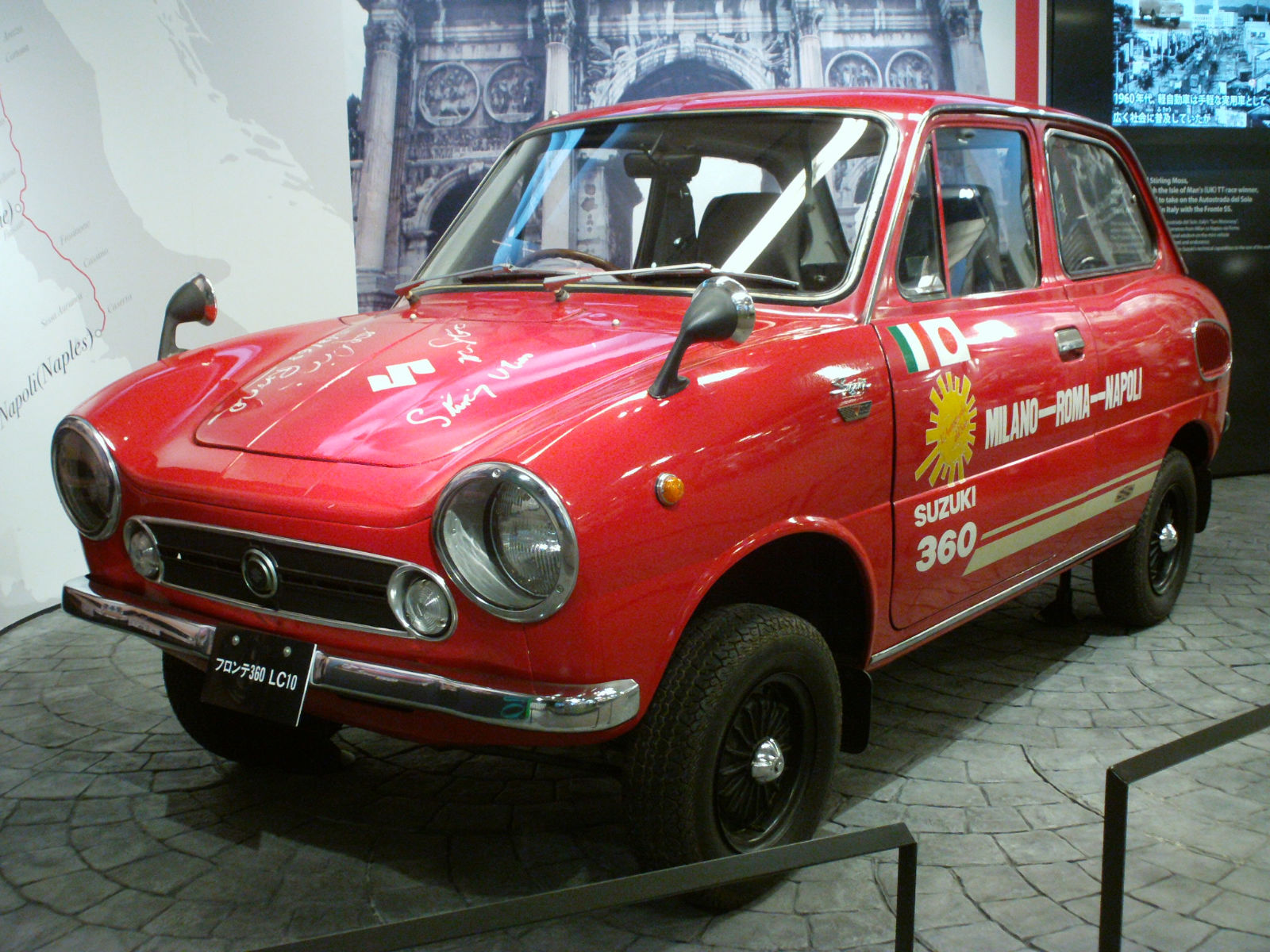
The 1968 Fronte SS 360 driven by Stirling Moss

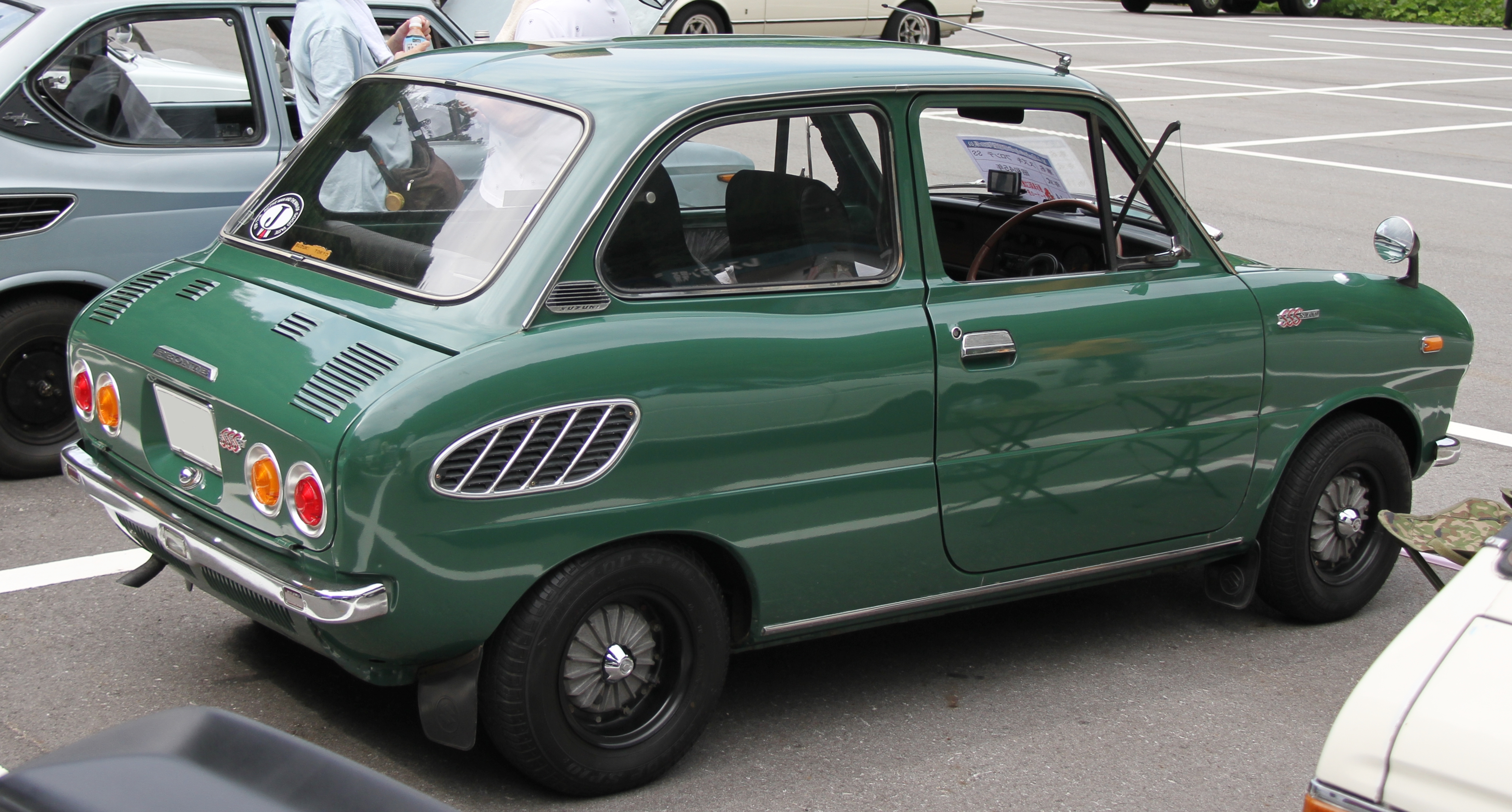
1970 Suzuki Fronte SSS (rear)

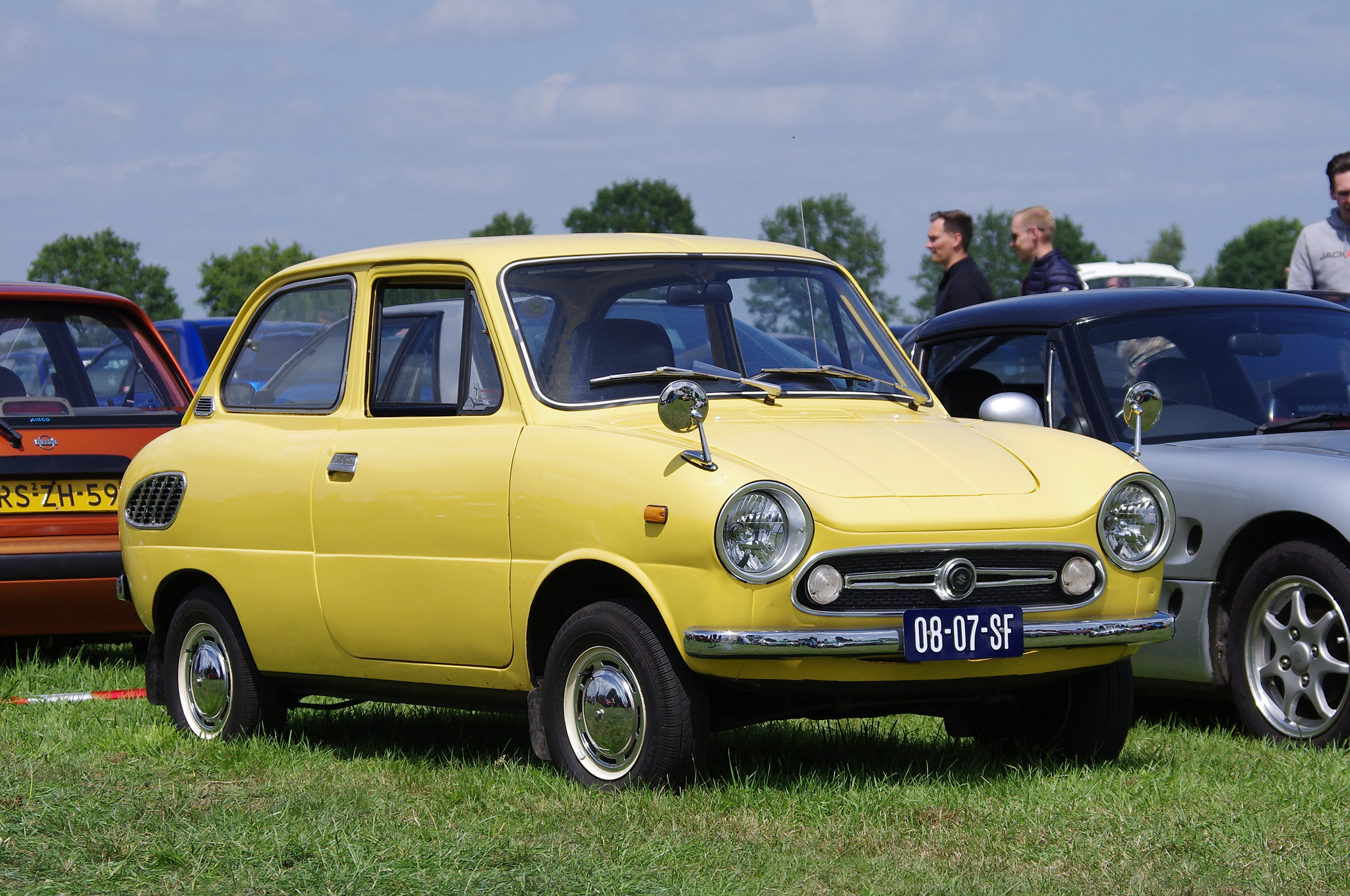
Suzuki 500 Deluxe (Netherlands, export version with left-hand drive)

== Fronte Van/Estate/Custom (LS10/LS20) ==
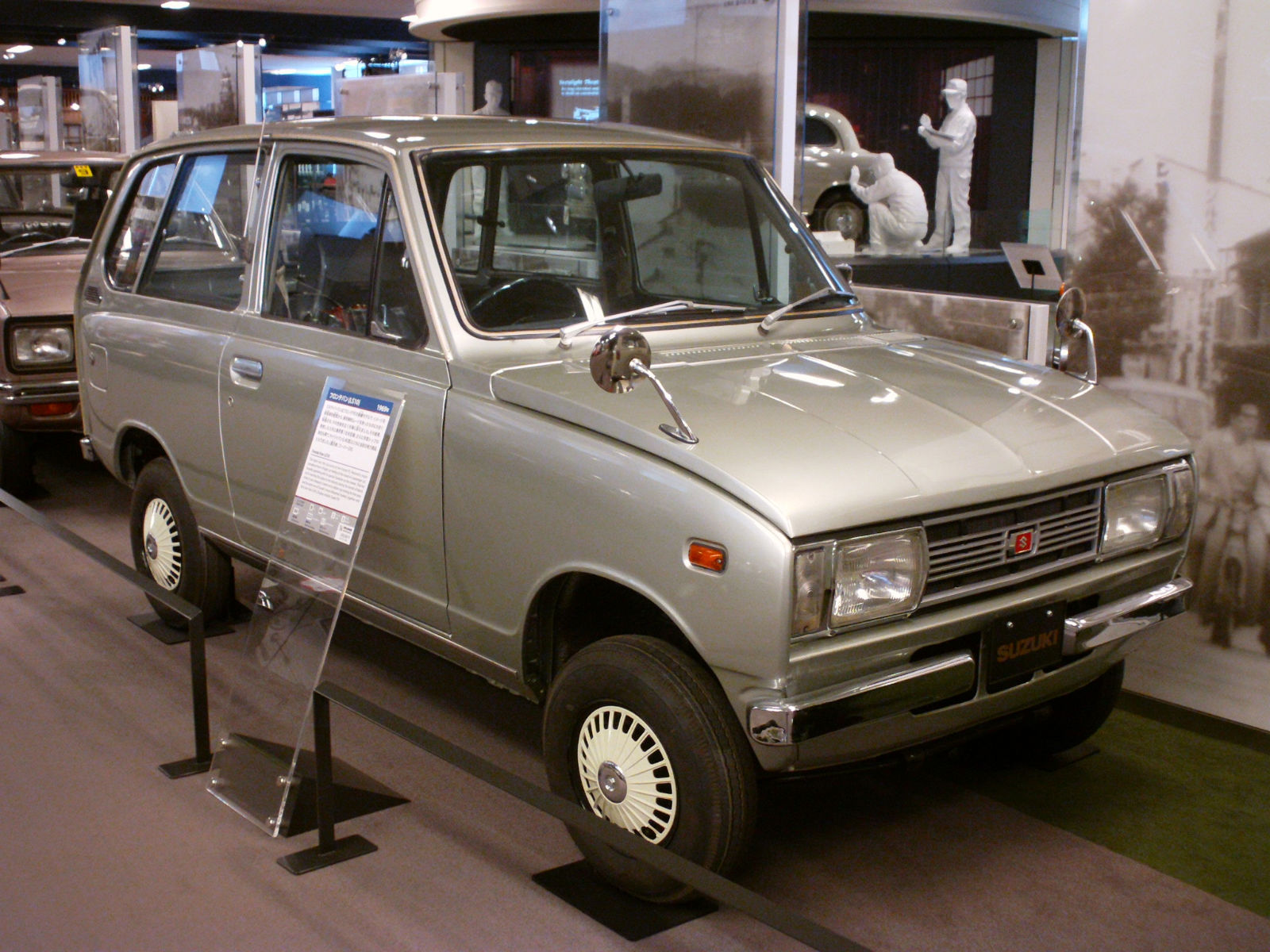
1969 LS10 Fronte Van

January 1969 saw the arrival of the Suzuki Fronte Van three-door wagon (LS10) as a successor to the Suzulight FE-series Van which had been built alongside the LC10 for a couple of years. The LS10 featured a conventional drivetrain lay-out (engine in front, rear wheel drive), a rear rigid axle with leaf springs and a wheelbase of 1,995 mm (78.5 in). Design was square in style, radically different from the Fronte sedan. To begin with, the rear opening was a single unit, hinged at the top. The engine was the air-cooled 356 cc LC10 two-cycle three-cylinder unit, here detuned to 25 PS (18 kW) for a top speed of 105 km/h (65 mph). The Van (and its subsequent siblings) has MacPherson struts in front and semi-elliptic leaf springs in rear. Unusually for Japanese cars, the spare wheel was mounted in the engine compartment - something more commonly seen in French cars - to help free up more space for luggage.

By July 1969 a three-door wagon version intended for private use arrived, the LS11 Suzuki Fronte Estate, to give passenger car buyers a model with more luggage room without the indignity of having to buy a commercial vehicle. The Estate had the same top-hinged rear opening, but featured a more comfortable, while still folding, rear seat. There was also a folding luggage shelf in the trunk. Sops to safety, already somewhat better than the regular Fronte because of the engine location and the driver's seat being located farther back, included an anti-glare dashboard and a round horn pad in the steering wheel.

Data table (expands)
Suzuki Fronte Van/Estate/Custom
	'69 Fronte Van (LS10)	'72 Fronte Van (LS20)	'69 Fronte Estate (LS11)	'70 Fronte Hi-Custom (LS11)
Body	3-door wagon (commercial)		3-door wagon (passenger car)	2-door sedan (passenger car)
Transmission	FR, 4-speed manual			
Suspension F/R	coil springs / leaf sprung live axle			
Brakes F/R	drums / drums			
Wheelbase	1,995 mm (78.5 in)			
Length/width/height	2995/1295/1380 mm 117.9/51.0/54.3 in			
Empty weight	500 kg (1,102 lb); Super DeLuxe: 505 kg (1,113 lb)	505 kg (1,113 lb); Super DeLuxe: 510 kg (1,124 lb)	500 kg (1,102 lb)	
Engine	LC10 air-cooled, 2-stroke inline 3	L50 water-cooled, 2-stroke inline 2	LC10 air-cooled, 2-stroke inline 3	
Displacement	356 cc (52.0 x 56.0mm)	359 cc (61.0 x 61.5mm)	356 cc (52.0 x 56.0mm)	
Carburetor	1 downdraught single-barrel			
Power (SAE)	25 PS (18 kW) at 6500 rpm	28 PS (21 kW) at 5500 rpm	25 PS (18 kW) at 6500 rpm	30 PS (22 kW) at 6500 rpm
Torque	3.2 kg⋅m (31 N⋅m; 23 lb⋅ft) at 5000 rpm	3.8 kg⋅m (37 N⋅m; 27 lb⋅ft) at 5000 rpm	3.2 kg⋅m (31 N⋅m; 23 lb⋅ft) at 5000 rpm	3.7 kg⋅m (36 N⋅m; 27 lb⋅ft) at 5500 rpm
Top Speed	105 km/h (65 mph)		105 km/h (65 mph)	110 km/h (68 mph)
Payload	300 kg (660 lb); Or 150 kg with 4 occupants		n/a	
Tires	4.50 x 10 4PR		4.80 x 10 2PR	
Introductory price	Standard: ¥313,000; DeLuxe: ¥340,000; Super DeLuxe: ¥368,000		¥372,000	¥394,000

In June 1970 the Estate model was succeeded by the Suzuki Fronte Custom, also using the LS11 model code. The Custom had the same wagon body style but lacked a top opening at the rear. While it received a new grille it came with a downwards opening trunk lid only, possibly to please the private customer who found the luggage room in the rear-engined Fronte too small by disguising the fact that a wagon (not popular in Japan in those days) was involved. Thus, the Fronte Custom became one of only two wagons ever without a bottom to top back opening, the other being the 1941-1942 Chrysler Town and Country (the Austin A40 Farina had a similar layout but was marketed as a sedan in that form). A more luxurious and powerful (30 PS [22 kW], 110 km/h) Hi-Custom version was added two months later, but the entire Custom range was deleted in February 1971. A total of 5,719 LS11s were built (Estate, Custom, and Hi-Custom), with seven eighths of the total having been built in calendar year 1970. Also in 1971 the Fronte Van received a minor facelift (called "Fresh New Fronte Van" in period marketing material), including a somewhat baroque new grille and a new, horizontally divided two-piece tailgate. The twin round taillights were also replaced by rectangular units. This version also featured Suzuki's new self-lubricating "CCIS" system (Cylinder Crank Injection and Selmix).

In March 1972 the Fronte Van received the two-cylinder, two-stroke water-cooled, 28 PS (21 kW) L50 engine also used in the Suzuki Carry, becoming the LS20 in the process. A new grille gave away the changes underneath the skin, as did prominent "Water Cooled" badges on the rear. Aside from the engine, the most important change was that the rear lid was now once again a top-hinged single-piece unit. As before, Standard, DeLuxe, and Super DeLuxe versions were available. The Fronte Van was replaced in April 1973 by the strange-looking Fronte Hatch. Just under 28,000 of the LS20 Van were built in the thirteen months it was in production.

== Sting Ray Fronte (LC10II/LC10W) ==
Suzuki Fronte LC10W

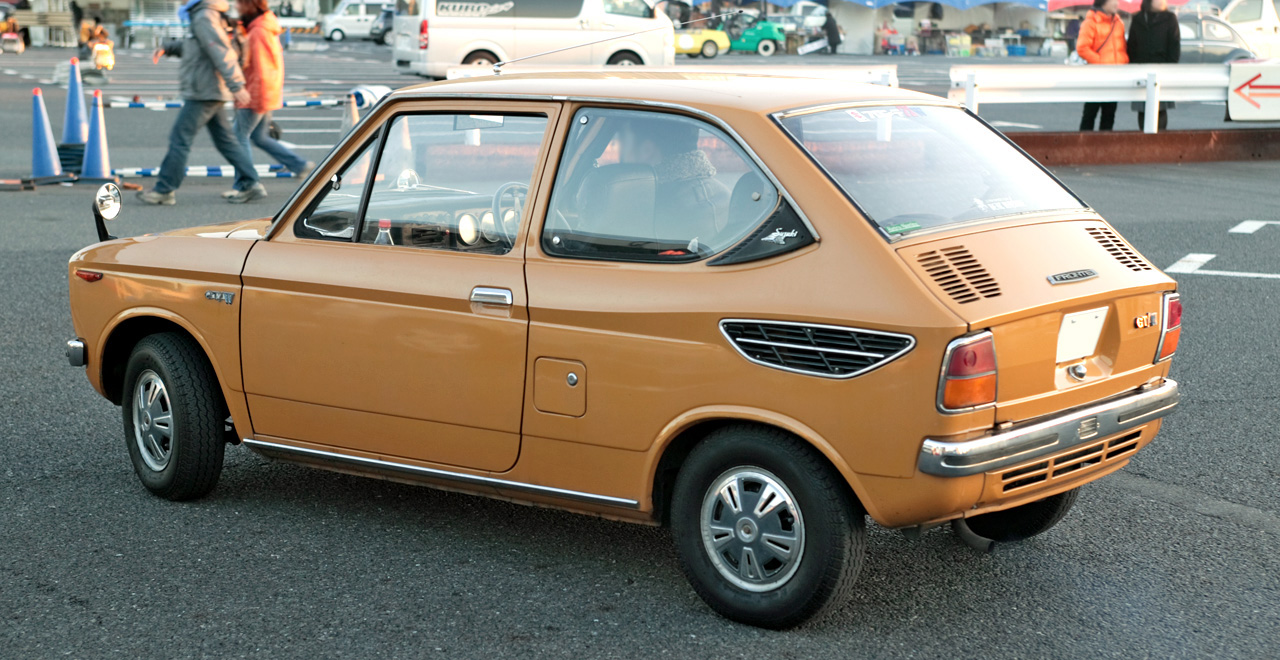
Fronte 71 GT/W

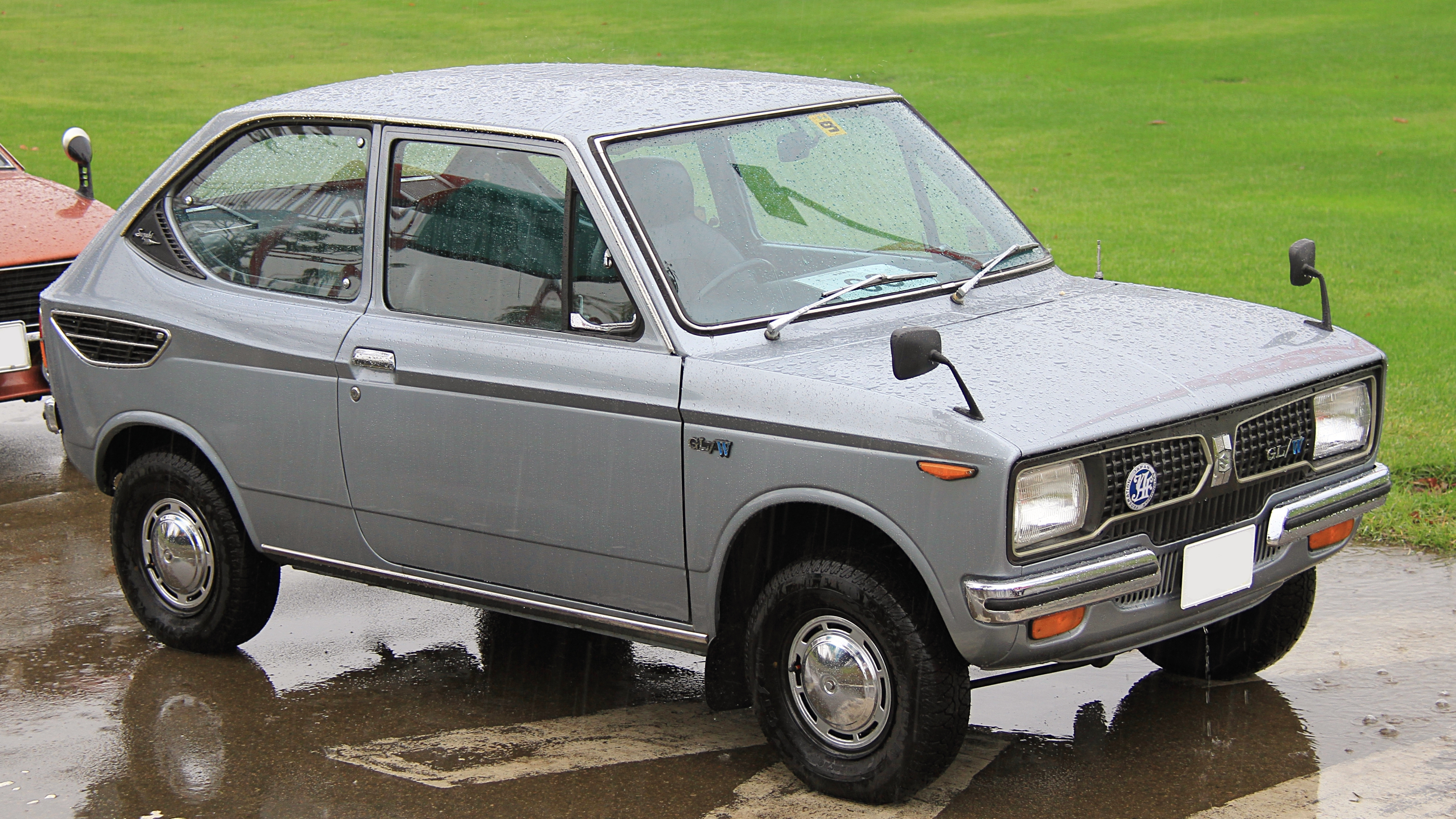
Fronte 72 GL/W

In November 1970, the third generation Suzuki Fronte 71 (LC10 II) two-door sedan was introduced. Its aggressive design was commonly referred to as the "Sting Ray Look". The rear-engined chassis design and engine remained the same as its predecessor the LC10, although with a slightly longer 2,010 mm (79.1 in) wheelbase. Other minor chassis differences were the addition of a front anti-roll bar and the change to a semi-trailing arm rear suspension layout. There were 31, 34 or 36 PS versions available, the lineup being topped by the S, SS, SSS and SSS-R (the letter "R" merely indicating the fitment of radial tires) versions.

As of May 1971 a water-cooled version, the LC10W, became available in either GL-W (34 PS) or 37 PS GT-W/GTR-W ("R" again meaning radial tires) versions. The lineup grew to 12 models, with five different engines. Aside from being water-cooled, the engine was also updated with reed valves for increased low-down torque, while the noisy cooling fan was eliminated in favor of a dual radiator system (with a small radiator fan). The main radiator was mounted up front, which also marginally improved theweight distribution. The success of the water-cooled models led Suzuki to quickly introduce further versions, with the lesser GO-W and GS-W models (also with 34 PS) appearing two months later.

Fronte 71 Data table (expands)
Suzuki Fronte 71
	Standard	Super DeLuxe	Hi-Super	S	SSS	SSS-R
Transmission	Rear-engine, rear-wheel drive layout, 4-speed manual					
Suspension F/R	coil springs and wishbones / coil springs and trailing arms					
Brakes F/R	drums / drums					
Wheelbase	2,010 mm (79.1 in)					
Length/width	2995/1295 mm (117.9/51.0 in)					
Height	1,295 mm (51.0 in)			1,260 mm (49.6 in)		1,250 mm (49.2 in)
Empty weight	460 kg (1,014 lb)		465 kg (1,025 lb)	460 kg (1,014 lb)		
Engine	LC10 air-cooled 2-stroke inline 3, CCI lubrication					
Displacement	356 cc (52.0 x 56.0mm)					
Carburetor	3 single-barrel					
Power (SAE)	31 PS (23 kW) at 6,000 rpm		34 PS (25 kW) at 6,500 rpm		36 PS (26 kW) at 7,000 rpm	
Torque	3.7 kg⋅m (36 N⋅m; 27 lb⋅ft) at 5,000 rpm		3.7 kg⋅m (36 N⋅m; 27 lb⋅ft) at 5,500 rpm		3.7 kg⋅m (36 N⋅m; 27 lb⋅ft) at 6,500 rpm	
Top Speed	115 km/h (71 mph)		120 km/h (75 mph)			
Acceleration (0→400m)	21.5 sec		20.5 sec		19.9 sec	
Tires	5.20 x 10 4PR					135 SR10

By November 1971, after a minor facelift including a new grille, the cars were called Suzuki Fronte 72. The sporty air-cooled engines were dropped as the more refined water-cooled units became more and more popular, except in the very lowest end of the market. In March 1972, water-cooled GD-W (deLuxe) and GU-W (standard) were added. In export markets, there was the Suzuki Fronte 500 with the 475 cc LC50 engine, also marketed as the Suzuki LC50 (29 PS, 115 km/h). In October 1972 the Fronte 72 was replaced by the "New Fronte" (with a revised fascia and bonnet). By this time, only the Standard model ("U") retained the air-cooled engine, with an available automatic clutch. The top-of-the-line "GT-W Type II" came equipped with front disc brakes, as did its sister model the Fronte Coupé GXCF.

New Fronte Data table (expands)
Suzuki New Fronte
	Air-cooled Series		Family Series		Gorgeous Series		Sports Series	
	Standard; LC10IIU	Autoclutch; LC10IIUA	GU-W; LC10WGU	GD-W; LC10WGD	GF-W; LC10WGF	GC-W; LC10WGC	GT-W; LC10WGT	GT-W typeII; LC10WGT-B
Transmission	Rear-engine, rear-wheel drive layout, 4-speed manual							
Suspension F/R	coil springs and wishbones / coil springs and trailing arms							
Brakes F/R	drums / drums							discs / drums
Wheelbase	2,010 mm (79.1 in)							
Length/width/height	2,995/1,295/1,295 mm (117.9/51.0/51.0 in)						2,995/1,295/1,260 mm (117.9/51.0/49.6 in)	
Empty weight	460 kg (1,014 lb)		475 kg (1,047 lb)					495 kg (1,091 lb)
Engine	LC10 air-cooled 2-stroke inline 3, CCIS lubrication		LC10W water-cooled 2-stroke inline 3, CCIS lubrication					
Displacement	356 cc (52.0 x 56.0mm)							
Carburetor	3 single-barrel Mikuni		single-barrel Solex		3 single-barrel Mikuni			
Power (SAE)	31 PS (23 kW) at 6,000 rpm				34 PS (25 kW) at 6,000 rpm		37 PS (27 kW) at 6,500 rpm	
Torque	3.7 kg⋅m (36 N⋅m; 27 lb⋅ft) at 5,000 rpm		4.0 kg⋅m (39 N⋅m; 29 lb⋅ft) at 4,500 rpm		4.2 kg⋅m (41 N⋅m; 30 lb⋅ft) at 4,500 rpm			
Top Speed	115 km/h (71 mph)				120 km/h (75 mph)			
Acceleration (0→400m)	21.5 sec		21.6 sec		20.2 sec		19.67 sec	
Tires	5.20 x 10 4PR							

=== Fronte Coupé (LC10W) ===
Suzuki Fronte Coupé
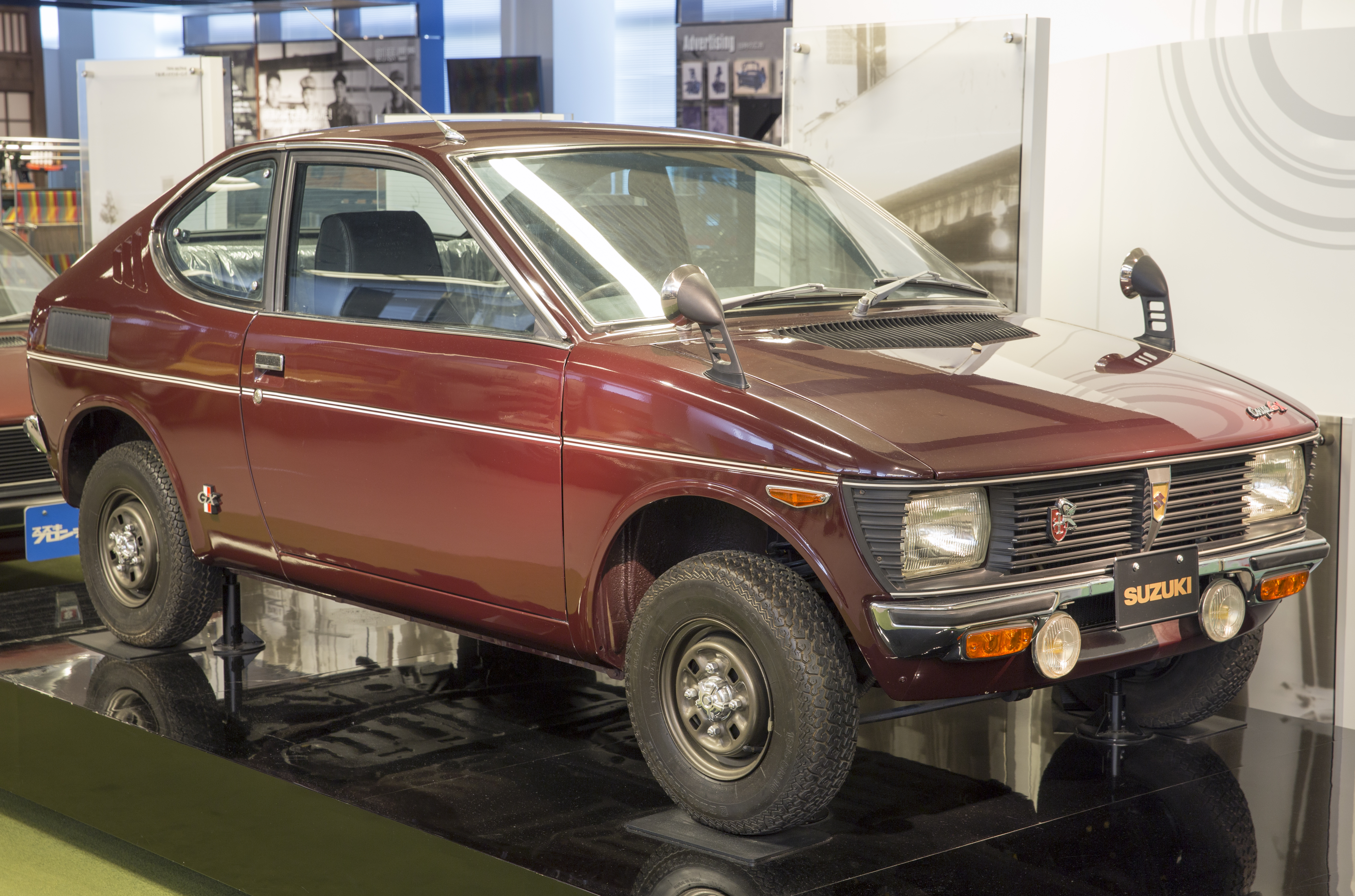
- Fronte Coupé GXCF

Overview
- Model code: LC10W
- Model years: 1971-1976
- Designer: Giorgetto Giugiaro

Body and chassis
- Layout: Rear engine, rear wheel drive

Powertrain
- Engine: 356 cc LC10W two-stroke I3

Dimensions
- Wheelbase: 2,010 mm (79.1 in)
- Length: 2,995 mm (117.9 in)
- Width: 1,295 mm (51.0 in)
- Height: 1,195 mm (47.0 in)
- Curb weight: 500 kg (1,102 lb)

Chronology
- Successor: Suzuki Cervo

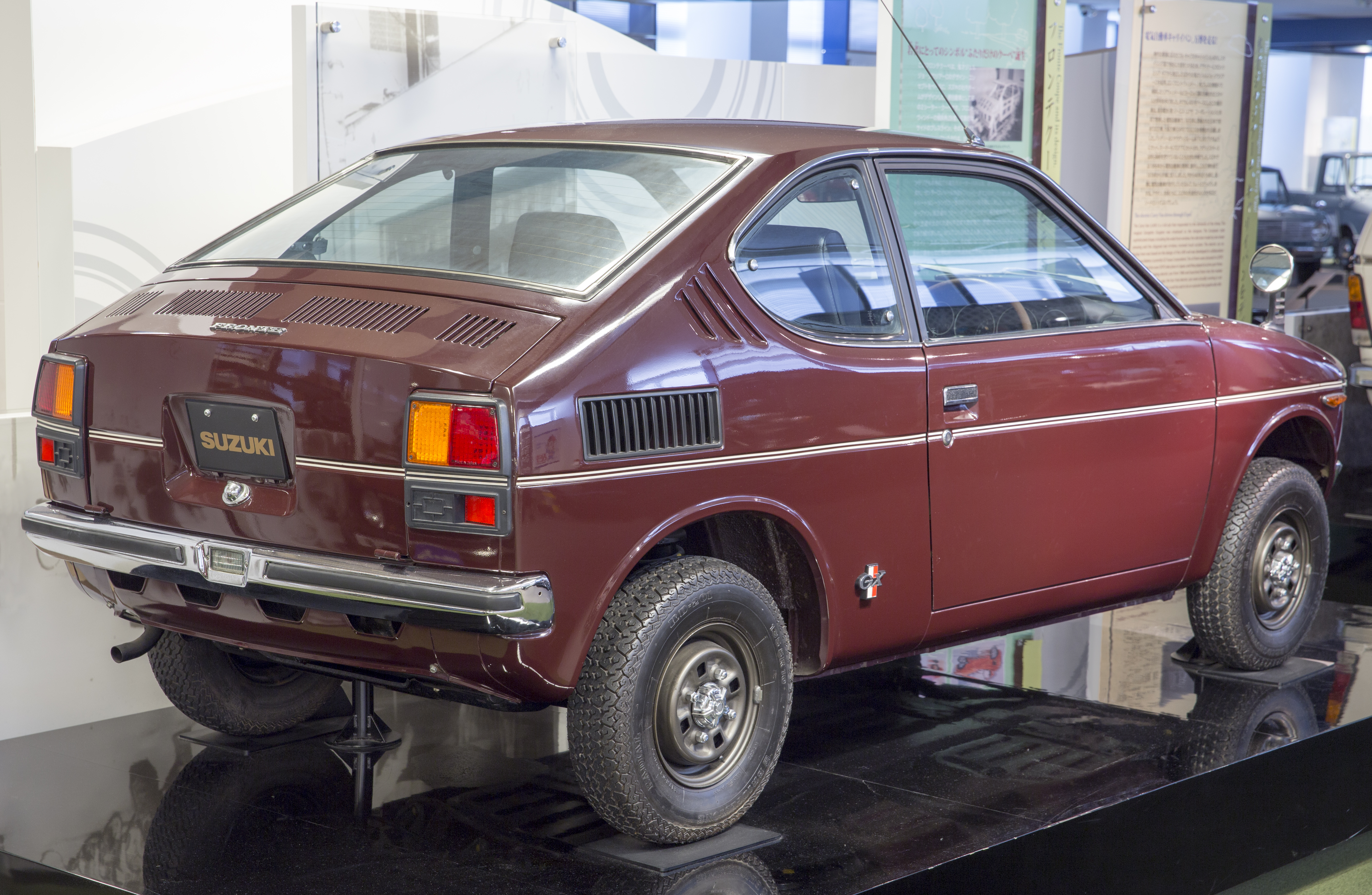
Fronte Coupé GXCF (LC10W; rear view)

In September 1971 the seminal, Giugiaro-designed Fronte Coupé arrived, the predecessor to the well known Cervo range. Giugiaro's original concept was a revised version of the one-box design he had already used for the "Rowan Elettrica" city car of 1967. Suzuki then modified the design considerably, changing the proportions and adding ornamentation. Based on the Stingray "LC10 II" model, the Fronte Coupé was only ever offered with the water-cooled, rear-mounted LC10W engine. While initially only available as a two-seater, these were gradually replaced by four-seater versions. At first only two versions were available, the regular GE and the luxurious GX (or GER/GXR for models fitted with radial tires), both with a 37 PS (27 kW) version of the LC10W. Model changes:

- February 1972 – GXF, four-seater 2+2 added. "F" signifies four seats.
- March 1972 – 34 PS (25 kW), less equipped 2+2 GXPF added.
- June 1972 – Base 31 PS (23 kW) GAF version introduced (¥399,000). The GAF has painted bumpers and no spotlights in front, as well as chromed hubcaps rather than the sportier wheels of the better equipped models. Inside the centre console was deleted, as were several gauges, and a more pedestrian two-spoke steering wheel replaced the original sportier looking three-spoked unit. The top of the line GXCF also appeared at the same time, equipped with front disc brakes, and the lower-cost, radial tire equipped GER.
- October 1972 – Two-seater versions discontinued.
- May 1974 – Only a 35 PS (26 kW) engine now available, due to new emissions rules. All models aside from the GXF and GXCF were discontinued.
- January 1975 – the engine lid and front bumper was modified to accommodate the new, larger license plates used on kei cars.
- June 1976 – Discontinued. In October 1977 the Cervo replacement arrived.

The Fronte Coupé was simply referred to as the Suzuki LC10W in export markets, where it received a 35 PS (26 kW) 356 cc engine. The Fronte Coupé was resurrected in a revised and larger form as the Suzuki Cervo in October 1977, after Kei car regulations were changed in January 1976.

== Fronte LC20 ==
In July 1973 the New Fronte became the old Fronte as it was replaced by the new LC20. Its very rounded "Oval Shell" design was a radical departure from its predecessor, very much in the style of the 1970 Datsun Cherry E10. The underpinnings remained largely the same, however, retaining the water-cooled engines and suspension from the LC10 with a 20 mm longer wheelbase (2030 mm). Overall dimensions, dictated by the kei-car regulations, remained 2995×1295 mm. The air-cooled engines were discontinued, but the engine code remained LC10W - with the "W" denoting water-cooling. The radiator is mounted up front. The bumpers were very small, no more than trim pieces. A strange and sour-looking front gave way to an ovoid rear end, culminating in an engine cover perforated by at least 50 vent openings. On the rear fenders two louvered vents allow air to the engine compartment; the right-hand one also opens to allow access to the fuel filler. Finally, a frameless opening rear glass provides a measure of hatchback practicality.

A big first for Suzuki was the availability of a four-door version, lagging behind competing offerings from Daihatsu, Subaru, and Honda. Between the two engines, two bodystyles and several different equipment levels, a confusingly large lineup was on offer: two-door GU, GD, GH, GC, GT, GT type II, and four-door FU, FD, FH, FC, FT. In July 1974 the 37 hp GT engine was downgraded to 35 PS, while the 34 PS version was replaced by a 32 PS unit. The lowest powered 32 and 34 PS models had single Solex carburetors rather than the triple units used on more powerful models.

On the original version, the bumpers and the vent panels on the sides were painted a light gun metal color; from 1974 on these were all body color. In 1974, the rear bumper was also revised as higher end models received a full-width chrome trim piece across the top, rather than the two vestigial chrome pieces used on the original design. Later yet, the range was rationalized and the models renamed Standard, Deluxe, and Custom.

On 30 April 1976 Suzuki presented an emissions-scrubbed version of the Fronte 360 (model code A-LC20), featuring Suzuki's Twin Catalyst (TC) System to belatedly keep emissions below the 1975 requirements. This version was extremely short-lived and may have only been a test-run, as only 61 examples were built. The LC20 was taken out of production at the end of May 1976, although the LC20's doors and basic layout would continue in use for the succeeding SS10 (Fronte 7-S) series. The LC20 also entered production in both CBU and CKD in Indonesia; at first it entered as CBU units in 1974 under PT. Indonesia motor Company and then in 1976 the production of CKD units began with Suzuki's local partner PT Indomobil Group. Along with the ST10 Carry, it was the first four-wheeled Suzuki built there. It was only built there for about a year, soon being replaced by the revised SS10.

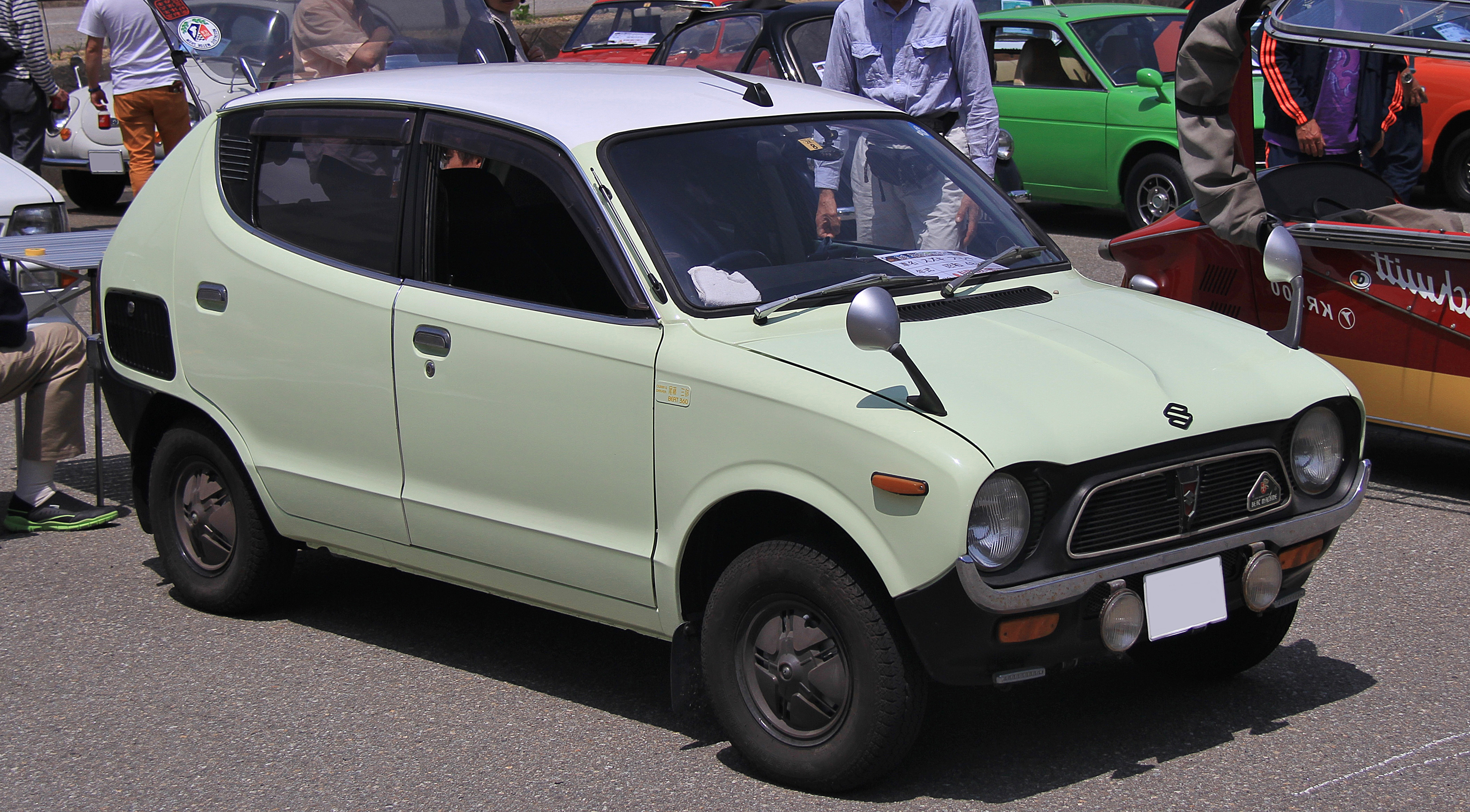
1973 Suzuki Fronte

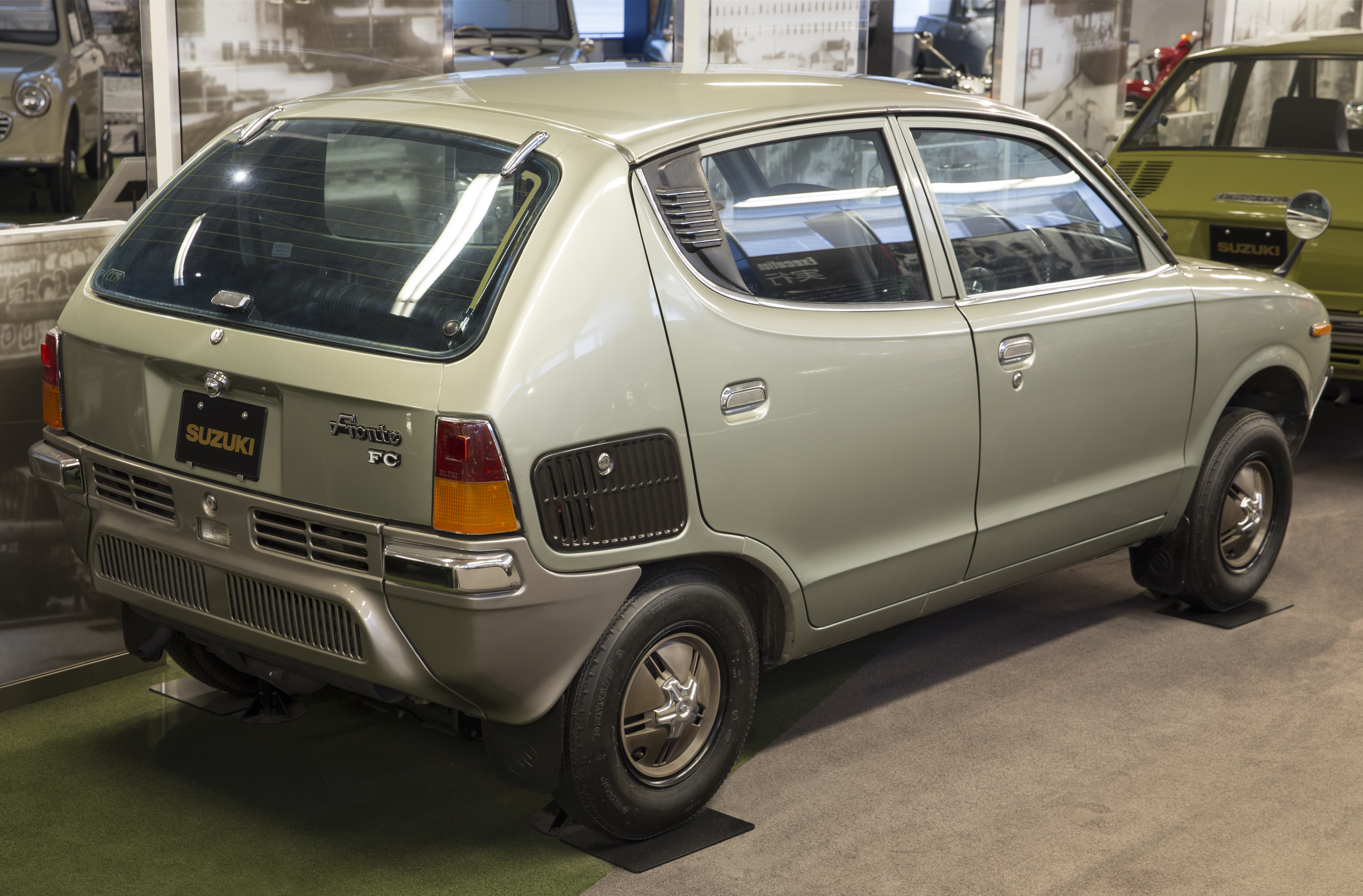
1973 Suzuki Fronte FC (rear)

== Fronte Hatch ==
=== Fronte Hatch (LS30) ===
In April 1973 the LS30 Fronte Hatch replaced the LS20 Suzuki Fronte Van. It used the 28 PS (21 kW) two-cylinder two-cycle water-cooled 359 cc L50 engine also seen in the Carry and Jimny and was of a front-engine, rear-wheel drive layout. The Hatch was available in four equipment levels, ranging from the very basic "E" which lacked even a heater, via "B" and "D" to the range topping "T" version. Being more comfortable than the LS20 Van it replaced, the Hatch was available with headrests in both front seats and better equipped models got the same dashboard as the "Sting Ray" Fronte (albeit only with two gauges).

Data table (expands)
Suzuki Fronte Hatch
	Hatch 360 (LS30)	Hatch 550 (SH10)
Transmission	FR, 4-speed manual	
Suspension F/R	coil springs / leaf sprung live axle	
Brakes F/R	drums / drums	
Wheelbase	2,005 mm (78.9 in)	2,100 mm (82.7 in)
Length/width/height	2995/1295/1380 mm 117.9/51.0/54.3 in	3195/1365/1375 mm 125.8/53.7/54.1 in
Empty weight	E: 520 kg (1,150 lb); B, Custom: 525 kg (1,157 lb); D, T: 530 kg (1,170 lb)	B: 550 kg (1,210 lb); D, T: 555 kg (1,224 lb)
Engine	L50 water-cooled, 2-stroke inline 2	LJ50 water-cooled, 2-stroke inline 3
Compression	7.0: 1, 6.8: 1 (1976)	6.4: 1
Displacement	359 cc (61.0 x 61.5mm)	539 cc (61.0 x 61.5mm)
Carburetor	1 single-barrel	
Power (SAE)	04.73-05.74: 28 PS (21 kW) at 5500 rpm 05.74-09.75: 26 PS (19 kW); 09.75-06.76: 25 PS (18 kW) at 5500 rpm	25 PS (18 kW) at 4500 rpm
Torque	04.73-05.74: 3.8 kg⋅m (37 N⋅m; 27 lb⋅ft) at 5000 rpm 05.74-09.75: 3.8 kg⋅m (37 N⋅m; 27 lb⋅ft) at 4500 rpm 09.75-06.76: 3.7 kg⋅m (36 N⋅m; 27 lb⋅ft) at 4500 rpm	5.1 kg⋅m (50 N⋅m; 37 lb⋅ft) at 3000 rpm
Top Speed	105 km/h (65 mph)	
Payload	300 kg (660 lb), 150 kg (330 lb) with four passengers 200 or 100 kg (440 or 220 lb) (1976 Custom)	
Tires	4.50 x 10 6PR	5.00 x 10
Introductory prices	E: ¥351,000 B: ¥366,000; D: ¥399,000 T: ¥418,000	

As for the earlier LS20 Fronte Van, the Hatch's spare tire was mounted in the engine compartment to allow for more cargo space in the rear. While marketed as the "LS30", the Hatch's chassis code remained LS20 as for its predecessor. To set it apart, chassis numbers skipped ahead to LS20-200001.

By December 1974 the car lost the "Fronte" badging, but retained the Fronte name in marketing material. Also in 1974 (May), the emissions became cleaner to match the 50年 (1975) emissions rules, but power was down to 26 PS. The basic "E" version was dropped. The first cosmetic change the 360 series Hatch underwent was a modification of the trunklid to accept the larger license plates (330 × 165 mm) legislated for January 1, 1975. In export markets, the vehicle was also available with rear side window panels. For the 1976 model year another horsepower was lost, as emissions rules were gradually tightened, leading to the revised model code H-LS20. The Hatch also received a new grille and more sculpted bumpers (with a stainless steel insert on the front bumper for the T and Custom), the taillights were held in place by two rather than three screws, and the C-pillar logo was altered. Suzuki also changed to a single strut for the rear gate, for improved access. A more luxurious "Custom" model was also brought out for 1976. This was somewhat lower and had a more comfortable (softer) suspension, lowering cargo capacity from 300 to 200 kg (660 to 440 lb). Production ended in May 1976.

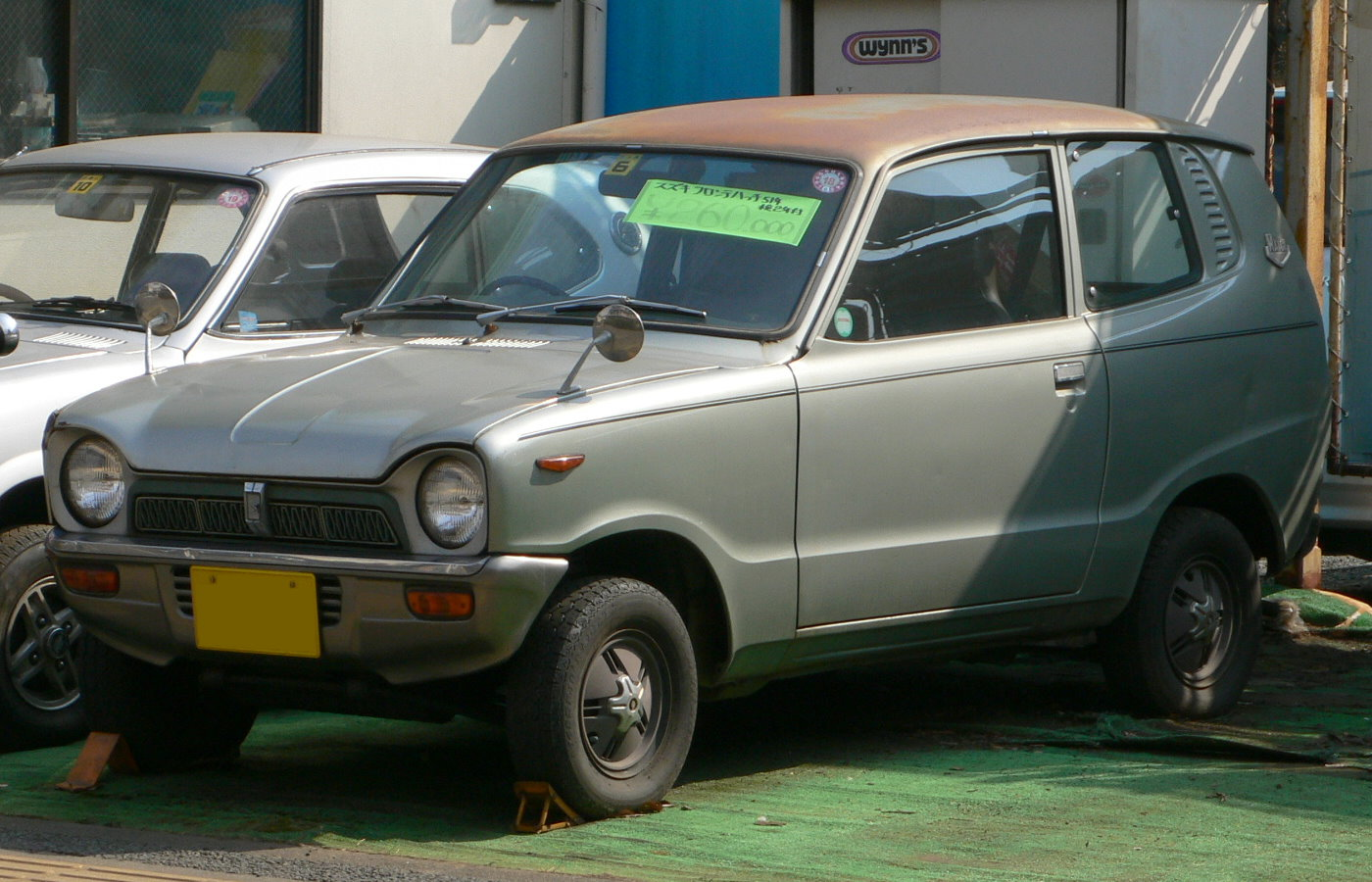
1976 Fronte Hatch Type T (H-LS20, marketed as the LS30)

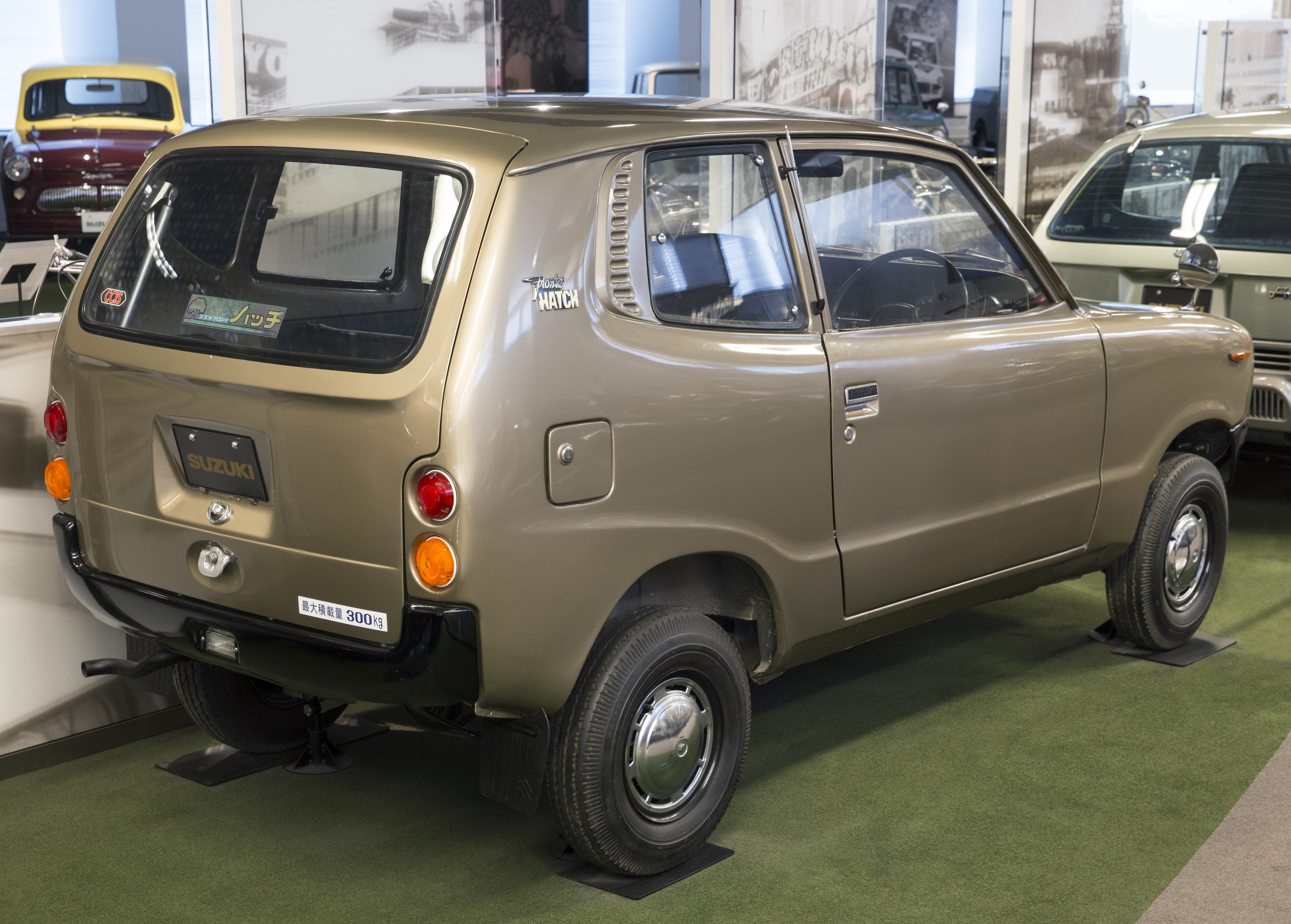
Fronte Hatch Type B (LS30; rear)

=== Hatch 55 (SH10) ===
Reflecting new Kei car rules, in July 1976 the length of the Hatch was extended to 3190 mm (wheelbase to 2100 mm), all ahead of the firewall. The new front and new large bumpers made what was an already odd-looking car even stranger. Now called the Suzuki Fronte Hatch 55 (or 550), it received the three-cylinder 539 cc LJ50 engine, which was a de-smogged L50 engine with an extra cylinder tacked on – this engine was also known as the T5A/T5B in other applications. The new model code was SH10. The inside remained nearly unchanged and the only differences at the rear was a new, larger bumper. Power remained 25 PS as for late model 360 Hatches, but torque was up considerably. The lineup was again restricted to B, D, and T models, with the T receiving chromed rather than painted bumpers.

For 1979 the models were renamed Standard, Deluxe, and Super Deluxe. The Hatch was succeeded in May 1979 by the SS30 Alto.

== Fronte 7-S (SS10/SS20) ==
Fronte 7-S
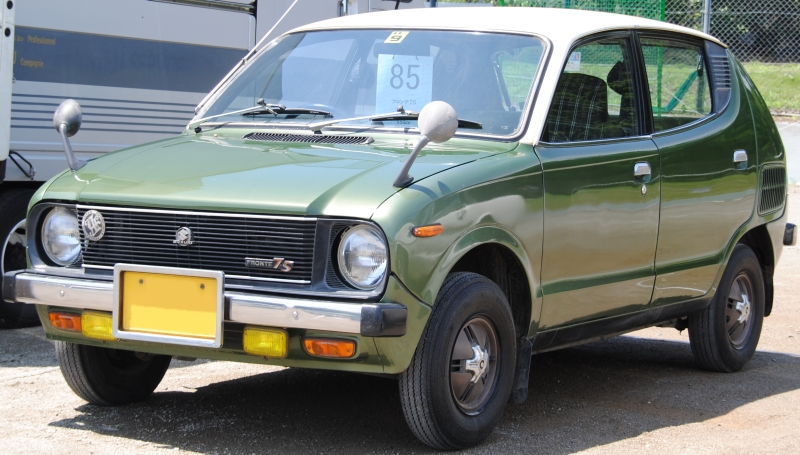
- Fronte 7-S Super Deluxe (SS10)

Overview
- Also called: Suzuki SS10, SS20
- Production: May 1976–April 1979
- Assembly: Kosai Assembly Plant, Hamana-gun, Shizuoka, Japan

Body and chassis
- Body style: 2/4-door hatchback
- Layout: RR layout
- Related: Suzuki Cervo

Powertrain
- Engine: 443 cc T4A 2-stroke I3 (SS10/12); 539 cc T5A 2-stroke I3 (SS20); 547 cc Daihatsu AB10 I2 (SS11)
- Transmission: 4-speed manual

Dimensions
- Length: 3,190 mm (125.6 in)
- Width: 1,395 mm (54.9 in)
- Height: 1,300 mm (51.2 in)
- Curb weight: 520–555 kg (1,146–1,224 lb)

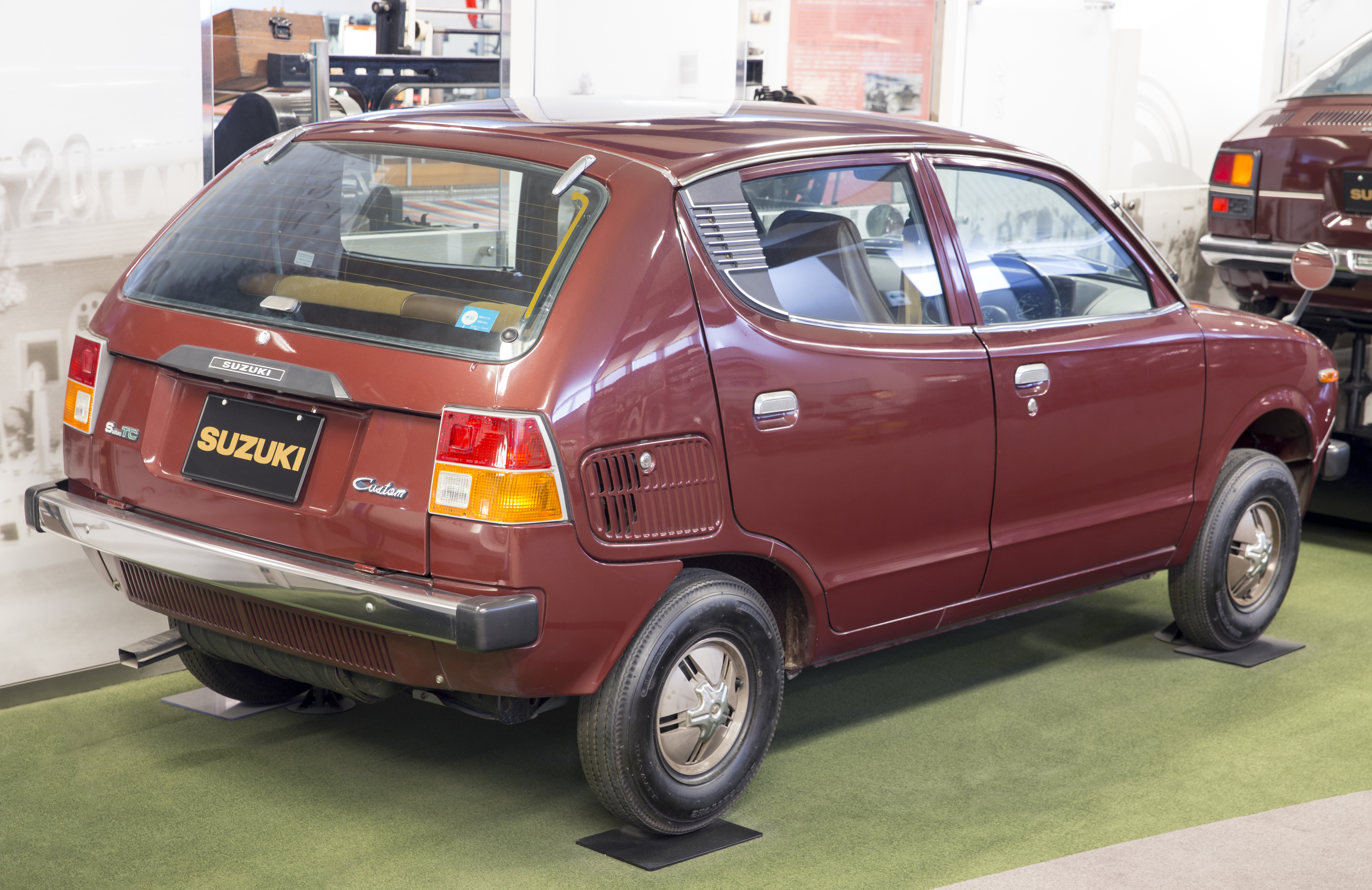
Fronte 7-S Custom (SS10; rear view)

Government plans had been made to gradually increase the Kei car engine size limit to 550 cc, to make room for cleaner four-stroke engines and to reverse the slowing Kei car sales curve. Many manufacturers responded with interim, 500 cc models in 1976, Suzuki among them. In early June 1976 the Fronte 7-S was presented, model code SS10. "7-S" was meant to stand for Space, Safety, Sense, Save money, Silent, Stamina, and Suzuki TC, not necessarily always in the same order. As per the new regulations, it was 100 mm (3.9 in) wider than the LC20 series and had a larger engine of 443 cc. Suzuki stated that this was the ideal displacement for a two-stroke engine, but gave the lie to that when they introduced a larger, 539 cc engine only sixteen months later. Wheelbase remained at 2,030 mm (79.9 in), while overall length grew to 3,190 mm (125.6 in) thanks to new bigger bumpers and a somewhat bulkier rear end. The more squared-off front end also allowed for a larger front luggage area. The new Fronte was available with either two- or four-door bodywork with an opening rear window. Four-doors were significantly more popular, representing about 70 percent of production.

The T4A engine was still a three-cylinder two-stroke (simply a bored out version of the LC10), as Suzuki considered themselves experts at this configuration and deemed it ideal for kei cars. Suzuki emphasized the two-stroke's advantages: a simpler, more reliable construction of lighter weight, requiring less maintenance, and producing more power and significantly more torque than a four-stroke of equal displacement. Suzuki advertised the fact that the new Fronte 7-S remained a two-stroke with the slogan "It's Still Alive". The new Suzuki TC ("Two Catalyst") emissions system meant that it provisionally met the provisional, 1975 (50年) emissions standards thanks to a two-way catalyst and a secondary air supply device. The downside was that the new engine produced 26 PS (19 kW) at 4500 rpm, rather than the 32 PS (24 kW) of the 360 cc engine it replaced; the provisional 1975 emissions standards also expired in September 1977, meaning these cars could not be sold past that date. The exhaust system could also become extremely hot, necessitating a warming lamp and several pages in the owner's manual dedicated to warnings and precautions to be taken to avoid starting fires or cracking the exhaust manifold.

The layout remained RR, with a four-speed manual transmission. In January 1977, the Fronte received some light alterations including a rectangular Suzuki badge in the front grille, taillights of a new construction, and a slightly remodelled engine lid with a somewhat wider recess for the license plate. The sheetmetal at the rear was also reworked and an additional heatshield installed at the rear apron, to avoid the hot exhaust system causing grass fires. This model is sometimes referred to as the SS10-2, to tell it apart from the pre-facelift model.

Fronte 7-S (A-SS10)
2-door	Standard, DeLuxe, Super DeLuxe
4-door	Standard*, DeLuxe, Super DeLuxe, Custom
The 4-door Standard was removed from pricelists by January 1977.

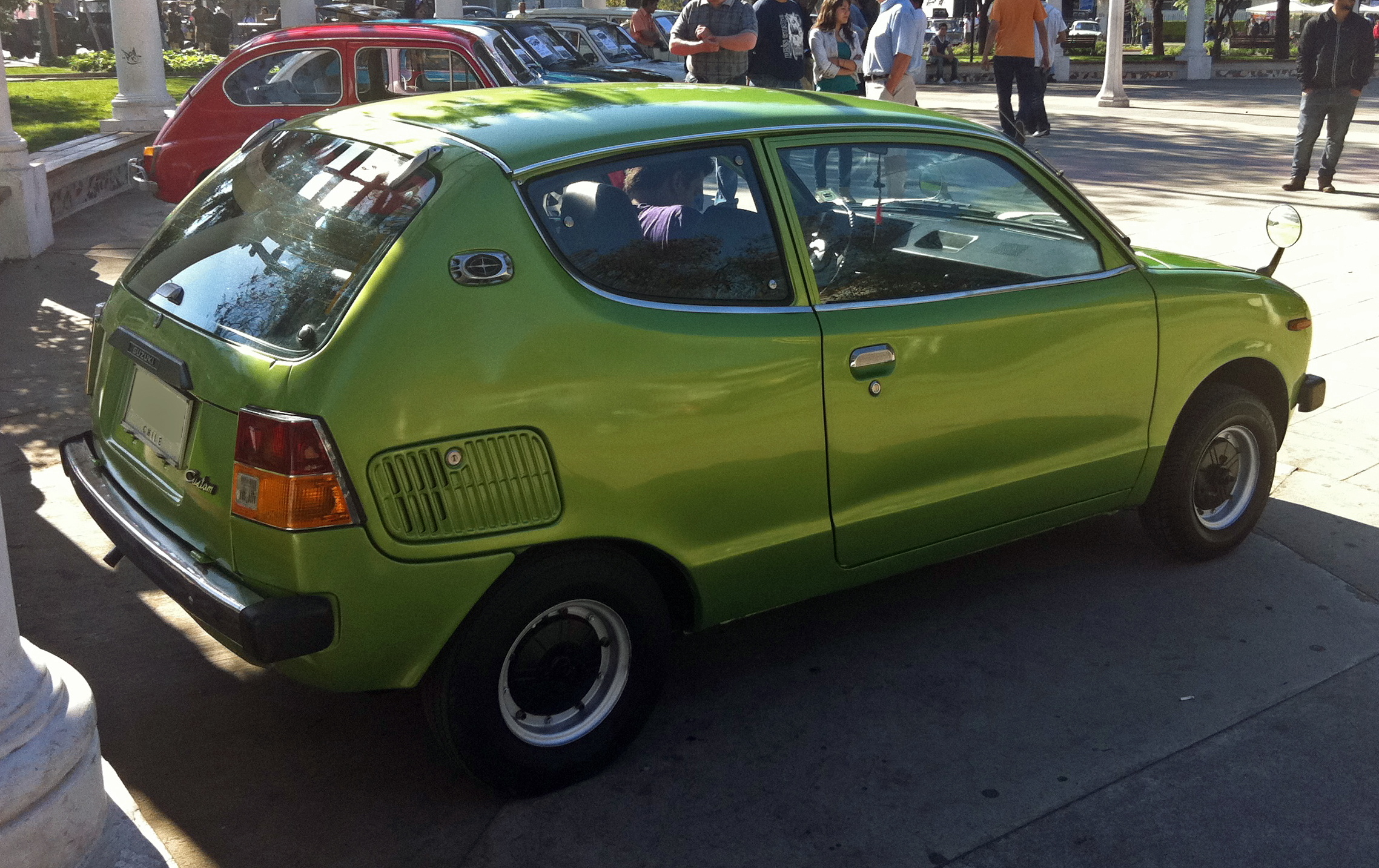
Export version "Suzuki SS10 Custom" two-door (Chile)

Suzuki's struggle to meet the 1976 emissions regulations with the two-stroke engine compelled them to write a contract with Toyota to purchase engines from their subsidiary Daihatsu, Suzuki's main competitor. The agreement was limited to a maximum of 1,000 engines per month. Beginning on 1 June 1977, Daihatsu's catalysed 28 PS (21 kW) four-stroke AB10 engine was installed in the SS11, selling in parallel with the two-stroke at a slightly higher (by ¥18,000) price. Because of the limited numbers available, four-stroke Frontes were initially only available in the all-important Tokyo market. Four-strokes had a "4" logo in the grille. These were very weak sellers, offering much less torque and drivability than their two-cycle brethren. Torque was 3.9 kg⋅m (38 N⋅m; 28 lb⋅ft) at 3500 rpm, versus 4.7 kg⋅m (46 N⋅m; 34 lb⋅ft) in the smaller two-stroke engine.

In the end, Suzuki did manage to meet the regulations with their own engine. The new SS12 Fronte 7-S going on sale on 25 May 1977, becoming the first two-stroke to meet the tighter 1978 (53年) emissions standards. It had a now even cleaner T4A engine called the TC53. "TC53" stood for Twin Catalyst, year 53 of the Showa era (1978 in the common era). This new, cleaner engine had one catalyst in the exhaust manifold and one in the muffler, but power and torque dropped even lower, down to 25 PS (18 kW), and it still barely met the official emissions standards. Fuel consumption and drivability were reported as unchanged, however. 6,421 SS12s were built over its five-month production run, compared to 66,540 SS10 Frontes.

The interim SS12 was replaced by the "full scale" 550 cc SS20 version presented on 27 October 1977, with a slight facelift consisting of a new grille, redesigned cladding around the C-pillars, and a new dashboard. The SS20 is equipped with the T5A engine (first seen in the Jimny); with 539 cc it offered 28 PS (21 kW) at 5000 rpm and 5.3 kg⋅m (52 N⋅m; 38 lb⋅ft) at 3000 rpm, which helped bring top speed back up from 105 to 110 km/h (65 to 68 mph). To use up leftover four-stroke engines, the SS11 received the same facelift as the SS20, becoming the SS11-2. The SS11-2 was fairly short-lived, though, as the new T5A engine met the emissions regulations on its own and Suzuki was now able to terminate their contract with Toyota. The torque gap between the four- and the two-stroke models was widened further: while the SS11 could climb a slope of 0.34 tanα (18.8˚) the SS20 could manage 0.52 tanα (27.5˚). The production run of the SS20 was not very long either, coming to an end after just over a year and a half.

The Fronte 7-S was never a big seller, as it was an old design and two-stroke engines were beginning to lose favor with Japanese car buyers. The SS10 and SS20 Frontes were both clearly based on the old LC20, making do with a widened LC20 chassis and using its doors and many interior parts. For the SS20 Suzuki resorted to increasingly awkward efforts to hide the LC20's curvy design with square blocks of plastic, without much success. Production ended in April 1979, as Suzuki was getting ready to introduce their new generation of front-wheel drive kei cars. In the few export markets where it was available, the Fronte 7‑S was simply sold as the "Suzuki SS10" and "SS20", foregoing the Fronte name. It was also built with left-hand-drive, for export, but also for the Okinawan market where traffic drove on the opposite side of the road until the end of July 1978. The SS10 received an engine less burdened by emissions equipment than the Japanese market model, producing 28 PS (21 kW) at 4500 rpm. It was available as the two-door FC (Custom) and the four-door GL (Deluxe).

== Fronte fifth generation (SS30/SS40) ==
Fronte (SS30/40)
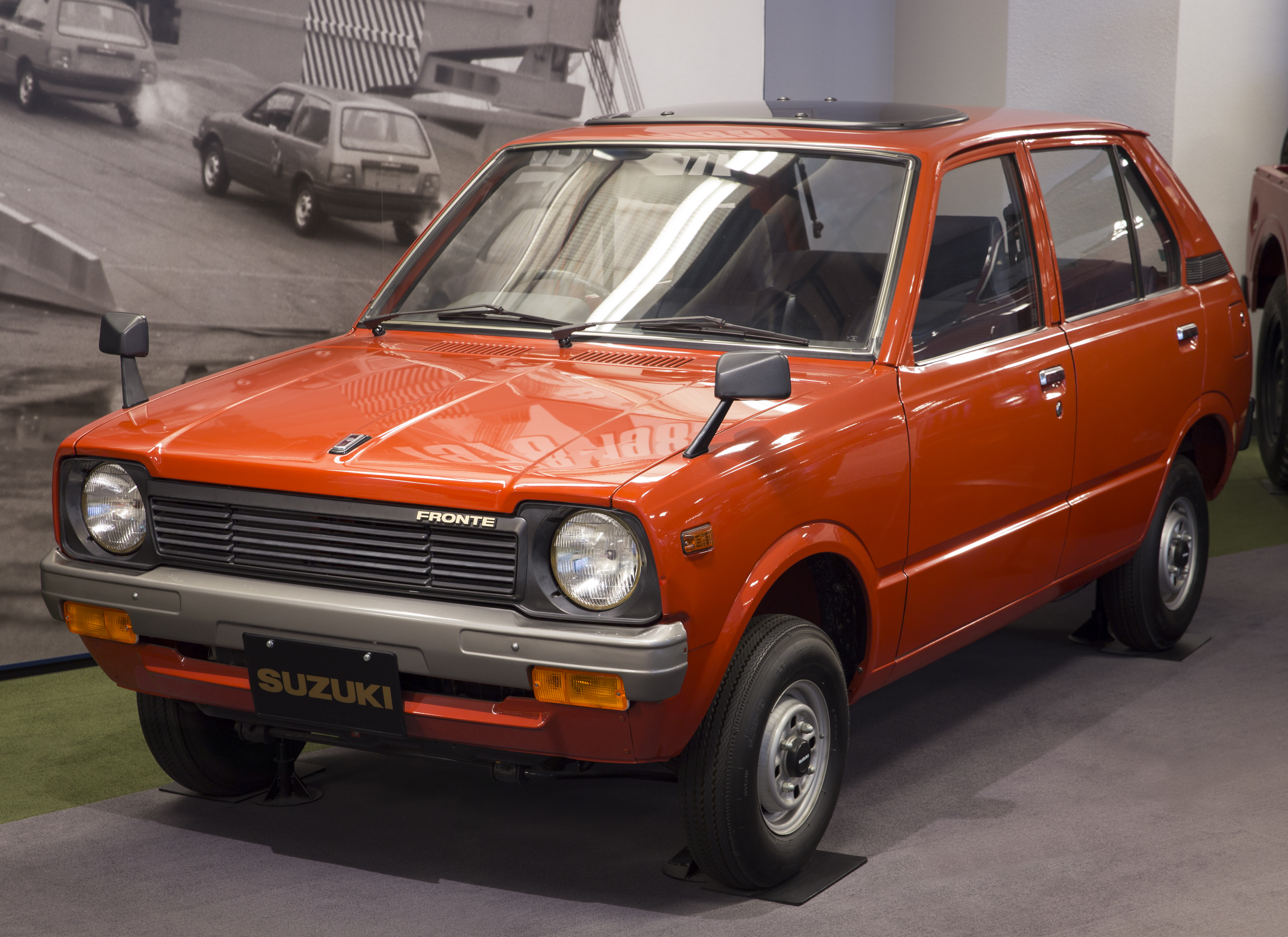
- Suzuki Fronte SS40S-2 (1981 first facelift)

Overview
- Model code: SS30S/40S/80S
- Also called: Suzuki Alto; Suzuki FX; Maruti 800
- Production: 1979–1984
- Assembly: Kosai Assembly Plant, Hamana-gun, Shizuoka, Japan; Karachi, Pakistan; Nairobi, Kenya

Body and chassis
- Body style: 3/5-door hatchback
- Related: Suzuki Cervo

Powertrain
- Engine: 539 cc T5B two-stroke I3 (SS30); 543 cc F5A SOHC I3 (SS40); 796 cc F8B SOHC I3 (SS80)

Dimensions
- Wheelbase: 2,150 mm (85 in)
- Length: 3,195 mm (125.8 in)
- Width: 1,395 mm (54.9 in)
- Height: 1,335 mm (52.6 in)
- Curb weight: 570 kg (1,260 lb)

In May 1979 the Fronte 7-S was replaced by the new SS30/SS40 Fronte. The Fronte Hatch 55 was also discontinued; from now on the commercial versions all used the Alto name. Alto also came to be the name used in export markets. SS30S was the two-stroke engined version of the Fronte (539 cc, three cylinders, 28 PS (21 kW) T5B) while the SS40S received a newly developed, 543 cc four-stroke three-cylinder engine, the F5A. This developed 31 PS (23 kW) and proved very popular, soon displacing the two-stroke entirely. The T5B would no longer be available in the Fronte after May 1981. The Alto light commercials received the SS30V/SS40V designation, and considerably lower gearing since it was mainly intended for short distance inner-city use. Both the Alto and Fronte had a claimed top speed of 110 km/h (68 mph).

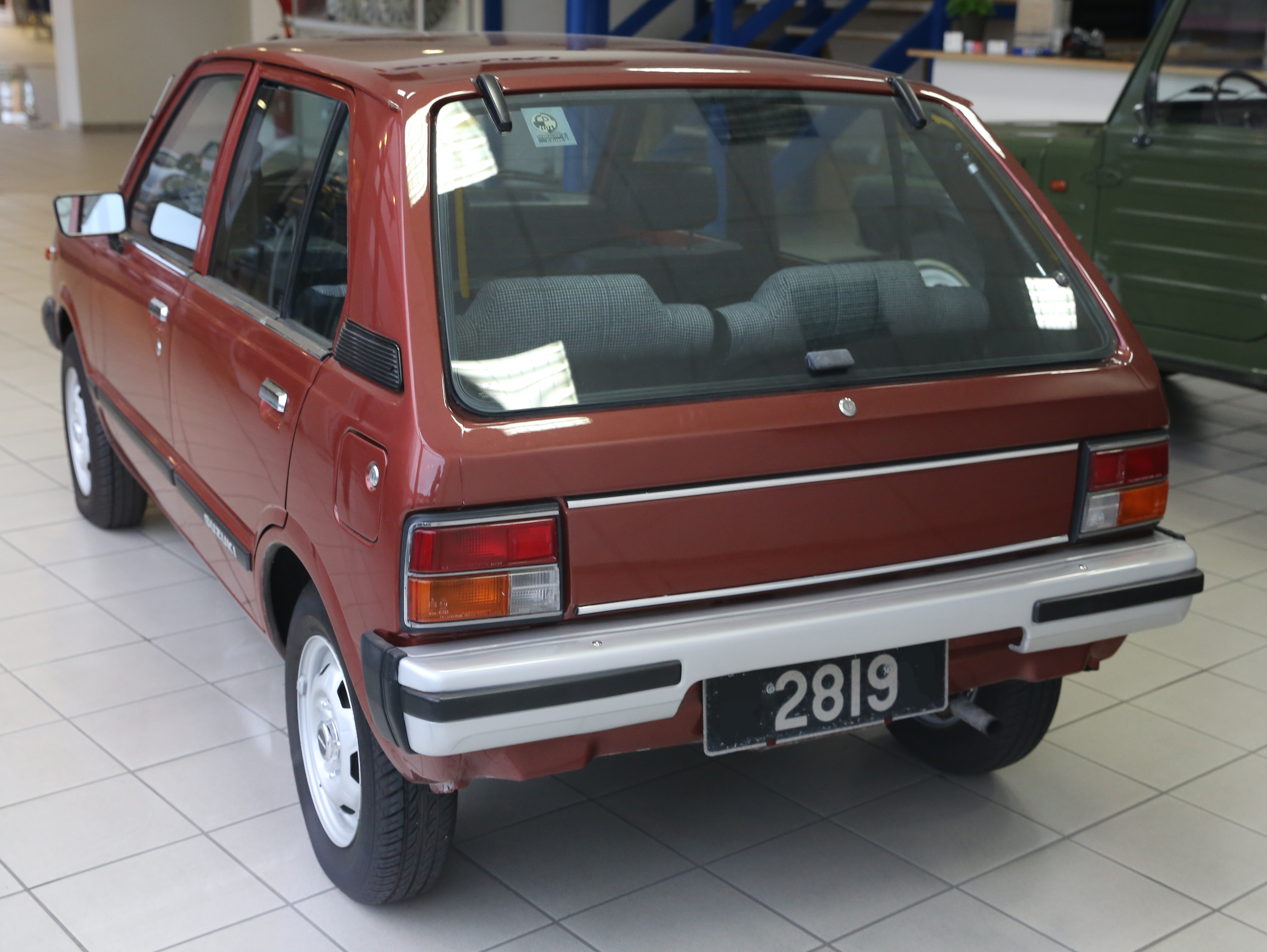
Rear view, showing the opening rear window (Alto SS80F, Europe)

The new Fronte was a big step away from the SS20, making the switch from a rear-engined, rear-wheel drive configuration to a more up-to-date transversely mounted engine in front, driving the front wheels. Wheelbase was increased from 2030 to 2150 mm and the new car was much more spacious. The four-door Fronte had an opening rear glass window, whereas the two-door Alto got a proper rear hatch. In some export markets the car was just known as the Suzuki SS40. In Europe, the Fronte (usually labelled Alto) was also sold with a 796 cc four-stroke three (SS80) from July 1981 and was 100 mm longer, thanks to bigger bumpers. These cars also received larger 12-inch wheels. Four-doors received the SS80F chassis code, while three-door passenger versions were called SS80G. Other markets, such as Chile, received the SS80 with "Fronte 800" badging, echoing the 1960s car with the same name.

In May 1980 a new, low-cost variant called FX-A or FS-A (depending on engine fitment) was added. In May 1981 the grille was revised somewhat, now extending into the headlight surrounds. This was also when the two-stroke engine was discontinued for the Fronte; it continued to be offered on the Alto until September. In October a two-speed automatic with a torque converter was added on two new models, called FS-QG and FS-QA.

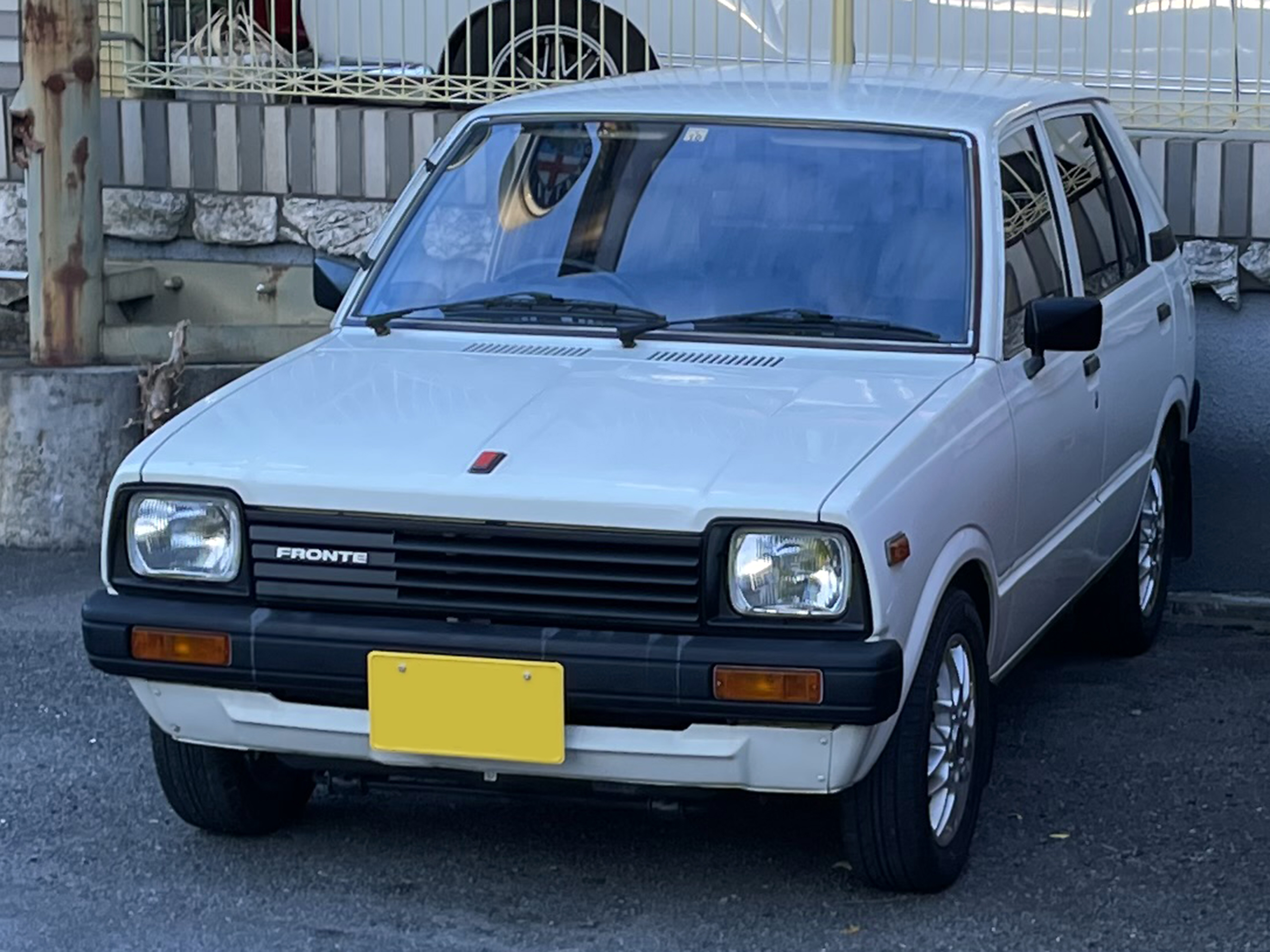
1983 second facelift

In May 1983 the Fronte/Alto received a minor facelift, and now featured square headlamps and a revised, asymmetrical grille. The Fronte's engine was also mildly updated, while on the outside there were door mirrors rather than the fender-mounted ones. The valve timing was adjusted and transistor ignition was introduced, the compression ratio nudged up to 9.7:1 (from 9.5), and the EGR and catalytic converter were improved. Claimed power inched down to 29 PS (21 kW) at 6000 rpm. A new top version, the FS-QG, was also introduced: it featured digital instrumentation. The Alto generally outsold the Fronte at a rate of about five to two, although the Fronte remained the best selling kei passenger car into 1984.

From 1984 until replaced in 1986, the four-door SS80 Fronte was built in India by Maruti as the "800".

Cooper Motor Corporation (CMC) of Nairobi, Kenya, also assembled the four-door SS80 in the eighties.

Pricelist

Two-stroke (SS30)		Four-stroke (SS40)	
FX	¥568,000	FS	¥568,000
FX-L	¥638,000	FS-L	¥638,000
FX-C	¥678,000	FS-C	¥678,000
FX-G	¥718,000	FS-G	¥718,000
The Alto was priced at a very low ¥470,000

=== FX 800 ===
In Pakistan the four-door version was available with the F8B engine (800 cc, 40 hp), and was sold as the Suzuki FX 800. The FX was sold from 1983 to 1988 when it was replaced by the SB-308 body style (also known as the CB72, which ended production in early 2020), called the Suzuki Mehran. The FX features prominently as the car driven by the protagonist in Mohsin Hamid's debut work Moth Smoke.

== Fronte sixth generation (CB71/72) ==
Fronte (CB71)
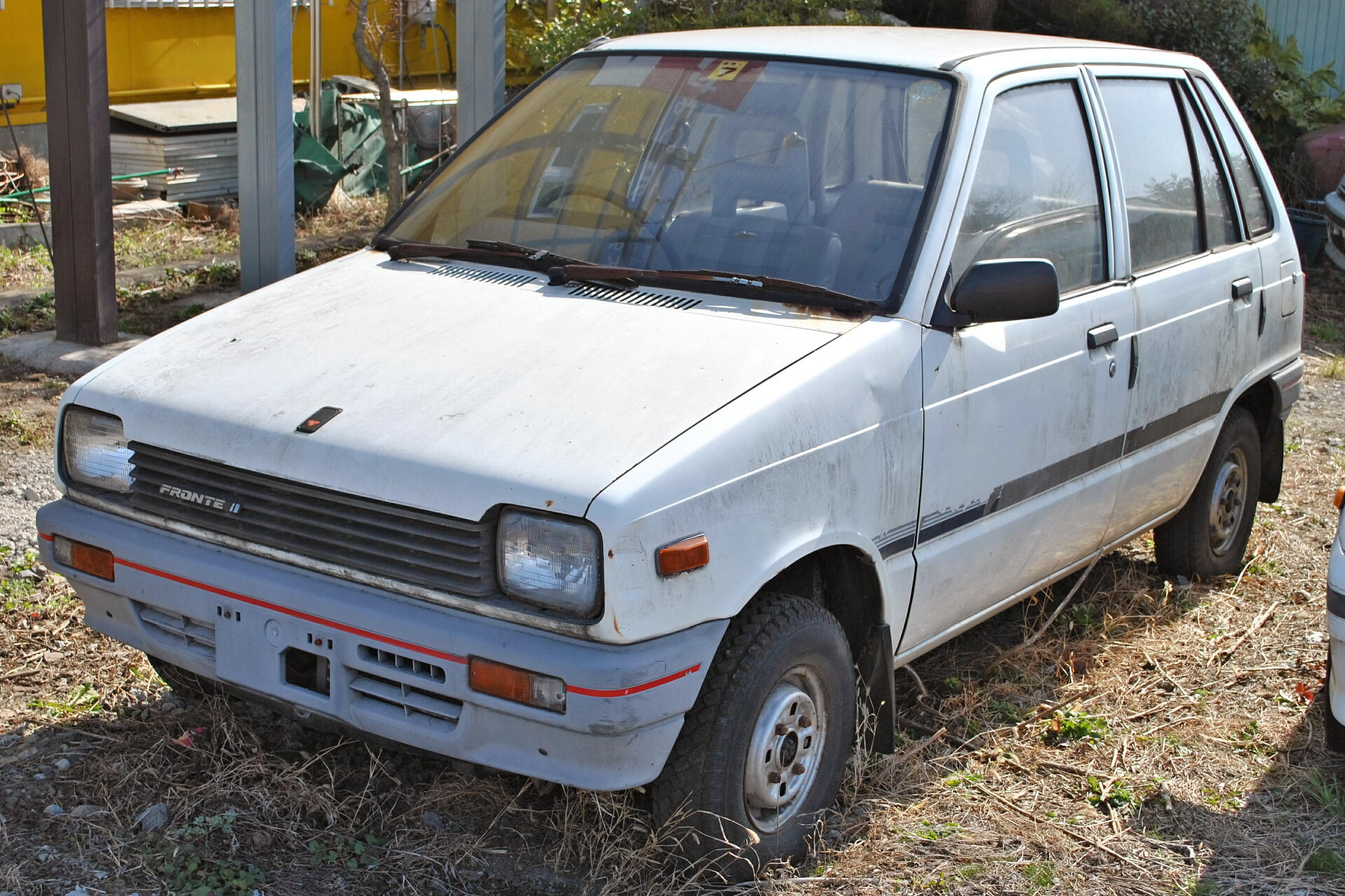
- Pre-facelift Fronte (CB71S)

Overview
- Model code: CB71S/CB72S/CD72S
- Also called: Suzuki FX; Maruti 800
- Production: 1984-1988 (Worldwide); 1988-2013 (China); 1988-2018 (Pakistan; renamed "Mehran" in 1994); 1983-2013 (India)
- Assembly: Hamana-gun, Shizuoka, Japan; Karachi, Pakistan; Nairobi, Kenya; Chongqing, China; Jilin, China; Zhangjiagang, Jiangsu; Xi'an, Shaanxi Province; Gurgaon, Haryana, India (Maruti)

Body and chassis
- Body style: 3/5-door hatchback
- Layout: Front-engine, front-wheel-drive four-wheel-drive (CD72S)

Powertrain
- Engine: 543 cc F5A I3 (SS40); 543 cc F5A DOHC I3; 796 cc F8B I3 (SS80)

Dimensions
- Wheelbase: 2,175 mm (85.6 in)
- Length: 3,195 mm (125.8 in)
- Width: 1,395 mm (54.9 in)
- Height: 1,410 mm (56 in)
- Curb weight: 590 kg (1,300 lb)

In September 1984 the new Fronte CB71 was introduced. Now only with the F5A four-stroke engine, it retained the suspension of the SS40 model (leaf springs, beam axle). The Fronte was now a full five-door hatchback, on a wheelbase extended to 2,175 mm (85.6 in). Only the 543 cc F5A engine was available, with the power output back up to 31 PS (23 kW) at 6000 rpm. The most expensive model, the FG, received front disc brakes (the lesser versions making do with drums all around) and a 5-speed manual transmission or a 3-speed automatic. As before, the Fronte received higher gearing than the Alto, reflecting its intended usage. Top speed was 120 km/h (75 mph), 2 more than the Alto.

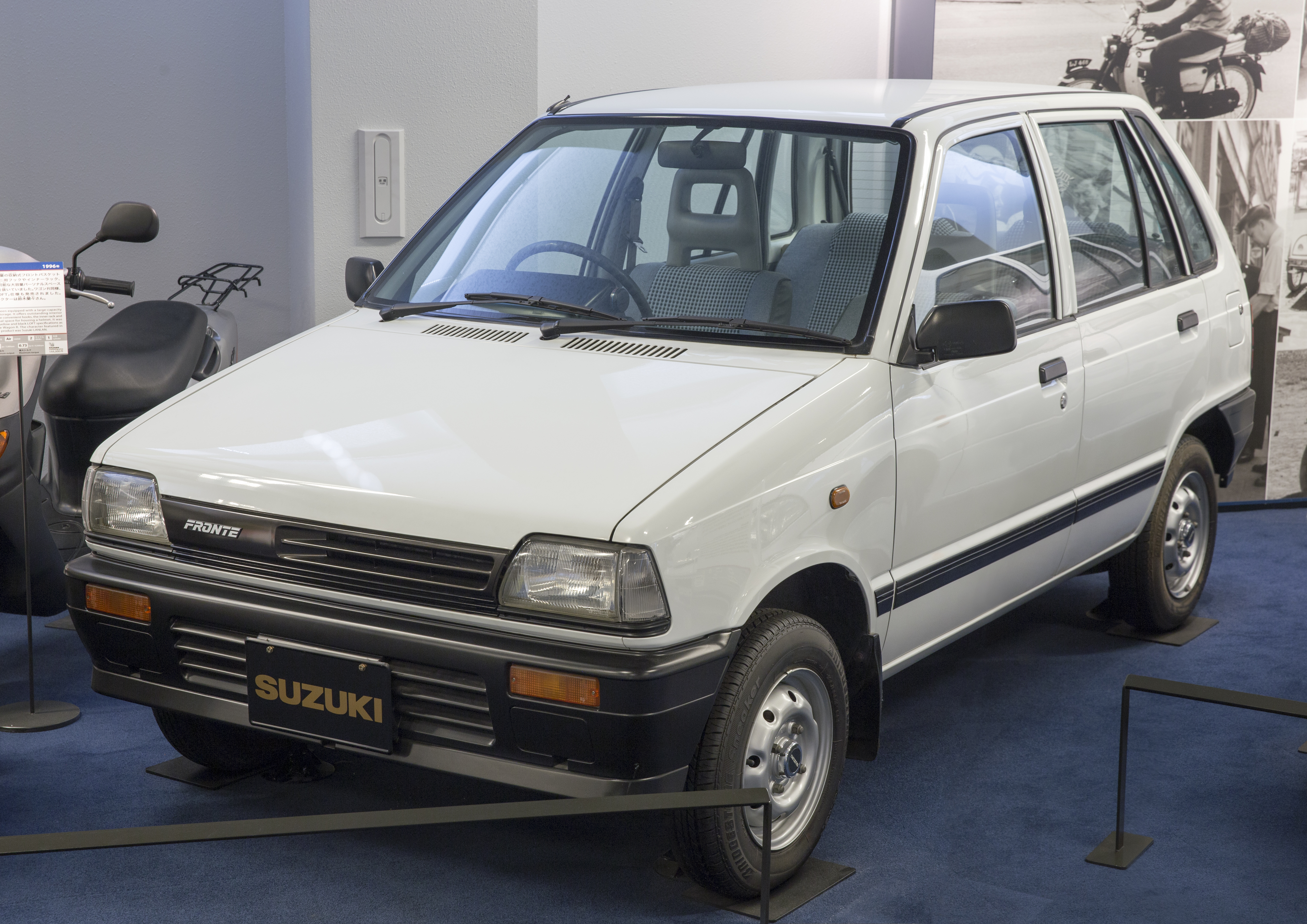
Facelifted, 1987 Fronte FG (CB72S)

In July 1986 the CB71 became the CB72 after a rather thorough facelift. The headlights were new, of a wraparound design, and the interior was changed with a new dashboard. The main changes, however, were under the skin: the old rear suspension was replaced with Suzuki's patented ITL suspension (Isolated Trailing Link). This three-link rigid setup considerably improved the ride. In November 1987, the Fronte Wit Custom was presented - this was a special edition based on the top FG version of the Fronte, keeping that car's features such as a rotating driver's seat and variable ratio power steering, with additional standard equipment like halogen headlamps, special hubcaps, a moquette interior, and climate control (a first for the kei class).

By February 1987, the Fronte became available as a three-door, with the FS Twin Cam 12 version with a 40 PS (29 kW) at 7500 rpm, DOHC 12-valve F5A engine (FR in the five-door version). The engine had two horsepower more in the Alto; this is due to less stringent emissions standards for commercial vehicles. In August 1987 a three-speed automatic transmission became available, and lastly there was also a part-time four-wheel drive version of the five-door CB72 Fronte (the CD72S, from January 1988). By September, the CB/CD72 was replaced. The 1988 Suzuki Cervo used the chassis, front clip and door panels from the CB/CD72 Fronte.

A slightly longer and wider version (bigger bumpered), equipped with the same 796 cc engine as the SS80, producing 40 PS (29 kW) was the export model. In Europe it was sold as the Alto, in other countries as the SB308 or with the Fronte nameplate. The facelifted Fronte has also been produced (or still is being built) under license by many other manufacturers:

- Chang'an SC 7080
- Jiangbei Alto JJ 7080
- Jiangnan JNJ 7080 Alto
- Maruti 800 (aka Suzuki Maruti)
- Suzuki Mehran
- Xian Alto QCJ 7080

== Fronte seventh generation (CN11S) ==
Fronte (CN11S)

Overview
- Model code: CN11S/CP11S
- Production: Oct 1988-March 1989
- Assembly: Hamana-gun, Shizuoka, Japan

Body and chassis
- Body style: 5-door hatchback
- Layout: Front-engine, front-wheel-drive four-wheel-drive (CP11S)
- Related: Daewoo Tico

Powertrain
- Engine: 547 cc F5B 12v I3

Dimensions
- Wheelbase: 2,335 mm (91.9 in)
- Length: 3,195 mm (125.8 in)
- Width: 1,395 mm (54.9 in)
- Height: 1,385 mm (54.5 in)
- Curb weight: 590 kg (1,300 lb)

In September 1988, the new CN11S Fronte debuted. The previous generation was not as roomy as the competition due to its comparably short wheelbase, but the new version addressed this issue by having it stretched out by 160 mm (6.3 in) to 2,335 mm (91.9 in). A sleeker looking body, with rear side windows that wrapped around the edge of the roof, also helped sales. Apart from the very cheapest variants, the Fronte got front disc brakes and 12 inch radial tyres. The Fronte also received the 547 cc 12-valve SOHC F5B engine from the Suzuki Cervo, developing 40 PS (29 kW) at a lively 7500 rpm. There was no three-door version this time, but a 4WD variant (CP11) was available.

CN/CP11S Pricelist (09.89)
Model	Manual	Automatic
FP	¥669,000	¥729,000
Wit	¥749,000	¥809,000
We've	¥839,000	¥899,000
FL	¥895,000 (5MT)	¥935,000
FI 4WD	¥875,000	-

And then, only six months later, Suzuki's longest running nameplate was laid to rest. When Japanese tax laws for vehicles in the kei class were changed in April 1989, kei commercial vehicles were no longer quite as favored as before. But, since the Alto had long had a much larger market share than the Fronte, it was decided to drop the Fronte name and focus marketing efforts on the Alto, which now became available as a five-door and three-door sedan as well as a three-door van. With the 796 cc engine, the CN11S Fronte was built in China as the Anchi 6330. The CN11 was never exported to Europe, as they received the Cervo Mode (labelled as an Alto) instead. However, South Korea's Daewoo built the car under license as the Tico, and this model saw a great deal of sales particularly in Eastern Europe.
