= Suzuki Jimny =

Mini SUV

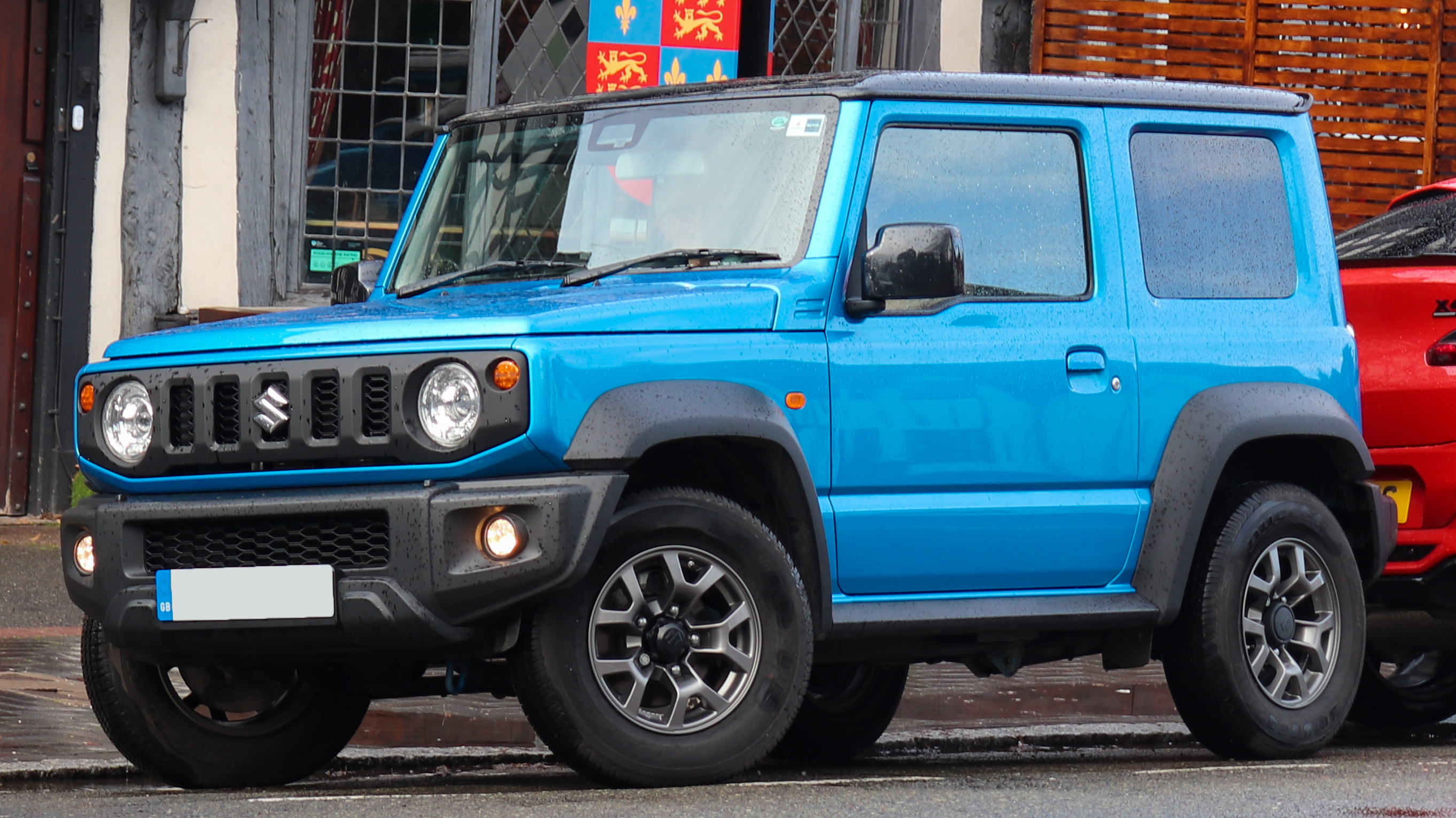
- 2019 Suzuki Jimny SZ5

Overview
- Manufacturer: Suzuki
- Production: April 1970 – present (2.85 million units sold as of September 2018)

Body and chassis
- Class: Off-road mini SUV; Kei car Compact SUV (5-door variant)
- Body style: 3/5-door SUV; 3-door van; 2-door convertible; 2-door pickup truck
- Layout: Front-engine, rear-wheel-drive (1986–2006); Front-engine, four-wheel-drive
- Chassis: Body-on-frame
- Related: Maruti Gypsy

The Suzuki Jimny (Japanese: スズキ・ジムニー, Hepburn: Suzuki Jimunī) is a series of four-wheel drive off-road mini SUVs manufactured and marketed by Japanese automaker Suzuki since 1970.

Originally belonging to the kei class, Japan's light automobile tax/legal class, the company continues to market a kei-compliant version for the Japanese and global markets as the Jimny, as well as versions that exceed kei-class limitations. Suzuki has marketed 2.85 million units of the Jimny in 194 countries through September 2018.

== History ==
The history of Suzuki four-wheel drive cars began in the latter half of the 1960s, when Suzuki bought a Steyr-Puch Haflinger to study with the intent of building a kei-class off-road vehicle. A better opportunity presented itself in 1968, when Suzuki was able to buy bankrupt Japanese automaker Hope Motor Company, which had introduced a small off-road vehicle called the HopeStar ON360. The tiny Hope company had been unable to enter series production, and only about 45 were manufactured.

The first Suzuki-branded four-wheel drive, the LJ10 (Light Jeep 10), wasn't introduced until 1970. The LJ10 had a Kei-class sized 359-cc, air cooled, two-stroke, in-line twin-cylinder engine. The liquid-cooled LJ20 was introduced in 1972 with the cooling updated due to newly enacted emission legislation, and it gained 3 hp. In 1975, Suzuki complemented the LJ20 with the LJ50, which had a larger, 539-cc, in-line three-cylinder engine – but still two-stroke – and it came with bigger differentials. This was originally targeted at the Australian market, but more exports soon followed.

The Jimny 8 / LJ80 – updated from the LJ50, with an 800 cc, four-stroke, four-cylinder in-line engine, the final version of the original LJ series – was followed by the second generation Jimny 1000 / SJ410 (1.0 litre), and Jimny 1300 / SJ413 1.3 litre. An updated version of the SJ413 became known as the Samurai and was the first Suzuki officially marketed in the US. The LJ80 was known as the Stockman in Australia, the series from SJ410 to SJ413 was known as the Sierra in Australia, and remained the Jimny in some markets.

The third generation Jimny was released in 1998, and since then has acquired the same name in all markets. The 1998 release used the G13BB Suzuki G engine with electronic fuel injection (EFI), which was replaced by the M13AA EFI Suzuki M engine in 2001 and the M13AA engine with variable valve timing in 2005, in conjunction with a minor interior redesign.

In late 2018, Suzuki launched an all new fourth generation Jimny. The engine displacement rose to 1.5 litre for the export versions and the JDM Sierra; and for the first time in history, the power output could exceed 100 PS (74 kW). The fourth-gen Jimny is again available with a stretched wheelbase (34 cm / 13.4 in) and with a five door configuration.

== Common design characteristics ==
=== Overall construction ===
All four Jimny generations have a separate body and ladder frame. The body is legally not a structural carrying part of the vehicle. Originally, It served only as a cabin to protect the occupants from the elements (but on early models not even that), provide comfort – and yet, on later models, it is strong enough to protect occupants in case of a crash. It is legal to own and drive on public roads and highways in the majority of countries in the world.

=== Suspension ===
All four Jimny generations have dependent suspension (solid-beam axles) both at the front and rear axles. This used to be a common suspension design for all-terrain vehicles up to 1990s, but has become a rarity in vehicle design in the 21st century. Dependent suspension is particularly well suited for all-terrain duty, both from the durability and performance perspectives.

The first two Jimny generations used leaf-sprung suspension at all four wheels, with the third and fourth generations using coil-sprung suspension at all four wheels. The late second-generation model called SJ800 Coily had coil-sprung suspension, as well.

=== Steering ===
All four Jimny generations have recirculating ball steering mechanism, which is particularly well suited for all-terrain duty, but relatively imprecise on-road compared to modern rack-and-pinion steering construction.

=== Transmission ===
All four Jimny generations have manually user-selectable part-time four-wheel drive (4WD) transmission, where the default (on-road) transmission mode is two-wheel drive (rear-wheel drive). Rear-wheel drive can never be disengaged. The user, however, can (dis)engage the front-wheel drive (FWD) manually at any time under certain operating conditions. When FWD is also engaged, this provides 4WD.

Jimnys have no centre (interaxle) differential. This has a positive effect that at least two wheels, where each wheel is on a different axle, have to lose traction for the vehicle to lose traction when in 4WD transmission mode. However, the negative effect is that 4WD transmission mode must not be used on any surface not rather slippery, especially if having to steer. In other words, 4WD transmission mode should be used only on rather slippery surfaces, like snow, ice, mud, loose gravel, wet grass, and sand. Wet asphalt, wet concrete, and hard-packed gravel are not considered slippery enough.

All four Jimny generations have manually user-selectable dual-ratio (dual-range) gearing mechanism. The two ratios or ranges are called "high range" (for regular on-road driving and light to moderate all-terrain driving) and "low range" (for moderate to hard all-terrain driving and for all-terrain towing). The overall transmission gearing ratio is exactly halved when the vehicle is in low range transmission mode. This has the effect of the vehicle moving about half as fast, but with double torque at the wheels in any transmission gear. For example, the fourth gear in low range behaves similar to the second gear in high range, and third gear in low range behaves similarly as "1.5th gear" in high range. The transmission gearing range is selectable only when the vehicle is in 4WD transmission mode. Therefore, low range cannot be used for on-road towing.

The (dis)engagement of 4WD transmission mode and the switch from one gearing range to another is performed by a dedicated transfer case mechanical unit, which is separate from the regular gear box unit. All four Jimny generations have a transfer case with an attached selection lever protruding in the cabin between the main gear box lever and the handbrake lever. The lever allows the user to select 2WD-H, 4WD-H or 4WD-L transmission modes at will. The only exceptions are later production years of third-generation Jimnys (more info in a dedicated chapter), which do not have a selection lever, but instead have servo-actuated mechanism to perform the same actions when invoked by the push of certain buttons in the cabin.

== HopeStar ON360 ==
The vehicle was originally developed by the Hope Motor Company of Japan in 1967 and available as the HopeStar ON360 from April 1968. It used a Mitsubishi 359 cc (21.9 cu in) air-cooled, two-stroke ME24 engine, which produced 21 PS (15.4 kW; 20.7 bhp) at 5,500 rpm, and 32 N⋅m (23.6 ft⋅lb) of torque at 3,500 rpm. Brakes were Daihatsu units, the rear axle was sourced from the Mitsubishi Colt 1000, and the wheels were sourced from the Mitsubishi Jeep. It was a very basic two-seater vehicle with no doors, but a sturdy 4WD system allowed it to go off-road. Top speed was 70 km/h (43 mph), 30 km/h (18.6 mph) in four-wheel drive mode. The tiny Hope company sold very few ON360s, only 15 in the domestic market and another 30 exported to Southeast Asia, although 100 ME24 engines were purchased. Hope proceeded to sell the design to Suzuki in 1968, after Mitsubishi declined to take over production.

== First generation (1970) ==
First generation
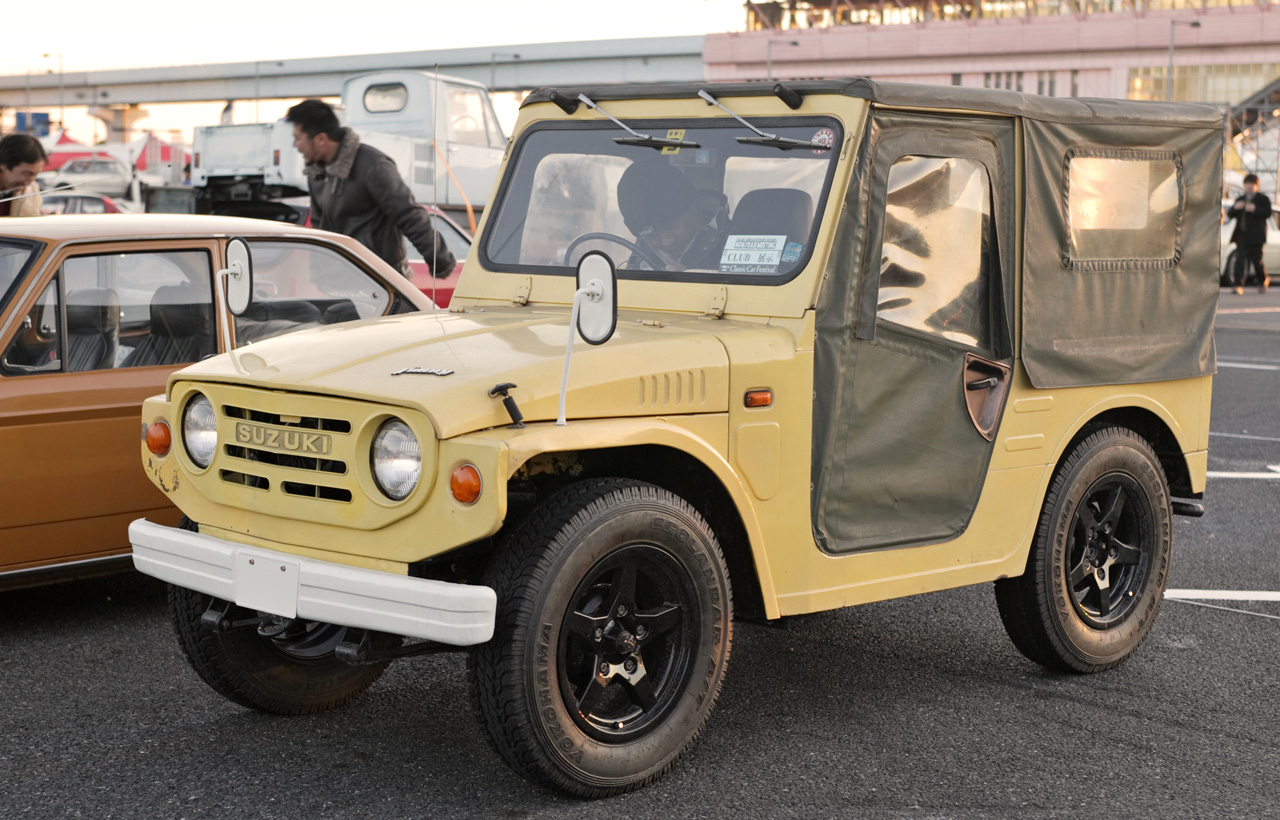
- Suzuki Jimny LJ10

Overview
- Model code: LJ10/SJ20
- Also called: Suzuki LJ50/LJ55/LJ80; Suzuki Brute (USA); Suzuki Eljot (Germany); Suzuki Stockman (Australia)
- Production: 1970–1981
- Assembly: Japan: Iwata; Indonesia: Bekasi (Indo Mobil); Kenya: Nairobi (CMC); New Zealand: Whanganui (South Pacific Suzuki)

Body and chassis
- Body style: 2-door SUV; 2-door convertible 2-door cab chassis

Powertrain
- Engine: 359 cc FB/L50 I2; 539 cc LJ50 I3; 797 cc F8A I4
- Transmission: 4-speed manual

Dimensions
- Wheelbase: 1,930 mm (76.0 in); 2,200 mm (86.6 in)
- Length: 2,955–3,170 mm (116.3–124.8 in); 3,620 mm (142.5 in) (LJ81)
- Width: 1,295 mm (51.0 in) (LJ10, LJ20); 1,395 mm (54.9 in) (SJ10, SJ20)
- Height: 1,660 mm (65.4 in)

Chronology
- Predecessor: HopeStar ON360

The compact off-road capable Suzuki Jimny was Suzuki's first global success, lending it name recognition and a foothold in markets worldwide. The Jimny occupied an unfilled gap in the market.

=== LJ10 ===
Suzuki's first move on acquiring the rights to the ON360 was rebodying it and replacing the Mitsubishi engine with an air-cooled 359 cc (21.9 cu in) Suzuki "FB" 2-stroke Inline 2, which produced 25 PS (18 kW). Since the new unit remained smaller than 360 cc, and Suzuki placed the spare tire inside the truck (making it a three-seater) to keep it under 3 m in overall length, it was classified as a kei car, conferring certain tax privileges and other benefits. When it was introduced in April 1970, it was the first four-wheel drive kei car to enter series production. The LJ10 Jimnys had 16-inch wheels, weighed 590 kg (1,301 lb), and had a top speed of 75 km/h (47 mph). The engine was soon uprated to 27 PS (20 kW), but the claimed top speed remained unchanged.

The original Jimny was an unexpected hit, with nearly 5,000 units selling in its home market in the first year, immediately outselling the leading offroad vehicle on the market at the time, the Mitsubishi Jeep. Over 6,000 were sold in 1971. Production was initially subcontracted and was carried out mainly by hand, but Suzuki soon realized that the Jimny needed to have a dedicated assembly line to allow production to be ramped up. Transmission gear ratios were 3.68:1 1st 2.21:1 2nd 1.47:1 3rd 1.00:1 4th and 3.68:1 rev.

=== LJ20 ===
The LJ was updated in May 1972 and renamed the LJ20. The grille bars were changed from horizontal to vertical for the LJ20. The engine was replaced with an updated, water-cooled unit called the L50; its 28 PS (21 kW) enabled the LJ to reach 80 km/h (50 mph). With production brought in house, Suzuki was able to build 2,000 cars per month.

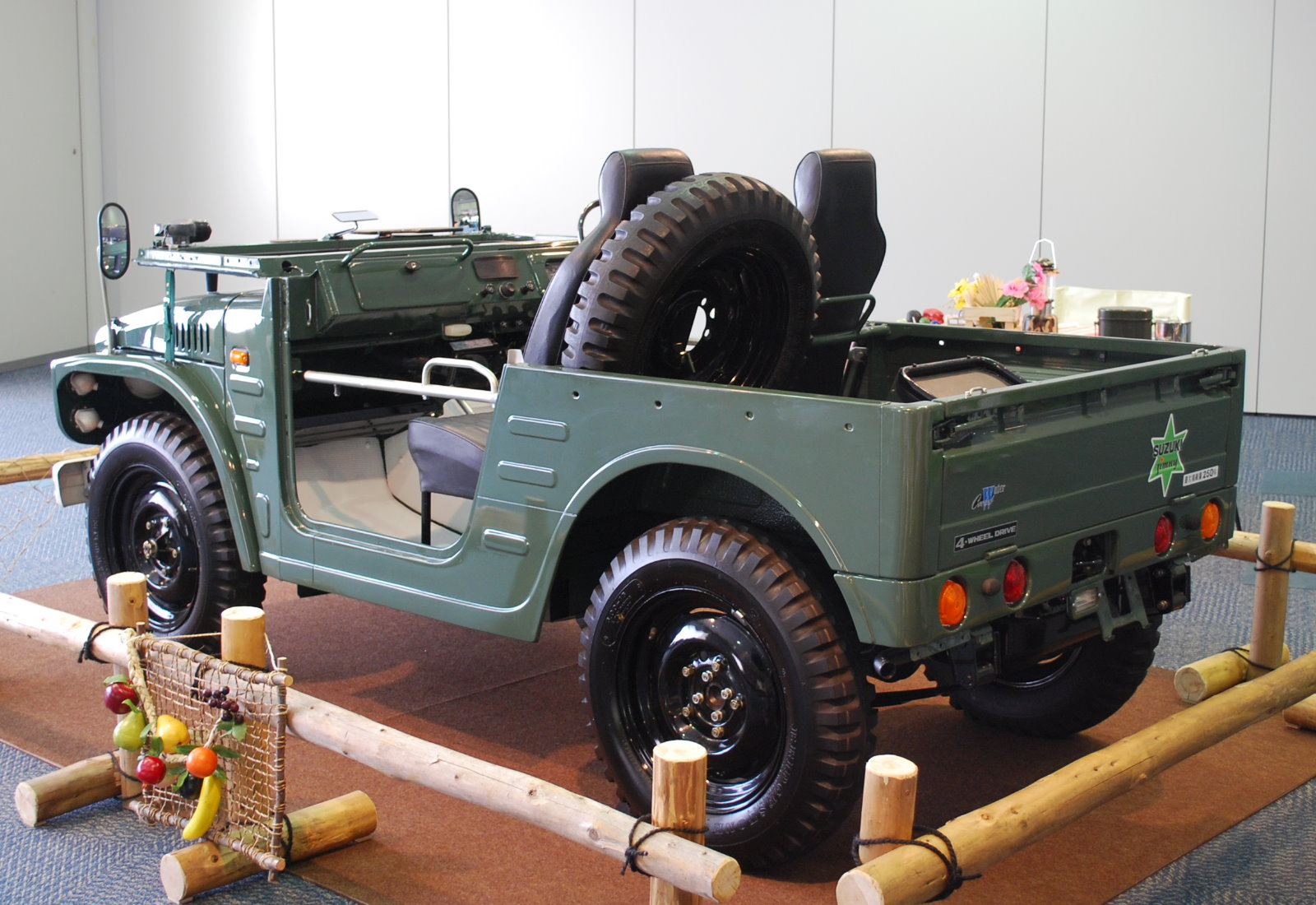
Suzuki Jimny LJ20 (1973), note spare tire placement

A special version with the spare tire mounted behind the passenger seat allowed for two small rear seats, facing each other. The introduction of left-hand drive signaled Suzuki's worldwide ambitions for the truck. The Hard Top (Van) was also introduced when the LJ20 arrived, equipped with smaller, 15 in wheels. Suzuki did not export them to America; a US company called International Equipment Co. imported them and sold them under the name "Suzuki Brute". Export Jimnys had the spare tire mounted on the outside, as kei regulations on length did not apply.

Towards the end of LJ20 production, a cleaner 26 PS (19 kW) engine was introduced, a result of having to meet ever more stringent emissions regulations. Top speed was reported as 93 km/h (58 mph), payload was 250 kg (550 lb) (200 kg [440 lb] for the Van version). Transmission gear ratios were 3.96:1 1st 2.38:1 2nd 1.52:1 3rd 1.00:1 4th and 3.96:1 rev.

=== SJ10 ===
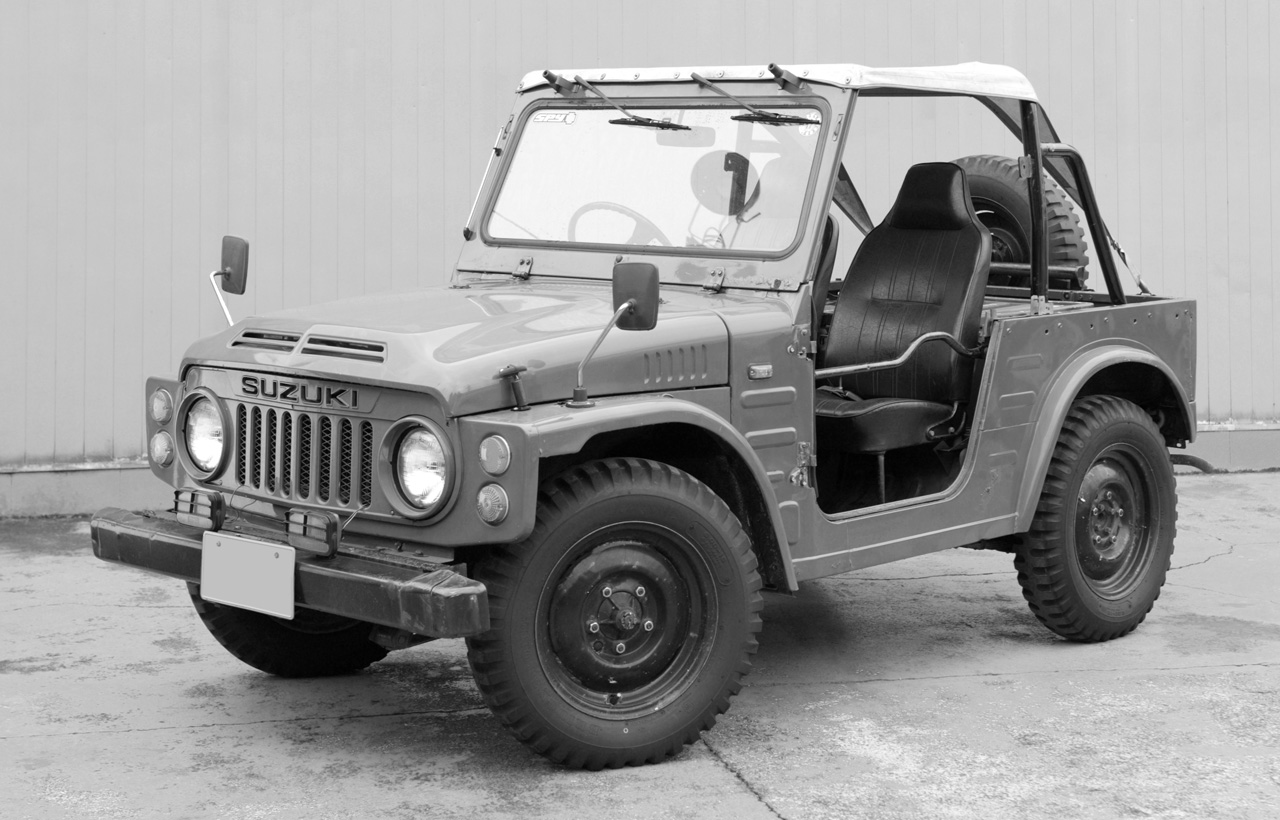
Suzuki Jimny 55 (SJ10)

The LJ50 engine was first introduced in September 1975 for export only, with 33 PS (24 kW) at 5500 rpm. For the home market, it first appeared in June 1976 as the Jimny 55 and reflected the changing kei-car rules and stricter emissions standards. The 539 cc (32.9 cu in) three-cylinder engine remained a two-stroke; while power was reduced to 26 PS (19 kW), more low-end torque was on offer. The 635 kg (1,400 lb) vehicle could reach 60 mph (97 km/h), and the spare tire was relocated outside the rear door, allowing for a fourth seat. The SJ10 Jimny originally used the "LJ50" name in most export markets; this was then changed to LJ55 with the introduction of the LJ80 to align the names.

In May 1976, the low-production LJ51P long-wheelbase pickup became available for some export markets. The home-market Jimny 550 received a facelift in 1977, introducing rear wheel-arch metal flares and a bigger bonnet or hood with cooling slots above the radiator, while the export LJ50s were instead replaced by the LJ80 (same external modifications, but with the new four-stroke, four-cylinder, 797-cc engine fitted).

In Australia, the LJ50S and LJ50V (van) were available as a soft-top with soft doors and rear-mounted spare wheel or hardtop with full metal doors and external spare wheel through distributor M.W.-Suzuki (Melbourne) with 33 hp (25 kW) and 57.4 N⋅m (5.85 kg⋅m; 42.3 lb⋅ft) of torque. The LJ50 became the first Suzuki automobile to be assembled in New Zealand, starting in late 1976 at an initial, modest rate of four cars per day.

=== SJ20 ===
The final iteration of the original Jimny design was the 1977 Jimny 8, called LJ80 in certain export markets. While the car was marketed in Japan, it was mainly developed for export markets and only 1,799 SJ20s were sold in the domestic market. It was originally intended to be marketed as the Eljot ("Elliott") in Germany, but copyright issues with Disney's Pete's Dragon movie made this impossible. While the SJ10 remained in production for the domestic kei category, the new 770 kg (1,698 lb) SJ20 boasted a 797 cc (48.6 cu in) four-stroke SOHC four-cylinder F8A engine capable of 41 PS (30 kW). This made it the first Suzuki automobile to be equipped with a four-stroke engine. The additional power and torque of this engine allowed the differential and gearing to be raised for better cruising and offroad performance, and the track was widened by 100 mm (3.9 in). The LJ80 and LJ81 were also assembled in Whanganui, New Zealand, while the LJ80V was assembled in Indonesia, by P.T. Indo Mobil Utama in Jakarta.

The interior was also improved, with new seats and steering wheel. Metal doors became available for the first time in 1979, and a pickup truck model (LJ81) was available by April of that year, as well. A roll bar was an extra cost option for convertible models most years with the exception of some early models. The pickup had a 2,200 mm (86.6 in) wheelbase – up by 270 mm (10.6 in) – and was 3,620 mm (142.5 in) long, compared to the 3,185 mm (125.4 in) LJ80. The Jimny 8/LJ80 was retired in late 1981 with the introduction of the second-generation Jimny. Transmission gear ratios were 3.83:1 1st 2.35:1 2nd 1.54:1 3rd 1.00:1 4th and 4.02:1 rev on both SJ10 and SJ20. Transfer case gear ratios were 2.57:1 low and 1.56:1 high or 3.01:1 low and 1.71:1 high depending on year. Axle gear ratios were 4.55:1 4.87:1 or 5.66:1 depending on year.

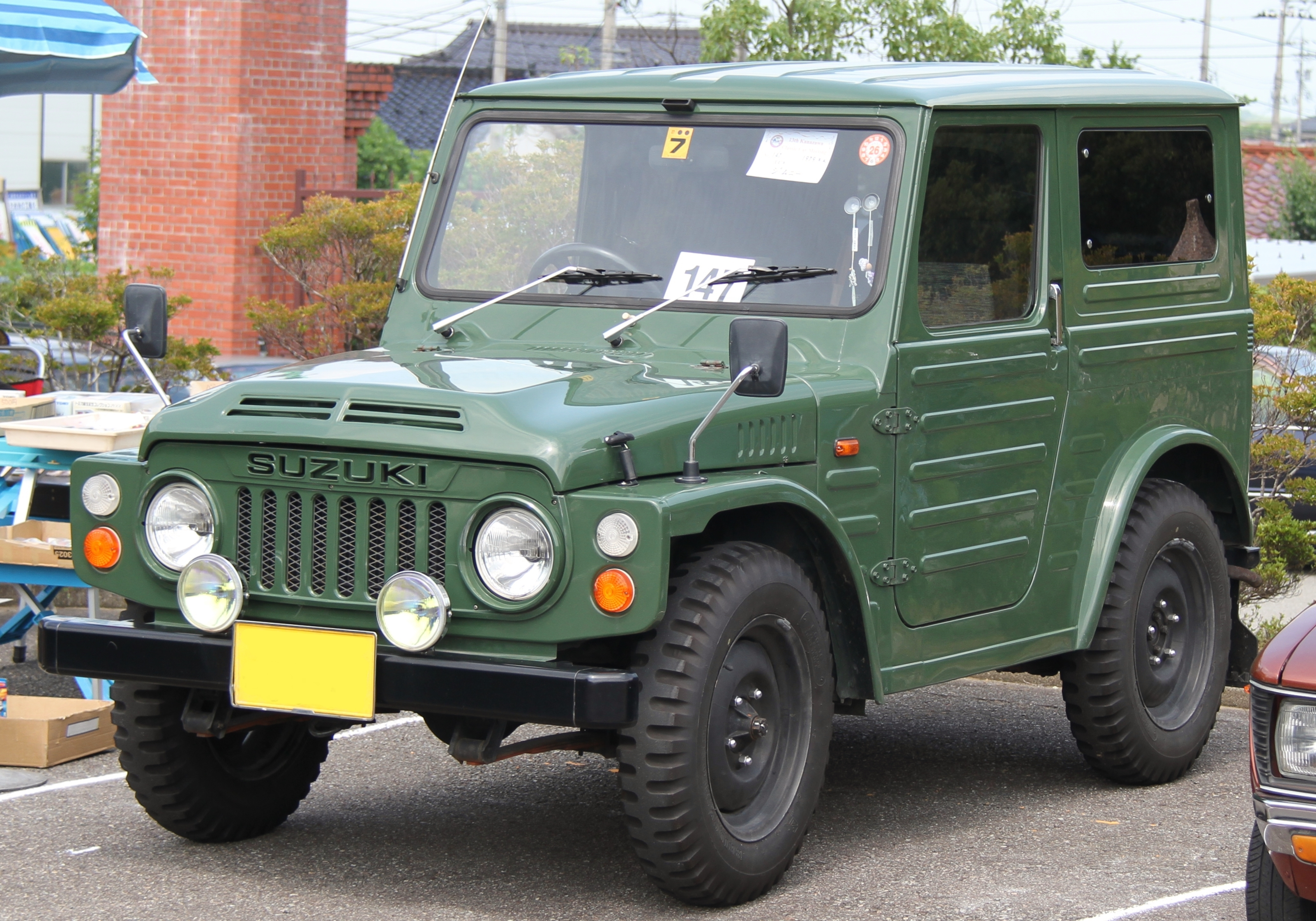
1979 Suzuki Jimny SJ20 hardtop (JDM)

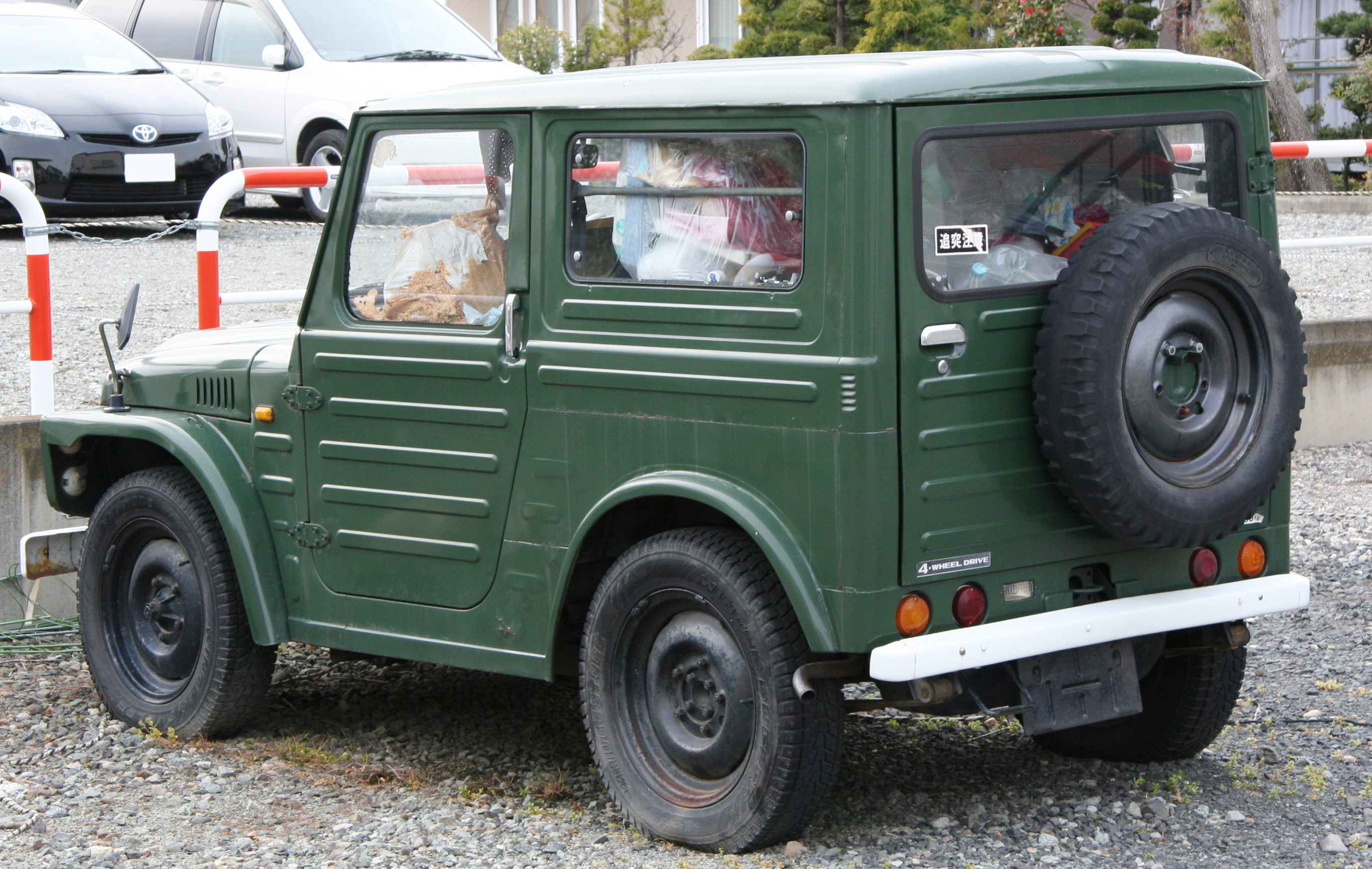
Rear view

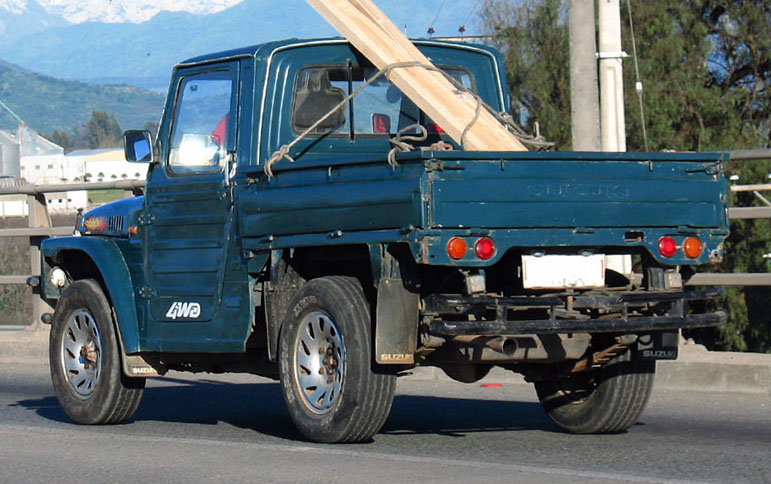
Suzuki LJ81 pickup

== Second generation (1981) ==
Second generation
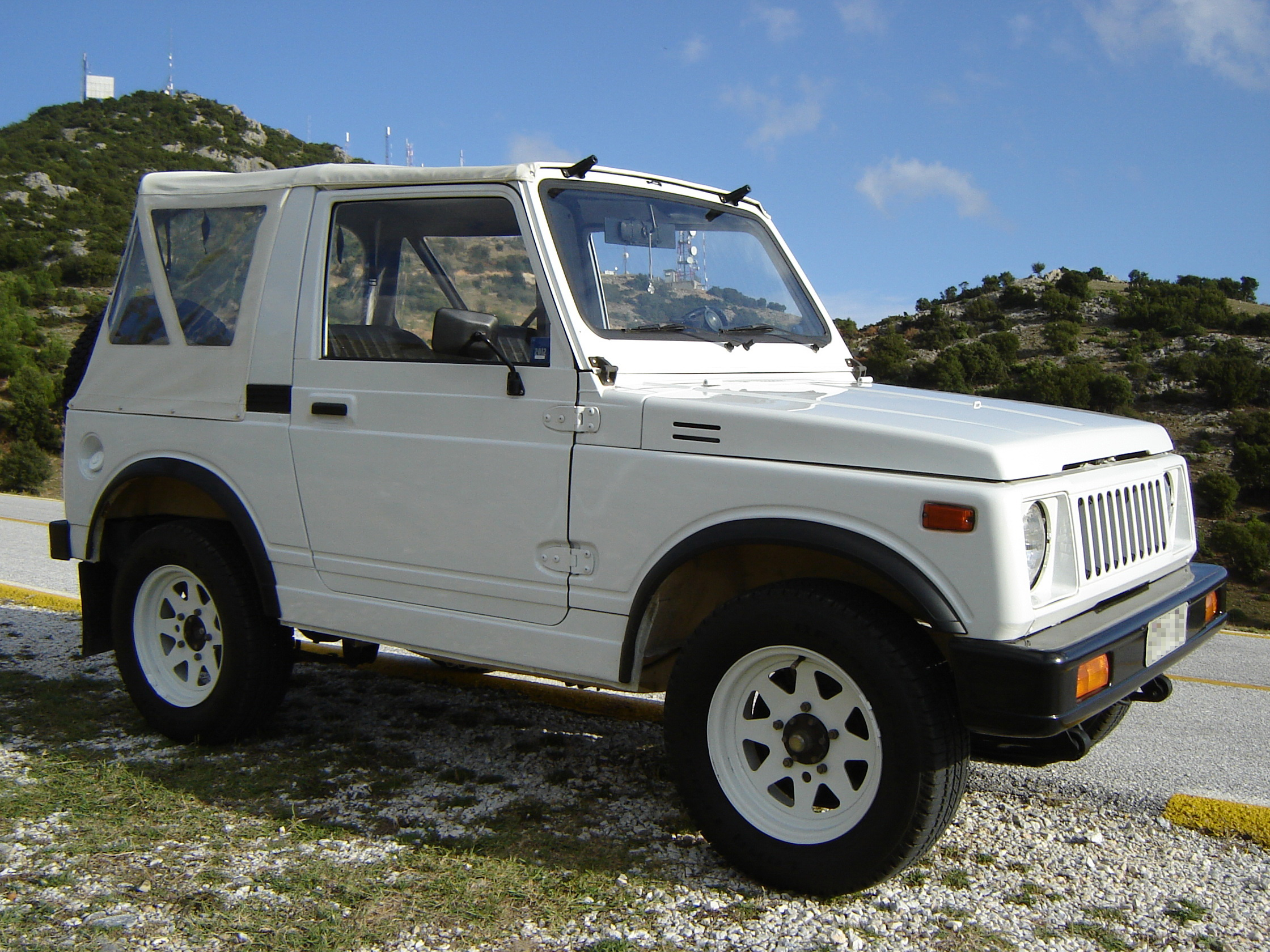

Overview
- Model code: SJ30/40/50/51/80; JA11/12/22/51/72; JB31
- Also called: Suzuki Caribian (Thailand); Suzuki Farm Worker (New Zealand); Suzuki Fox (Iceland); Suzuki Katana (Indonesia); Suzuki Potohar (Pakistan); Suzuki Samurai; Suzuki SJ408/410/413; Suzuki Santana (Europe); Suzuki Sierra (Australia); Suzuki Stockman (Australia); Suzuki Super Jimny (Indonesia); Chevrolet Samurai (Colombia); Holden Drover (Australia); Maruti Gypsy; Santana S-410/413 (Europe); Santana 1000 (Taiwan); Santana Samurai (Europe)
- Production: 1981–1998 (Japan); 1982–2007 (Indonesia); 1984–2006 (Pakistan); 1985–2004 (Spain); 1985–2018 (India); 1988–2006 (Thailand)
- Assembly: Japan: Iwata; Colombia: Bogotá (GM Colombia); India: Gurgaon (Maruti Suzuki); Indonesia: Bekasi (Indomobil Niaga International); Kenya: Nairobi (Cooper Motor Corporation); Pakistan: Karachi (Pak Suzuki Motors); Spain: Linares (Santana Motor); Thailand: Bangkok (Siam International Corporation Limited)

Body and chassis
- Body style: 2-door convertible; 2-door pickup truck; 3-door SUV/van

Powertrain
- Engine: Petrol: 539 cc LJ50 2-stroke I3; 547 cc F5A turbo I3; 657 cc F6A turbo I3; 658 cc K6A turbo I3; 797 cc F8A I4; 970 cc F10A I4; 1,298 cc G13BA I4; 1,298 cc G13BB I4; 1,324 cc G13A I4; Diesel (Santana only): 1,870 cc Renault F8Q I4; 1,905 cc Peugeot XUD9 turbodiesel I4
- Transmission: 4/5-speed manual; 3-speed automatic (Japan)

Dimensions
- Wheelbase: SWB: 2,030 mm (79.9 in); LWB: 2,375 mm (93.5 in)
- Length: Kei car: 3,195–3,295 mm (125.8–129.7 in); SWB: 3,355–3,510 mm (132.1–138.2 in); LWB: 3,885–4,125 mm (153.0–162.4 in)
- Width: Kei car: 1,395 mm (54.9 in); Regular: 1,425–1,545 mm (56.1–60.8 in)
- Height: Low-roof: 1,665–1,730 mm (65.6–68.1 in); High-roof: 1,815–1,845 mm (71.5–72.6 in)
- Curb weight: Kei car: 730–930 kg (1,609.4–2,050.3 lb); Regular: 805–1,120 kg (1,774.7–2,469.2 lb)

Chronology
- Successor: Suzuki Sidekick (Canada); Suzuki X-90 (United States)

=== Kei history ===
==== 550 cc era ====
The SJ30 Jimny 550 began its production in May 1981 and was mainly for Japanese domestic market consumption where it suited the Kei car category. Still powered by the LJ50 engine also used in its predecessor, the Jimny 550 was the last two-stroke automobile built in Japan by a sizable margin. The two-stroke had been favored by Japanese off-roaders (and Suzuki) due to its light weight and superior low-speed torque.

In January 1986 the JA71, a four-stroke, turbocharged and fuel-injected (F5A) 543 cc (33 cu in) three-cylinder engine was introduced to complement the two-stroke SJ30. It used the upgraded interior from the Jimny 1300, which was simultaneously introduced to the SJ30. Power was 42 PS (31 kW; 41 hp) (JIS gross), although this was increased to 52 PS (38 kW; 51 hp) (JIS Net) in a November 1987 facelift by adding an intercooler. The non-intercooled engine continued to be offered in the lowest spec commercial van version. Claimed power was down to 38 PS (28 kW; 37 hp) as the ratings were switched from gross to net. At the same time, a glassed high-roof version ("Panoramic Roof") was added.

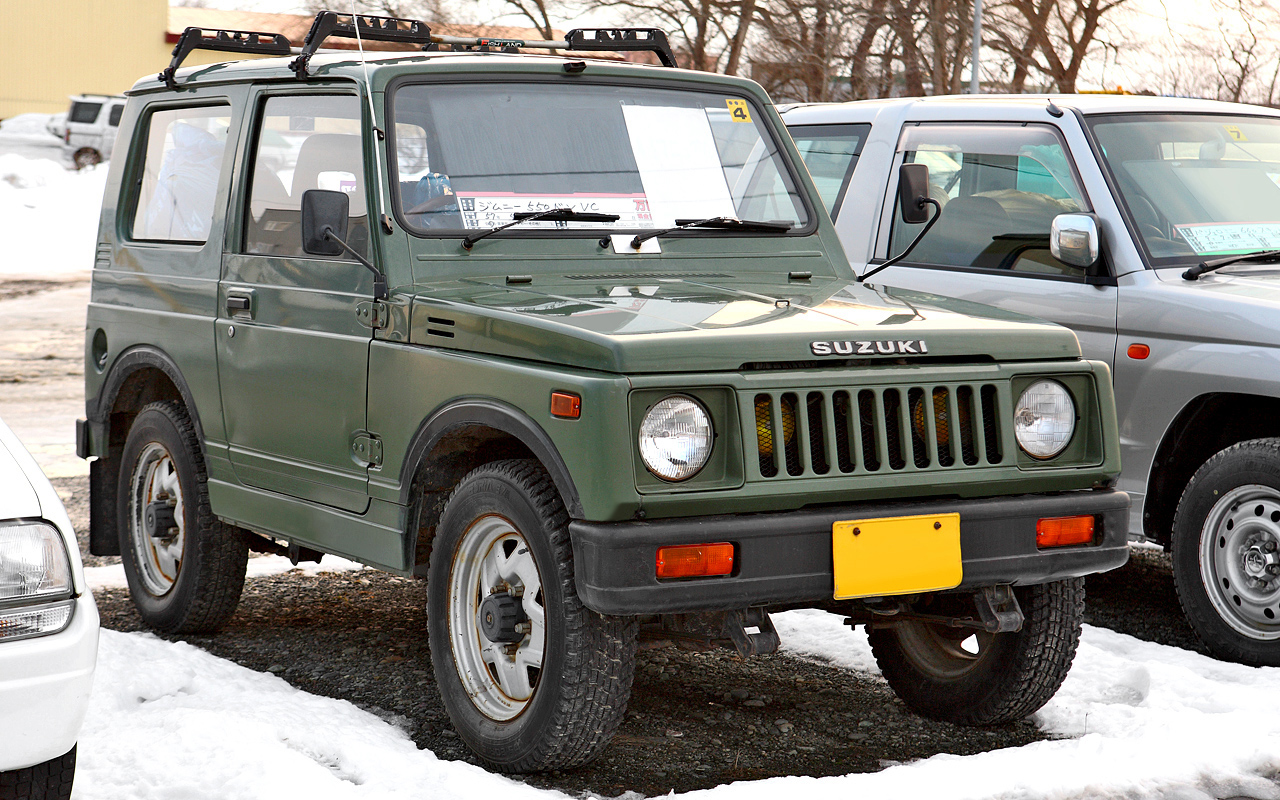
1981–1987 Suzuki Jimny SJ30 series

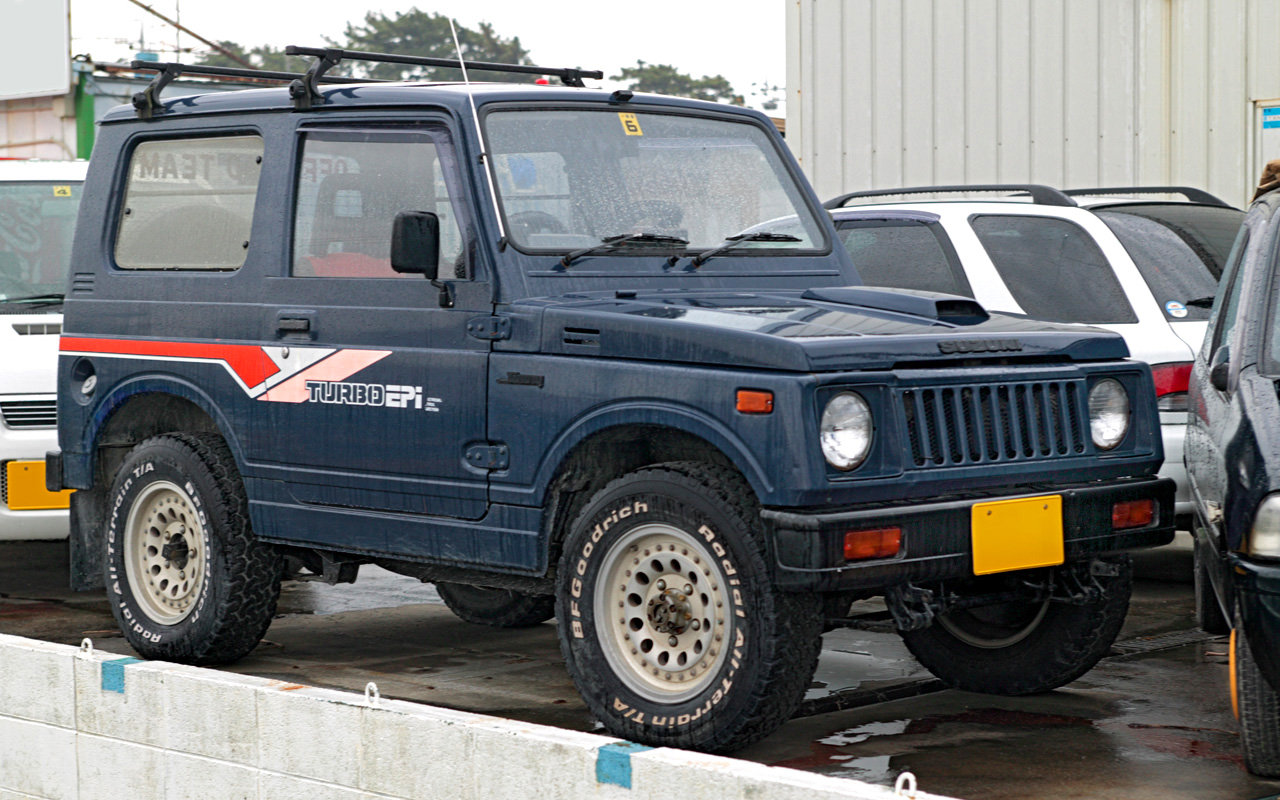
1986–1987 Suzuki Jimny JA71 series

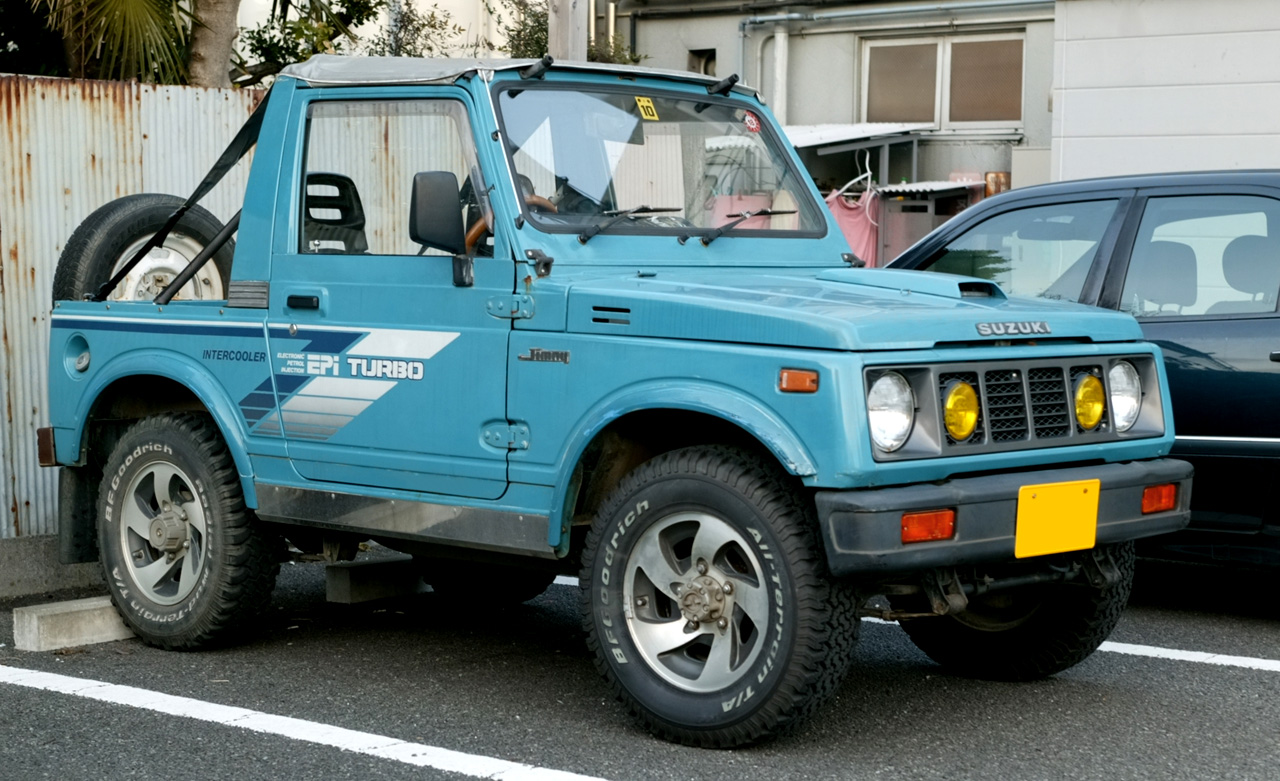
1987–1990 Suzuki Jimny JA71 series

==== 660 cc era ====
The JA71 was replaced in March 1990 by the new JA11 as new Kei category regulations took effect. With the 657 cc on offer, the otherwise similar F6A engine only came with an intercooler and 55 PS (40 kW; 54 hp). A utilitarian van (HA), as well as more luxurious Hardtop, Convertible, and Panoramic Roof (HC, CC, EC) versions were on offer. The suspension was also upgraded, while a longer front bumper meant that the foglights could be mounted in front of the grille rather than in it. In June 1991, power was increased to 58 PS (43 kW; 57 hp) and a year later power steering and a three-speed automatic transmission option became available for the first time. Top speed of this version was 120 km/h (75 mph). In February 1995 power increased to 64 PS (47 kW; 63 bhp), but production of the JA11 ended only nine months later with the introduction of the coil spring JA12/22.

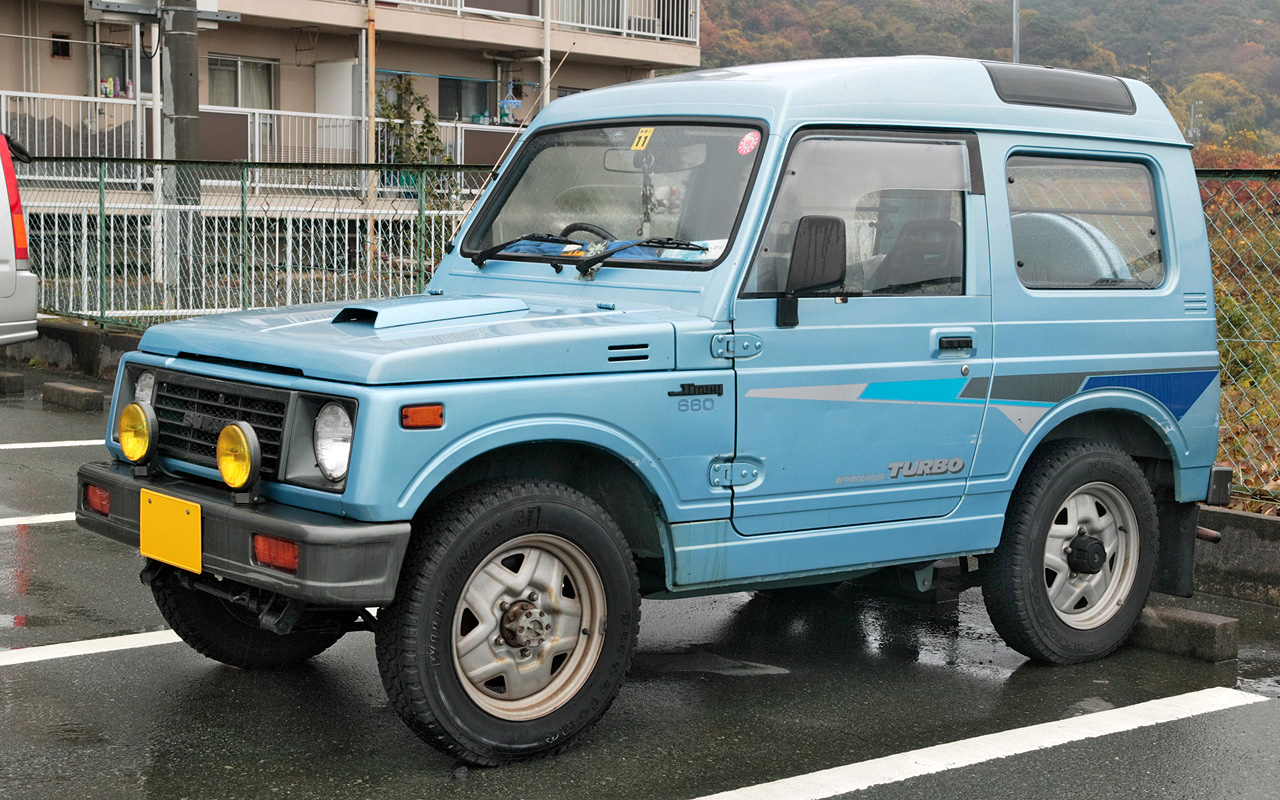
1990–1991 Suzuki Jimny JA11 series

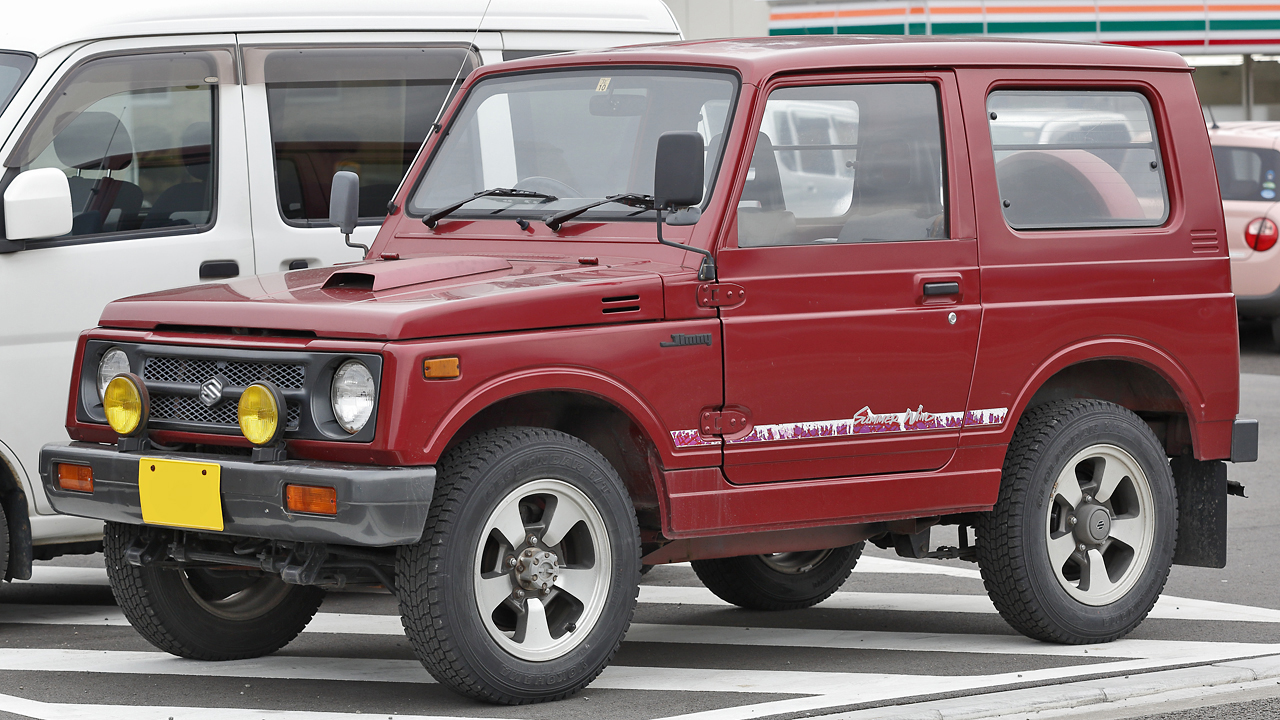
1991–1995 Suzuki Jimny JA11 series

==== Coil spring edition ====
The Jimny received a substantial update in November 1995, where the newer version is referred to as the "Coily". This included a coil spring suspension, though both live axles were retained. The rest of the SUV was redesigned as well, with new seats, dashboard, steering wheel, doors bumpers, and front grille.

There were two Jimny coil sprung models.

- The JA12 used the 657 cc (40 cu in) F6A three-cylinder engine from the JA11.
- The JA22 received the newly developed and more powerful DOHC K6A engine.

Additional notes:

- In order to abide by the Kei car regulations, claimed output was limited to 64 PS (47 kW; 63 hp) for both engines used in JA12 and JA22, although the K6A produced considerably higher torque than the F6A.
- Some vehicle parts are specific to coil sprung Jimnys compared to leaf sprung Jimnys, and even later Jimny models - most suspension parts, transfer cases, several body panels, as well as most interior and exterior trim pieces.
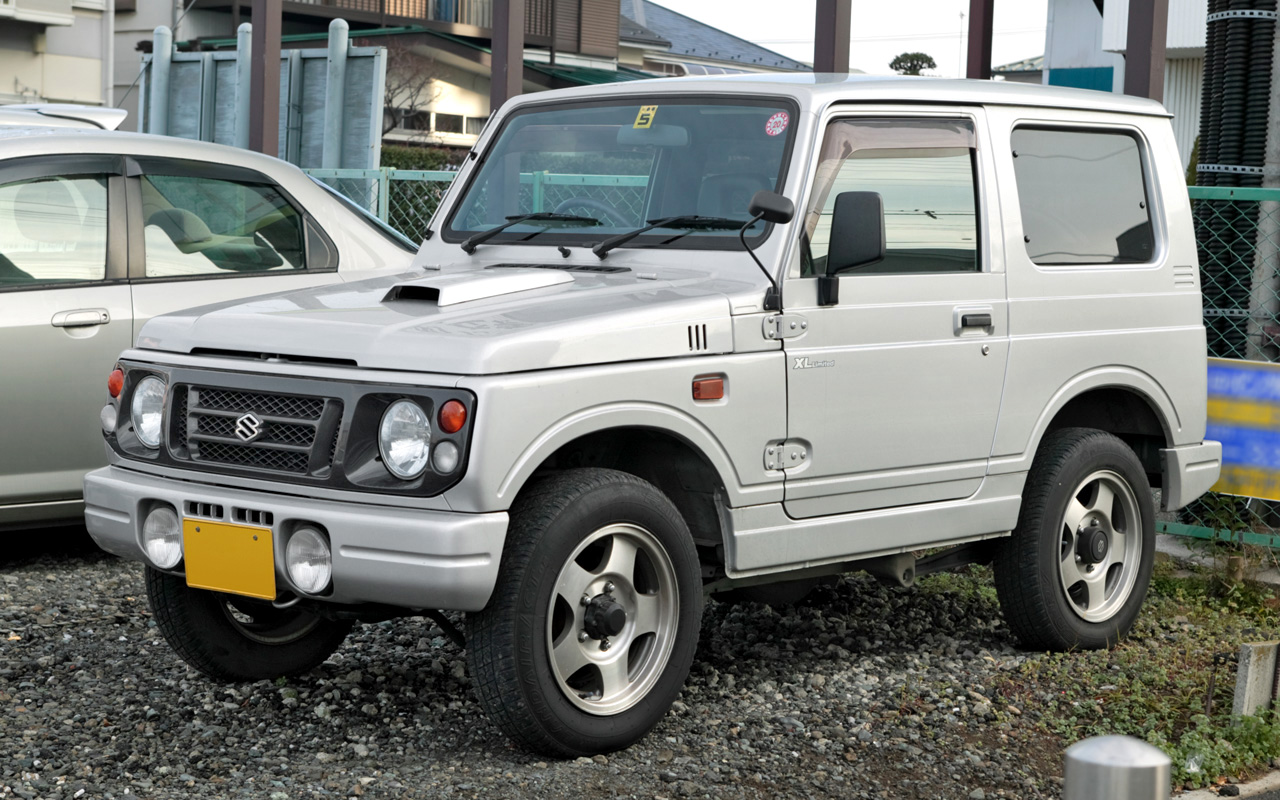
1995–1998 Suzuki Jimny JA12/22 series

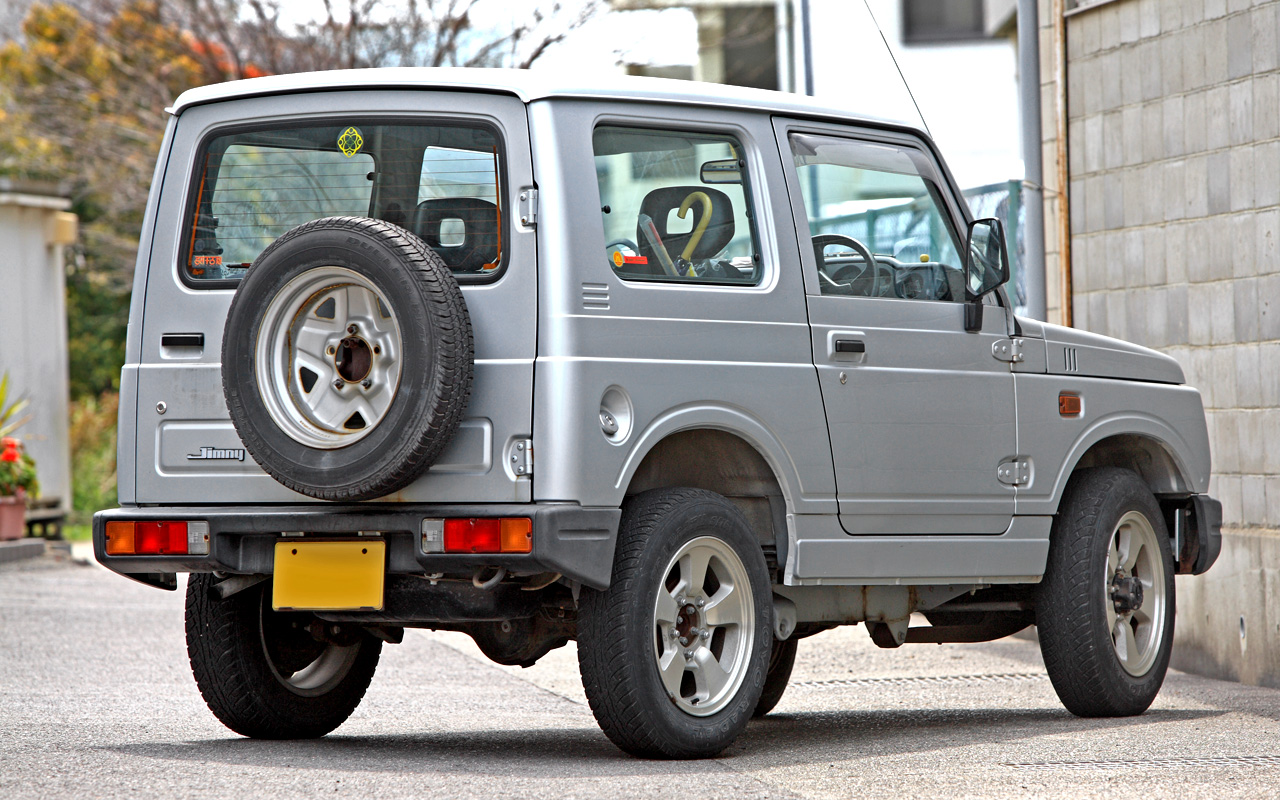
Rear view

=== Regular models ===
The SJ40 Jimny 1000 was introduced in Japan in August 1982 to replace the older LJ80 range, and sold as the SJ410 in most export markets (Sierra in Australia) as early as summer 1981, powered by the F10A four-cylinder engine. This engine produced 45 PS (33 kW; 44 hp) (net) and it had a top speed of 68 mph (109 km/h). The Japanese market models claimed 52 PS (38 kW; 51 hp) (gross) at 5,000 rpm. A four-speed manual transmission was standard, as were non-power assisted drum brakes front and rear. The SJ410 came as a half/full-door soft top convertible, a three-door hard top (called "van" in Japan) with low-roof, high-roof hard top, or no-glass (panel van) versions and a long-wheelbase (LWB) pickup truck with wellside or dropside beds. In Japan, the pickup truck was intended as a bare-bones work vehicle and did not receive fender extensions, and had diagonal tires on 16-inch (15-inch for export) black-painted steel wheels rather than the sportier wheels fitted to the regular Jimny. Maximum payload is 350 kg (772 lb) and was only offered with a dropside stye bed. Also unique for Japanese market, the Jimny 1000 had 6-bolt pattern wheels as opposed of 5-bolt like the Kei and export models, although they shared the same 139.7 mm (5.5 in) PCD. This was because the Japanese ministry of transportation dictated that Suzuki fit wheels with a different bolt pattern, so that owners of Kei Jimnys would not be able to retrofit the larger, wider wheels of the Jimny 1000 to their cars.

In the autumn of 1983, the LWB model was expanded with additional two-door soft top convertible and three-door removable hard top (station wagon/estate) versions. These new LWB models still had only two rear seats (if fitted at all) for two rear passengers, and the rear passenger leg room was the same as in the standard SWB edition. The extended vehicle length only affected the boot space, which was significantly larger in the LWB edition. In Japan, only the SWB model was offered until the end of this generation.

In November 1984, the Jimny 1000/SJ410 was revamped with the launch of the Jimny 1300 in Japan (designated as JA51 series and still with the 6-bolt pattern) or as SJ413 for international market (internal model code SJ50). The JA51/SJ50 series included a larger 1.3-litre (1,324 cc) G13A four-cylinder engine, 5-speed manual transmission and power brakes (disc brakes on the front and drum brakes on the rear) all around. The body and interior were also redesigned, with the introduction of an anti-roll bar, along with a new dashboard, seats, bonnet and grille. The SJ410 remained in production for various other markets with the old specification and appearance, although there was a version with the new interior, front disc brakes and a five-speed manual option positioned between the original SJ410 and SJ413 for certain markets.

SJ413 had the same track width as SJ410, but can be distinguished by the different grille and bonnet. As those two car models were relatively susceptible to a rollover, Suzuki introduced a wider edition of SJ413 around 1988, with its track widened by 90 mm (3.5 in), giving the vehicle more stability. This wider edition received the nameplate "Samurai" (derived from samurai warriors), which was introduced first in 1985 in North America. The difference in width is the only major difference between SJ and Samurai, apart from some minor cosmetic changes in the interior and the exterior. The Samurais were generally powered by SJ413's 1.3-litre engine, although SJ410's 1.0-litre engine was also offered for certain markets. This early Samurai was not available in Japan due the discontinuation of Jimny 1300 and the arrival of Escudo in 1988.

The Samurai received another improvement in late 1991 or early 1992 with another facelift and a new 1.3-litre (1,298 cc) G13BA engine (available with throttle-body fuel injection or carburettor depending on the market) and redesignated as the SJ51 series. In May 1993, the regular Jimny was returned to the Japanese market as the Jimmy 1300 Sierra, based on the updated Samurai and was given the JB31 model code. The wheels were also changed to the common 5-bolt pattern and an optional three-speed automatic transmission that was not offered for export. In November 1995, the regular Jimny was also received the coil sprung update like the Kei models, designated as JB32 series. It featured a more advanced sixteen-valve multi-point fuel injected 1.3-litre G13BB engine, producing 85 PS (63 kW; 84 hp). This model also bears the designation SJ80 in export markets (such as in Central and Eastern Europe, Turkey, South America and Australia), and sold between 1996 and 1998 as Samurai/Sierra. This export model was still powered with the older throttle-body fuel injected/carburetted eight-valve G13BA engine instead. Unlike the earlier versions, the JB32/SJ80 series were only offered with a SWB configuration.

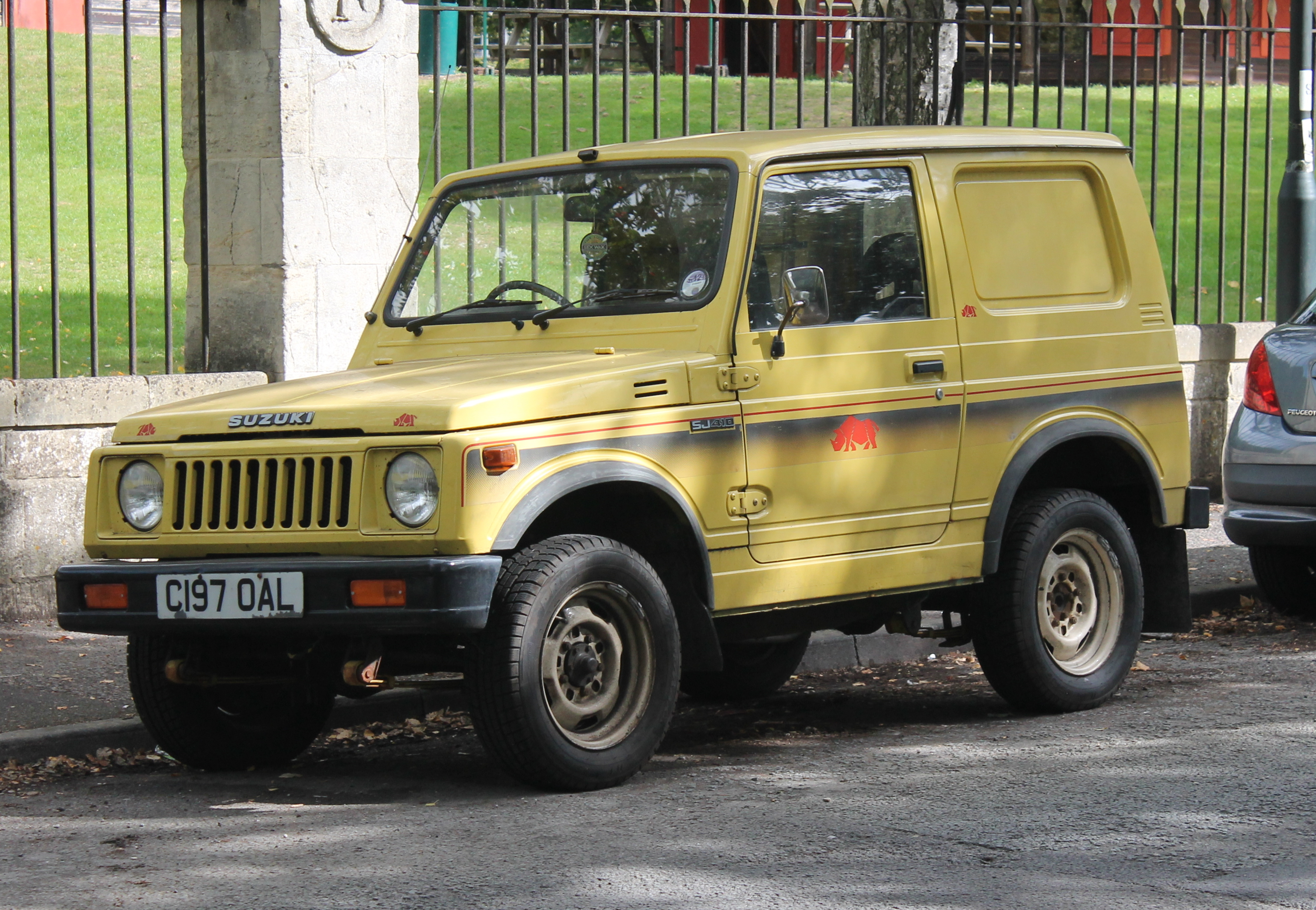
1982–1988 Suzuki SJ410

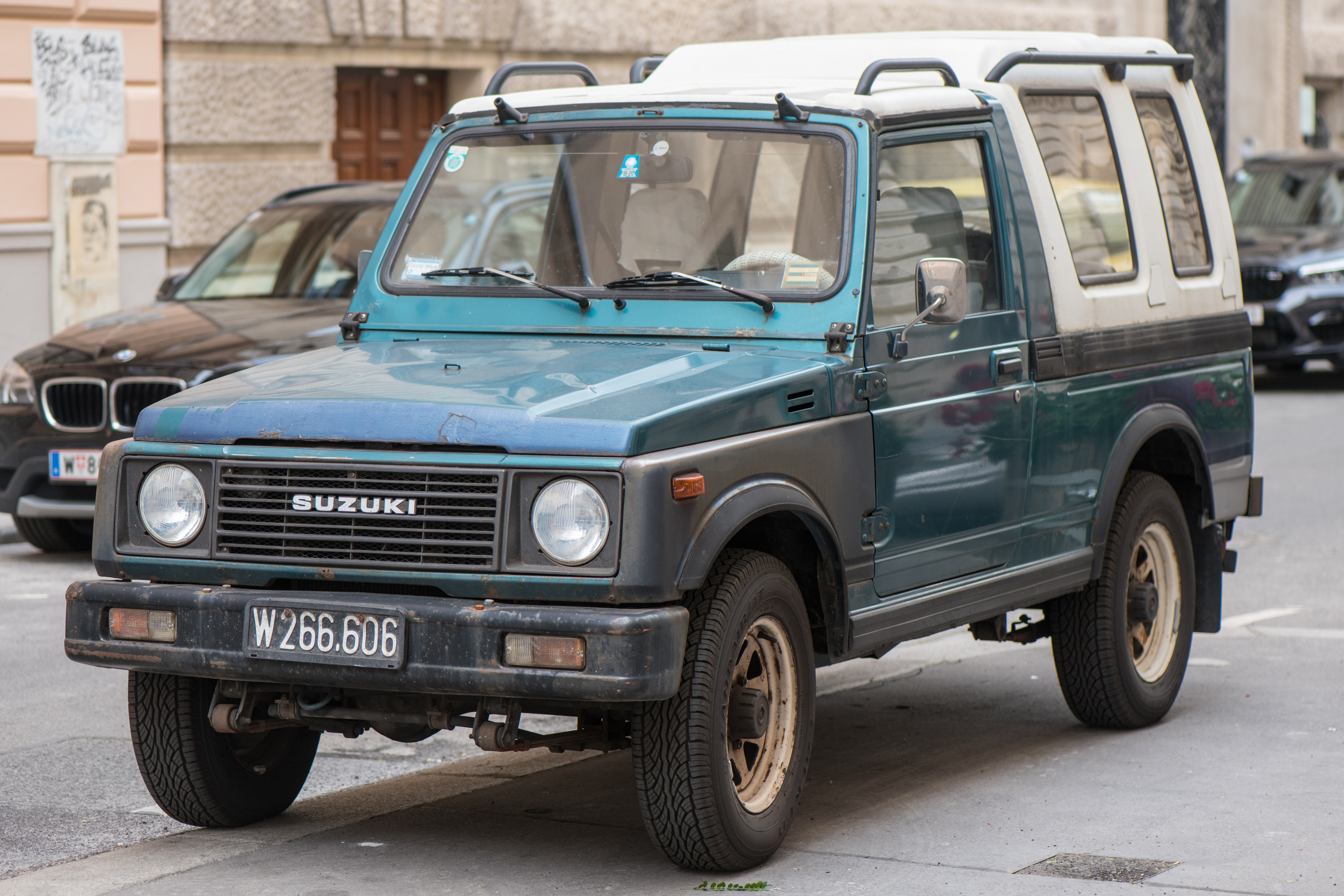
1984–1988 Suzuki SJ413

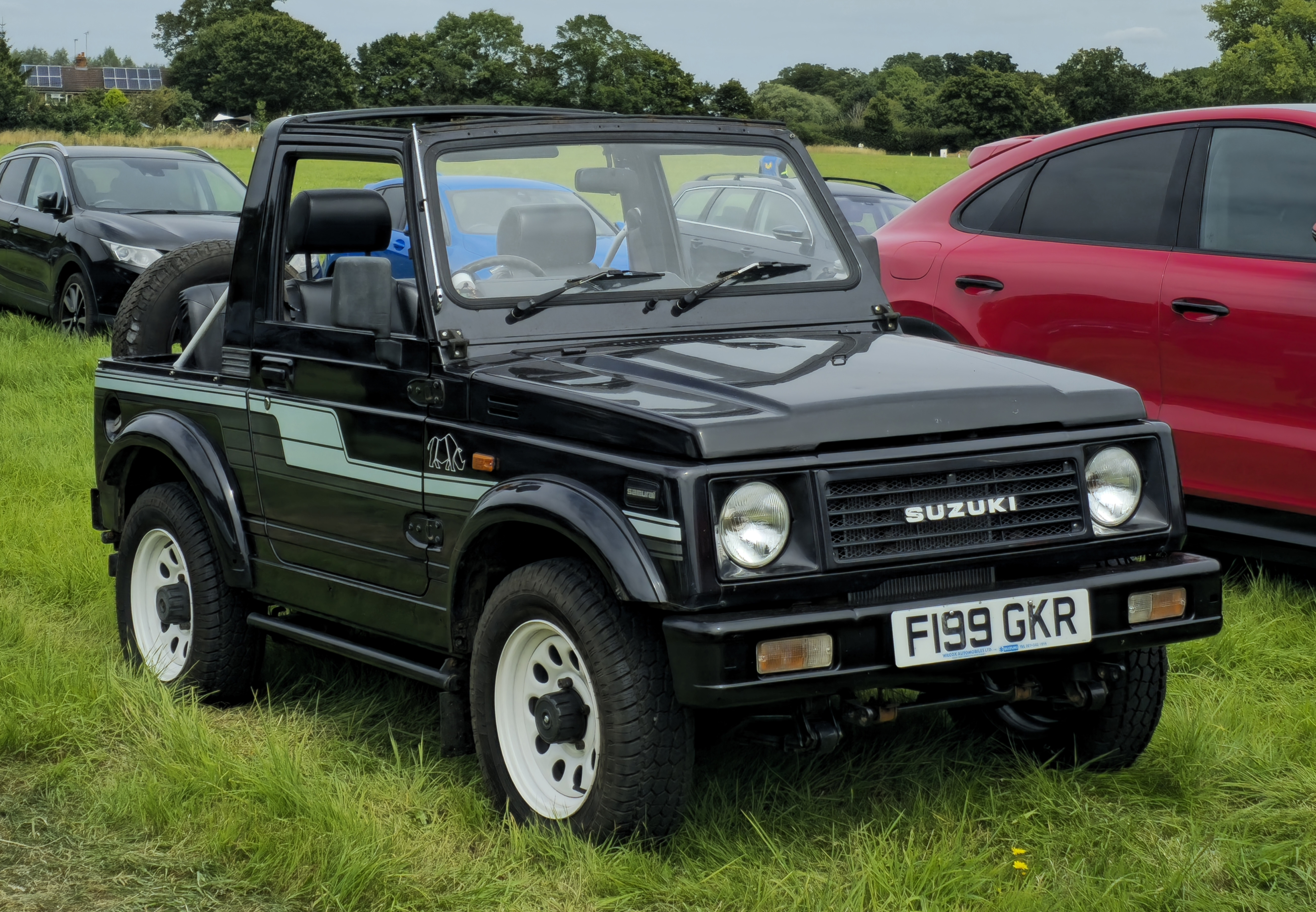
1988–1992 Suzuki Samurai

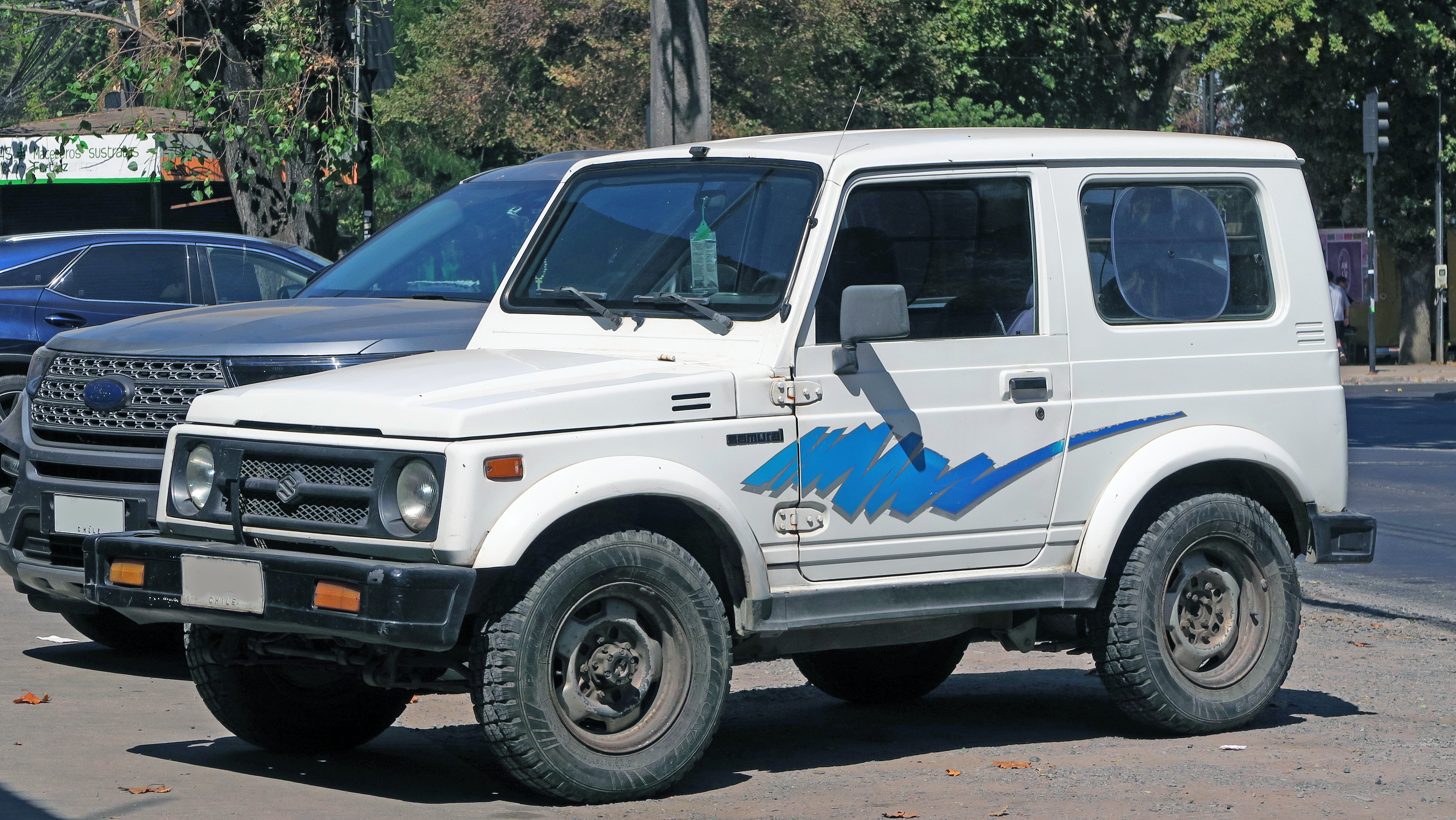
1992–1996 Suzuki Samurai

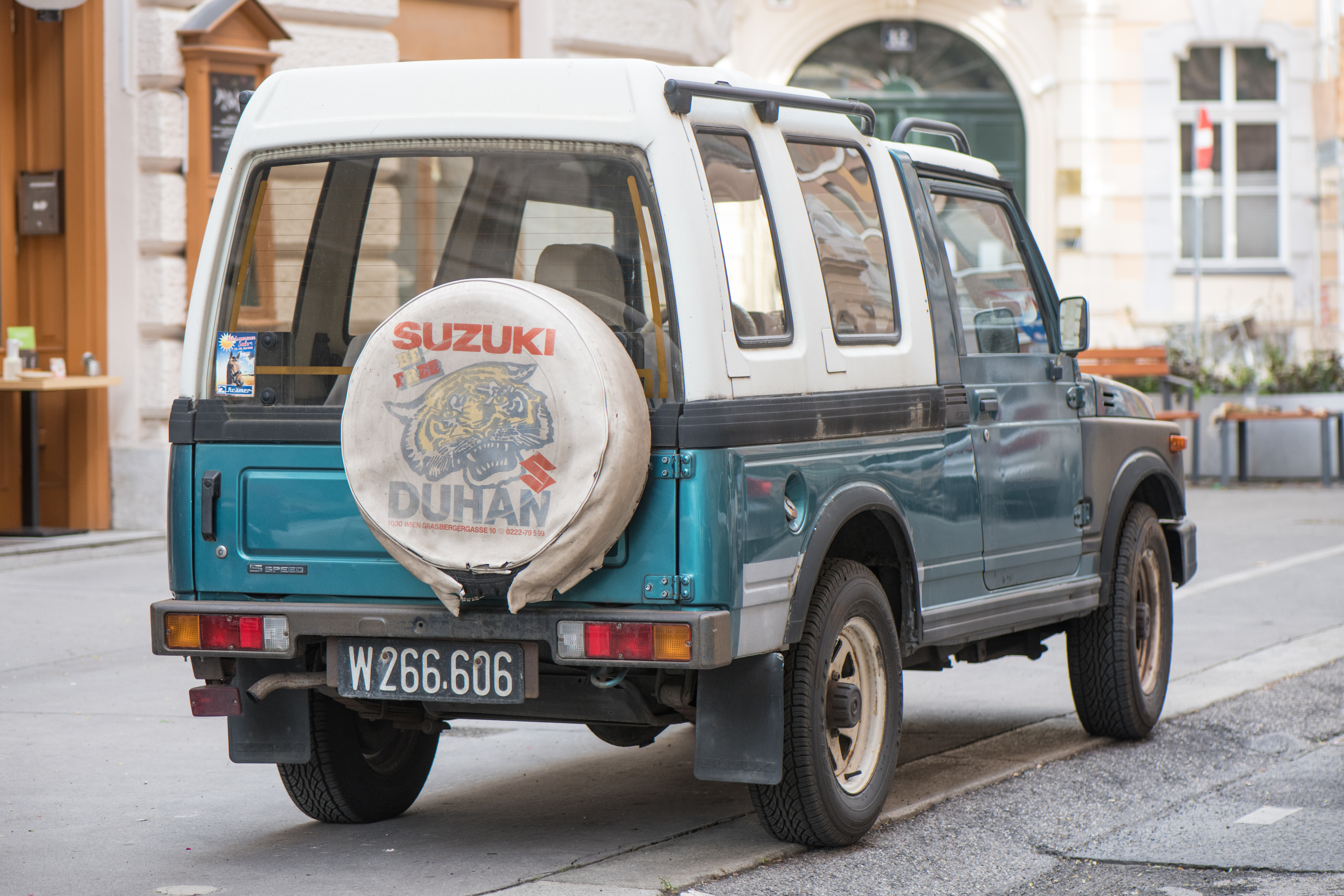
Rear view of the removable hard top

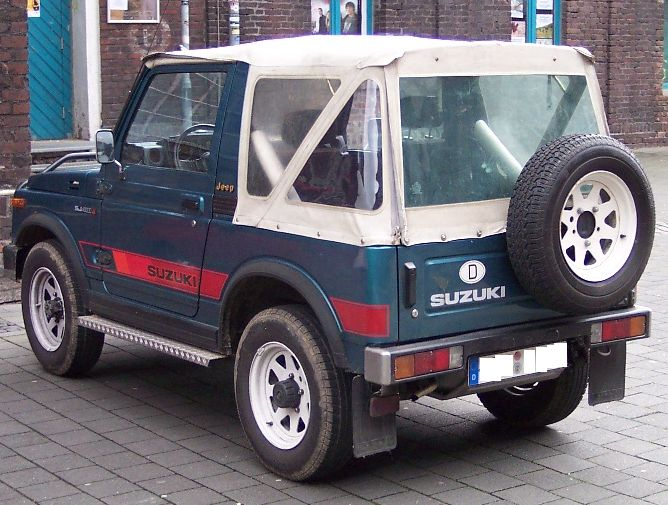
Rear view of the soft top convertible

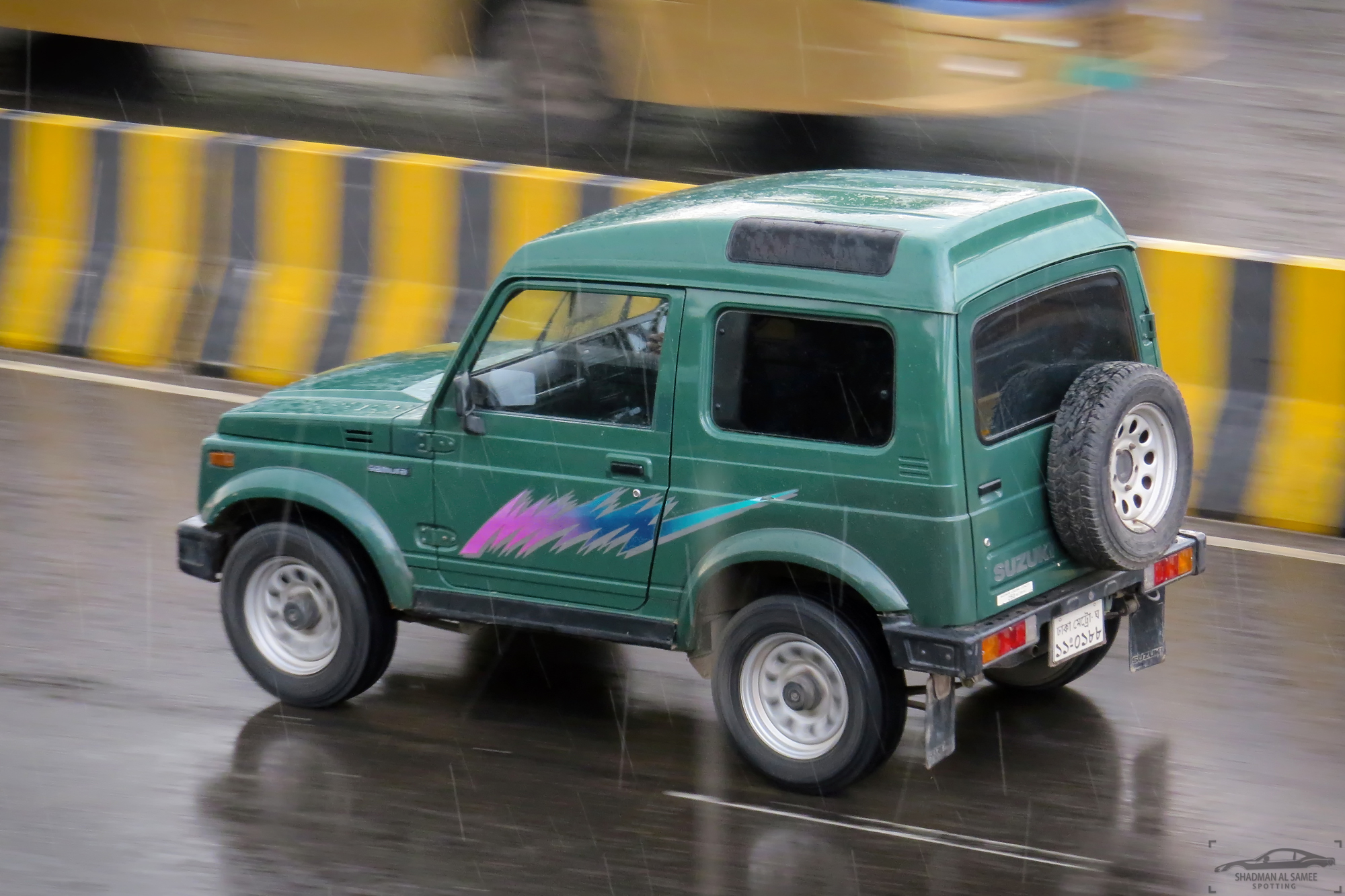
Rear view of the "metal top" hard top high roof

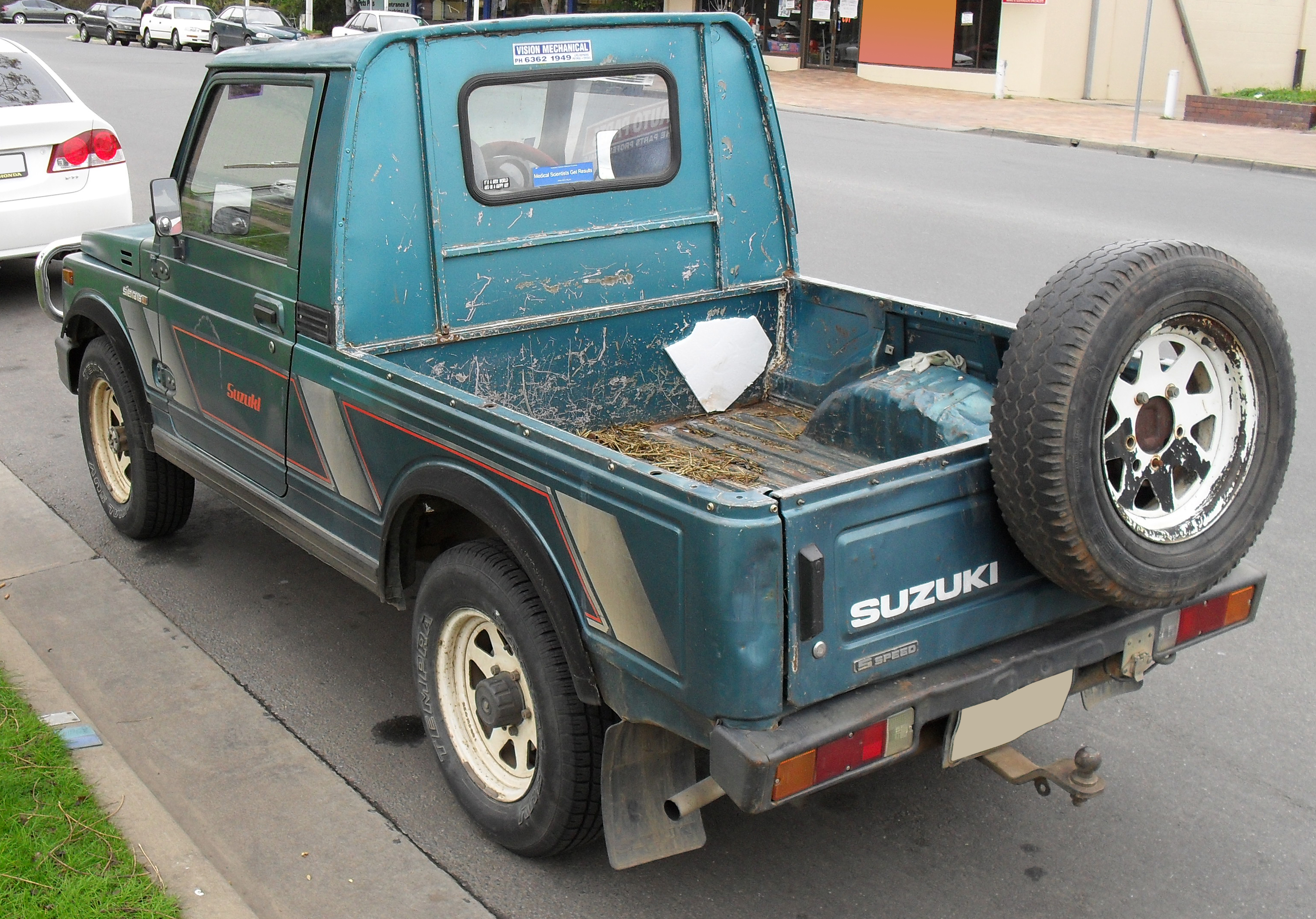
Rear view of the pickup truck

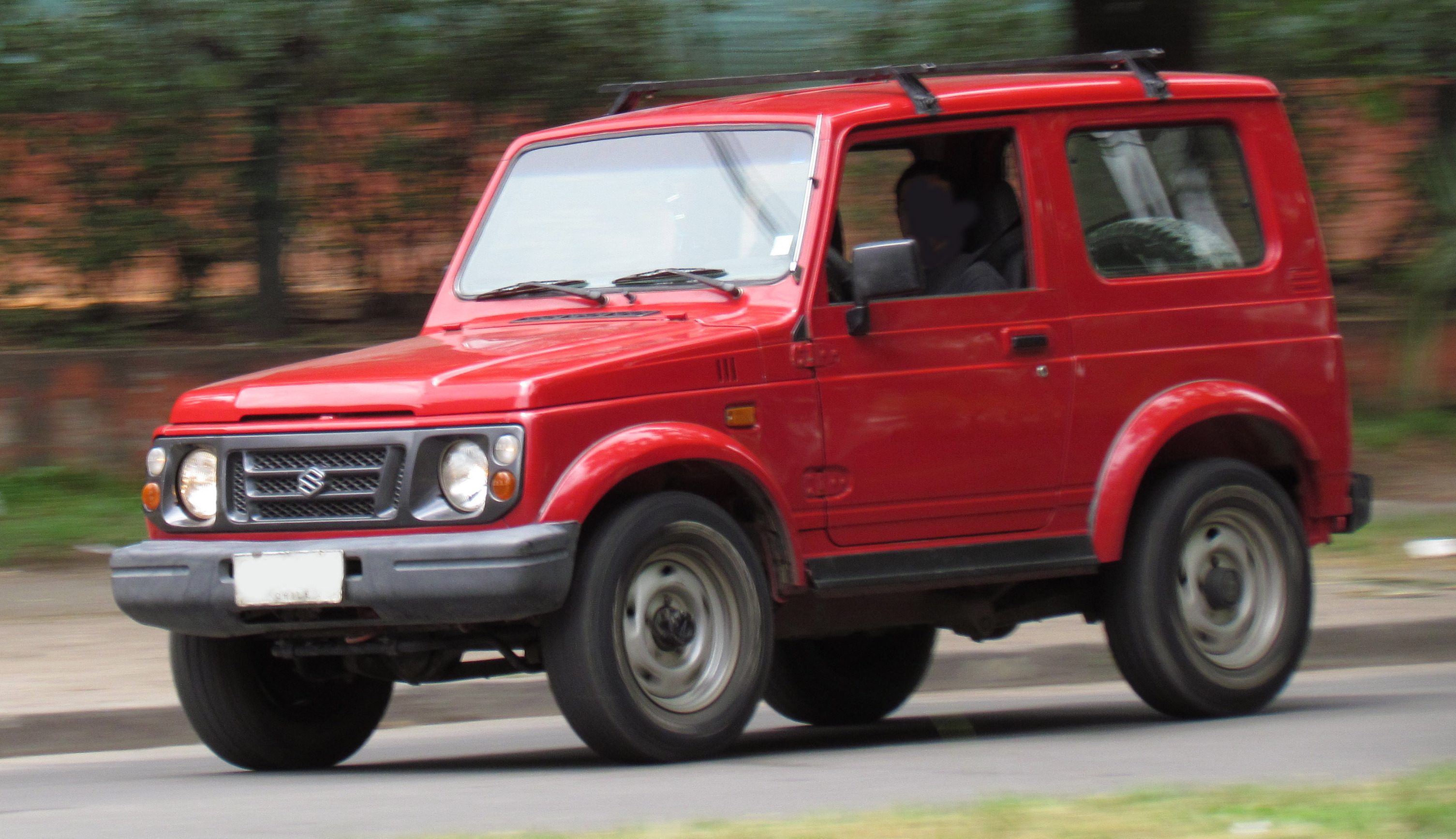
1995–1998 Suzuki Jimny/Samurai "Coily"

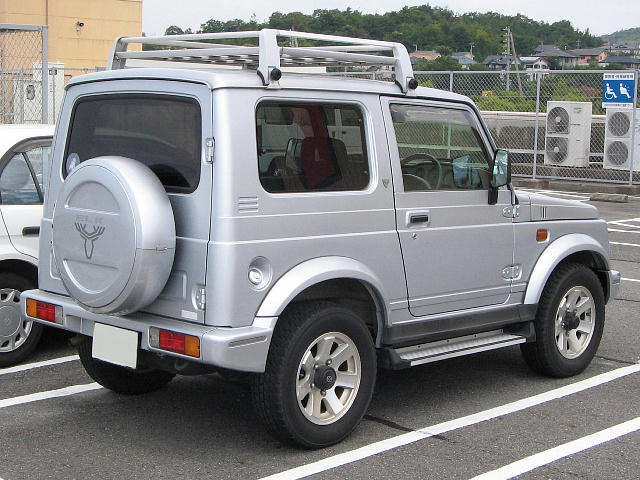
Rear view of the JB32/SJ80 series

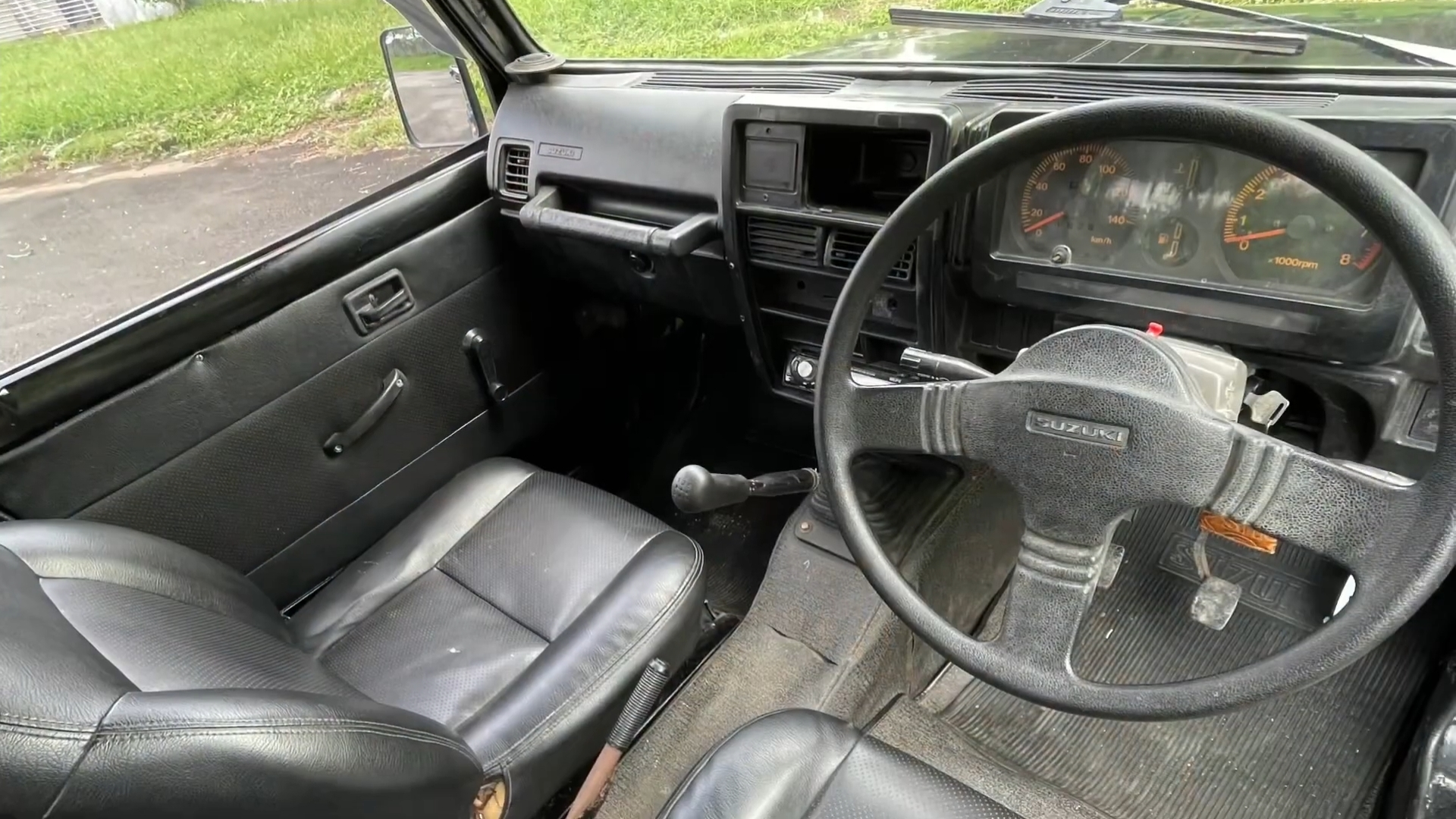
1988–1995 dashboard

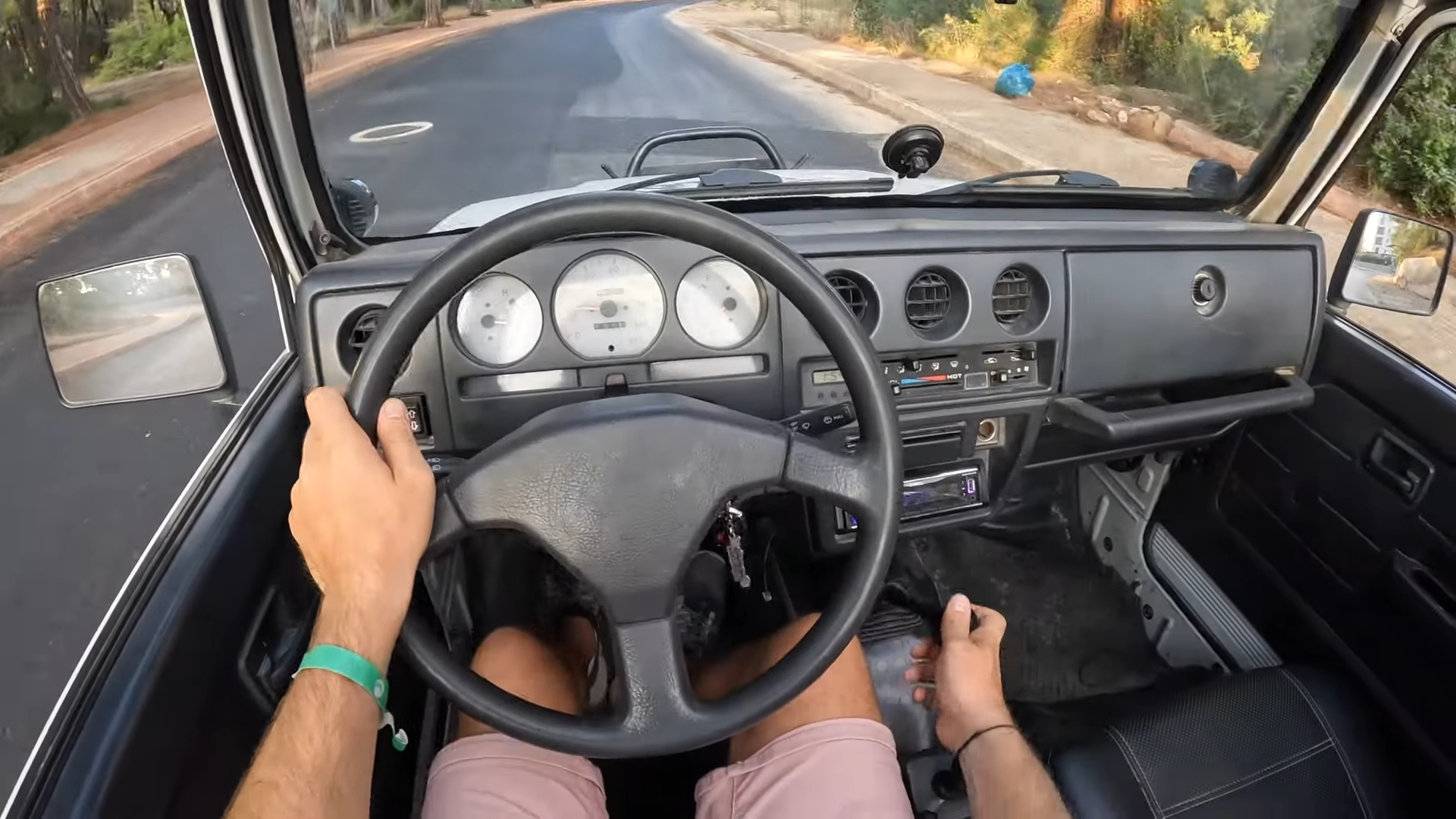
1995–2004 dashboard

=== Other markets ===
The SJs were also produced in Spain by Santana Motor in their Linares, Jaén factory as of March 1985 and was sold as a domestic vehicle in Europe due to its over 60% native parts content, thereby evading limits on imports of Japanese-built automobiles. It was only built on the short wheelbase, as a two-door convertible and commercial, or with the three door SUV or van bodywork. Santana built SJs had softer springs for an improved on-road ride, colour coordinated interiors with cloth seats and carpeted floors, all to broaden appeal to those who did not intend to primarily off-road the vehicle.

The Santana-built SJs were also marketed under Santana's own brand or Suzuki Santana in certain countries in Europe. It was also exported to Taiwan as the Santana 1000 due to the ban on fully built Japanese vehicles and the growing trade deficit between Taiwan and Japan.

In March 1990, Santana-built versions received the same chassis developments (including the LWB convertible/hard top and pickup truck models) which turned the SJs into the Samurai; this version was sold as Samurai 1000 or 1300 where it was offered. The Santana-built Samurais did not benefit from the updated coil sprung chassis introduced around 1995, instead receiving a facelift (based on the Coily facelift but with a different grille) specific to European and neighboring markets in 1998. Also around 1998, Santana developed a version which used PSA's XUD9 1.9-litre (1,905 cc) turbodiesel engine, producing 63 PS (46 kW; 62 hp). Top speed is 130 km/h (81 mph). Santana then replaced this diesel Samurai edition with another diesel edition sometime in year 2001, based on Renault's F8Q 1.9-litre (1,870 cc) naturally aspirated diesel engine, producing 64 PS (47 kW; 63 hp). The 1.3-litre petrol engine was also modernized with the sixteen-valve multi-point injection G13BB unit. Spanish Samurai production (both for petrol and for diesel editions) ended in late 2003 or early 2004.

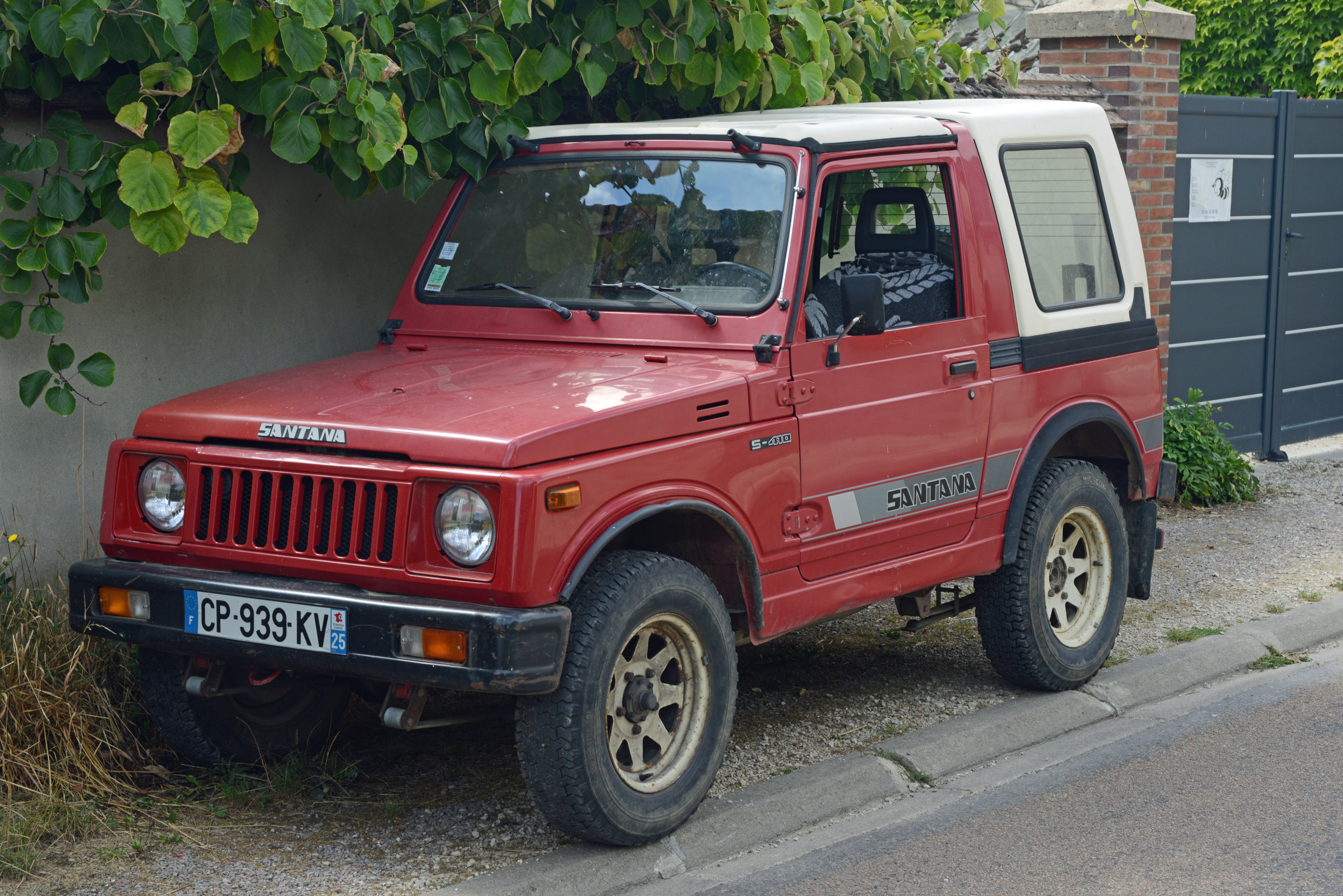
Santana S-410

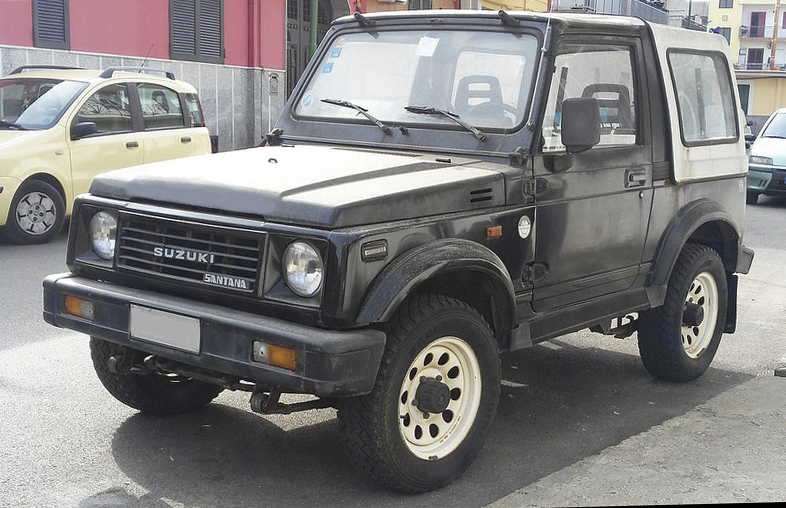
Suzuki Santana Samurai

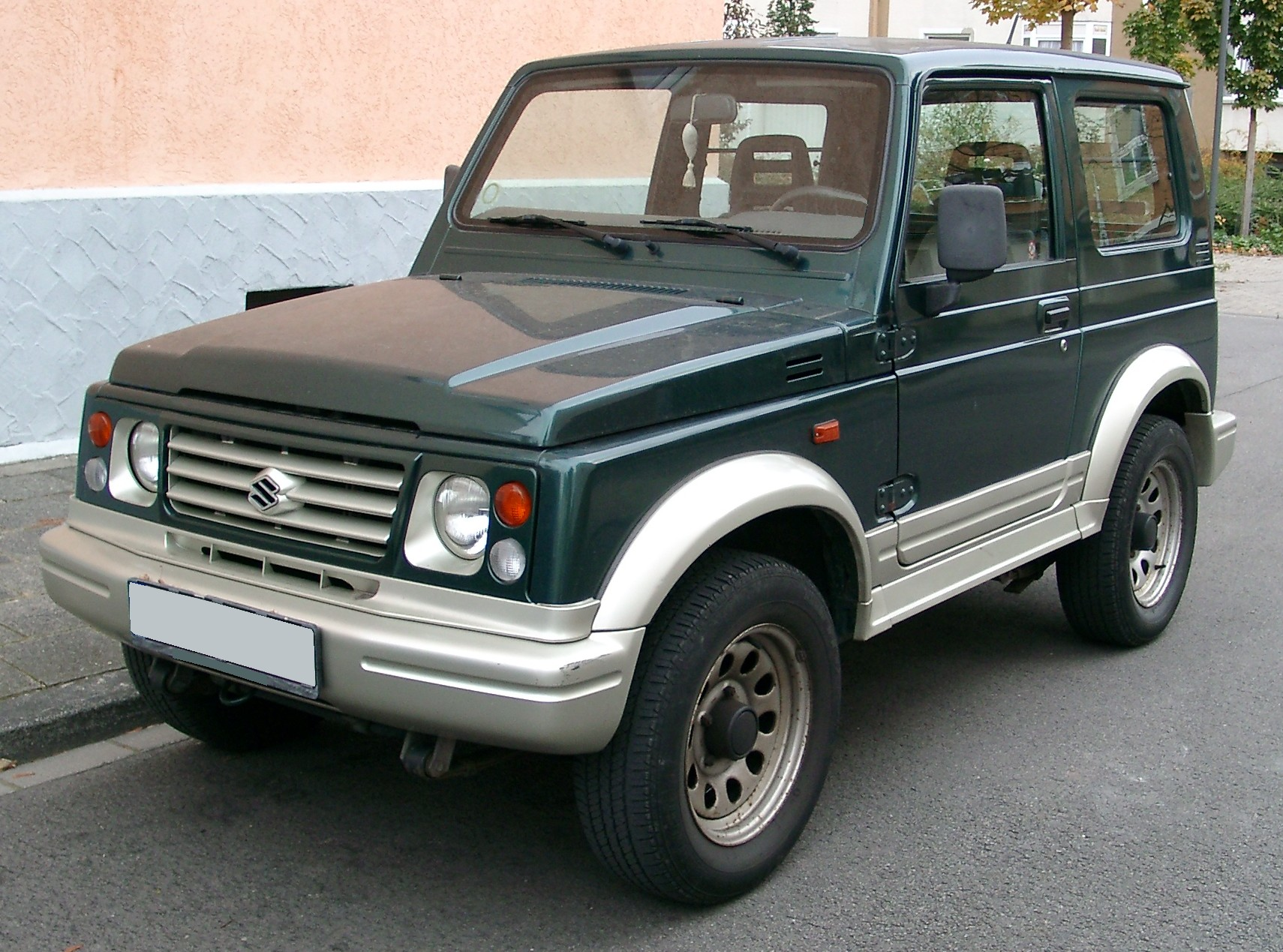
Post-1998 Santana-built Suzuki Samurai

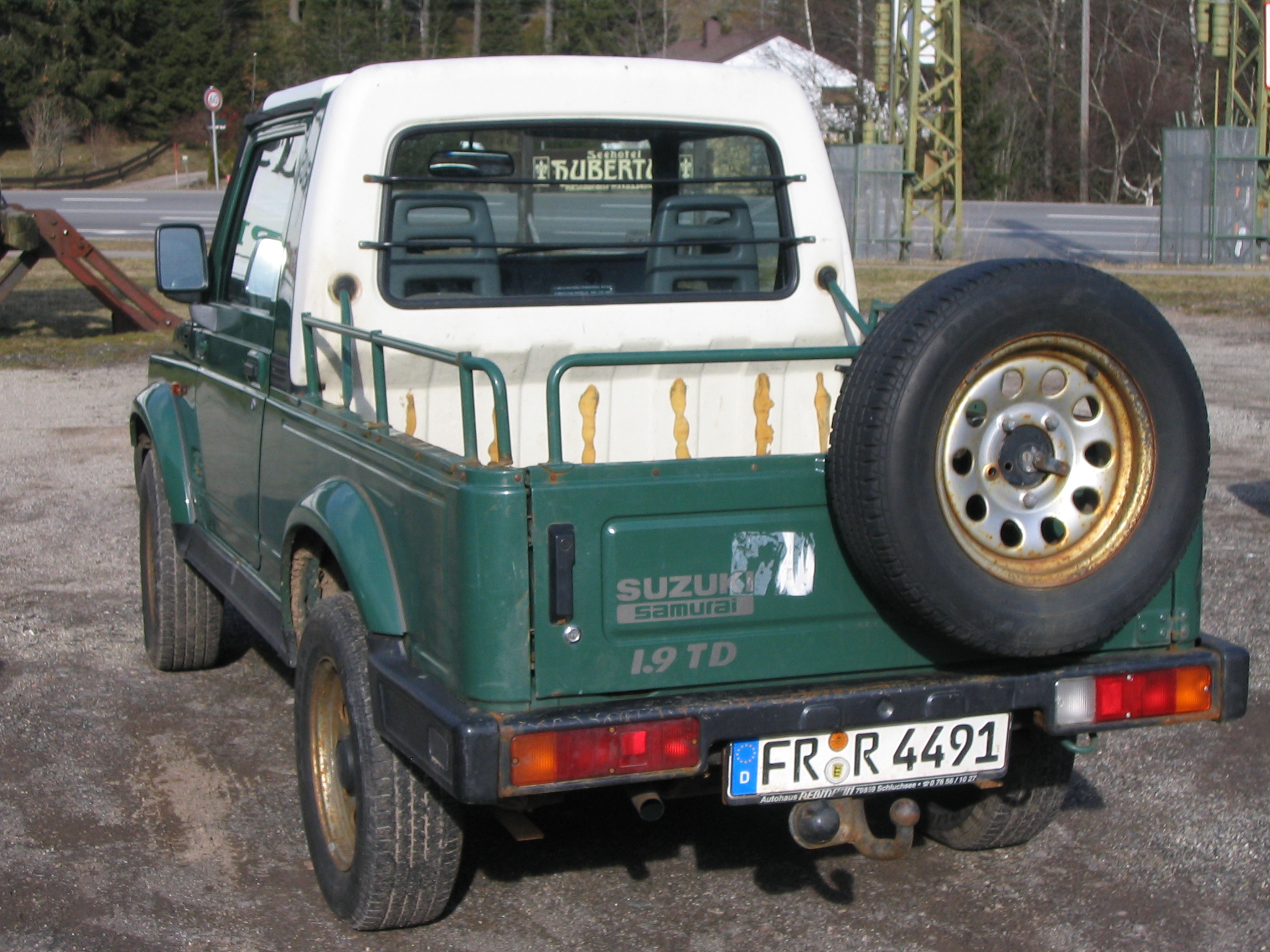
Santana-built Suzuki Samurai pickup truck powered by a 1.9-litre diesel engine

In addition to the Sierra nameplate in Australia, the pickup truck variant was called the Stockman, with the Sierra also being rebadged by Holden as the Holden Drover from 1985 to 1987. Cooper Motor Corporation (CMC) of Nairobi, Kenya, had been building the first generation Jimny and continued with assembly of the SJ410 in the mid-eighties. In Thailand, the SJ413 was branded as the Suzuki Caribian. Initially, it was only available as a three-door LWB truck featuring a fiberglass canopy with oversized windows (popularly nicknamed the "fish tank"). In 1992, it was redesigned as an extended cab pickup and marketed as the Caribian Sporty. From 1984 to 2006, Pak Suzuki locally produced the SWB SJ410/Samurai in Karachi, Pakistan as the Potohar.

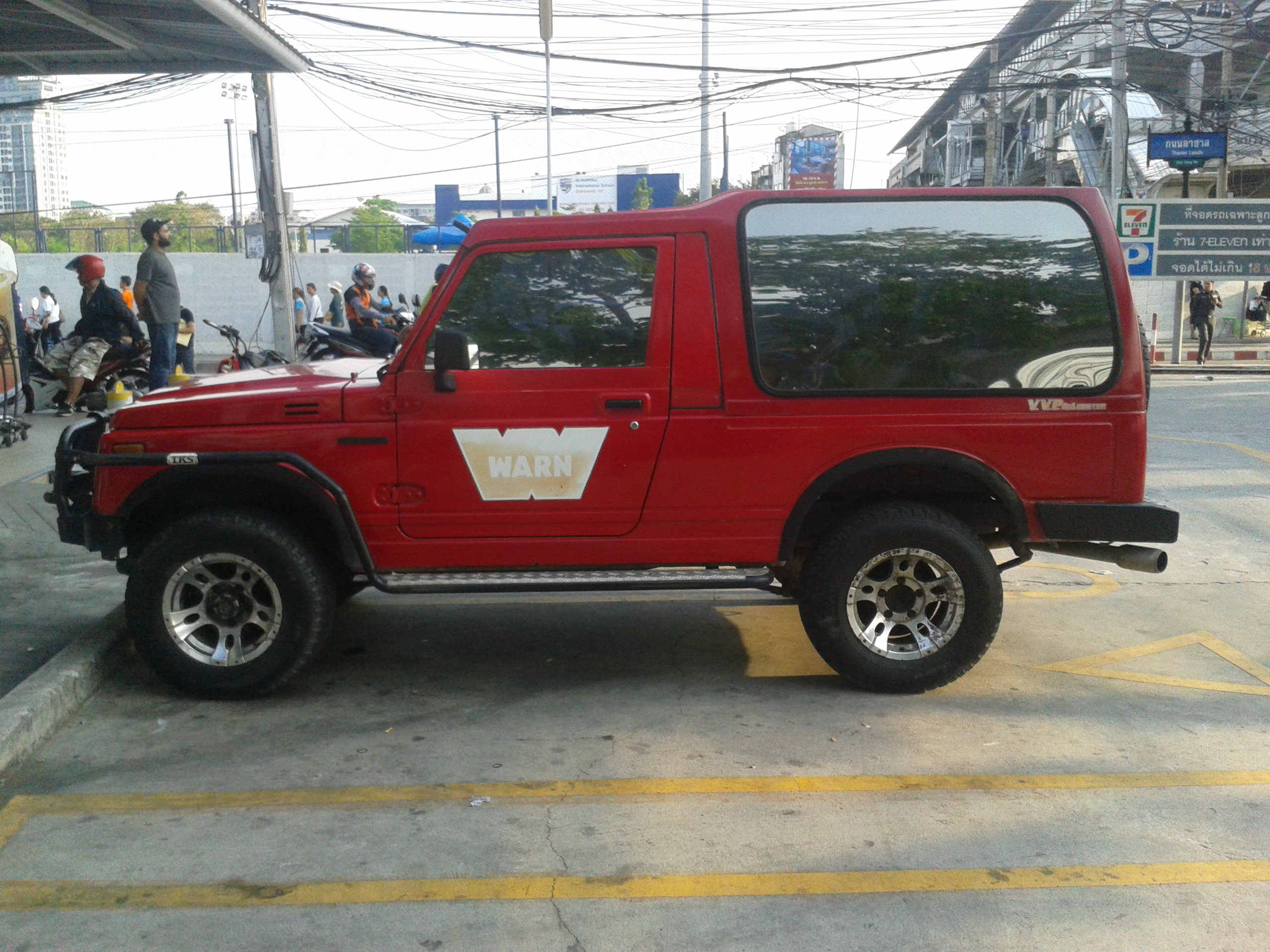
1988–1996 Thai-built Suzuki Caribian "fish tank"

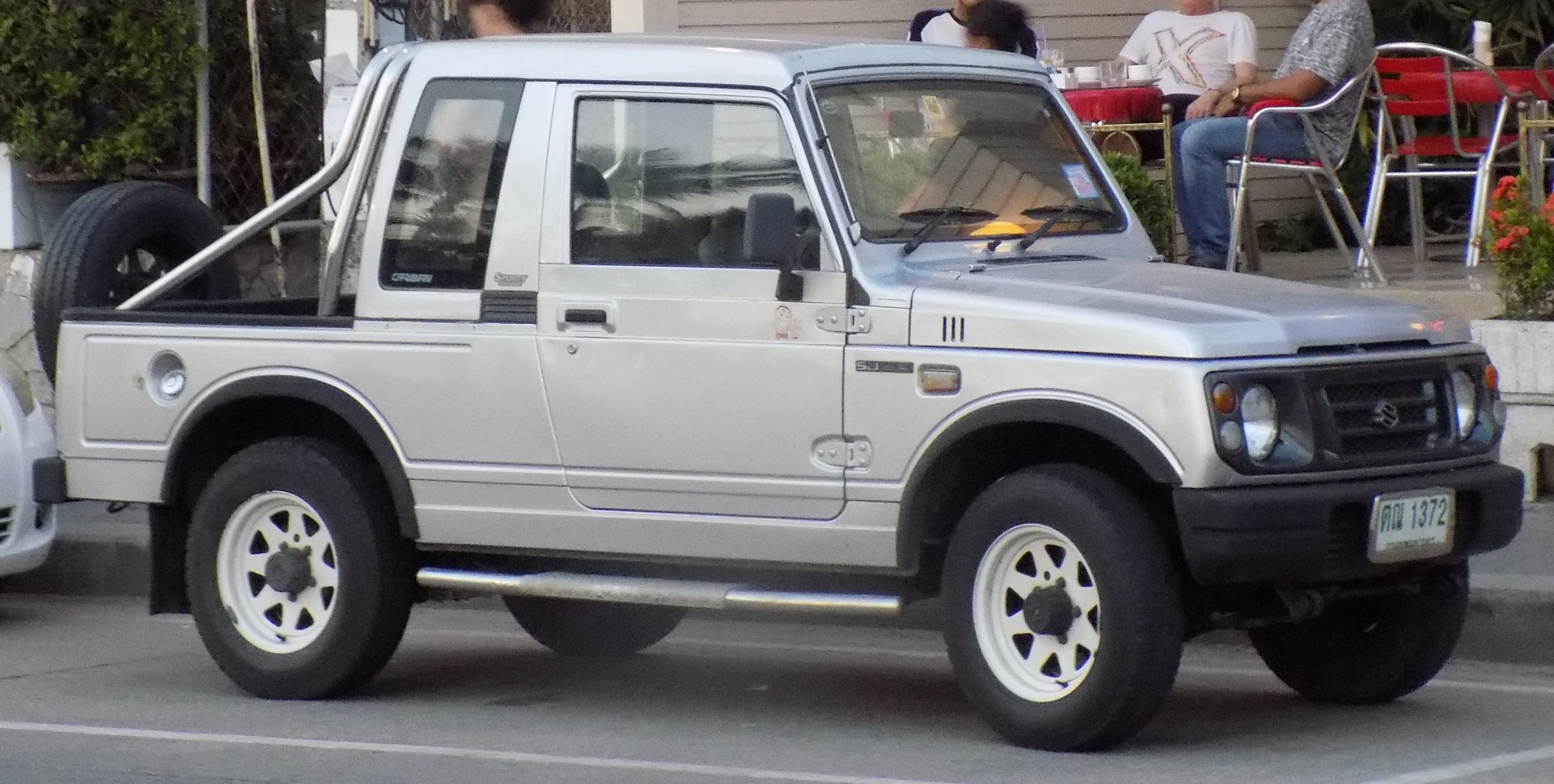
2000–2005 Thai-built Suzuki Caribian Sporty extended-cab pickup

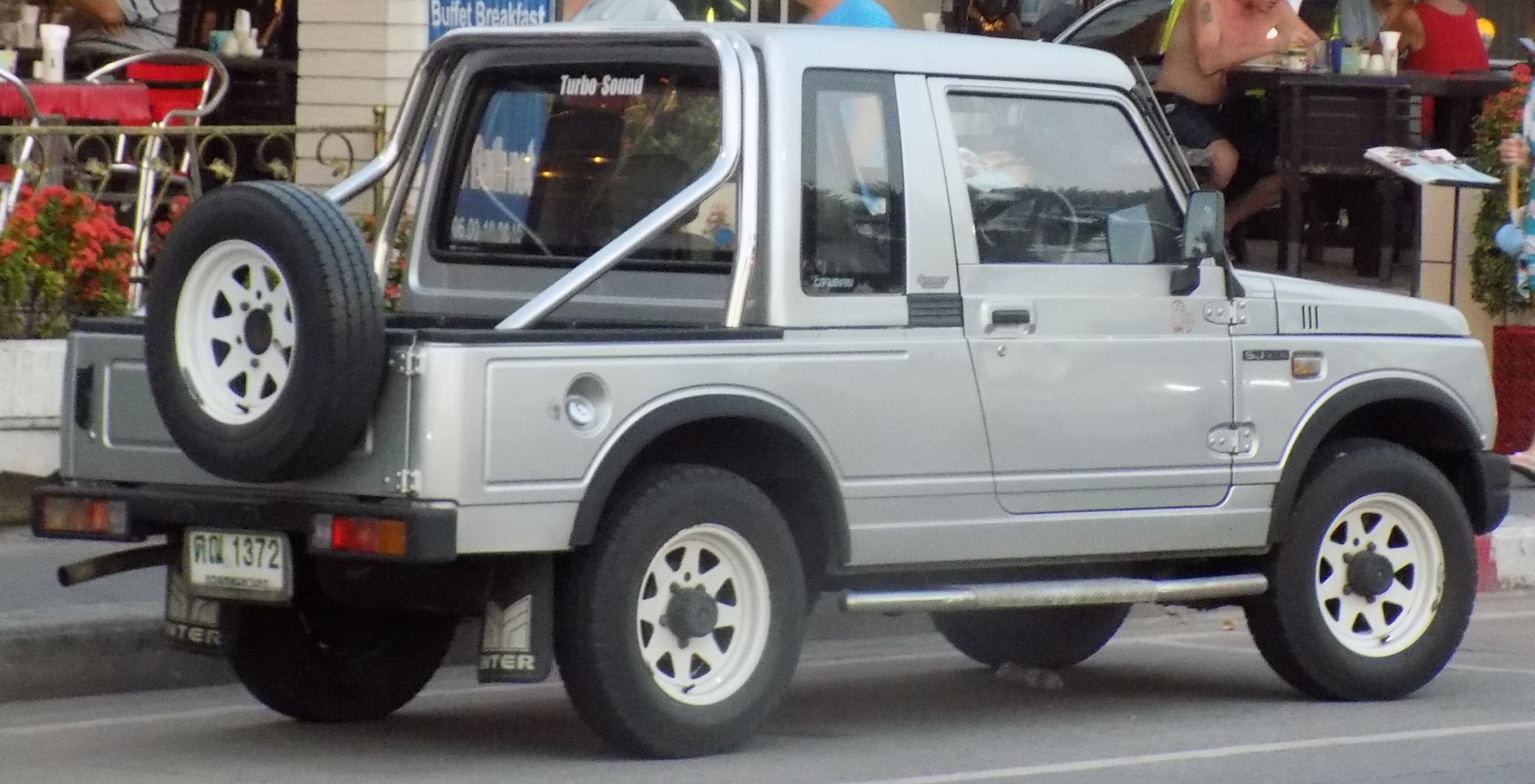
Rear view of Thai-built Suzuki Caribian Sporty extended-cab pickup

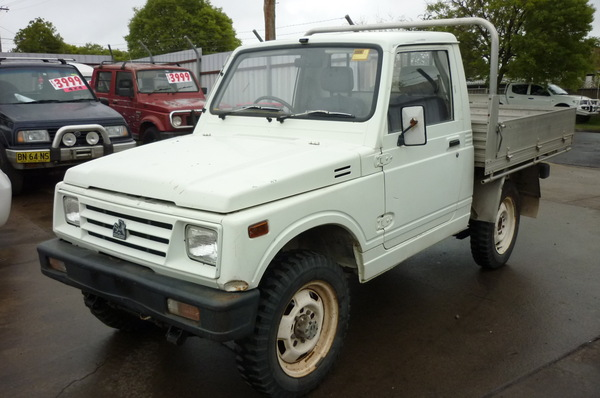
Australian market Holden Drover cab chassis

The Samurai was sold in Colombia as Chevrolet Samurai, assembled in Bogotá by General Motors Colmotores. In other South American markets it was sold as the Suzuki SJ/Samurai. Long wheelbase models were not offered in the Mercosur. For the Chilean market, where there was a temporary tariff threshold at 850 cc, there was also a model called the SJ408, powered by the older 0.8-litre F8A engine.

==== North American market ====
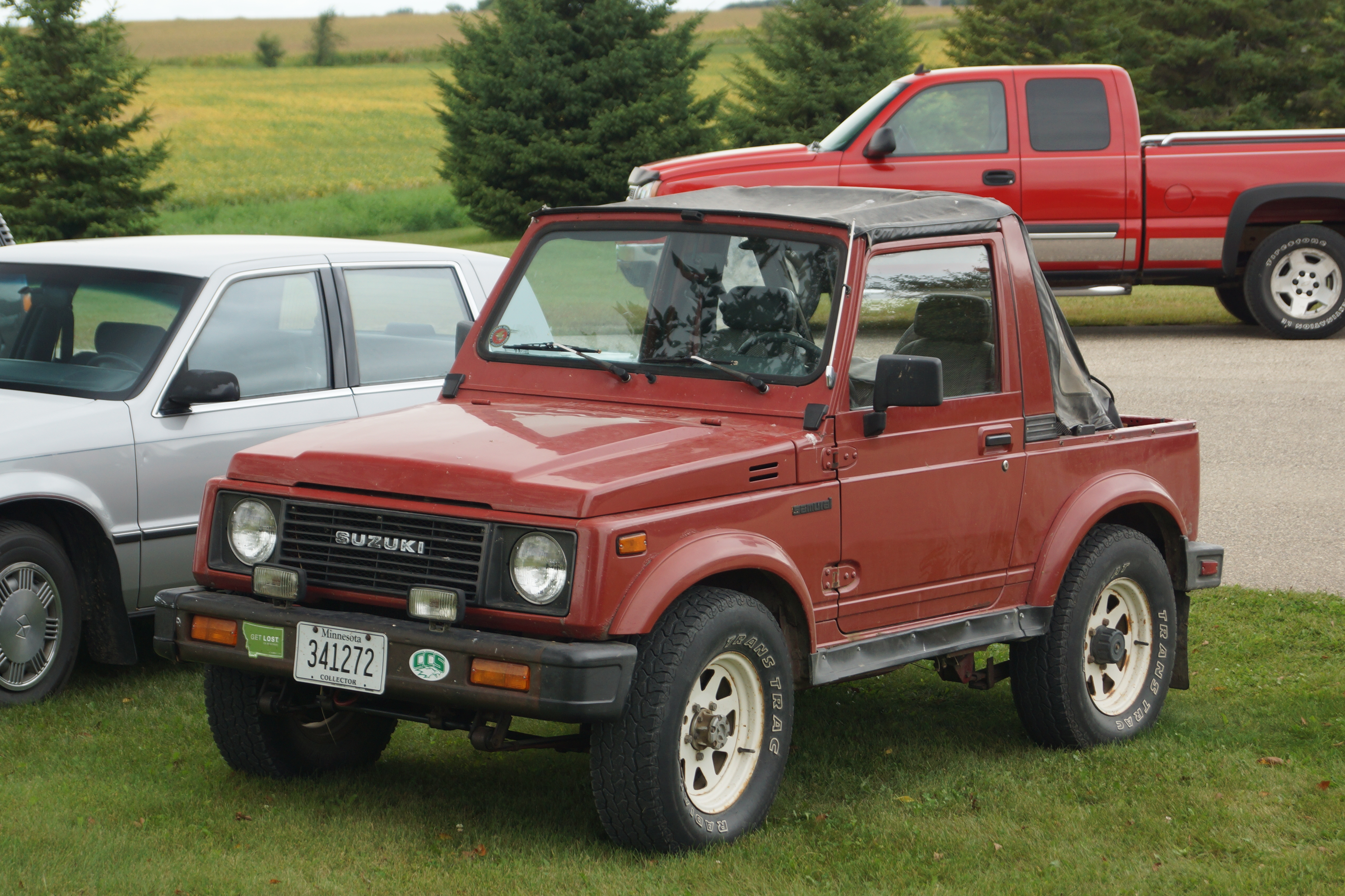
1986–1989 model years North American market Suzuki Samurai

The SJ413 was introduced to the United States in 1985 for the 1986 model year as the Samurai and it was already updated with the wider track. It had gone on sale earlier in Canada and Puerto Rico as the SJ410. The Samurai was only offered as a SWB in the United States, while LWB pickup truck and convertible were initially available in Canada.

It was priced at $6,200 when introduced in the United States and 47,000 were sold in its first year. It had a 1.3-litre, 63 hp (47 kW; 64 PS), four-cylinder engine and was available as a convertible or a hard top, and came equipped with rear seats until 1994. The Suzuki Samurai became intensely popular within the serious 4WD community for its good off-road performance and reliability compared to other 4WDs of the time, outselling the Jeep Wrangler (YJ) by two to one in 1987. This is due to the fact that while very compact and light, it is a real 4WD vehicle equipped with a transfer case, switchable 4WD and low range. Its lightness makes it a very nimble off-roader less prone to sinking in softer ground than heavier vehicles. The 1988.5 model Samurai was re-tuned for better on-road use in the United States. This revision included softer suspension settings and a larger anti-roll bar to reduce body roll. A lower fifth gear (.865:1 vs the earlier .795:1) increased engine speed and power on the highway, and improved dashboard and seats made the Samurai more comfortable. The Samurai was supplemented in Canada and the United States markets in 1989 by the Sidekick, which eventually replaced the Samurai in 1995.

A new 1.3 litre four-cylinder engine with throttle-body fuel injection was introduced with 66 hp (49 kW; 67 PS) in September 1991. A cheaper 2WD version was added to the line up between 1991 and 1993. The rear seat was removed from 1994 and 1995 Samurai models with rear shoulder safety belts becoming mandatory, and the partial roll cage not having the required mounting provisions, unlike the larger Jeep Wrangler. Low sales and pending stricter safety legislation prompted the withdrawal of the Samurai from Canada and the United States markets after 1995.

===== Consumers Union lawsuit =====
An unfavorable 1988 review in Consumer Reports magazine said the Samurai was unsafe and prone to rollovers. In 1996, after investigating the claims, Suzuki of North America sued the magazine's publisher, Consumers Union (CU), for libel. The suit resulted in an inconclusive settlement. CU agreed that it "never intended to imply that the Samurai easily rolls over in routine driving conditions." CU and Suzuki made a joint statement, saying, "CU and Suzuki disagree with respect to the validity" of CU's tests and that "Suzuki disputes the validity" of the tests, while "CU stands by its test protocol and findings."

==== Indonesian production ====
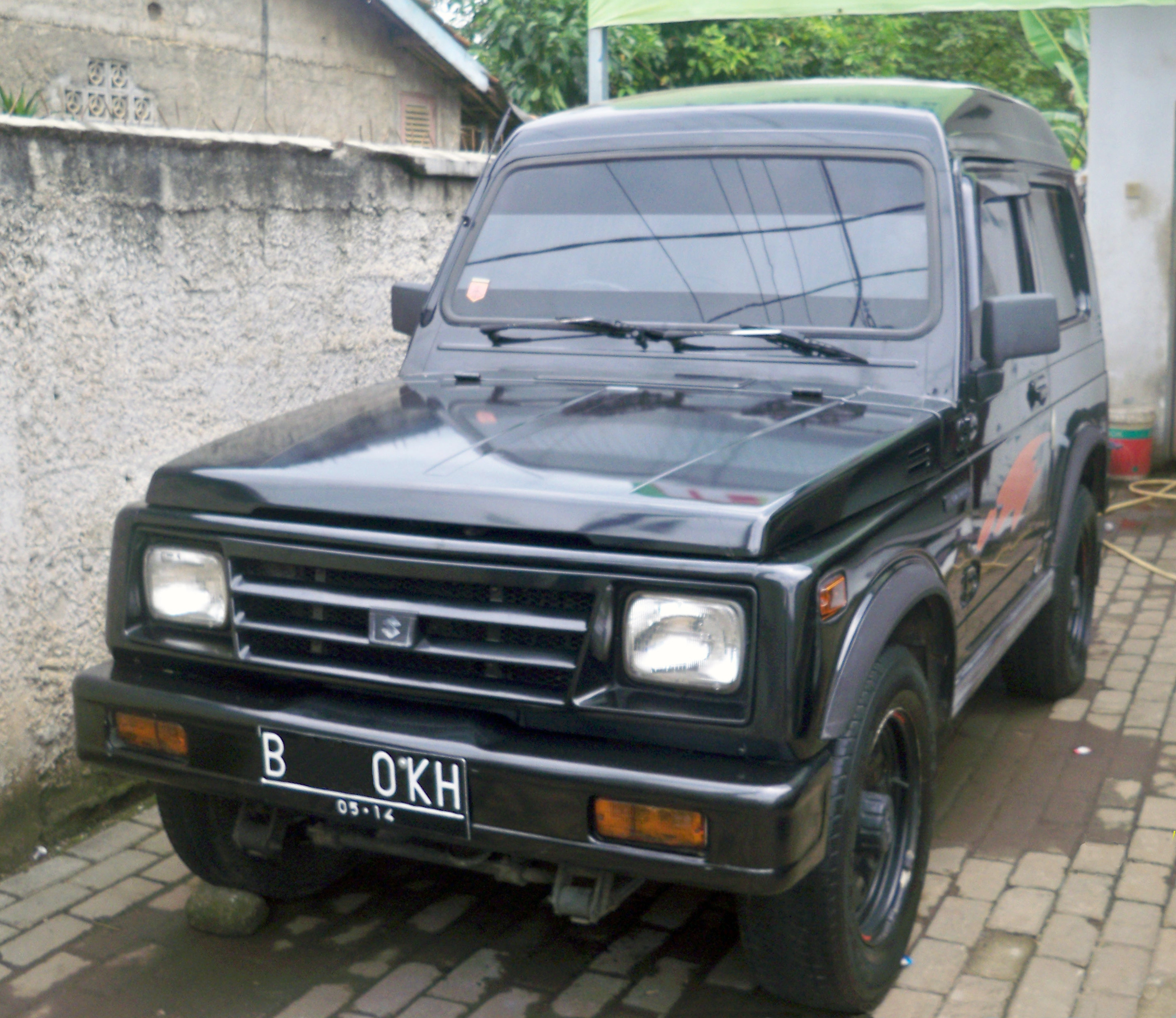
1989–1992 Indonesian-built Suzuki Katana

The SJ410 was also assembled in Indonesia by Suzuki Indomobil Motor since late 1982 until 2006, where it was marketed with different names. The original version was marketed as Super Jimny, continuing from the previous LJ Jimny. The canvas soft top model was marketed in fairly small numbers from 1983 until late 1985 as Jimny Sierra. The earlier model built until 1984 were low-roof, metal-bodied SUVs. A higher-roofed model (Super Jimny 6 or V3) arrived in 1984 and continued to be built until about 1988. In the mid-1980s, responding to the introduction of higher taxes for vehicles with four-wheel-drive, Suzuki introduced a 2WD version as the Katana in September 1986. The name "Katana" is derived from katana, a type of Japanese sword used by samurai warriors. This nameplate was already used by Suzuki for their motorcycle since 1981.

In September 1989, it received updated new square headlights and a new grille similar to the Australian market Holden Drover, and even higher roof than the previous high-roof model. The earlier Katana is only available with "Blitz" variant until a light facelift in late 1992 (round headlights and Samurai's grille) and mid-1993 (new grille design with round headlights and "S" logo). In the same year, the Blitz variant was replaced with the long-running Suzuki Katana GX. The Suzuki Katana GX was produced from 1993 to 2006, with updates only on body sticker design in 1995, 1997, 1999, 2000, 2002, and 2005. There was also a DX variant of Katana below the GX marketed from 1993 to 2000, after which the GX was the sole variant remaining. Both the GX and DX variants were equipped with power steering as standard. As of March 1995, both the Katana GX and DX received a new redesigned steering wheel with the Suzuki "S" logo. In 2005, Suzuki introduced the SJ413 Caribian Spacecab pickup, which was imported from Thailand and sold until 2007. Sales of the second generation Jimny in Indonesia ended in July 2006.

In Indonesia, various coachbuilders also offered stretched and rebodied variants, including five-door station wagons. Marvia, a coachbuilder which was part of the Indomobil Group — Suzuki's sole Indonesian distributor since 1976 — produced several specialty vehicles based on the rear-wheel-drive Suzuki Katana. Notable examples of these Katana-based builds include the Marvia Classic (an SS Jaguar 100 kit car) and a replica of the iconic AC Cobra.

==== Maruti Gypsy ====
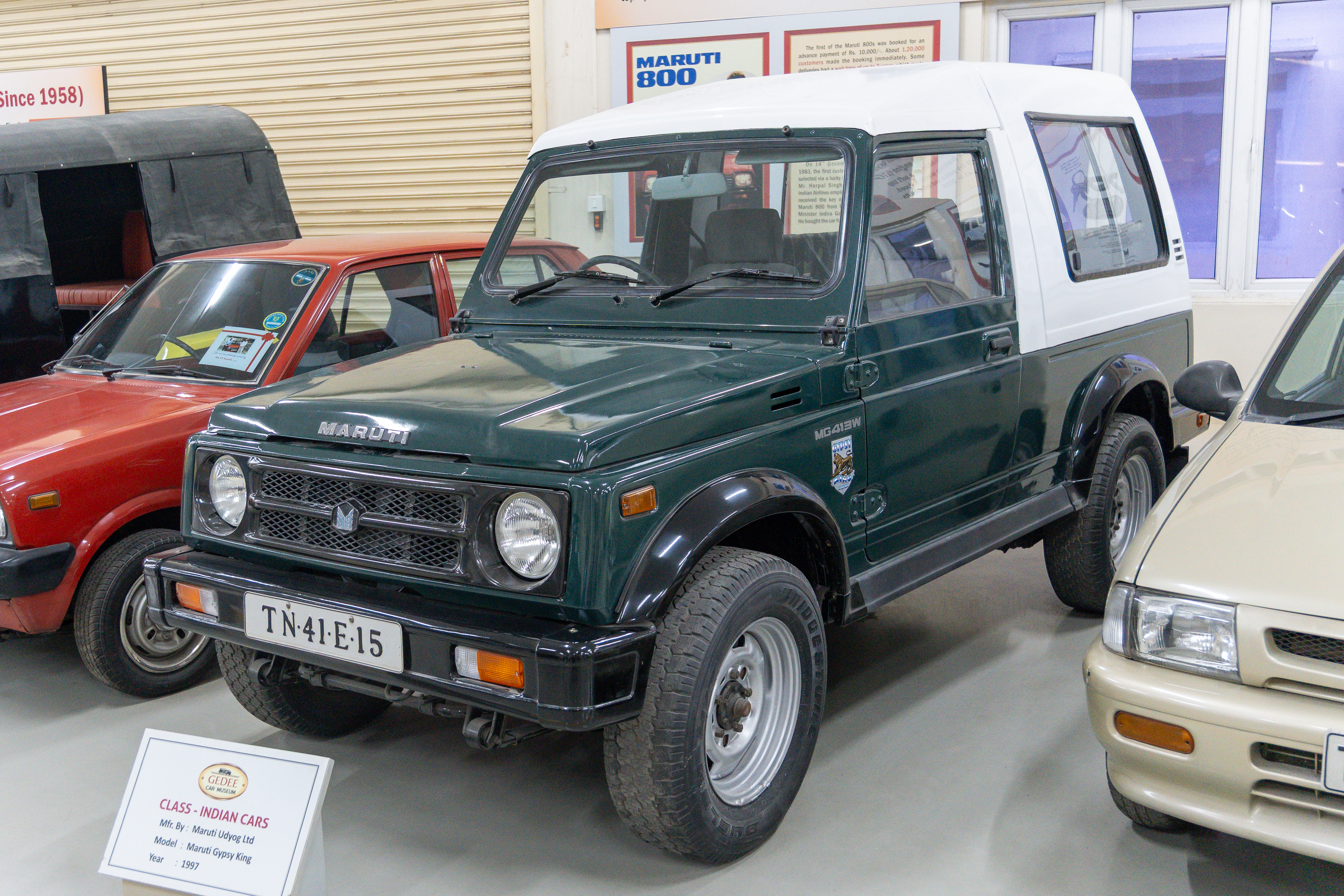
Maruti Gypsy King

The Indian built SJ410/413 (rebranded as MG410/413) has only ever been available in a long-wheelbase version. The Gypsy remained in production for the Indian subcontinent market until late 2018. The last version produced in India by Maruti was the Samurai-based Gypsy King, using the sixteen-valve, 1.3-litre G13BB engine with 80 PS (59 kW; 79 hp). The Gypsy King is still popular with the Indian armed forces and police units. The Gypsy was also exported to limited areas in Southeastern Europe, South America, Eastern Africa and Russia. From the early 1990s until 1999, Suzuki Australia transitioned its sourcing of the Sierra Stockman ute from Japan to India. These Inidan-sourced utes can be identified by the MG410 badge on the front wings and VIN beginning with the prefix MA.

In 2013, Suzuki New Zealand reintroduced the Suzuki SJ series into New Zealand badged as the Suzuki Farm Worker 4x4, although the Maruti badge can clearly be seen in the centre of the radiator grille. The vehicle is actually the leaf-sprung Maruti Gypsy King MG413W, powered by the G13BB 1.3-litre, sixteen-valve engine, producing 59 kW (80 PS; 79 hp) at 6,000 rpm and 103 N⋅m (76 lb⋅ft) of torque at 4,500 rpm, mated to a five-speed, all synchromesh gearbox and a high/low 2WD/4WD transfer box. The Farm Worker is available in four slightly differing styles, two having a rear window and fibreglass bulkhead, and two having canvas roofs with foldable front windscreens, all based on the long wheelbase version (the only version built by Maruti) and offering a maximum payload of 500 kg. As its name suggests the Farm Worker is intended for farm work only and is not able to be road registered due to the vehicle not meeting current crash protection regulations, although it does come with seat belts for the front two seats.

=== High altitude world record ===
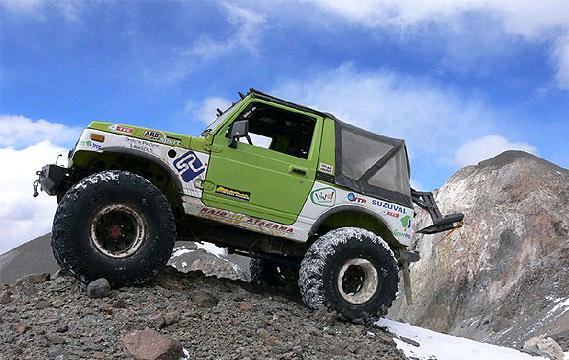
The modified vehicle used in the expedition.

On 21 April 2007, the Chilean duo of Gonzalo Bravo and Eduardo Canales drove their modified Suzuki Samurai (SJ413) up Ojos del Salado to an altitude of 6,688 m (21,942 ft), setting a new record for the highest altitude attained by a four-wheeled vehicle, surpassing the previous record of 6,646 m (21,804 ft) set by a Jeep.

The Samurai in question benefited from wheel, tire, and suspension changes, and a supercharged G16A four-cylinder engine. It was the third attempt for the two man team, after encountering weather difficulties on the first attempt and an engine fire in the second. The previous record holder's team led by Matthias Jeschke driving a Jeep Wrangler, left a sign reading "Jeep Parking Only: All others don't make it up here anyway". The Chilean team found the sign, blown down by strong winds, and brought it back to civilization as a souvenir.

This record was duly certified by the Guinness World Record in July 2007.

On 13 December 2019, Jeschke reclaimed the record with a Mercedes Benz Unimog.

== Third generation (1998) ==
Third generation
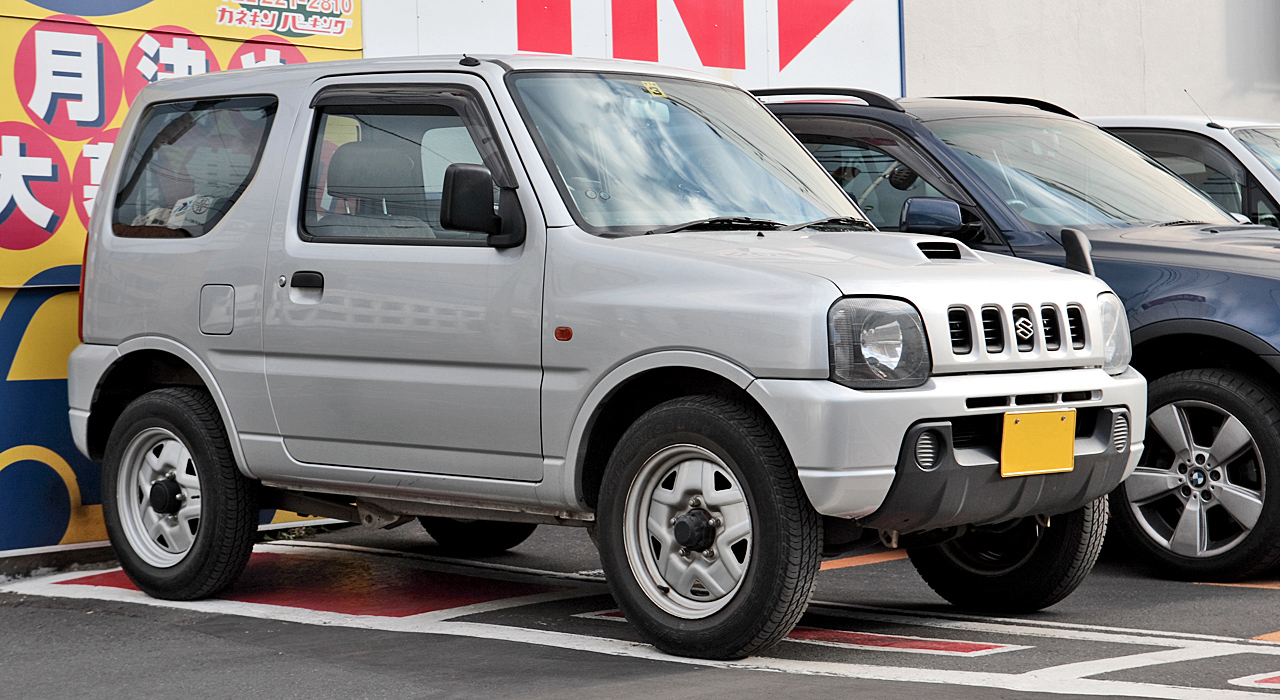
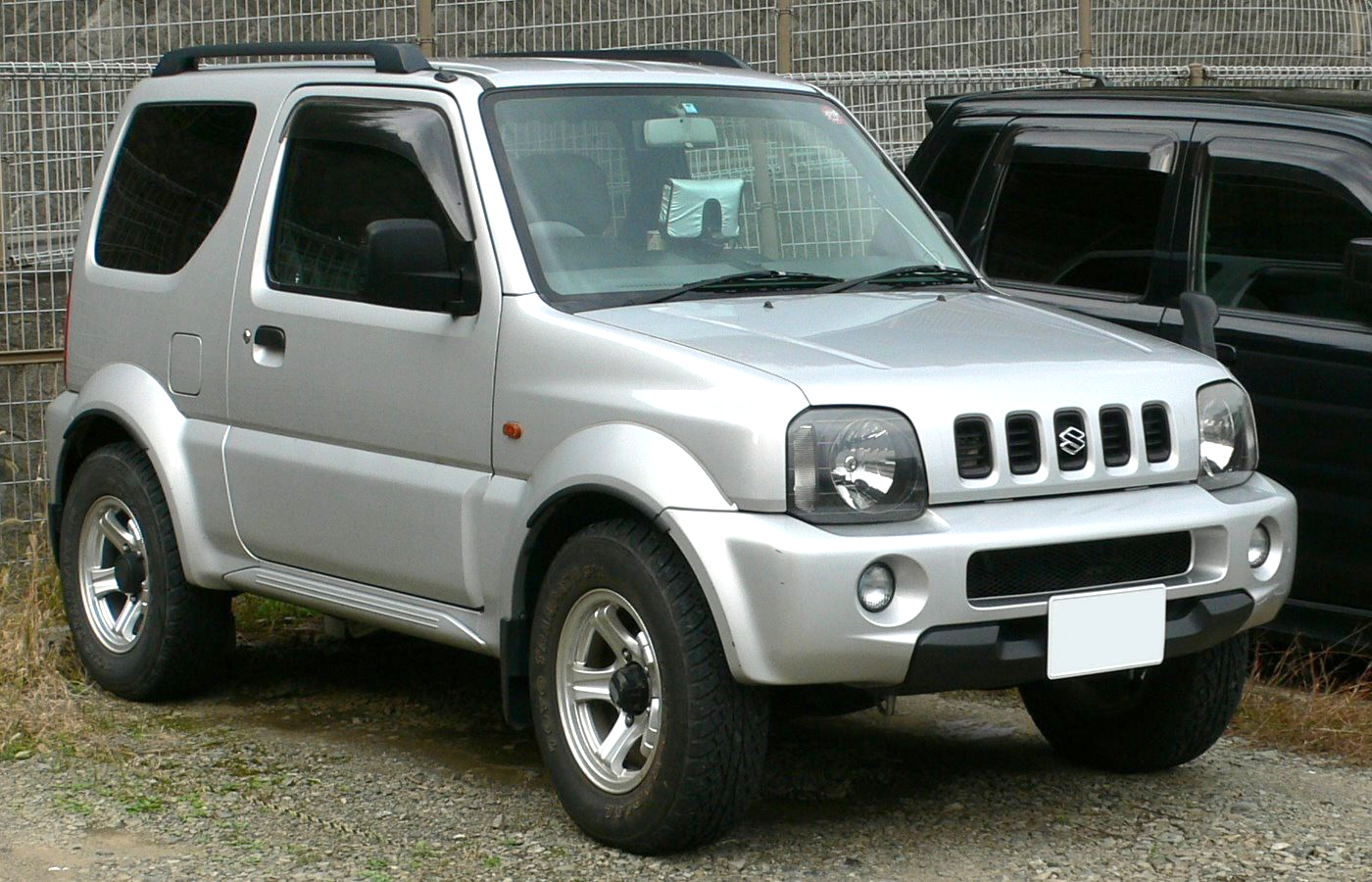
- The top Jimny JB23 is compliant with Japan's kei-car class dimensions, by omitting fender flares and having small bumpers. All other versions feature fender flares and larger bumpers, and are known as "Jimny Wide" or "Jimny Sierra".

Overview
- Model code: JB23/JB33/JB43/JB53; JM23 (AZ-offroad)
- Also called: Suzuki Jimny Wide; Suzuki Jimny Sierra; Chevrolet Jimny; Mazda AZ-Offroad
- Production: 1998–2018 (Japan, Colombia); 1998–2009 (Spain); 1999–2014 (AZ-offroad); 1998–2022 (Brazil)
- Assembly: Iwata, Japan; Bogotá, Colombia (GM Colombia); Linares, Spain (Santana Motor); Anápolis,Brazil (MMC Automotores); Catalão, Brazil (MMC Automotores)

Body and chassis
- Body style: 2-door convertible; 3-door SUV

Powertrain
- Engine: petrol: 658 cc K6A turbo I3 (JB23); 1,298 cc G13BB I4 (JB33); 1,328 cc M13A I4 (JB43); diesel: 1,461 cc K9K turbo I4 (JB53)
- Transmission: 5-speed manual; 4-speed automatic

Dimensions
- Wheelbase: 2,250 mm (88.6 in)
- Length: Kei class: 3,395 mm (133.7 in); Regular: 3,675 mm (144.7 in)
- Width: Kei class: 1,475 mm (58.1 in); Regular: 1,600 mm (63.0 in)
- Height: 1,680–1,705 mm (66.1–67.1 in)
- Curb weight: Kei class: 930–1,000 kg (2,050.3–2,204.6 lb); Regular: 960–1,155 kg (2,116.4–2,546.3 lb)

Chronology
- Successor: Mazda Flair Crossover (indirect)

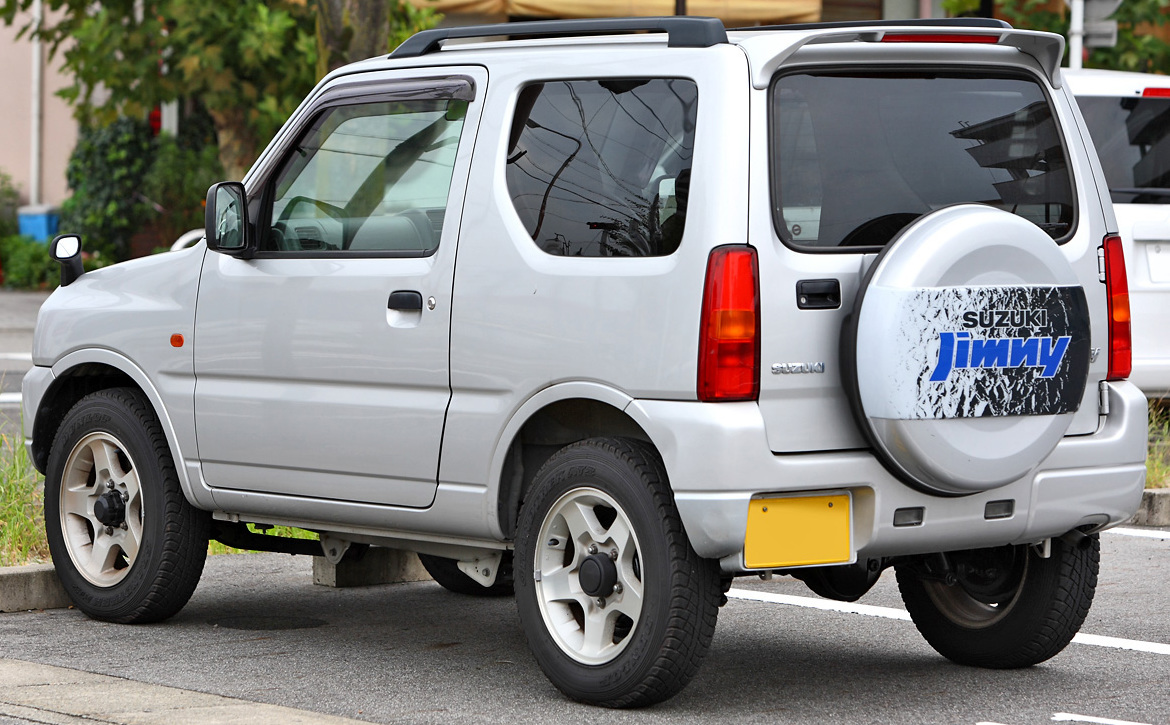
Jimny (JB23; rear view)

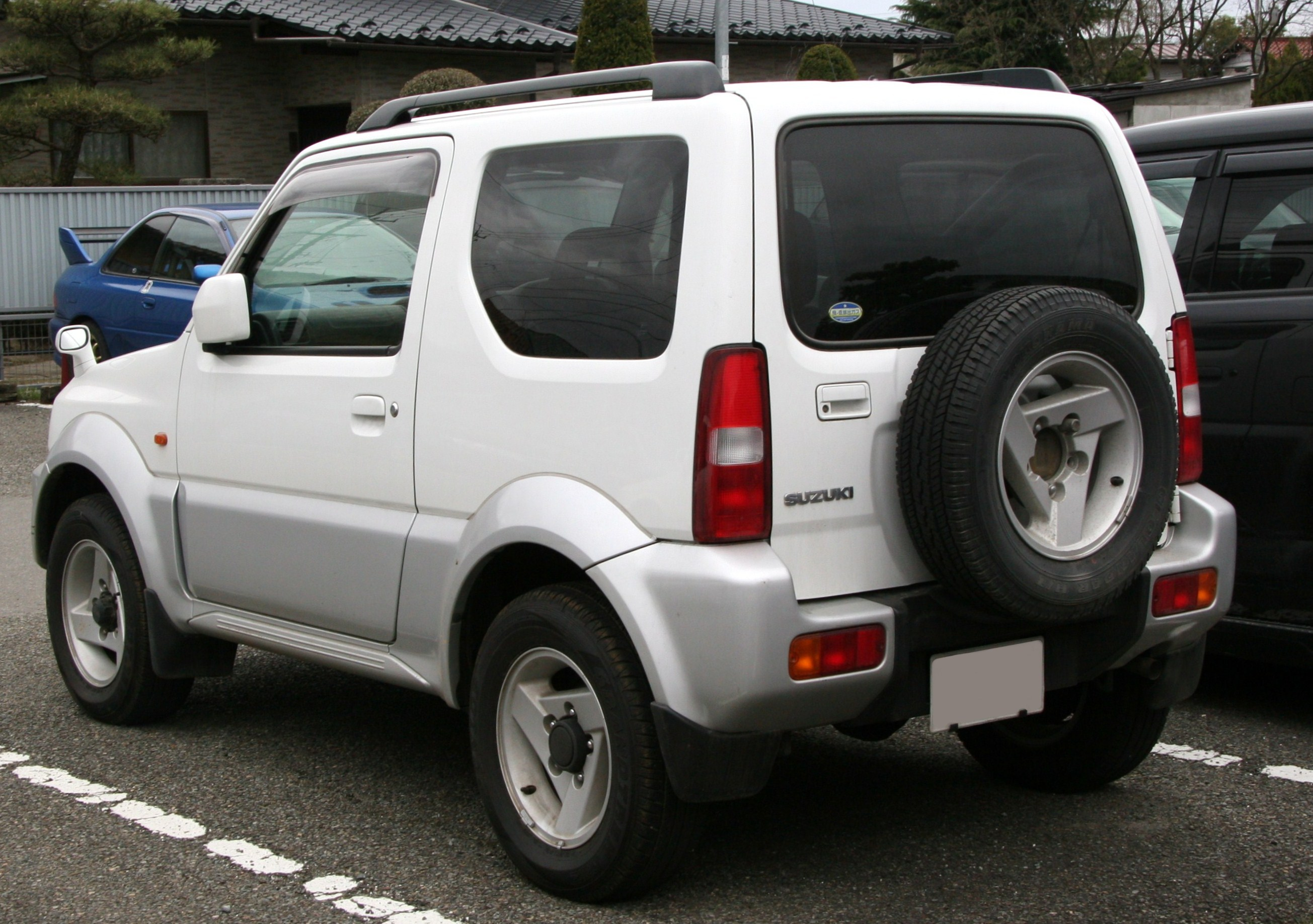
Jimny Sierra (JB43; rear view)

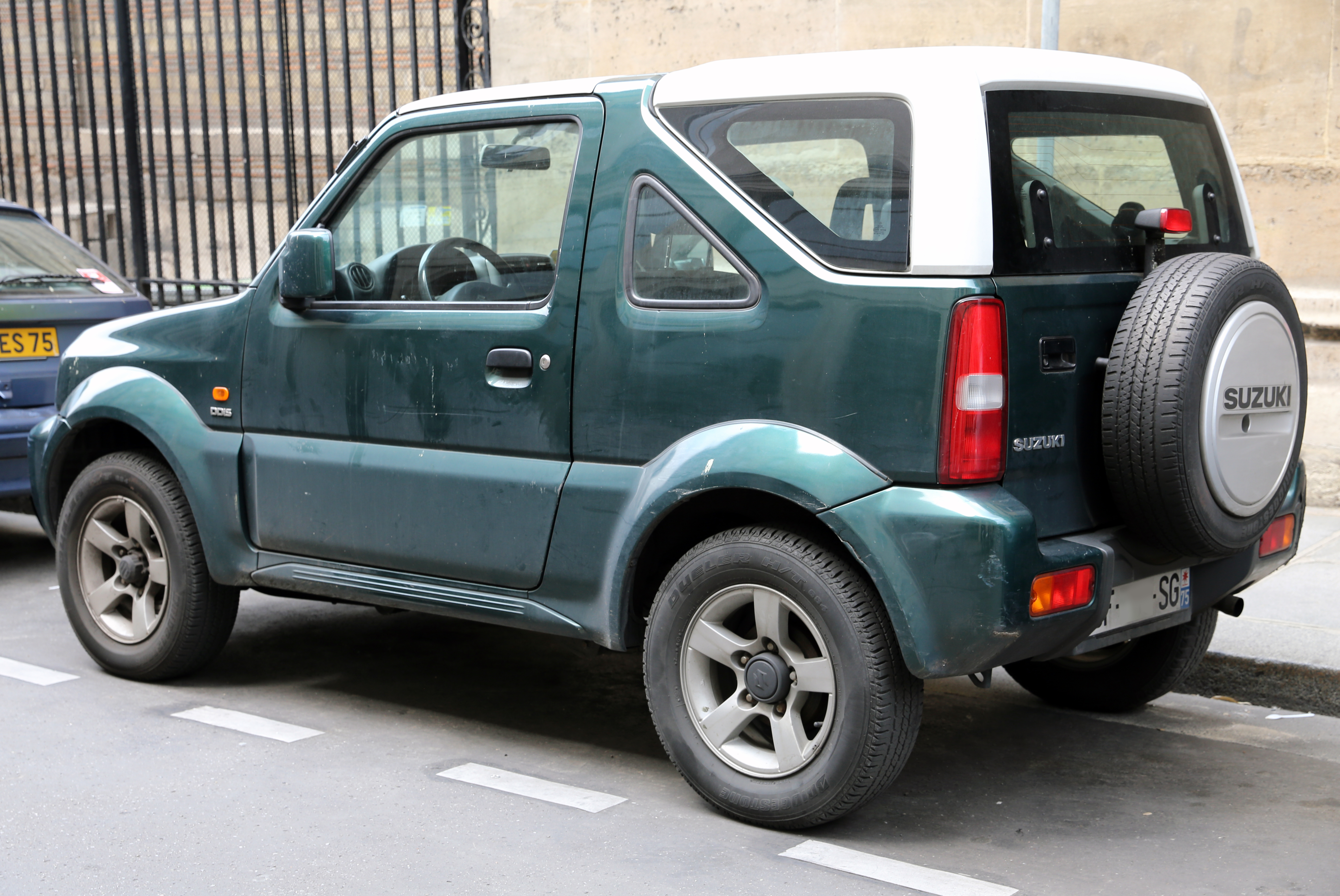
The Jimny Canvas-Top was built in Spain from 1999 to 2009.

At the 1997 Tokyo Motor Show, Suzuki presented the all-new Jimny with a much more modern design. A ladder type chassis and a dual-ratio transfer case were retained, unlike many competing compact 4WDs which lack a low range, and are strictly in the crossover category. Two versions are available in export markets: a standard hard top and the Canvas Top, introduced at the Barcelona Motor Show in May 1999 and was built only by Santana in Spain between 1999 and 2009. The Jimny replaced the popular Sierra/Samurai model in most markets (European introduction was in Paris, 1998), though its predecessor remained in limited production in some places.

For the domestic market, the 1.3-litre Jimny Wide entered the market in January 1998 - unexpectedly, the 660 cc, K6A-engined kei car version which is responsible for most Jimny sales in Japan only arrived in October, long after the larger Jimny Wide. This was because the new Jimny was designed to take advantage of the new kei car regulations and could not go on sale before they took effect.

The larger 1.3-litre Jimny was originally equipped with the G13BB engine also used in the JB32. The 80 PS (59 kW) G13BB engine was replaced in Japan with the January 2000 introduction of the newly designed VVT 16-valve M-engine, but soldiered on in Spanish-built softtops until 2005. For the continental European market, where the diesel cars hold a significant market share, in 2004 the turbo-diesel Jimny JB53 was introduced, built by Santana and using a Renault-built DDiS 1,461 cc K9K engine. Power was originally 65 PS (48 kW) but was increased to 86 PS (63 kW) in 2005, the same as in petrol versions. It was discontinued in 2011, and was never available in Britain and Ireland.

The Jimny has a part-time 4WD system controlled by three dashboard buttons: 2WD, 4WD, and 4WD-L. The default is 2WD, powering the rear wheels. When 4WD is pressed, the front wheels are also engaged in high gear. The 4WD-L engages all wheels in a lower gear ratio. Being a part-time 4WD, there is no centre differential or viscous coupling to allow for speed differences between the front and rear wheels, so only two-wheel drive mode works well on dry pavement. In Japan, the "Sierra" name was revived in January 2002, when 1.3-litre Jimnys began to be sold as the "Jimny Sierra" rather than as the "Jimny Wide".

The Jimny's vacuum-locking hubs allow it to be shifted from 2WD to 4WD while travelling at up to 100 km/h (62 mph). Shifting to low range requires the vehicle to be stopped, but no need to exit the vehicle exists. Newer Jimnys have electronic push-button selectable four-wheel drive, which requires the vehicle to be stopped with the clutch depressed and transmission in neutral to select low range.

The Jimny has large windows, giving excellent visibility, apart from a rather serious blind spot caused by the oversized "B" pillar. The large amount of glass also magnifies the greenhouse effect, and the Jimny comes with air conditioning standard in some regions.

In Europe, both Hard Top and Canvas Top versions come in JX and JLX specifications. These are fairly standard designations across the Suzuki off-road range, with the JLX being the fully optioned "luxury" version. In the case of the Jimny, the JLX adds roof rails, power steering, power windows, power-adjustable exterior mirrors, and several interior comfort improvements. Both models are available with a five-speed manual or four-speed automatic gearbox. The 2WD option is only available as a five-speed manual, offered between 1998 and 2000. The 2WD variant was also offered in Japan for Kei model, specifically marketed toward female customers. It was initially sold as the Jimny L between 2000 and 2001, before being rebranded as the Jimny J2 and refreshed with a more stylish appearance until 2002.

In 2009, Santana Motor of Spain ended its agreement with Suzuki to make the Canvas Top version, which has not been available since then. In 2011, Santana Motor went bankrupt. The Souza Ramos Group of Brazil, which used to make Mitsubishi cars under license, will start manufacturing the Suzuki Jimny in 2012 in Brazil to compensate for the loss of production capacity from Santana Motor. Whether the Canvas Top version will be manufactured also in Brazil is not known.

As in Japan, Jimnys in Australia have borne the name Jimny Sierra since 2007, largely due to the Sierra name having become synonymous with small, capable off-road vehicles. Since 1999, GM Colmotores have been assembling the 1.3-litre, 79 PS (58 kW) JB33 with the name "Chevrolet Jimny" in Bogotá, Colombia. The Jimny is also available as a parallel import in Singapore.

In 2012, for the 2013 model year, the Jimny received a front facelift, giving it a more angular grille and front bumper, and including a hood scoop. For the Indonesian market, the facelifted Jimny was launched at the 25th Gaikindo Indonesia International Auto Show on 10 August 2017, and 88 units were sold exclusively for a limited time only.

Production of third generation Jimny ceased worldwide (except in Brazil) in 2018 after 20 years of production, as Suzuki retooled in preparation of the fourth generation's launch in late 2018.

In 2021, a British company called Yomper 4×4 started to produce a couple of pickups based on the third generation Jimny, with their Bergan model having a shorter wheelbase than the version known as the Yomper 4×4 Commercial. In 2022, Suzuki Brazil stopped production of the third generation Jimny at their Catalão plant, due to new regulations which meant they could not use the car's 1.3-litre M13A engine without updating it. At that time Suzuki Brazil's range consisted of two Jimny models, with the fourth generation model known as the "Jimny Sierra" and the facelifted third generation on sale in four different versions (all with M13A engine) with the Jimny 4Work being the base model and the Jimny Forest being the top-of-the-range model.

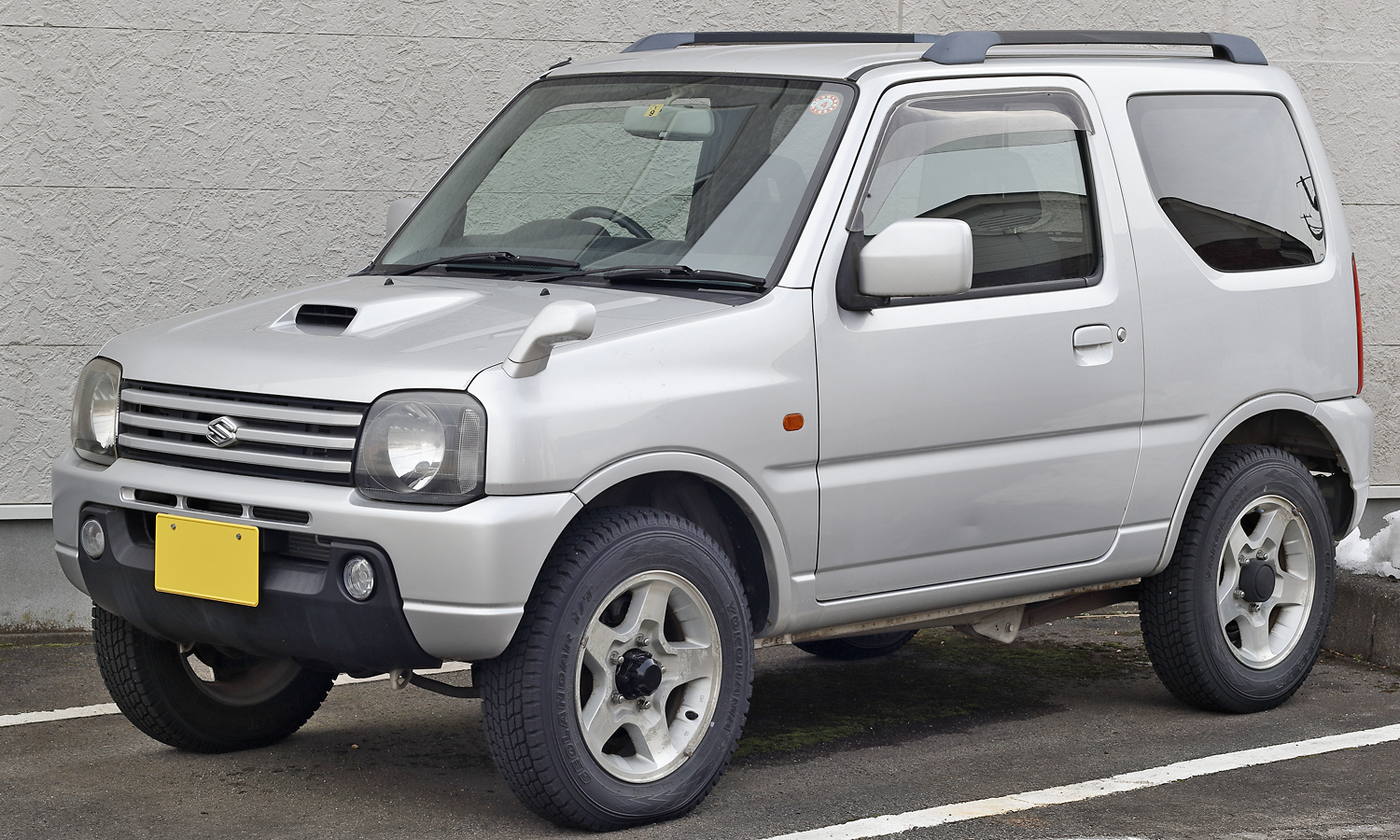
Jimny (JB23; first facelift)

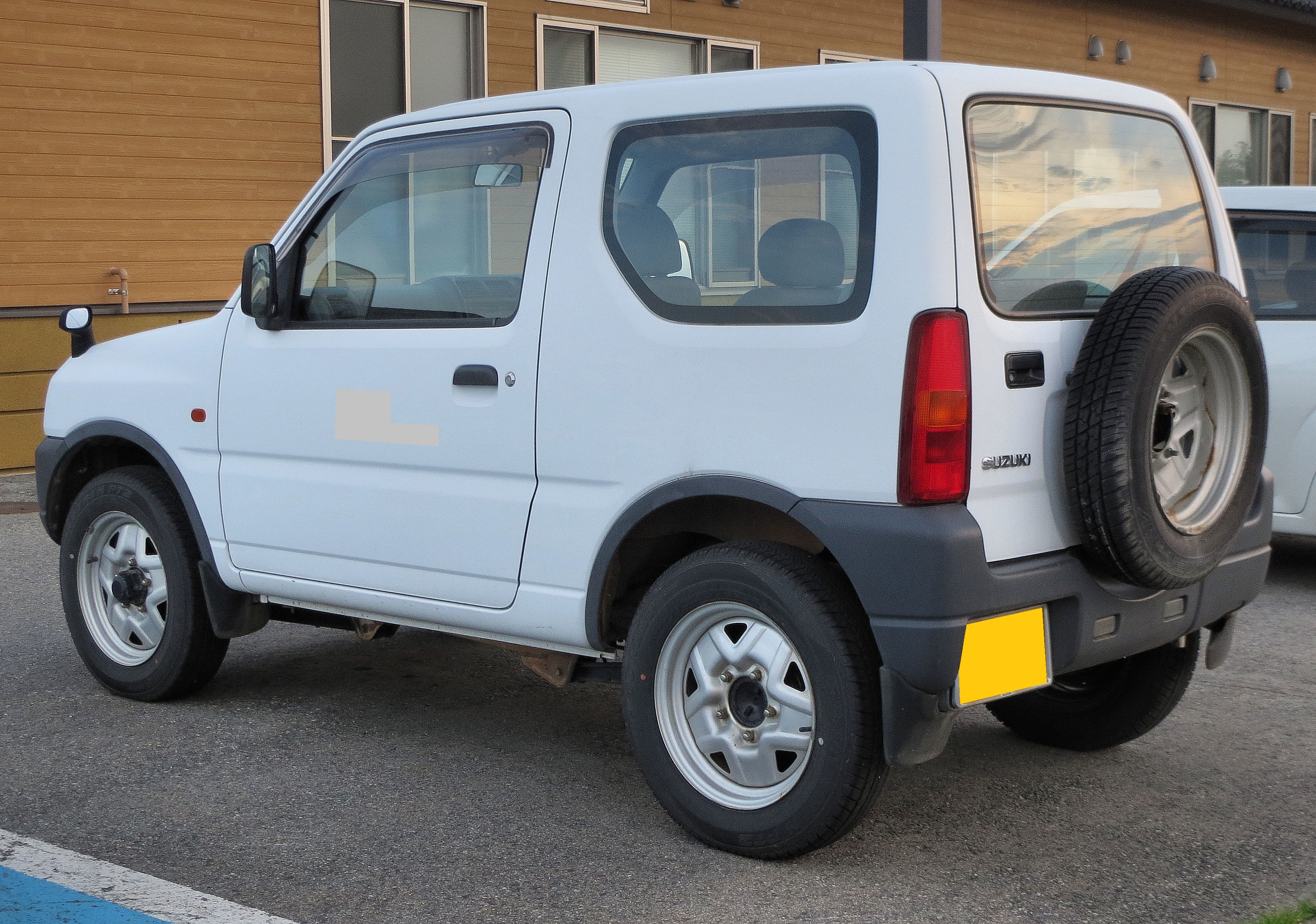
The very basic Jimny XA was built between October 1998 and April 2000 (JB23, pre-facelift)

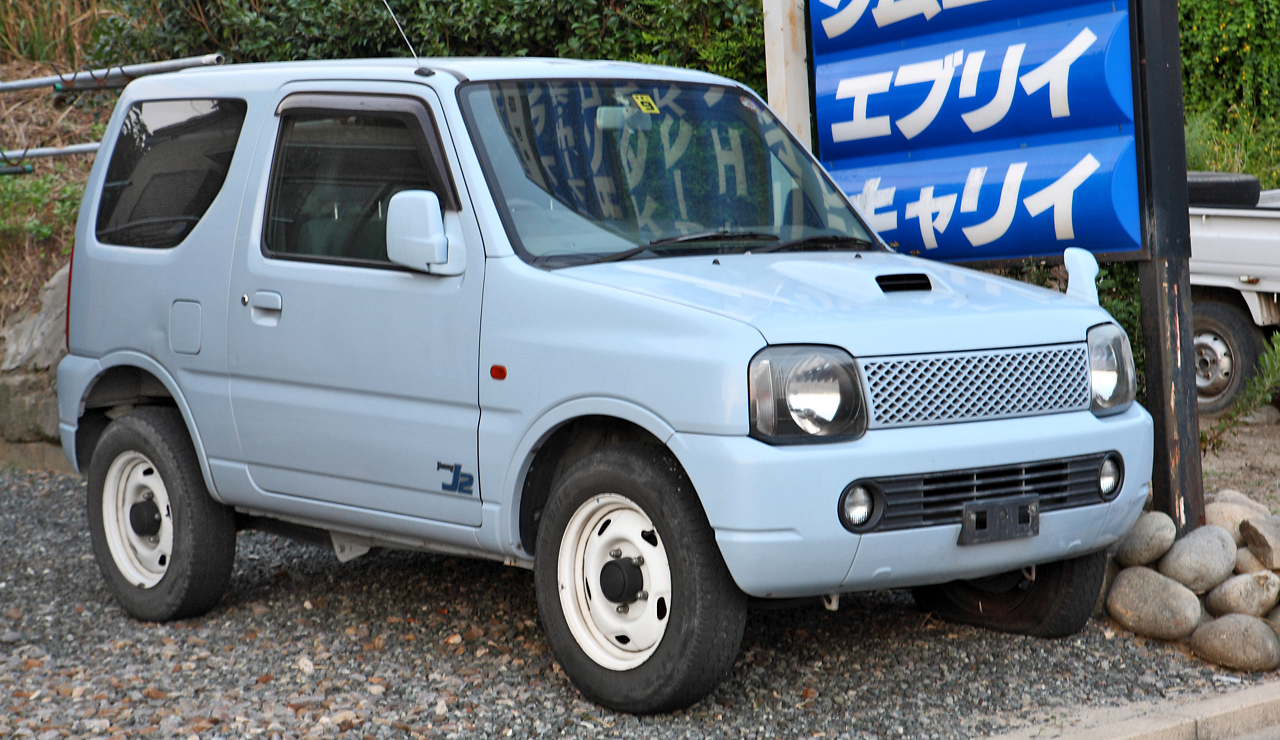
The 2WD Jimny J2 was short-lived, only built between February 2001 and January 2002 (JB23)

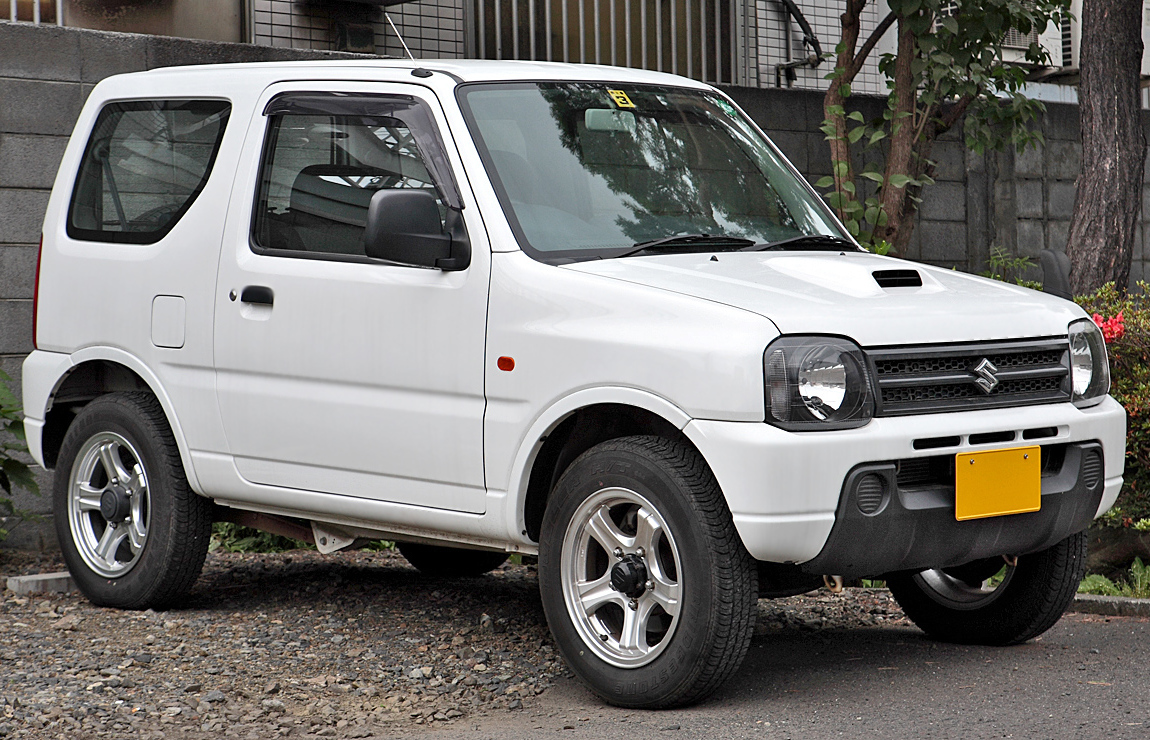
Jimny (JB23; second facelift)

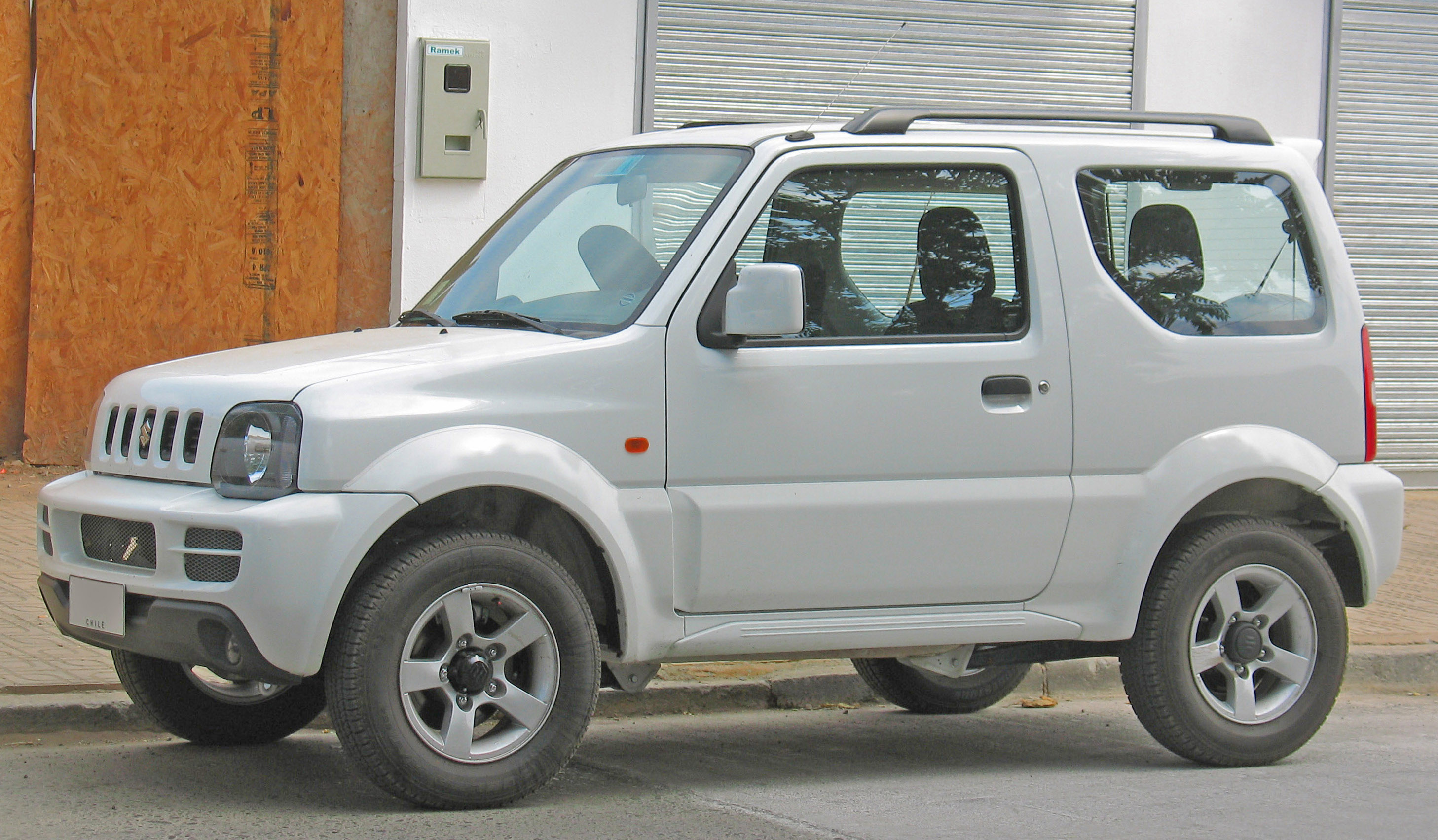
Jimny Sierra (JB43; 2005 facelift)

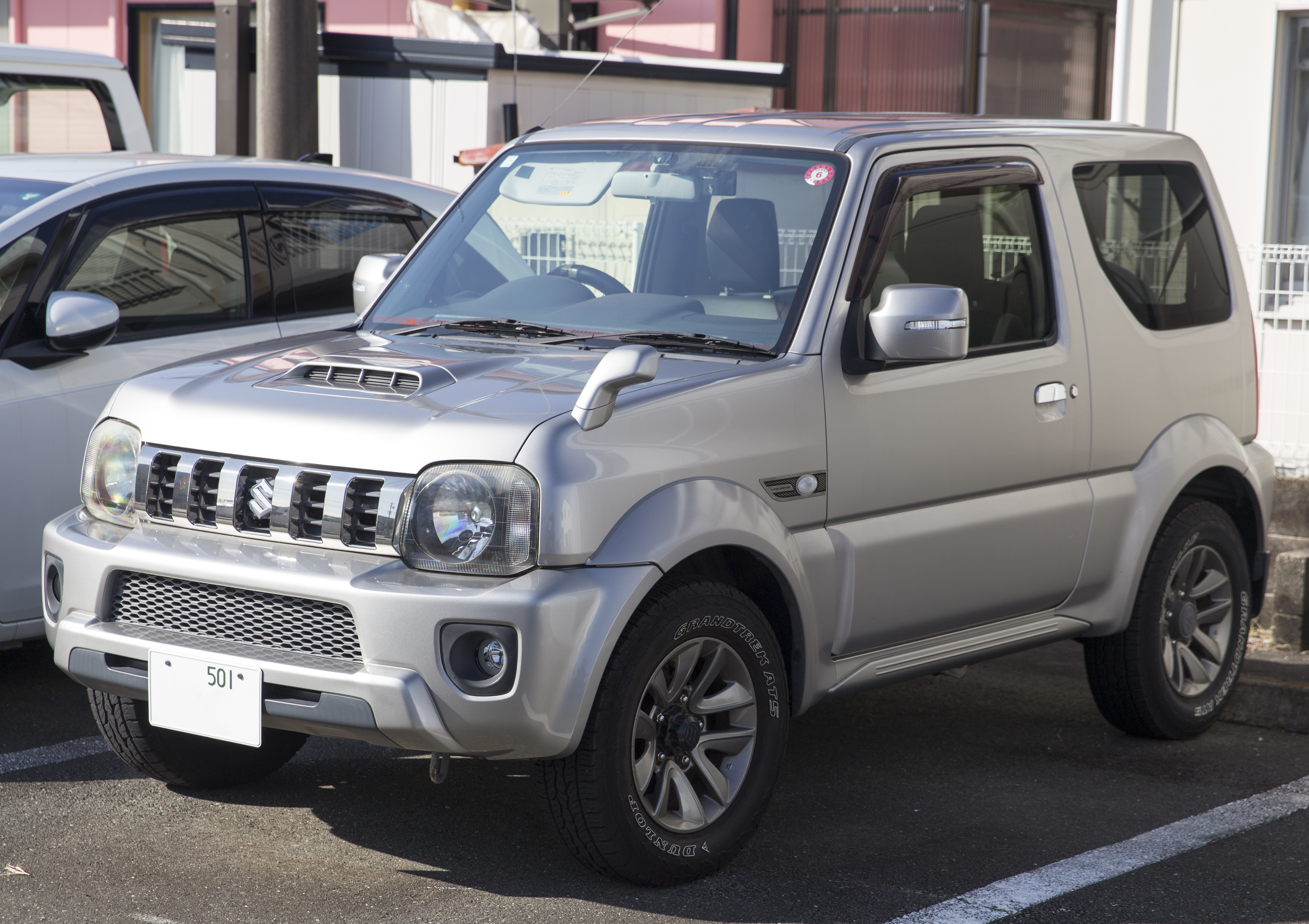
Jimny Sierra Land Venture (JB43; 2012 facelift)

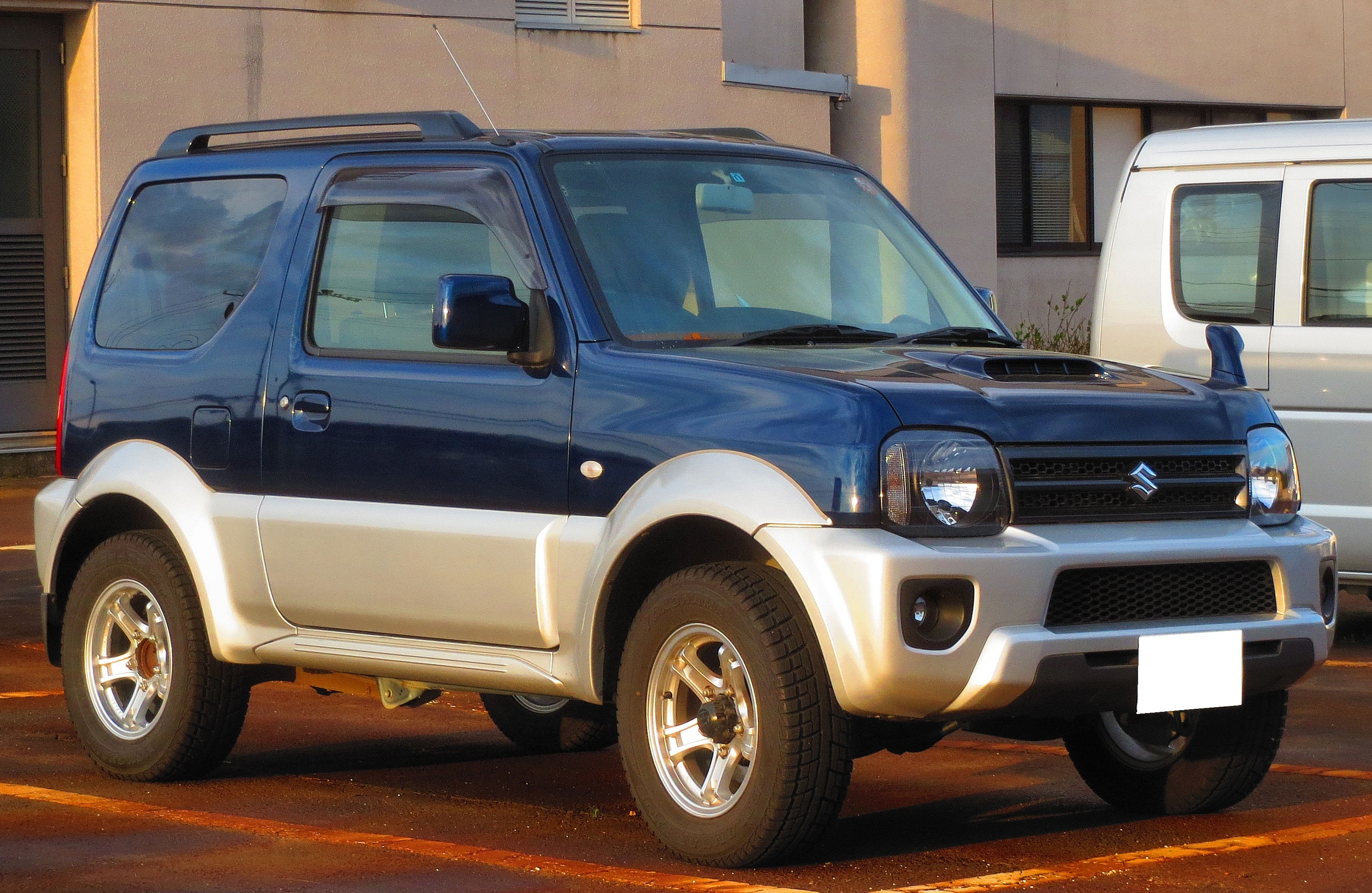
Jimny Sierra (JB43; 2012 facelift) with front mesh grille and two-tone exterior colour

=== Mazda AZ-Offroad ===
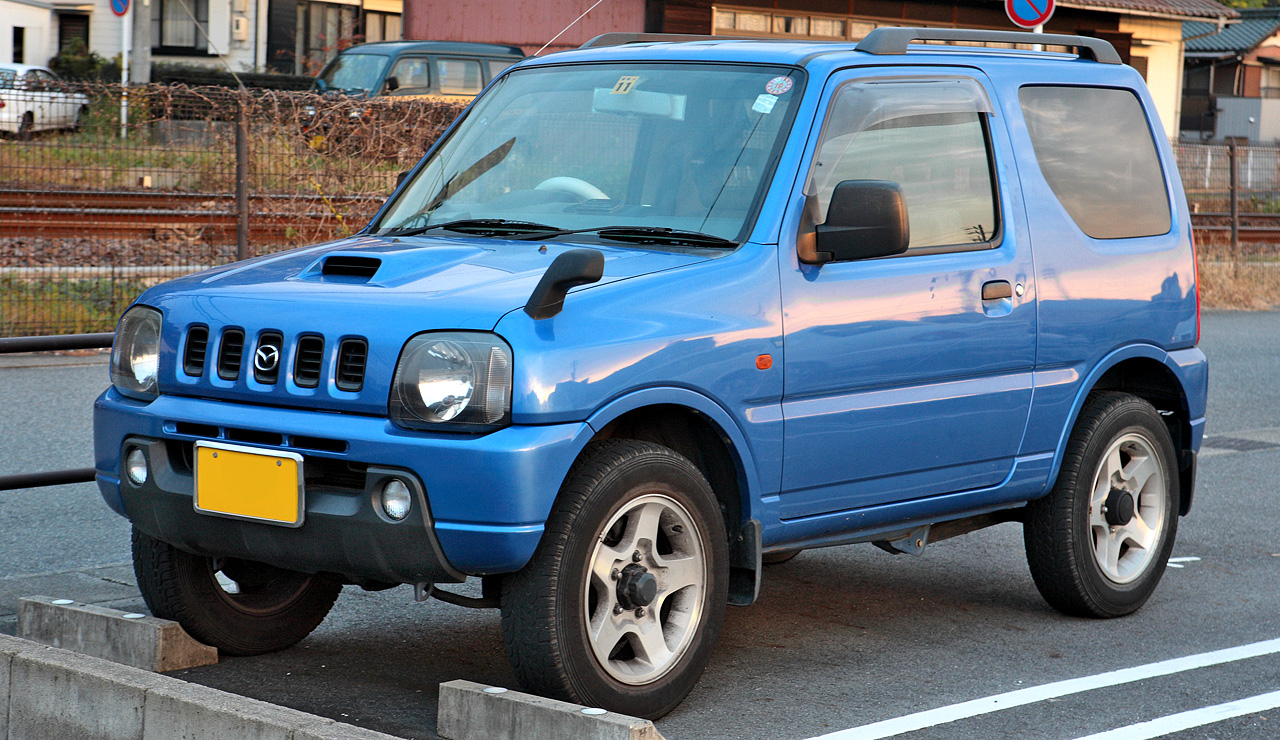
Pre-facelift Mazda AZ-Offroad

The Mazda AZ-Offroad, introduced in October 1998, is a rebadged Jimny. The AZ in the name refers to Autozam, Mazda's ill-fated small car marque. It is fitted with the turbocharged 658-cc DOHC Suzuki K6A engine, which produces 64 PS (47 kW). Manually operated four-wheel drive is standard with autolocking front hubs and low range, whilst an automatic transmission is optional.

Production was ceased in early 2014.

== Fourth generation (2018) ==
Fourth generation
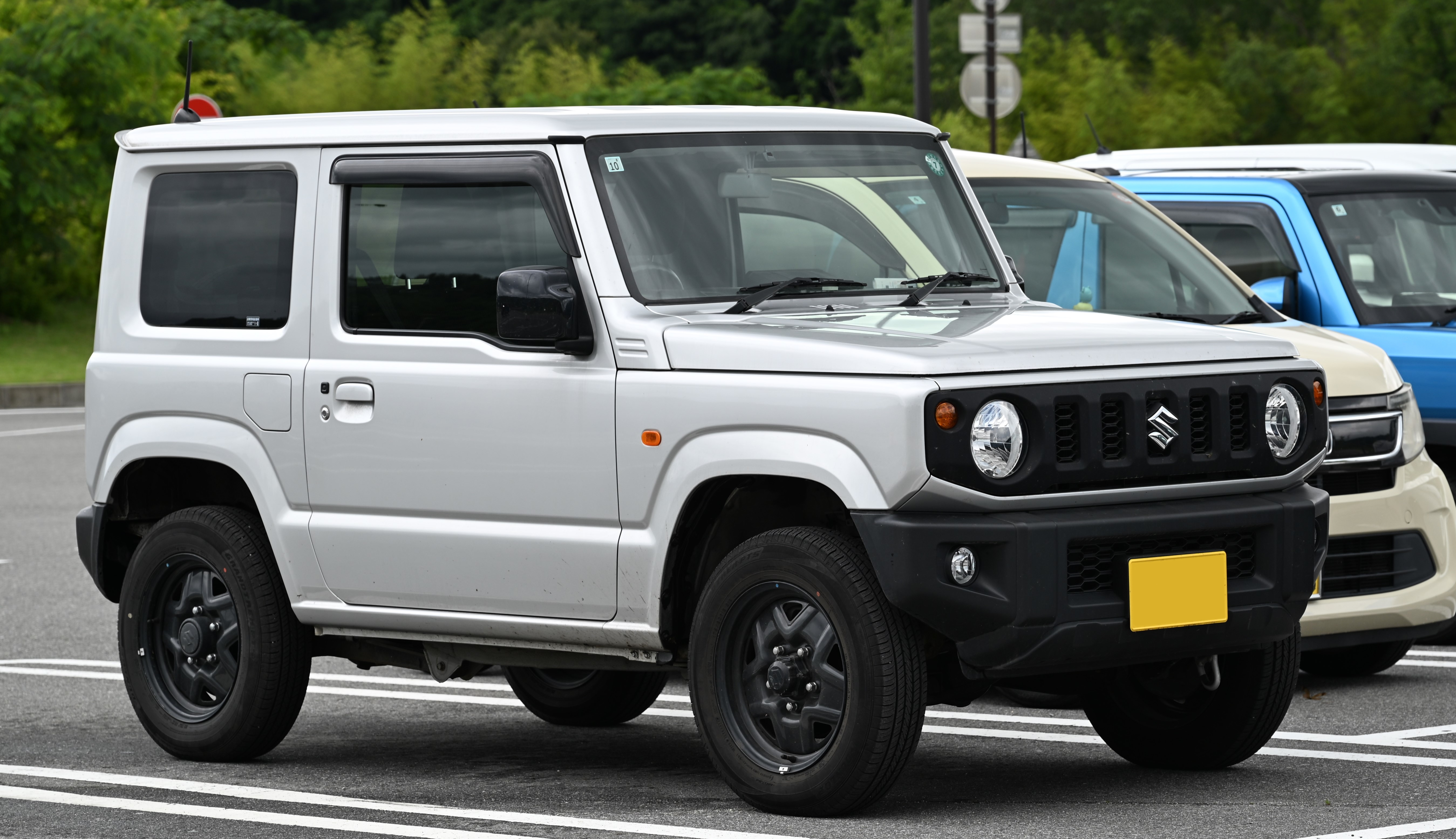
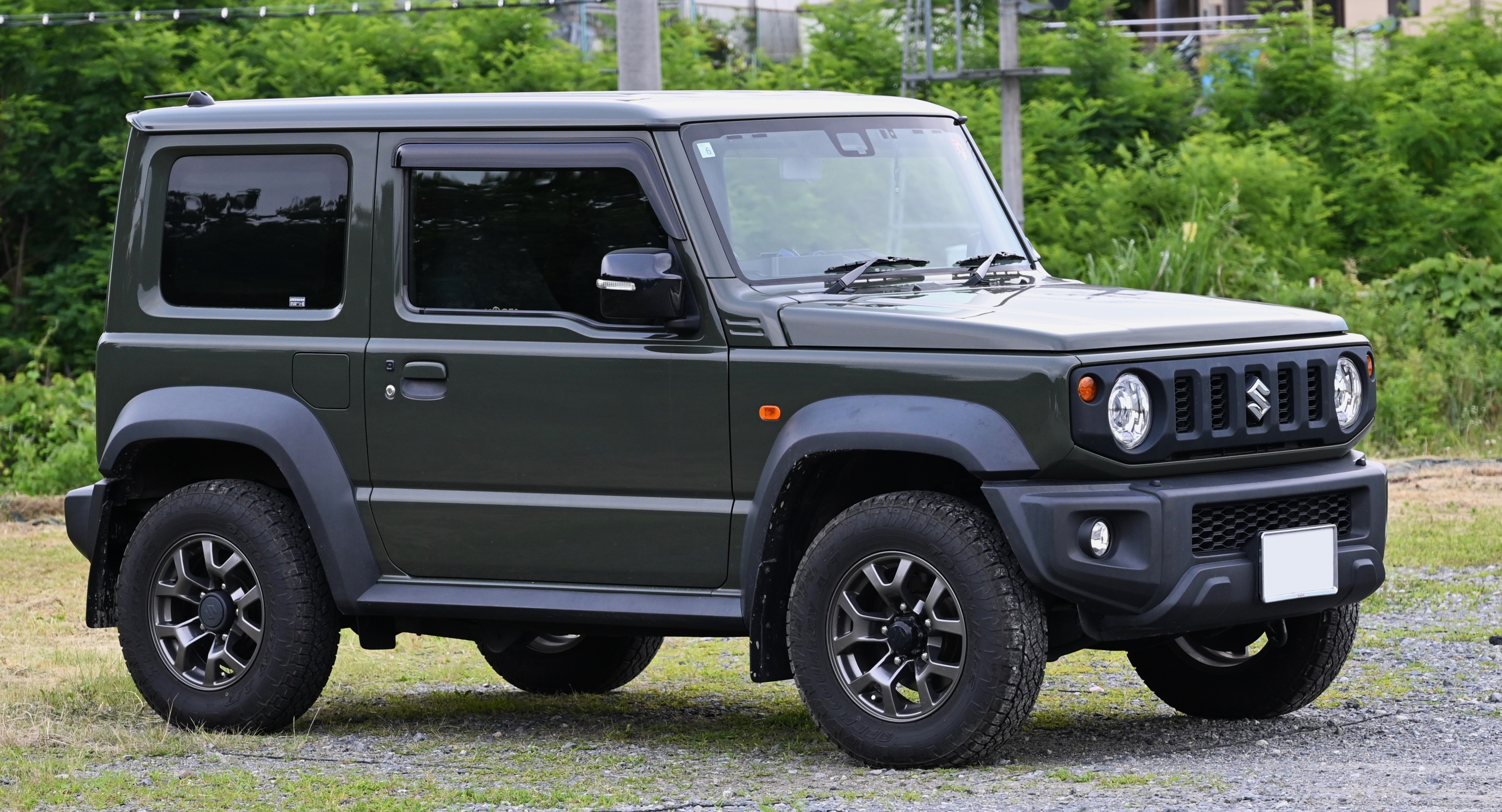
- The Jimny JB64 pictured top is compliant with Japan's kei-car class dimensions, omitting fender flares and having tucked-in bumpers. All other (export) versions have pronounced fender flares and larger bumpers.

Overview
- Model code: JB64W/JB74W (3-door); JC74W (5-door)
- Also called: Suzuki Jimny Sierra (1.5 L, Japan); Suzuki Jimny Nomade (5-door, Japan)
- Production: May 2018–present
- Assembly: Japan: Kosai, Shizuoka (Suzuki Kosai Plant); India: Gurgaon (Maruti Suzuki, 3-door and 5-door)
- Designer: Hiroyuki Yonezawa

Body and chassis
- Body style: 3-door SUV; 5-door SUV

Powertrain
- Engine: 658 cc R06A turbo I3; 1,462 cc K15B I4 (Jimny Sierra/Global)
- Transmission: 5-speed manual; 4-speed automatic

Dimensions
- Wheelbase: 2,250 mm (88.6 in) (3-door); 2,590 mm (102.0 in) (5-door)
- Length: 3,395 mm (133.7 in) (kei car, Japan); 3,550–3,645 mm (139.8–143.5 in) (global/Sierra); 3,985 mm (156.9 in) (5-door)
- Width: 1,475 mm (58.1 in) (kei car, Japan); 1,645 mm (64.8 in) (global/Sierra)
- Height: 1,725 mm (67.9 in) (kei car, Japan); 1,720–1,730 mm (67.7–68.1 in) (global/Sierra)
- Curb weight: 1,030–1,040 kg (2,270–2,290 lb) (kei car, Japan); 1,070–1,135 kg (2,359–2,502 lb) (global/Sierra); 1,195–1,210 kg (2,635–2,668 lb) (5-door)

The fourth generation Jimny and Jimny Sierra were launched in Japan on 5 July 2018, with styling reminiscent of the earlier LJ and SJ generations. Production commenced in Japan on 29 May 2018 at Suzuki's Kosai plant.

In January 2023, Suzuki released the long-wheelbase 5-door version of the Jimny, based on the Sierra version, using the larger, 1.5-litre K15B engine.

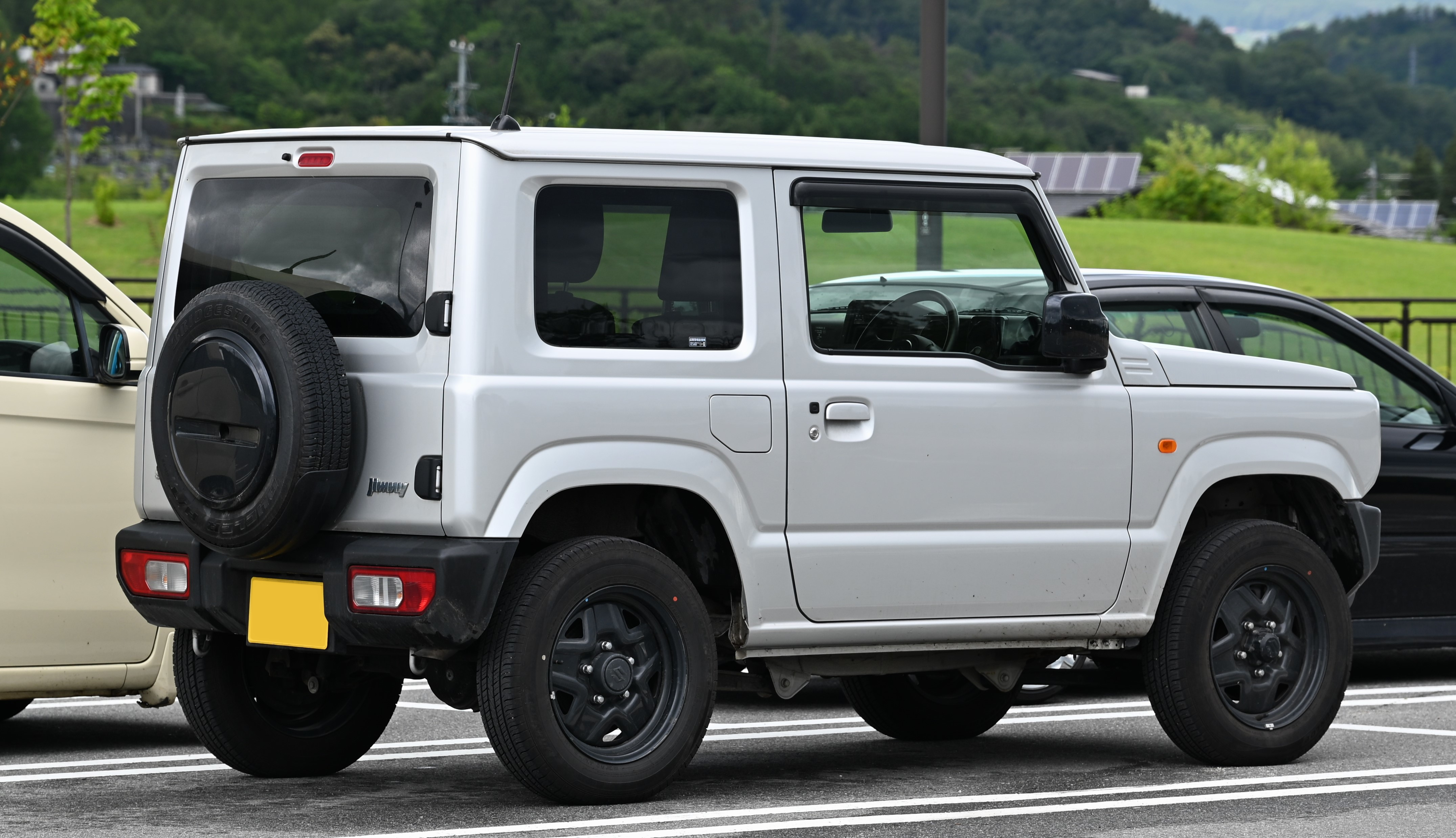
JB64 Jimny (kei car)

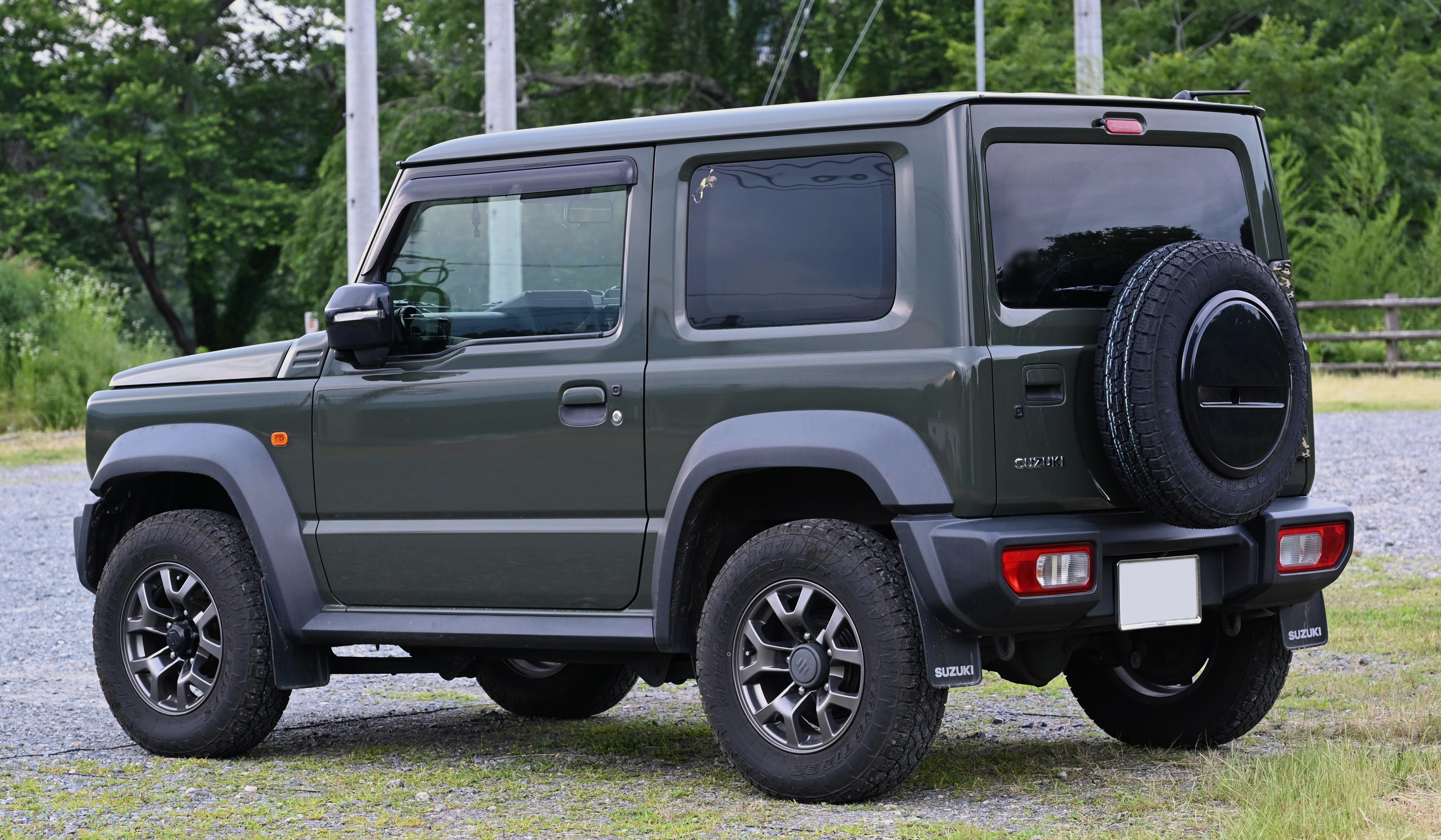
JB74 (Jimny Sierra)

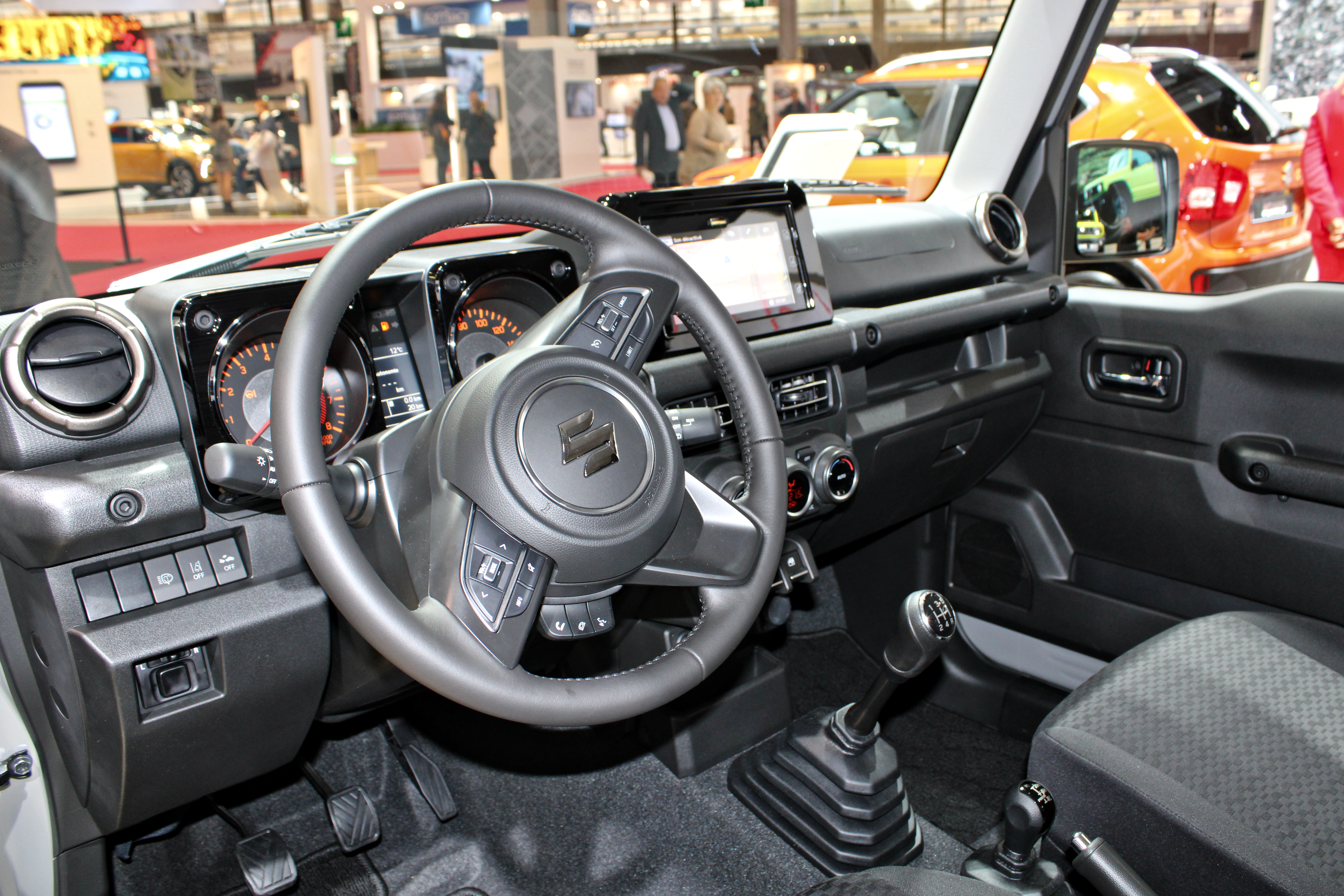
Interior

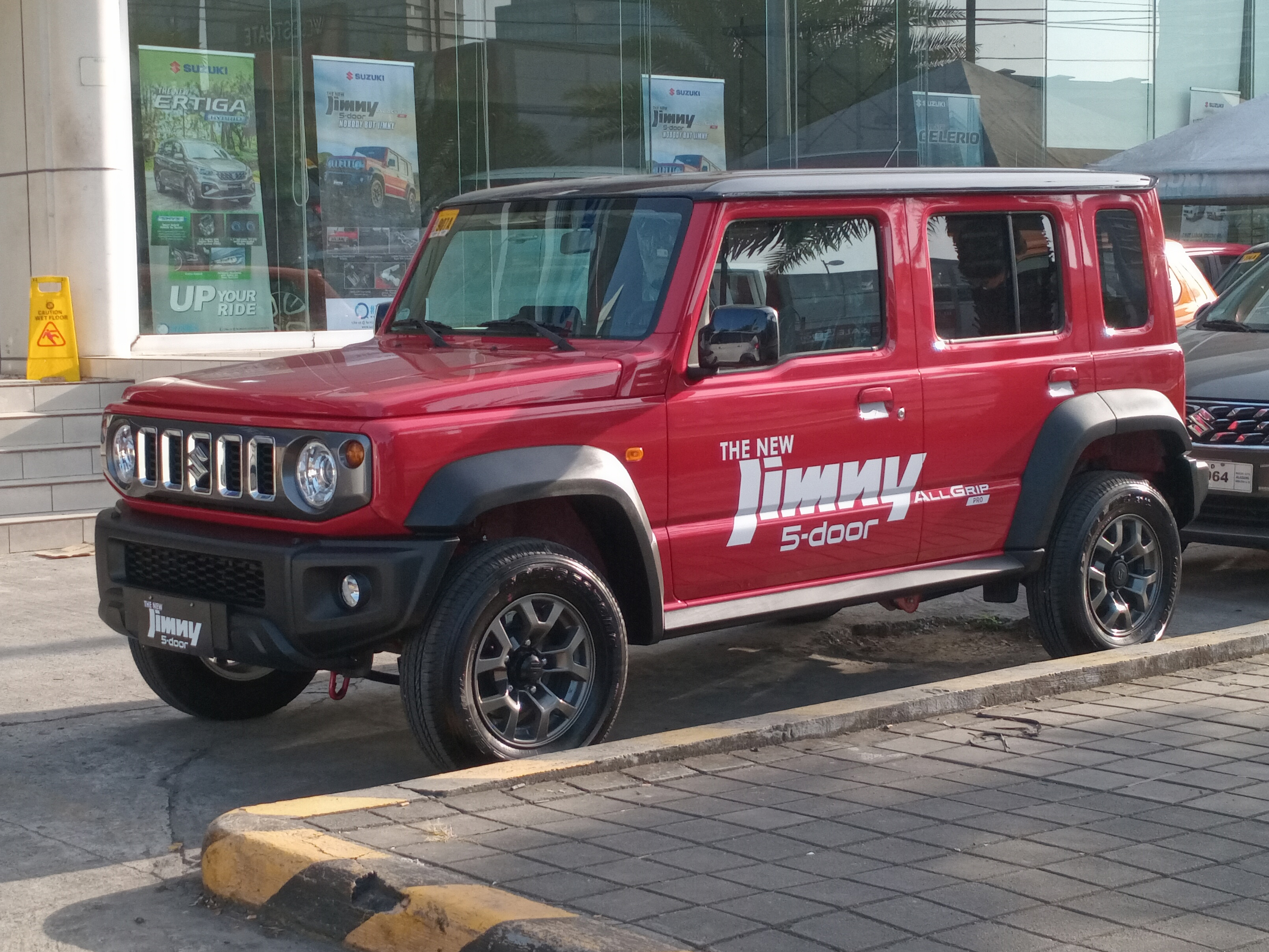
Suzuki Jimny 5-door (front)

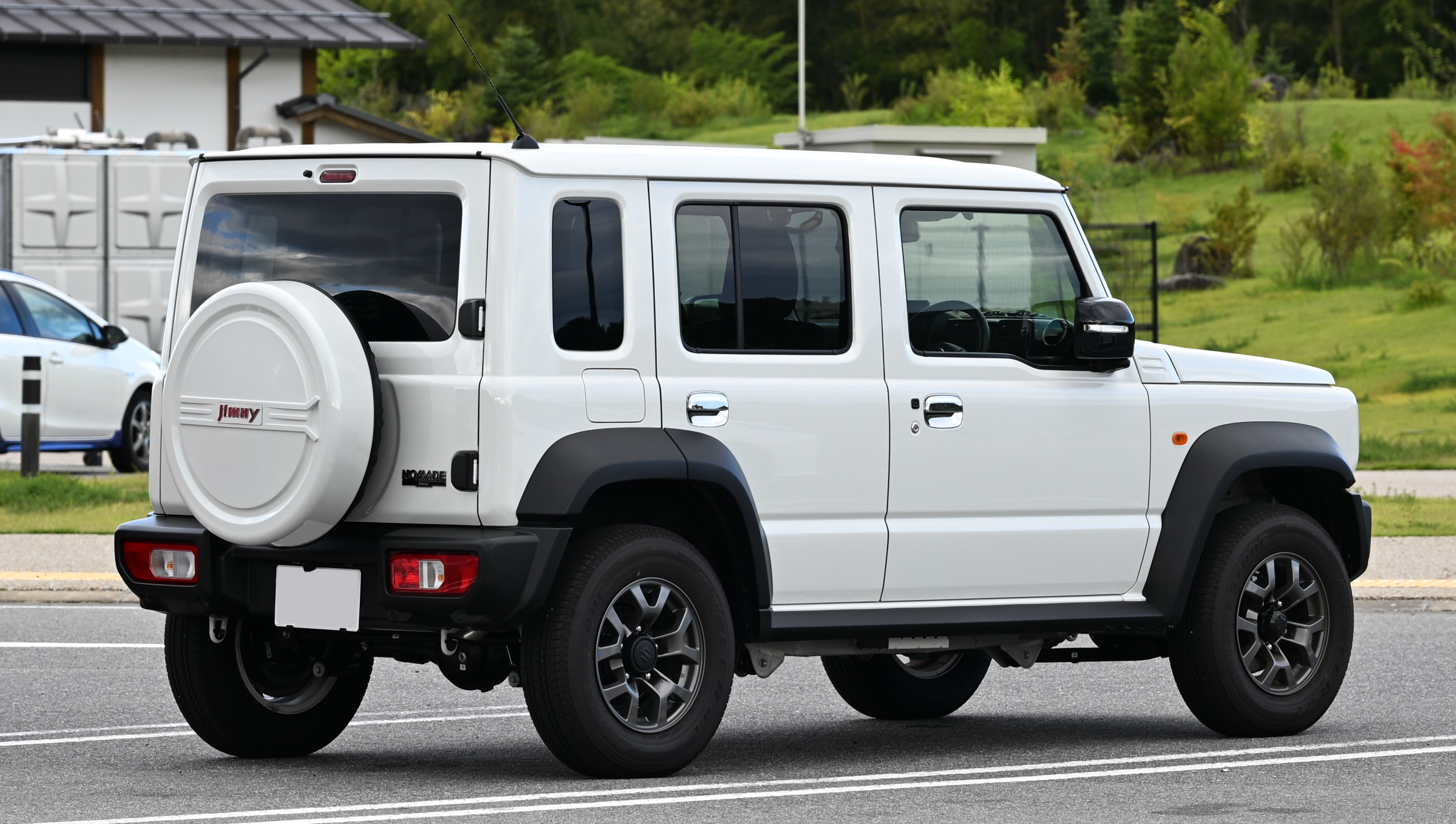
Suzuki Jimny 5-door (rear)

=== Design ===
The body-on-chassis design uses a ladder frame, 3-link rigid axle suspension with coil spring, and part-time four-wheel drive with low range transfer gear, marketed as ALLGRIP PRO. Transmission options are a 5-speed manual transmission and a 4-speed automatic.

The exterior has upright A-pillars, a flat clamshell bonnet/hood, driver and passenger window lines that dip at the front to extend visibility, a simple black grille with round headlamps, roof edge drip rails, and prominent wheel arch extensions. The interior rear luggage space can be expanded by folding twin rear seats, creating a 377-litre luggage space with a flat floor, five utility screw holes and four luggage anchors. The design results in an approach angle of 37 degrees, ramp breakover angle of 28 degrees and departure angle of 49 degrees.

The Jimny incorporates a series of safety features, marketed by Suzuki as Suzuki Safety Support. The Dual Sensor Brake Support (DSBS) system determines if there is a risk of forward collision and issues an audio and visual warning, increases braking force, or applies automatic braking to either avoid a collision or minimize damage. Other functions include lane departure warning, weaving alert function and high beam assist, which automatically switches between high and low beams.

=== Engines ===
The base Japanese market Jimny is powered by an R06A 658 cc, three-cylinder, turbocharged petrol engine, while the wide version (Jimny Sierra) has a newly developed K15B 1.5-litre four-cylinder naturally-aspirated petrol engine with 75 kW (102 PS) at 6,000 rpm, 138 N⋅m (102 lb⋅ft) at 4,400 rpm).

=== Markets ===
==== Asia ====
===== India =====
Assembly of the Jimny started in India since January 2021 as an export model. The 3-door Indian-made Jimny has been exported to African markets and countries in the Middle East.

In January 2023, the 5-door Jimny was introduced for the domestic market. The model was launched in India on 7 June 2023 with two trim levels: Zeta and Alpha, and is exclusively available at the Nexa dealership chain reserved for high-end Maruti Suzuki models. In October 2023, the 5-door Jimny began exporting to the Middle East, Latin America, South Africa, Southeast Asia and Japan.

===== Indonesia =====
The Jimny was launched in Indonesia on 18 July 2019 at the 27th Gaikindo Indonesia International Auto Show, after being previewed at the 26th Gaikindo Indonesia International Auto Show. For Indonesia, the Jimny is available in the sole unnamed trim and paired with either a 5-speed manual or a 4-speed automatic.

The Jimny 5-door was launched in Indonesia on 21 February 2024 at the 31st Indonesia International Motor Show. Like the 3-door model, the 5-door model is available in the sole unnamed trim and can be paired with either a 5-speed manual or a 4-speed automatic.

The Rhino Edition for the 5-door model was made available on 25 November 2024, features an additional accessories and exclusive white colour. Limited run of 100 units, and only 4-speed automatic option.

===== Japan =====
In Japan, the kei car version sold simply as the Jimny and the standard wheelbase version sold as the Jimny Sierra. The Jimny comes in XG, XL and XC trim levels, whereas, the Jimny Sierra comes in JL and JC trim levels. All variants have the option between a 5-speed manual or a 4-speed automatic.

The Jimny 5-door debuted in Japan as Jimny Nomade on 30 January 2025, in a sole trim level: FC.

===== Malaysia =====
The Jimny was launched in Malaysia on 30 September 2021, in the sole variant, paired only with a 4-speed automatic. The Arctic model was introduced for the 3-door model in November 2024. In June 2026, the AllGrip Plus and Rhino Plus variants were introduced for the 3-door model.

The Jimny 5-door was launched in Malaysia on 30 July 2024, in the sole variant, paired only with a 4-speed automatic.

===== Philippines =====
The Jimny was launched in the Philippines on 8 March 2019, with two trim levels: GL (with manual) and GLX (with automatic). The Rhino Edition for the 3-door model was made available on 25 November 2024. In February 2026, the 3-door model became standard with the Suzuki Safety Support system, the addition of side airbags and curtain airbags, front parking sensors, the GL trim became standard with a reversing camera, and the GLX trim received a new 9-inch touchscreen infotainment system and an updated coloured MID display.

The Jimny 5-door was launched in the Philippines on 25 January 2024, with two trim levels: GL (with manual) and GLX (with automatic). The Rhino Edition for the 5-door model was made available on 6 January 2025.

===== Singapore =====
The Jimny was launched in Singapore on 27 April 2019, in the sole variant, paired only with a 4-speed automatic.

The Jimny 5-door was launched in Singapore on 9 October 2025, in the sole Standard variant, paired only with a 4-speed automatic.

===== Taiwan =====
The Jimny was launched in Taiwan on 16 May 2019, in the sole variant, paired only with a 4-speed automatic. During its time on sale in Taiwan, Suzuki temporarily paused Jimny imports three times.

===== Thailand =====
The Jimny was launched in Thailand on 27 March 2019 at the 40th Bangkok International Motor Show, in a sole unnamed trim, it is available with either a 5-speed manual or a 4-speed automatic. The Off-road Edition model was made available on 1 December 2024. In May 2026, the Jimny became standard with the Suzuki Safety Support system, the addition of side airbags and curtain airbags, and received a new 9-inch touchscreen infotainment system.

===== Vietnam =====
The Jimny was launched in Vietnam on 10 April 2024, in the sole variant, paired only with a 4-speed automatic.

==== Europe ====
The Jimny made its European debut starting in Germany in October 2018.

In 2020, the Jimny was discontinued from European markets due to its high carbon dioxide emissions and stringent European emission standards. It was reintroduced in the middle of 2021 as a commercial vehicle that is subjected to less stringent European emissions standards, with the rear seats removed and a partition separates the boot space from the front seats. It was withdrawn from sale in 2025.

==== GCC ====
The Jimny 3-door was launched in the GCC markets in February 2021, it is available in two trim levels, GL (with manual) and GLX (with automatic).

The Jimny 5-door was launched in the GCC markets on 1 November 2023.

==== Latin America ====
===== Mexico =====
The Jimny was launched in Mexico on 12 November 2020, in a sole GLX trim, it is available with either a 5-speed manual or a 4-speed automatic. The 2021 model year Jimny was sold out in three days after the first 1,000 reserved units.

==== Oceania ====
===== Australia =====
The Jimny was launched in Australia on 24 January 2019, in a sole GLX trim, it is available with either a 5-speed manual or a 4-speed automatic. The entry-level Lite trim was added in June 2021. The Lite trim has steel wheels, headlights uses halogen units instead of LED, and the touchscreen head unit has been replaced with a basic audio head DIN unit. In February 2025, production of the Jimny 3-door for the Australian market was temporarily paused as the model did not meet new ADR safety regulations mandated on 1 March 2025 in Australia, while the Jimny XL was unaffected by the new regulations. Production for Australia restarted in November 2025, for release in early 2026 as an updated model. The changes of the updated 3-door model were the inclusion of adaptive cruise control, Dual Sensor Brake Support II, lane-keep assist, and front and rear parking sensors. The Lite and Jimny trims received new 7-inch and 9-inch touchscreen infotainment systems, respectively, with Android Auto and Apple CarPlay connectivity.

The Jimny 5-door was launched in Australia as the Jimny XL on 5 December 2023, in a sole variant paired with either a 5-speed manual or a 4-speed automatic. In July 2025, deliveries of the Jimny XL in Australia were temporarily halted following "[Suzuki] investigation an issue" and deliveries later resumed in Australia on 27 August 2025. A special edition Jimny XL Rhino is set to start deliveries in July 2026, being limited to 250 units.

===== New Zealand =====
The Jimny was launched in New Zealand on 14 March 2019 as the Jimny Sierra. It was available in the sole variant, paired with either a 5-speed manual or a 4-speed automatic.

The Jimny 5-door was launched in New Zealand on 23 January 2024, in a sole variant, paired with either a 5-speed manual or a 4-speed automatic.

==== South Africa ====
The Jimny was launched in South Africa on 2 November 2018, with two trim levels: GA and GLX, it is available with either a 5-speed manual or a 4-speed automatic. The new mid-range GL trim was added in March 2022. In March 2026, the 3-door model gained additional standard equipment, while the GA and GL trims for the 3-door model were discontinued, leaving the GX trim as the sole trim choice.

The Jimny 5-door was launched in South Africa on 14 November 2023 with two trim levels: GL and GLX.

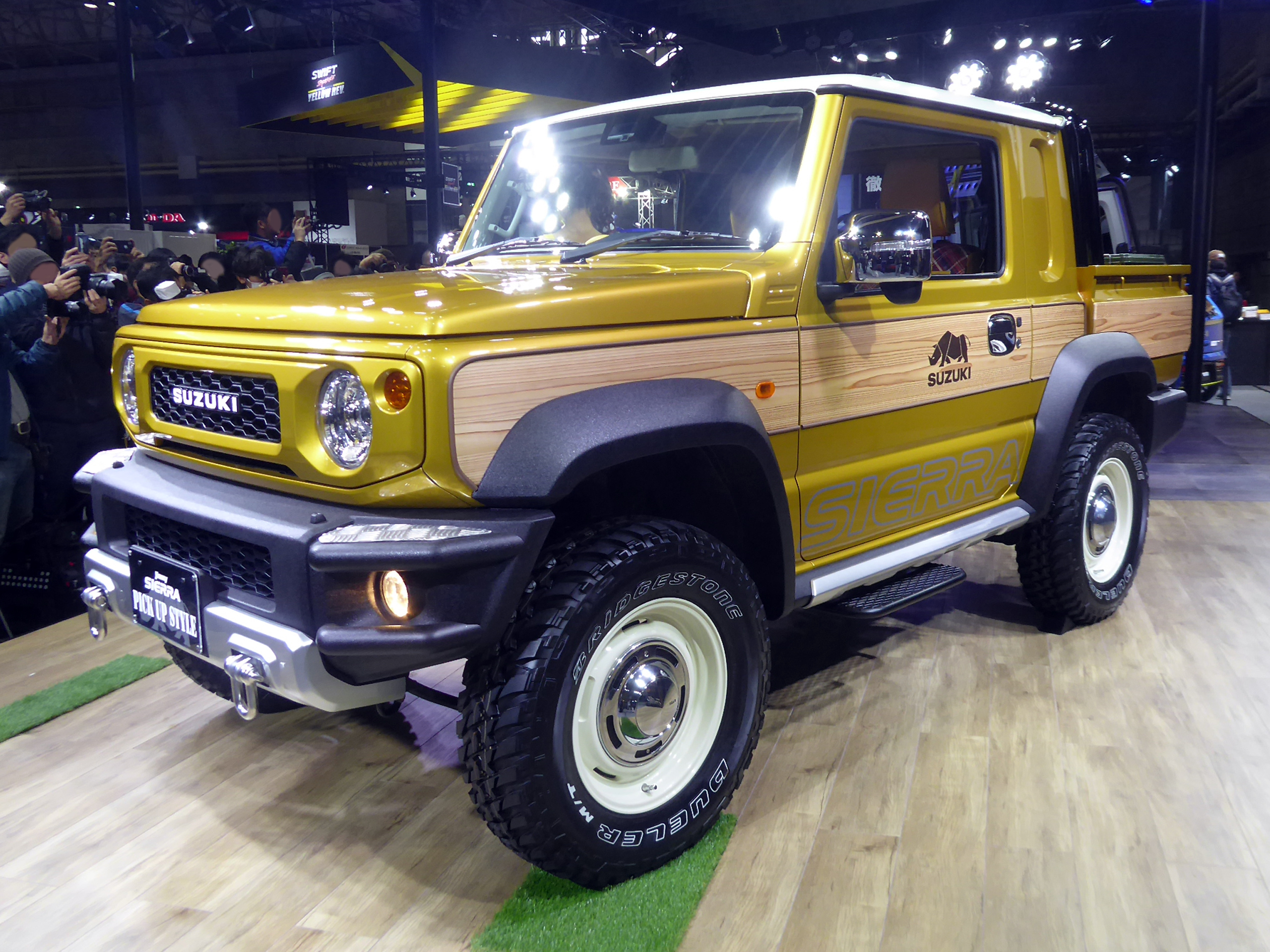
Suzuki Jimny Sierra Pick Up Style Concept (JB74)

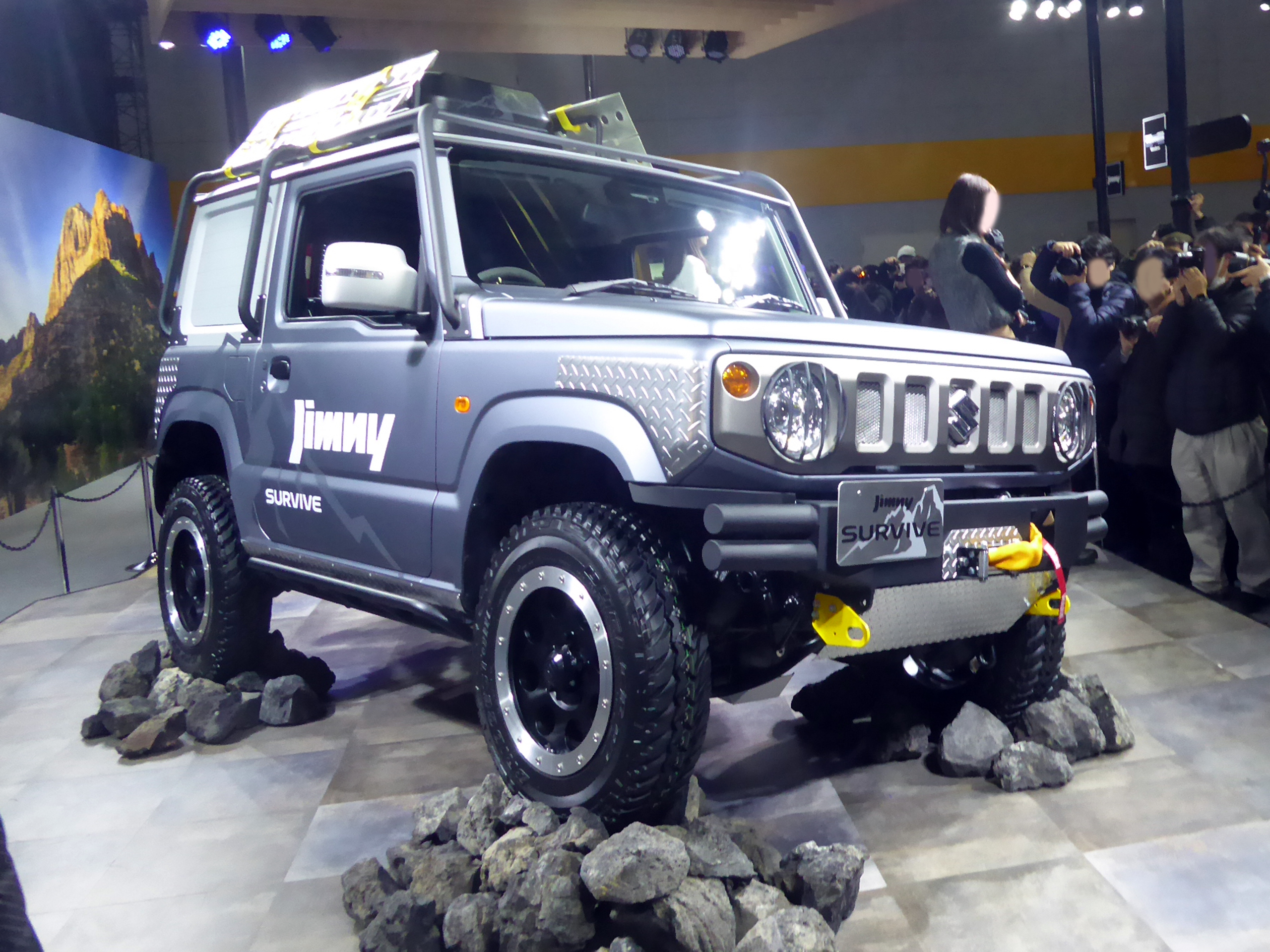
Suzuki Jimny Survive Concept (JB64)

=== Safety ===
Euro NCAP test results* Suzuki Jimny (3-door, Europe) (2018)
Test	Points	%
Overall:	3 /5 stars	
Adult occupant:	27.9	73%
Child occupant:	41.4	84%
Pedestrian:	25.1	52%
Safety assist:	6.5	50%

ANCAP test results* Suzuki Jimny (2018, aligned with Euro NCAP)
Test	Points	%
Overall:	5 /5 stars	
Adult occupant:	27.9	73%
Child occupant:	41.3	84%
Pedestrian:	25	52%
Safety assist:	6.5	50%

== Electric version ==
An electric version of the Jimny was confirmed and scheduled to release around 2030. The company president later seemingly ruled out an electric version saying it would ruin the best part of 4x4.

== Development history ==
These four collapsed tables cover the development history of the Jimny in the Japanese domestic market, with notable export variations and developments also noted.

Jimny development in the 1st generation (1970–1981)

First generation Jimny
1.1
LJ10, 1970–1972. 359 cc air-cooled 2-stroke I2 FB engine.
1.1.1
- 25 PS (18 kW), 3 seats.
1970.04-1971.01
1.1.2
- 27 PS (20 kW)
1971.01-1972.05
1.2
LJ20, 1972–76. 359 cc water-cooled 2-stroke I2 L50 engine.
1.2.1
- 28 PS (21 kW), horizontal bars in grille.
- LJ20V hardtop version added.
1972.05-1973.11
1.2.2
- Orange turn signals.
- Front marker lamp and turn signal lamp separated.
- 4-seater with spare tire mounted on hood (LJ20F) added.
1973.11-1975.12
1.2.3
- Emissions regulations lower output to 26 PS (19 kW).
1975.12-1976.05
1.3
SJ10, a.k.a. Jimny55 or LJ50. 1975–1981. 539 cc 2-stroke I3 LJ50 engine.
1.3.1
- 26 PS (19 kW), 33 PS (24 kW) in some export markets.
- Export only until 1976.06.
- Improved hood.
- All models now 4-seaters.
1975.09-1977.06
1.3.2
- New, taller engine hood with vents on leading edge.
- Stronger rear differential.
- Widened rear fenders due to 100 mm (3.9 in) wider track, front and rear.
- Fuel tank increased from 26 to 40 L.
1977.06-1978.11
1.3.3
- New grille with lower mounted head lamps.
- Metal doors available as of 1979.
1978.11-1981.05
1.4
SJ20, a.k.a. Jimny8 or LJ80. 1977–1983. 797 cc SOHC I4 F8A engine.
1.4.1
- "Big"-engined model, mainly for export markets.
- On sale in Japan from 1977.09 on.
- The SJ20's chassis improvements were also applied to the SJ10.
1977.06-1978.11
1.4.2
- New grille with lower mounted head lamps.
- Metal doors available as of 1979, as well as a longer pickup version (LJ81).
1978.11-1982.08

Jimny development in the 2nd generation (1981–1998)

Second generation Jimny
2.1
SJ30, a.k.a. Jimny 550. 1981–1987. 539 cc 2-stroke I3 LJ50 engine.
2.1.1
- All new, more modern design.
- Two-stroke engine is retained, with power increased to 28 PS (21 kW).
- 4MT.
1981.05-1983.07
2.1.2
- Transistor ignition introduced.
- Soft door version discontinued.
- Deluxe Van receives front disc brakes.
1983.07-1984.06
2.1.3
- New, all plastic dashboard.
1984.06-1986.01
2.1.4
- SJ30 receives interior from JA51/71.
1986.01-1987.04
2.1.5
- ELR seatbelts introduced.
- Lineup reduced to a full-metal door softtop and a deluxe Van.
1987.04-1987.11
2.2
SJ40, a.k.a. Jimny 1000 or SJ410. 1981–1998. 970 cc 4-stroke I4 F10A engine.
2.2.1
- On sale in Japan from 1982.08.
- 45 PS (33 kW) for export, 52 PS (38 kW) in domestic market.
- Wider and with bigger wheels than the Jimny 550, with an LWB pickup model available.
- From the autumn of 1983, an LWB, 6-seater soft-top model was available.
- Distinguished from SJ413 and Samurai by having a metal grille with vertical slats.
- 4-speed manual gearbox.
- Non-power assisted drum brakes at all four wheels.
- Hand brake brakes the transmission at the rear output from the transfer case, instead of braking the brake drums in each rear wheel directly (like in most passenger vehicles).
1982.08-1984.06
2.2.2
- Improved interior as per JA51.
- Production continues in other countries until 1998.
1984.06-1985
2.3
JA51, a.k.a. Jimny 1300, SJ413 and Samurai. 1984–1993. 1324 cc 4-stroke I4 G13A engine.
2.3.1
- Bigger engine.
- New plastic grille with horizontal slats.
- Improved interior.
- 63–70 PS (46–51 kW), depending on market.
- New 5-speed manual gearbox.
- Hand brake in early production years (up to cca 1986) had the same design as in SJ410, which was later changed to operate directly on the rear wheel drum brakes like in most passenger vehicles.
1984.08-1988
2.3.2
- A 10 cm wider edition of JA51 also produced and badged as "Samurai" in some regions like USA and Europe.
- Introduced in the US in 1985 for model year 1986.
- Distinghished from SJ413 by having larger wheel fender flares, side turn signal lamps positioned at the rear of the front wheel fenders (near the side doors) instead on the front of the fenders as in SJ413, and having a "Samurai" badge in that front position instead of the turn signal lamps.
- Different design of the interior console, instrument panel, seats etc.
- A glassed high-roof version was added on 1985.12.
- 100 "Winter Action Special" vehicles were released in October 1986.
1985.xx-1995.xx
2.3.3
- Fuel injected version gradually introduced.
- Improved dashboard.
- Production of the "Samurai" edition almost fully replaced the production of SJ413, although the "Samurai" edition is sold under countless other marketing names.
1988–1990.02
2.3.4
- New bumpers and grille.
- Revised suspension to improve on-road manners.
1990.02-1993.05
2.3.5
- Also produced by Spanish manufacturer Santana Motors.
- Such vehicles had a certain level of "technical autonomy" (example: softer springs for improved on-road comfort, finer interior cloths, etc.), but they more or less followed the changes to the model which Suzuki did during the course of time.
- Santana produced this model until 2004, well after Suzuki ceased its production.
- Curiously, Santana produced this model for almost 5 years alongside the production of JB33 and JB43.
- Around 1996, Santana changed the front radiator grille and head lamp design to resemble JB32 (side turn lamps next to the head lamps) and made the front bumpers more round and without the side turn lamps.
1986.xx-2004.xx
2.4
???, a.k.a. Diesel Samurai. 1998–2004. Two diesel engines.
2.4.1
- Spanish manufacturer Santana Motors introduces a diesel Samurai edition with PSA's XUD9 1.9-litre (1905 cm3) turbodiesel engine (EURO2 emission spec.), producing 46 kW (63 hp).
1998.xx-2001.xx
2.4.2
- Santana replaces PSA's engine in the diesel Samurai with a Renault F8Q 1.9-litre (1870 cm3) diesel engine (non-turbo) (EURO3 emission spec.), producing 47 kW (64 hp).
- Renault's engine reduced the fuel consumption considerably (about 1.5 L / 100 km combined cycle) compared to PSA's engine, at the cost of non-turbo performance.
2001.xx-2004.xx
2.5
JA71, 1986–1990. 543 cc turbocharged, fuel injected F5A engine.
2.5.1
- 42 hp (31 kW), Turbo EPi four-stroke with 5MT.
- upgraded interior.
1986.01-1987.03
2.5.2
- New grille with integrated fog lamps.
- "Panoramic" high-roof version added, as is the intercooler.
- Power is up to 52 hp (39 kW).
- Base-spec van available with non-intercooled 38 PS (28 kW) turbo engine.
1987.11-1990.02
2.6
JA11, 1990–1995. 657 cc fuel injected, turbocharged, and intercooled F6A engine.
2.6.1
- Bigger engine and larger front bumper reflect new Kei Jidosha standards.
- Fog lamps mounted on bumper, ahead of grille.
- All models receive a new 55 PS (40 kW) engine.
- Suspension modified to improve ride and stability.
1990.02-1991.06
2.6.2
- New, body-coloured grille.
- Power increased to 58 PS (43 kW).
- Radiator fan coupling changed.
1991.06-1992.07
2.6.3
- Optional PS and AT introduced.
1992.07-1994.04
2.6.4
- Safety equipment improved.
- Turbo warning lamp removed, replaced with seat belt warning lamp.
- Cheap trim HA Van discontinued.
1994.04-1995.02
2.6.5
- Engine upgraded to 64 hp (48 kW) spec from Alto Works.
1995.02-1995.11
2.7
JB31, a.k.a. Jimny 1300 Sierra, Samurai. 1993–1995. 1298 cc fuel injected G13BA engine.
2.7.1
- 70 PS (51 kW) (JDM, differs in export markets).
- Bigger fenders to fit 205/70 R15 tires.
- More upmarket spec than JA51, more comfortable interior.
- 3AT introduced 93.11.
1993.05-1995.11
2.8
JA12/22, 1995–1998. 657/658 cc fuel injected, turbocharged, and intercooled F6A/K6A engines.
2.8.1
- New coil sprung chassis, more aerodynamic front and new bumpers.
- 64 PS (47 kW) engine retained, except top-rung models which got the DOHC four-valve K6A engine - officially also with 64 PS (47 kW).
- K6A versions got standard electric power steering, lesser models with PS made do with hydraulic.
1995.11-1997.05
2.8.2
- Air locking hubs added.
1997.05-1998.09
2.9
JB32, a.k.a. Jimny 1300 Sierra, Samurai. 1995–1998. 1,298 cc fuel injected G13BB or G13BA (export) engine.
2.9.1
- 85 PS (63 kW) in JDM, but 70 PS or 51 kW in most export markets.
- Chassis modifications as per JA12/22, but longer and wider than 660 cc versions.
- Track also wider, by 110 mm (4.3 in).
1995.11-1998.01

Jimny development in the 3rd generation (1998–2018)

Third generation Jimny
3.1
JB33, a.k.a. Jimny Wide. 1998–2005. 1,298 cc 16-valve SOHC G13BB engine.
3.1.1
- The larger-engined third generation was introduced first.
- Beefier suspension and wider track also meant wider fenders than on JB23.
- 5MT or 4AT.
1998.01-2001
3.1.2
- Modified tie rod ends to improve stability and handling.
1998.06-2001
3.1.3
- Production also starts in Spain in Santana Motors vehicle factory in Spain.
- All convertible ("canvas/plastic top") Jimnys were produced by Santana.
- Santana also produced standard "closed body" Jimnys.
- All Jimnys made by Santana had a certain level of "technical autonomy" - some vehicle parts are different.
- Santana continued producing the JB33 model (with G13BB engine) for several years after Suzuki stopped the production in 2001. Those were mostly convertible body vehicles.
1999–2005
3.2
JB23, 1998-2018. 658 cc fuel injected, turbocharged, and intercooled K6A engine.
3.2.1
- More rounded body, still body on frame.
- Carryover engine.
- Basic XA, XL and top XC models all available with 5MT or 4AT.
1998.10-1999.10
3.2.2
- Improved safety and emissions equipment.
- Catalyst relocated.
- ABS and airbag now standard.
1999.10-2000.04
3.2.3
- ABS modified. 2000.09 2WD Jimny L introduced.
2000.04-2002.01
3.2.4
- Grille now separate from hood.
- Engine modifications.
2002.01-2004.10
3.2.5
- Dashboard modified, as is transfer case lever.
- Transfer case ratio increases.
2004.10-2005.10
3.2.6
- Outside mirrors changed.
- Manual head lamp adjustment introduced.
2005.10-2008.06
3.2.7
- Changes to cylinder head improve low-end torque.
2008.06-2018.02
3.3
JB43, a.k.a. Jimny Wide or Jimny Sierra. 2000–2018. 1328 cc 16-valve DOHC M13A engine (later with VVT).
3.3.1
- New high tech engine, 88 hp (66 kW), replaces JB33 in Japan.
2000.01-2000.04
3.3.2
- Also produced by Santana Motors vehicle factory in Spain until the factory became defunct.
- All convertible ("canvas/plastic top") Jimnys were produced by Santana.
- Santana also produced standard "closed body" Jimnys.
- All Jimnys made by Santana had a certain level of "technical autonomy" - some vehicle parts are different.
2000–2011
3.3.3
- Engine modified.
2000.04-2002.01
3.3.4
- Finer cloth upholstery for seats.
2001–2005
3.3.5
- Name changed back to Jimny Sierra in certain markets.
2002.01-2004.10
3.3.6
- 4WD transmission system is now button-operated instead of the previous lever-operated system (transfer box is now shifted by a 4WD control computer through the use of electromagnets instead of a mechanical lever, and the 4WD control computer has a different operating logic).
- Front interior completely redesigned (dash board, instrument panel, controls, ventilation, steering wheel, seats, etc.).
- Rear seats completely redesigned - the top (back support) parts are now separate units from the bottom part and the bottom part is now a single wide bench piece for both rear passengers.
- The casing of outside mirrors is thicker.
- Manual adjustment of head lamps introduced.
- New alloy wheels with a 5-spoke construction.
2005.06-2018
3.3.7
- New (2nd edition) front bumper, which is much deeper than the seminal 1st edition one, and therefore vehicle's approach angle is significantly compromised.
- New bumper was designed to accommodate the intercooler in JB53 Jimnys with the new K9K 266 engine, and Suzuki decided to bolt it onto JB43 models as well, with no technical necessity.
2005.12-2012
3.3.8
- M13A engine modified to include VVT technology, and through it the engine gained a bit more power at a bit lower revolutions per minute, as well as slightly better fuel economy.
2005.12-2018
3.3.9
- Minor dash and air conditioner changes.
- Minor change in the logic of the 4WD control computer to automatically sequentially shift from 2WD-H through 4WD-H into 4WD-L (and vice versa).
2008.06-2018
3.3.10
- New separate radiator grille and bonnet with an aggressive overall look.
- Bonnet has a fake air intake bulge (different design than the fake bonnet bulge on diesel JB53 Jimnys).
- New front bumper model (3rd edition) which is shallower than the 2nd edition bumper model, but still deeper than the 1st edition bumper model.
- ISOFIX child seat anchors added to the back side of rear seats and to the cabin floor below the rear seats.
- Rear bench seat (bottom part of the seat) now has a centre hole cut-out to allow both rear seat belt buckles to be easily tucked in when not used, so that they do not stick out from the floor.
- All seat head rests changed to be non-hollow, and the rear seats' head rests can now be folded down over the seats (when unused) so that the top of the head rest is on almost the same level as the top of the seat. This enables improved visibility through the rear window and easier (un)loading of cargo from the rear door opening over the rear seats. It also enables the upper part of the rear seats to be folded all the way forward without having to remove the head rest first.
- Additional side impact reinforcements in side doors.
2012–2014
3.3.11
- Gear shift indicator, TPMS, ESC and TC added as mandatory in certain markets (for example European Union), and as an option in others.
- ESC works only in 2WD-H and 4WD-H transmission modes (it turns OFF automatically in 4WD-L mode) and essentially works only when braking. Can be turned ON/OFF manually.
- TC works only in 4WD-L transmission mode and it turns ON automatically when entering that mode. It is effective in off-road cross-axle situations for example. Can be turned ON/OFF manually.
- Instrument panel and steering wheel completely redesigned.
- Seats' cloth upholstery has a new pattern.
- New type of alloy wheels (double-spoked).
2014–2018
3.4
JB53, 2003–2011. 1461 cc Direct injection turbodiesel K9K engine by Renault.
3.4.1
- 65 PS (48 kW) K9K 700 engine.
- Marketing name of the diesel Jimny edition is "DDiS".
- Vehicles built both by Suzuki in Japan and by Santana Motors in Spain and both sold primarily in Europe, to satisfy European market's need for diesels.
- Engine proved to be rather troublesome (fuel injection system, crankshaft plating, etc.).
- Available both as a standard closed body and as a "cabrio" body.
- "Cabrio" vehicles built exclusively by Santana.
- Exterior design, interior design and the 4WD transmission system is the same as in JB43 model from the same time period.
- The only visual difference between a petrol and a DDiS Jimny is the presence of a prominent fake air intake bulge on the bonnet (added to accommodate the top of the K9K engine in the engine bay).
2003.12-2005.06
3.4.2
- The same changes to the interior design and to the 4WD transmission system as happened with the JB43 model in the same time.
- Engine and front bumper remained the same until the next change described below.
2005.06-2011
3.4.3
- 86 PS (63 kW) K9K 266 engine.
- Engine's power and low-RPM torque significantly improved by the addition of an intercooler.
- Engine's reliability issues resolved with different components in the fuel injection system and with improved design of the crankshaft mechanisms.
- Fuel consumption not changed.
- New (2nd edition) front bumper, which is much deeper than the seminal 1st edition one, and therefore vehicle's approach angle is significantly compromised.
- New bumper was designed to accommodate engine's intercooler, which is positioned just above the right front fog lamp.
2005.12-2011
3.4.4
- Minor dash and air conditioner changes.
- Minor change in the logic of the 4WD control computer to automatically sequentially shift from 2WD-H through 4WD-H into 4WD-L (and vice versa).
2008.06-2011

Jimny development in the 4th generation (2018–present)

Fourth Generation Jimny
4.1
XC, 2018 – present. R06A type turbo engine.
4.1.1
- Facelifted Jimny Sierra
- Improved Ladder Frame with cross bars, increased torsional rigidty by 1.5 times, and newly designed body rubber mount.
- 3 Link rigid axle type suspension.
- Brake LSD traction control.
- Infotainment system (can be removed) with multi-information display.
- Suzuki Safety Support. (Road Sign Assist, Dual Sensor Braking Support, Lane Departure Alert, Weaving Alert, High Beam Assist, Advanced Car Launch Notification Function and False Suppression Function.)
2018 – present
4.1.2
- Long-wheelbase 5-door Jimny
- The same engine and gearbox options as the short-wheelbase 3-door edition.
- The only differences between the 3-door and 5-door editions are two extra side doors, as well as a longer boot / trunk.
2023 – present

== Sales ==
Year	Japan	Europe	Indonesia	Vietnam
1998		4,171		
1999		19,431		
2000		21,351		
2001	16,780	19,865		
2002	14,885	21,541		
2003	13,803	21,182		
2004	13,732	26,674		
2005	14,715	27,007		
2006	16,472	28,388		
2007	15,465	27,783		
2008	14,948	21,880		
2009	11,222	20,681		
2010	11,444	17,473		
2011	12,958	12,923		
2012	14,733	12,467		
2013	15,590	10,713		
2014	14,593	10,787		
2015	12,973	12,271		
2016	13,267	13,184		
2017	12,487	14,710		
2018	20,942	10,438		
2019	30,281	16,605	546	
2020	38,056	10,063	977	
2021	39,422	563	795	
2022	41,405	459	1,168	
2023	39,910		812	1
2024	41,405	—N/a	2,445	437
2025	50,362	—N/a	1,855	
