= Press Your Luck (disambiguation) =

Press Your Luck is an American television game show.

Press Your Luck may also refer to:

- International versions of Press Your Luck
- Press Your Luck scandal
- Whammy! Push Your Luck
- Whammy! The All-New Press Your Luck

== See also ==
- The Luckiest Man in America
