= International versions of Press Your Luck =

Press Your Luck is an international television game show franchise of American origin.

== International versions ==
| Country | Local name | Host | Channel | Date aired |
|---|---|---|---|---|
| Australia | Press Your Luck | Ian Turpie | Seven Network | 1987–88 |
| Chile | Concurso de Cola Cao (Segment on Sábado Gigante) | Don Francisco | Canal 13 | 1986–87 |
| Germany | Glück am Drücker | Al Munteanu | RTLplus | March 30 – August 29, 1992 |
| Germany | Drück Dein Glück | Guido Kellerman | RTL II | 1999 |
| Philippines | Whammy! Push Your Luck | Paolo Bediones; Rufa Mae Quinto | GMA Network | October 8, 2007 – February 29, 2008 |
| Taiwan | 強棒出擊 (Segment on Slugger Attack) | Ba Ge (巴戈); Yáng Hǎiwéi (楊海薇) | Taiwan Television | January 1, 1985 – September 15, 1995 |
| Turkey | Şansını Dene | Oktay Kaynarca | Kanal D | 1994–96 |
| United Kingdom | Press Your Luck | Paul Coia | HTV West | June 6, 1991 – September 20, 1992 |
| United States (original format) | Press Your Luck | Peter Tomarken | CBS | September 19, 1983 – September 26, 1986 |
| United States (original format) | Press Your Luck | Elizabeth Banks | ABC | June 12, 2019 – present |
| United States (original format) | Whammy! The All-New Press Your Luck | Todd Newton | Game Show Network | April 15, 2002 – December 5, 2003 |

Australia

The series was presented by Ian Turpie with John Deeks as announcer on Seven Network from 1987 to 1988. Grundy Worldwide packaged this version, with Bill Mason as executive producer. This version used the same Whammy animations as the original, as well as a similar set (a Grundy tradition); however, the Big Board used considerably lower dollar values. Prior to this, there was an Australian version of Second Chance that aired in 1977 on Network Ten hosted by Earle Bailey and Christine Broadway and also produced by Grundy.

Germany

A German version entitled Glück am Drücker ("Good Luck on the Trigger") aired on RTLplus in 1992 with Al Munteanu as host. It had an animated vulture named "Raffi" steal cash and prizes from contestants instead of Whammies.

Another remake, Drück Dein Glück ("Push Your Luck"), aired daily in 1999 on RTL II with Guido Kellerman as host. And just like Glück am Drücker, instead of Whammies, a shark named Hainz der Geldhai ("Hainz the Money Shark") "ate" the contestant's money. This version also had a unique rule where landing a car won the game automatically, regardless of the scores.

Philippines

GMA Network aired a version called Whammy! Push Your Luck based on the short-lived 2002–03 GSN remake called Whammy! The All-New Press Your Luck from 2007 to 2008 hosted by Paolo Bediones and Rufa Mae Quinto. The program used the same (redubbed) Whammy animations as the 2000s updated American version.

Taiwan

A Taiwanese variety show called Slugger Attack aired a segment based on this game on Taiwan Television from 1985 to 1995. It used a naughty ghost instead of animated whammies.

Turkey

A Turkish version of PYL called Şansını Dene ("Try Your Luck") aired on Kanal D from 1994 to 1996, hosted by Oktay Kaynarca. It used the same Whammy animations, music and sound effects as the original.

United Kingdom

An ITV version ran for two seasons from June 6, 1991, to September 20, 1992, on ITV in the HTV West region, with Paul Coia as host. The series was made on a small budget, using a point-based scoring system with the day's winner receiving £200. This eliminated much of the excitement present in other versions, and declining ratings led to a switch from prime time to Saturday afternoons during the first season. When the show's second season premiered in 1992, it was moved to Sunday afternoons. The show was canceled following the second season due to budget cuts that resulted from the ITV franchise auctions of 1991, as well as lower ratings figures.

== See also ==
- List of television game show franchises
