= Behind the Camera =

Behind the Camera may refer to:

- Behind the Camera: The Cinematographer's Art, a 1971 book by Leonard Maltin
- Behind the Camera: The Unauthorized Story of Three's Company, a 2003 television docudrama
- Behind the Camera: The Unauthorized Story of Charlie's Angels, a 2004 television docudrama
