= Leonard Maltin =

American film critic and film historian (born 1950)

- Maltin at the Telluride Film Festival in 2025
- Born: Leonard Michael Maltin; December 18, 1950 (age 75); New York City, U.S.
- Education: New York University
- Occupations: Film critic; film historian; animation historian; food critic
- Years active: 1965–present
- Spouse: Alice Tlusty (m. 1975)
- Children: 1
- Awards: June Foray Award (2002); Inkpot Award (2013); Robert Osborne Award (2022)
- Website: leonardmaltin.com

Leonard Michael Maltin (born December 18, 1950) is an American film critic, film historian, and author. He is known for his book of film capsule reviews, Leonard Maltin's Movie Guide, published from 1969 to 2014. Maltin was the film critic on Entertainment Tonight from 1982 to 2012. Since 1998, he has taught film as a professor at the USC School of Cinematic Arts. In 2014, he began the weekly podcast Maltin on Movies. He served two terms as President of the Los Angeles Film Critics Association, and votes for films to be selected for the National Film Registry.

He has written books on animation and the history of film. He has also hosted numerous specials and provided commentary for several films. In 2021, he released his memoir, Starstruck: My Unlikely Road to Hollywood. He received the Robert Osborne Award from Turner Classic Movies in 2022.

== Early life and education ==
Maltin was born into a Jewish family in New York City, the son of Jacqueline (née Gould; 1923–2012) and Aaron Isaac Maltin (1915–2002). His mother was a singer and his father was a lawyer and immigration judge. He was raised in Teaneck, New Jersey.

Maltin was inspired to become a film writer by John McCabe's biography Mr. Laurel and Mr. Hardy. "It changed my life", he said. He told the LA Times that he had checked the book out of the library repeatedly when he was a child. "It helped steer me on the path toward my lifelong love of film history", he said in an obituary of biographer McCabe in 2005.

Maltin began his writing career at age 10, with a weekly magazine called The Bergen Bulletin. At 13, he started writing for the Pennsylvania-based 8mm Collector, with a column called Research Unlimited, where he answered film questions. He began writing a monthly column for a Canadian publication, Film Fan Monthly, edited by Daryl Davy, dedicated to films from the golden age of Hollywood. In May 1966, Davy asked 15-year-old Maltin if he would take over as editor and sold the publication to him for $175. At the time it had a circulation of 400 in 11 countries. He expanded the circulation to 2,000 and continued to publish it until 1974. In the December 1968 issue of Esquire magazine, he wrote an article listing his 75 best movies shown on television and the 25 worst. He also wrote for Classic Images.

Martin created a film society at Teaneck High School and graduated in 1968, later earning a journalism degree at New York University.

== Career ==
=== Early writings ===
While at New York University, Maltin became film critic and associate editor for the university's Washington Square Journal, as well as continuing to edit Film Fan Monthly. An English teacher at Teaneck High School suggested that Maltin meet a friend of hers at publisher New American Library who was looking for someone to edit a film guide and in September 1969, at age 18, Maltin edited his first book, TV Movies, a compendium of synopses and reviews, with the subtitle, "Everything You Want To Know About More than 8,000 Movies Now Being Shown on TV". In subsequent years, the book was regularly updated and then annually updated from October 1987 until September 2014, each edition having the following year's date. The book was later known as Leonard Maltin's TV Movies and Video Guide and eventually Leonard Maltin's Movie Guide. In 2005, many films released no later than 1960 were moved into a spin-off volume, Leonard Maltin's Classic Movie Guide, to allow the regular book to cover a larger number of more recent titles.

In 1970, his second book, Movie Comedy Teams, was published featuring teams such as Laurel and Hardy, the Marx Brothers and Abbott and Costello. Maltin wrote program guides for the newly created Showtime network and went on to publish articles in a variety of film journals, newspapers, and magazines, including Variety and TV Guide. In the 1970s Maltin also reviewed recordings in the jazz magazine Downbeat. Maltin served as the film critic for Playboy for six years based on Roger Ebert's suggestion. He also wrote Behind the Camera, a study of cinematography published in 1971.

=== 1982–2012: Entertainment Tonight ===
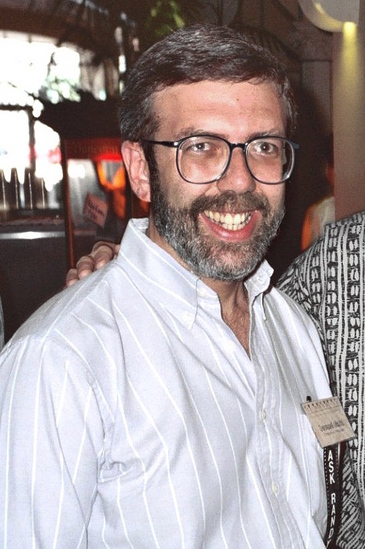
Maltin in 1990

Starting on May 29, 1982, Maltin was the film reviewer on the syndicated television series Entertainment Tonight for 30 years. He praised the Tournee of Animation (alongside the Los Angeles International Animation Celebration) on the show at one point or another. He also appeared on the Starz cable network, and hosted his own syndicated radio program, Leonard Maltin on Video, as well as the syndicated TV show Hot Ticket with Boston film critic Joyce Kulhawik (originally E! personality and game show host Todd Newton). Maltin also hosted a television show called Secret's Out on ReelzChannel network. He also spearheaded the creation of the Walt Disney Treasures collectible DVD line in 2001, and continued to provide creative input and host the various sets.

During the 1980s and 1990s, Maltin served on the advisory board of the National Student Film Institute. In the mid-1990s, Maltin became the president of the Los Angeles Film Critics Association and is on the advisory board of the Hollywood Entertainment Museum. For nearly a decade, Maltin was also on the faculty of the New School for Social Research in New York City. As of 2018, Maltin teaches in the School of Cinematic Arts at the University of Southern California. In 1990, he took a look at the MGM years of The Three Stooges in a film called The Lost Stooges, available on a made-to-order DVD through the Warner Archive Collection. Maltin left Entertainment Tonight in 2010. His final appearance on the show as a regular correspondent was on July 19, 2010. However he appeared on Entertainment Tonight having lunch with the Oscar nominees in 2012.

He also wrote the introduction for The Complete Peanuts: 1983–1984. In 1985, he delivered a three-word movie review on Entertainment Tonight for that year's horror film spoof, Transylvania 6-5000. The review begins with a silent Maltin swaying to a recording of the Glenn Miller Orchestra playing "Pennsylvania 6-5000", the instrumental melody interrupted by the sound of a telephone ringing (part of the original recording), after which the band chants the title of the song. In his review, Maltin timed it so that his review began with the phone ringing: "Transylvania 6-5000 ... stinks!"

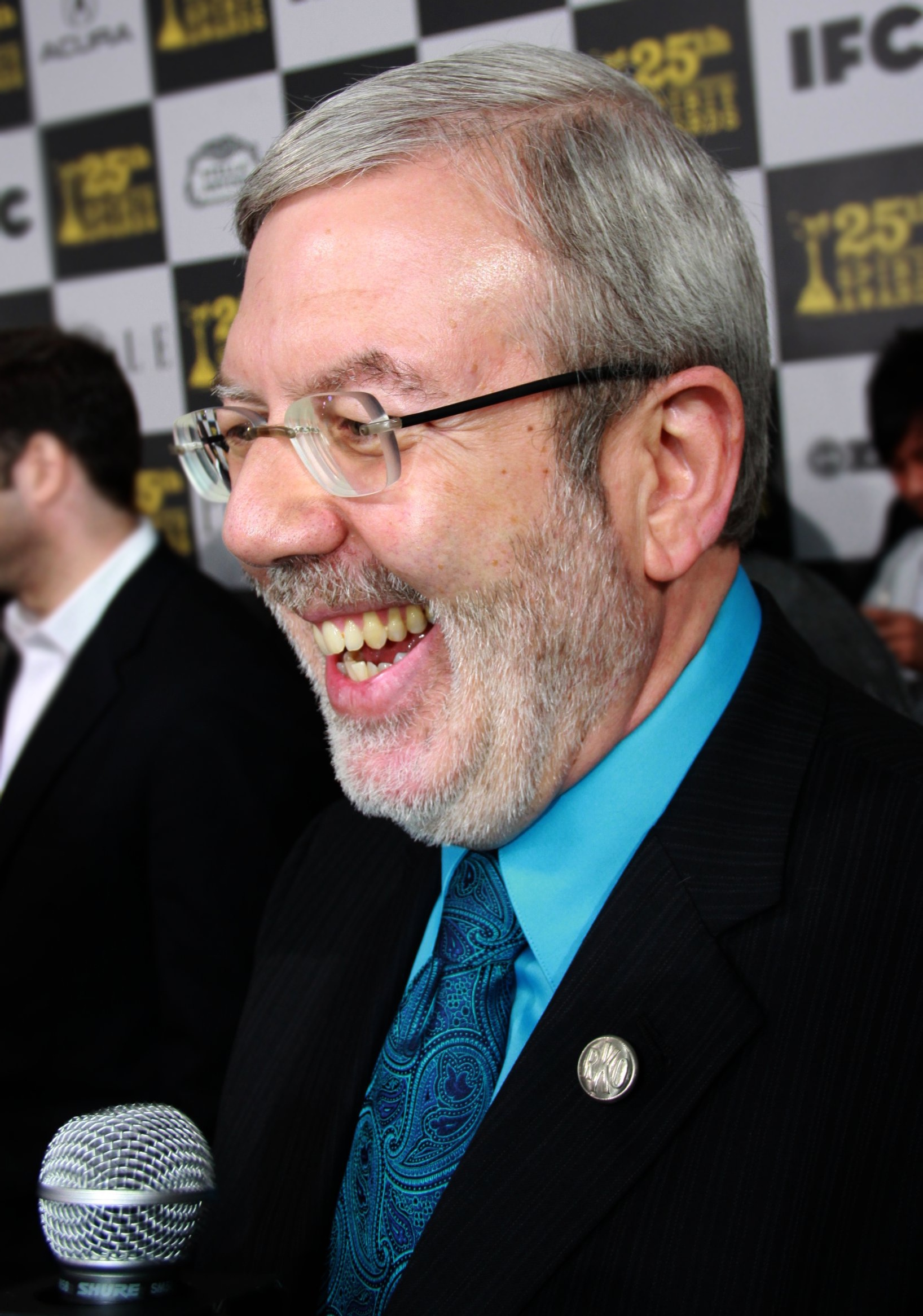
Maltin at the 2010 Independent Spirit Awards

Maltin appeared on a week of episodes of The $25,000 Pyramid (1987) as a celebrity contestant alongside Abby Dalton. Additionally, Maltin also appeared in Gremlins 2: The New Batch (1990), playing a film critic who blasts the first Gremlins film and is attacked by gremlins. This scene echoed real life, as Maltin gave the first film a bad review, finding it mean-spirited, which affected his friendship with director Joe Dante. The scene was spoofed in the Mad magazine parody of Gremlins 2, in which he protests being eaten as Roger Ebert gives a worse review of the film, only for the gremlins to remark they are waiting until Thanksgiving to find Ebert, as "he will feed a family of 15!". Maltin was parodied in the South Park episode "Mecha-Streisand" (1998) where he, Sidney Poitier, and Robert Smith fight a Godzilla-like robot version of Barbra Streisand.

Maltin voiced himself in the Freakazoid! episode "Island of Dr. Mystico", in which the titular villain, Dr. Mystico, abducted him to make use of his film knowledge. Maltin was one of the few people to appear as a "guest star" on Mystery Science Theater 3000 during its original run; during a Season Nine episode, he joins Pearl Forrester in torturing Mike Nelson and the bots with the film Gorgo. He was also mocked on the show for giving the film Laserblast a rating of 2.5 stars. After Mike and the Bots finish watching the movie, they express amazement at the rating while Mike reads off a list of well-known films that Maltin gave similar ratings to. Maltin hosted a compilation of National Film Board of Canada animated shorts, Leonard Maltin's Animation Favorites from the National Film Board of Canada.

=== 2011–present ===
Comedian Doug Benson's podcast Doug Loves Movies features a segment called the Leonard Maltin Game, in which the guest must guess the name of a film based on a subset of the cast list in reverse order and a few intentionally vague clues from the capsule review of the film from Leonard Maltin's Movie Guide. Maltin appeared on the podcast in February 2010 and played the game himself. He appeared on the show again in August 2010. In November 2010, Benson and Maltin played the game on Kevin Pollak's Chat Show. Maltin repeated his appearances on Doug Loves Movies in September 2011 with Jimmy Pardo and Samm Levine, in September 2012 with Chris Evans and Adam Scott and in November 2013 with Peter Segal, "Werner Herzog" and Clare Kramer.

Beginning in November 2014, Maltin has hosted the podcast Maltin on Movies. It began on Paul Scheer's now-defunct Wolfpop network, with comedian and actor Baron Vaughn as a co-host. The two would select a topic generally based on what was currently in theaters then discuss three other movies within that topic: one that the two both liked, one that the two disliked, and one they thought was a great lesser-known film, or "sleeper", within the category. Topics included biopics, breakthrough performances and sequels. Maltin co-hosts with his daughter Jessie Maltin.

From 2014 to September 2, 2019, Maltin hosted the quarterly Treasures From the Disney Vault on Turner Classic Movies. Beginning in 2016, Maltin has served as the Honorary Head Juror of the Coronado Island Film Festival. In 2020, the festival named their top award The Leonard Maltin Tribute Award.

In 2019, Maltin along with his daughter Jessie created a film festival called MaltinFest at the Egyptian Theater that spanned three days. Special guests included Laura Dern and Alexander Payne. Since 2018, Maltin has served on the advisory board for Legion M.

In 2022, he was invited to join the Academy of Motion Pictures Arts and Sciences as part of the Member at Large branch.

== In popular culture ==
Leonard Maltin's Movie Guide has been praised by comedian Patton Oswalt, who described it as "a paperback Kubrickian monolith of one man's massive and far-reaching tastes." Other admirers include Noah Baumbach, Alexander Payne, and Billy Bob Thornton.

In The Simpsons episode "A Star Is Burns", Marge says: "Did you know there are over 600 critics on TV and Leonard Maltin is the best-looking of them all?" Lisa replies "Ewwww!" In the 1995 video release of the original Star Wars trilogy, there was an interview with George Lucas conducted by Maltin before the start of the films. Maltin is listed in the Guinness Book of World Records for the world's shortest movie review. His two-star review of the 1948 musical Isn't It Romantic consists of the word "No", in response to the title.

In 2020, a Leonard Maltin board game was released called King of Movies: The Leonard Maltin Game.

== Personal life ==
Maltin lives in Los Angeles. He is married to researcher and producer Alice Tlusty, and has one daughter, Jessie, who works with him (his production company, JessieFilm, is named for her). In July 2018, Maltin announced that he had been diagnosed with Parkinson's disease three and a half years prior.

In 1998, Maltin settled a libel suit brought by former actor Billy Gray, whom Maltin identified in his review of the film Dusty and Sweets McGee as a real-life drug addict and dealer. The statement had appeared in print in Maltin's annual movie guide for nearly 25 years before he publicly apologized for the error.

== Awards and honors ==
- In 1997, Maltin received the Press Award from the International Cinematographers Guild.
- In 2002, Maltin was honored by ASIFA-Hollywood at the 29th Annie Awards with the June Foray Award, given to those who have "a significant and benevolent or charitable impact on the art and industry of animation."
- In 2005, Maltin was awarded the ASC Bud Stone Award of Distinction by the American Society of Cinematographers. That same year, Maltin was awarded with the Career Achievement Award at the Temecula Valley International Film Festival.
- In 2007, Maltin received the Telluride Film Festival Silver Medallion in recognition of his achievements in the film industry.
- In 2010, Maltin received the NFFC-Disneyana Fan Club Heritage Award.
- In 2010, Maltin was honored by the National Board of Review with the William K. Everson Film History Award.
- In 2013 Maltin received the Inkpot Award from Comic Con International.
- In 2018, Maltin was inducted into the Online Film & Television Association's Film Hall of Fame.
- On April 24, 2018, the Los Angeles City Council declared it Leonard Maltin Day.
- In August 2018, the California Independent Film Festival honored Maltin with the Golden Slate award for "his years of contribution to film and film history."
- In 2022, after a two-year delay caused by the COVID-19 pandemic, the TCM Film Festival honored Maltin with the Robert Osborne Award for helping "keep the cultural heritage of classic film alive for future generations." The award was presented by Warren Beatty.

== Bibliography ==
=== As author ===
- Movie Comedy Teams (NAL, 1970; revised editions, 1974, 1985)
- Behind the Camera (NAL, 1971), reissued as The Art of the Cinematographer (Dover, 1978)
- The Great Movie Shorts (Crown, 1972), reissued as Selected Short Subjects (Da Capo, 1983)
- The Disney Films (Crown, 1973; revised edition, 1985; 3rd edition, 1995 from Hyperion; 4th ed., 2000, Disney Editions)
- Carole Lombard (Pyramid, 1976)
- Our Gang: The Life and Times of the Little Rascals (Crown, 1977; coauthor with Richard W. Bann; revised and reissued as The Little Rascals: The Life and Times of Our Gang, 1992)
- The Great Movie Comedians (Crown, 1978, revised edition, 1982)
- Of Mice and Magic: A History of American Animated Cartoons (NAL and McGraw Hill, 1980; revised edition, November 1987)
- The Complete Guide to Home Video (Crown, 1981; coauthor)
- The Great American Broadcast: A Celebration of Radio's Golden Age (E.P. Dutton, 1997)
- Leonard Maltin's Movie Crazy (M Press, 2008)
- Leonard Maltin's 151 Best Movies You've Never Seen (HarperStudio, 2010)
- Hooked On Hollywood: Discoveries From A Lifetime of Film Fandom (GoodKnight Books 2018)
- Star Struck: My Unlikely Road to Hollywood (GoodKnight Books, 2021)

=== As editor ===
- Leonard Maltin's Movie Guide (originally published as TV Movies, then Leonard Maltin's Movie & Video Guide) (NAL, 1969, 1974, 1978, 1980, 1982, 1984, 1986, 1987, published annually 1988 through 2014). Also published in a Dutch edition as Speelfilm Encyclopedie, and Swedish version as Bonniers Stora Film & Video Guide.
- The Real Stars (Curtis, 1973)
- The Real Stars #2 (Curtis, 1974)
- The Laurel & Hardy Book (Curtis, 1973)
- Hollywood: The Movie Factory (Popular Library, 1976)
- Hollywood Kids (Popular Library, 1978)
- The Real Stars #3 (Curtis, 1979)
- The Whole Film Sourcebook (NAL and Universe Books, 1983)
- Leonard Maltin's Movie Encyclopedia (Dutton/Penguin, 1994)
- Leonard Maltin's Family Movie Guide (Dutton/Signet, 1999)

=== As a host ===
- Bugs & Daffy: The Wartime Cartoons VHS, 1989, MGM/UA Home Video
- The Little Rascals only on VHS tapes, Volumes 1–21 from Cabin Fever Entertainment not on DVD from Genius Products.
- Walt Disney Treasures DVD series, featuring Disney animation and television shows.
- Fathom Events Fathom's Big Screen Classics, sharing intro information about classic movies.
