= Joyce Kulhawik =

American critic and TV journalist

- Born: 1954 (age 71–72); Connecticut, U.S.
- Education: Simmons College (B.A., 1974); University of Vermont (M.A., 1977)
- Occupation: TV journalist
- Spouse: Andrew Cohen (m. 1979)
- Children: 1
- Website: joyceschoices.com

Joyce Kulhawik (/kəlˈheɪwɪk/ kəl-HAY-wik; born 1954) is an American critic who was the arts and entertainment anchor for CBS affiliate WBZ-TV News in Boston, Massachusetts.

== Early life ==
Kulhawik received her bachelor of arts degree in English and Secondary Education from Simmons College in 1974. One of the top two graduating seniors at Simmons, Kulhawik received the Crown Zellerbach Award and a full fellowship from the University of Vermont, where she received a double master's degree in English/Education in 1977. She taught English at Brookline High School from 1976 through 1978, and at the Boston Architectural Center from 1977 through 1979.

== Career ==
Kulhawik joined WBZ-TV in 1978 as an associate producer and tipster for Evening Magazine. In 1981 she became the station's arts and entertainment reporter and played a key role in the public service campaign, “You Gotta Have Arts!” As part of the campaign, Kulhawik hosted the station's Emmy Award-winning “You Gotta Have Arts!” magazine program during its one-year run, as well as three specials, the first of which received an Emmy Award in 1982.

She also presented Arts Breaks, 60-second spots featuring local artists, museums, and cultural events. From 1982 through 1985 Kulhawik served as co-anchor of the station's Live on 4 newscast. She remained with WBZ until May 2008.

Kulhawik was co-host of the weekly nationally syndicated movie review program, Hot Ticket, with veteran movie critic Leonard Maltin and during the first season, E! reporter Todd Newton.

During the 1999–2000 television season, she was a recurring co-host on Roger Ebert & The Movies. She was one of three finalists, along with Michaela Pereira and Richard Roeper, to become Ebert's permanent co-host; the role ultimately went to Roeper.

Kulhawik performs as a guest narrator in orchestral works, and has performed with The Boston Pops (Keith Lockhart conducting), The New England Philharmonic (Richard Pittman conducting), The Boston Musica Viva (Richard Pittman conducting), The Boston Civic Symphony (Max Hobart conducting), and the Concord Orchestra (Richard Pittman conducting).

She currently reviews movies and theater online on her website.

== Personal life ==
Kulhawik married Andrew Cohen in 1979. They reside in Wayland, Massachusetts, with their daughter, Annelise.

Kulhawik plays the piano, has sung professionally and can yodel. She was the soloist and organist for seven years at her parish church in her home state of Connecticut.

=== Cancer ===
A three-time cancer survivor (ovarian cancer twice, and melanoma), Kulhawik was called upon to testify before Congress on the occasion of the 20th anniversary of The National Cancer Act. Since 1983 she has served as the Honorary Chairperson for the American Cancer Society (ACS)'s Daffodil Days, the largest statewide annual spring fundraising event.

== Awards ==
The American Cancer Society honored Kulhawik with its National Bronze Medal Award. Kulhawik accepted the 1994 Gilda Radner Award from the Wellness Community in Greater Boston "for engendering inspiration in cancer patients via her own valiant fight with the disease."

Kulhawik is a member of the Boston Society of Film Critics and serves on the selection committee for The Boston Theater Awards. In 1994 the Berklee College of Music honored Kulhawik for her many contributions to the Boston arts community by establishing a $25,000 newly endowed scholarship in her name, in perpetuity. In 1995 the Lyric Stage Company honored Kulhawik with their Arts Support Award.

In 1990 she was the recipient of The Boston Theater District Award, which is presented annually to a Bostonian who has made a significant contribution to the stage, screen, and/or television.

In May 2002, Kulhawik received an Honorary Doctorate in Communications from her alma mater, Simmons College. She also received a 2001 Boston/New England Emmy Award for WBZ-TV's Outstanding Team Coverage of Ground Zero.

In May 2007, she was named one of the first inductees to the Massachusetts Broadcasters Hall of Fame.

In May 2010, at the 33rd National Academy of Television Arts and Sciences Boston/New England Emmy Awards Celebration, she received the 2010 Governor's Award. The president of NTA Boston/ New England chapter, Timothy Egan stated, "The National Television Academy's Boston New England Chapter is pleased to celebrate Joyce Kulhawik's excellence by awarding her the 2010 Governor's Award in honor of her legendary journalism and contribution to the arts. Joyce is a trailblazer for women in the business and one of New England's best known and most talented media professionals."

In May 2011, she received the Lifetime Achievement Award at the 14th annual Exceptional Woman Awards, presented by radio station 106.7FM WMJX Boston.
