= Hot Ticket =

- Presented by: Leonard Maltin; Todd Newton (2001-2002); Joyce Kulhawik (2002-2004)
- Country of origin: United States
- Original language: English

Production
- Running time: 30 mins.
- Production company: Paramount Domestic Television

Original release
- Network: Syndication
- Release: 2001 – 2004

Hot Ticket is a syndicated movie review and entertainment television program from 2001 to 2004. The half-hour show was hosted by Leonard Maltin and Todd Newton during its first season, and by Maltin and Joyce Kulhawik in seasons 2 and 3. It was distributed by Paramount Domestic Television. The show featured MTV-style fast cutting. For each movie, the hosts voted Hot or Not with red or blue cards. The show featured film reviews, showing and rating trailers, DVD recommendations, general discussions about film, and short interviews with actors about their upcoming roles.
