= Hollywood Showdown =

American game show

- Created by: Sande Stewart
- Directed by: John Vogt
- Presented by: Todd Newton
- Narrated by: Randy West
- Music by: John Nordstrom
- Country of origin: United States
- Original language: English
- No. of seasons: 2
- No. of episodes: 165

Production
- Executive producer: Sande Stewart
- Producer: Bruce Burmester
- Production locations: Sony Pictures Studios; Culver City, California
- Editor: Jon Aroesty
- Camera setup: Multi-camera
- Running time: 30 minutes
- Production companies: Sande Stewart Television; Montana Productions

Original release
- Network: PAX TV (2000); GSN (2000–2001)
- Release: January 24, 2000 – March 30, 2001

Hollywood Showdown is an American game show that aired on both PAX TV and Game Show Network (GSN) from January to June 2000, then returned solely to GSN on January 1, 2001 and ran until March 30 of that year. Reruns aired on GSN again from September 2004 to April 2005 plus June 2006 and June 2007 on TV Guide Network. Todd Newton served as host, with Randy West announcing.

The show was one of GSN's most popular shows at the time of its airing.

== Format ==
Seven (originally six) contestants competed against each other over the course of five episodes (ranging Monday through Friday), competing to answer trivia questions pertaining to the entertainment industry. One contestant was in control of the game at any given time, while the others sat in a gallery, each holding an envelope. One of the envelopes held a "Box Office" card, while the others contained cards with cash amounts ranging from $100 to $1,000 in increments of $10. Initial control of the first game on each Monday episode was determined at random.

The contestant in control selected one gallery member, who opened his/her envelope and revealed its contents. The host then read a series of toss-up questions, each with three answer choices and open for either contestant to buzz-in. A correct answer awarded one point, while a miss gave the opponent a chance to answer and steal the point. The first contestant to score three points took/retained control, while the opponent had to sit out until the beginning of the next game.

If the gallery member's card showed a dollar amount, it was added to the Box Office jackpot, which began at $10,000 for the start of each Monday episode and was reset to this value after being collected. If the gallery member had the "Box Office" card, the winner of that question round played for the jackpot.

=== Box Office ===
The object of the Box Office round was to answer five open-ended questions correctly. Before each question, the contestant was presented with two category choices. The first four correct answers were worth $500 each, and the fifth won the jackpot.

After any correct answer, the contestant could either stop playing and keep all money won to that point, or continue to the next question. An incorrect answer or failure to respond ended the round and forfeited the money. If the contestant either chose to stop or missed a question, he/she had initial control for the next game. Any contestant who won the jackpot immediately retired from the show, whereupon a new contestant was introduced and given initial control.

=== Friday Payoff ===
Each week was a self-contained competition, meaning that a game in progress on Friday could not continue into the following Monday. If a game was in progress when time ran out on Friday, all remaining gallery members opened their envelopes, and the one holding the Box Office card competed in the final question round for that week. The winner of that round could either accept $1,000 and leave the show, or return on the following Monday to play against a new group of contestants with the jackpot reset to $10,000. Early in the first season, the winner of the last Friday showdown played for the jackpot instead.

== Box Office Bonanza ==
A special "Box Office Bonanza Week" aired during the show's first season in May 2000, during which the "Box Office" card was replaced in some games by the "Blockbuster" card. When it was found, the winner of that question round played for a doubled Box Office jackpot; however, the prize returned to its original value if it was not won. On the Wednesday show of that week, a record $33,260 jackpot was won. The Friday payoff rules remained, except that the winner of the final question round was offered $2,000 to leave the show.
