= Suzuki M engine =

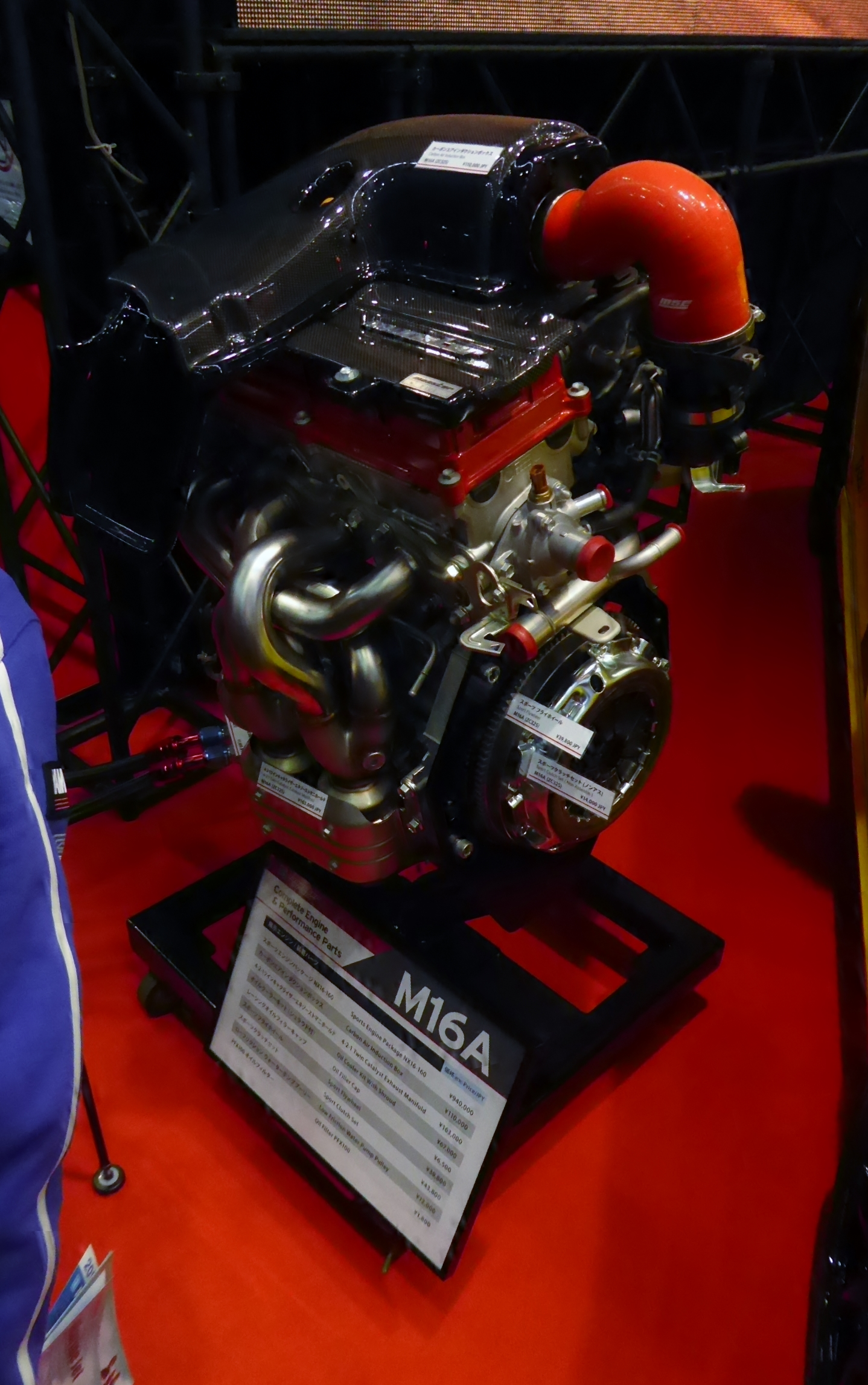

Overview
- Manufacturer: Suzuki

Layout
- Configuration: Naturally aspirated Inline-4
- Displacement: 1.3 L (1,328 cc); 1.5 L (1,490 cc); 1.6 L (1,586 cc); 1.8 L (1,796 cc)
- Cylinder bore: 78 mm (3.07 in); 83 mm (3.27 in)
- Piston stroke: 69.5 mm (2.74 in); 78 mm (3.07 in); 83 mm (3.27 in)
- Cylinder block material: Aluminum
- Cylinder head material: Aluminum
- Valvetrain: DOHC 4 valves x cyl. with VVT
- Valvetrain drive system: Timing Chain
- Compression ratio: 9.5:1, 9.6:1, 9.7:1, 10.3:1, 10.5:1, 11.0:1, 11.1:1

RPM range
- Max. engine speed: 7200 rpm

Combustion
- Fuel system: Multi-point fuel injection
- Fuel type: Gasoline
- Oil system: Wet sump
- Cooling system: Water-cooled

Output
- Power output: 83.8–134 hp (62.5–99.9 kW)
- Torque output: 110–190 N⋅m (81–140 lb⋅ft)

The Suzuki M engine family is a line of automobile engines from Suzuki. Ranging in displacement from 1.3 L to 1.8 L, it is a modern engine line with dual overhead cams, 16 valves, and multi-point fuel injection (MPFI). Fully developed in-house following Suzuki's separation from General Motors, the M engine replaced the long-lived G engine family.

== M13A ==
The M13A displaces 1.3 L (1,328 cc); bore and stroke is 78 mm × 69.5 mm (3.07 in × 2.74 in). It has a 9.5:1 compression ratio and two variants:

- with variable valve timing (VVT) valvetrain
- without VVT (Suzuki Jimny, Suzuki Ignis, Suzuki Liana) in select markets.

Automobile	Power	Torque	Notes
Jimny	85 PS (63 kW) at 6,000 rpm	110 N⋅m (81 lb⋅ft) at 4,100 rpm	
Swift	92 PS (68 kW) at 5,800 rpm	116 N⋅m (86 lb⋅ft) at 4,200 rpm	VVT

- M13A — VVT
  - Suzuki Ignis (first generation)
  - 1999–2010 Wagon R Solio 1.3
  - 2000–2018 Suzuki Jimny Wide/Sierra
  - Suzuki Swift (First generation)

== M13AA ==
The M13AA is an automotive engine manufactured by Suzuki Motor Corporation. The M13AA is a 1.3 L (1,328 cc) inline-four cylinder, 16 valve VVT engine used in the Suzuki Jimny, Suzuki Swift & Suzuki Ignis from 2005.

1.3 M13AA 1.3 L (1,328 cc) DOHC 16v MPFI VVT (Jimny)

- Bore x Stroke 78 mm × 69.5 mm (3.07 in × 2.74 in)
- Compression Ratio 9.5:1
- 85 PS (63 kW) at 6000 rpm, 110 N⋅m (81 lb⋅ft) at 4100 rpm

== M15A ==
The M15A displaces 1.5 L (1,490 cc); bore is and stroke 78 mm × 78 mm (3.07 in × 3.07 in). This engine has a variable valve timing valvetrain. With a 9.5:1 compression ratio, it produces 100 PS (74 kW) at 5,900 rpm and 133 N⋅m (98 lb⋅ft) at 4,100 rpm. The M15A used in the Suzuki Ignis (HT81S) has a higher compression ratio of 11.0:1, and produces 112 PS (82 kW) at 6400 rpm and 143 N⋅m (105 lb⋅ft) at 4100 rpm.

(Ignis)

- Compression Ratio 11.0:1
- 112 PS (82 kW) at 6400 rpm, 105 lb⋅ft (142 N⋅m) at 4100 rpm

(Swift/SX4 )

- Compression Ratio 9.5:1
- 100 PS (74 kW) at 5900 rpm, 133 N⋅m (98 lb⋅ft) at 4100 rpm

(S-Cross - Indonesian Version)

- Compression Ratio 10.3:1
- 80 kW (109 PS) at 6000 rpm, 138 N⋅m (102 lb⋅ft) at 4400 rpm

Application:

- 2001–2007 Suzuki Aerio/Liana/Baleno (North America)
- 2001–2008 Suzuki Ignis/Ignis Sport (first generation)
- 2004–2010 Suzuki Swift - 2nd generation
- 2006–2013 Suzuki SX4
- 2016–2022 Suzuki S-Cross (Indonesia)

== M16A ==
The M16A displaces 1.6 L (1,586 cc). Bore is and stroke 78 mm × 83 mm (3.07 in × 3.27 in). This engine has a DOHC variable valve timing valve train and a multipoint injection system. The engine had many iterations, depending on the car in which it was installed and the intended use of the car. The M16A engine uses a chain cam instead of a cam belt. General dimensions:

1.6L (Liana)

- 2001–2004
- compression ratio: 9.7:1
- Maximum output: 76 kW (103 PS) at 5,500 rpm
- Maximum torque: 144 N⋅m (106 lb⋅ft) at 4000 rpm

1.6L

- 2004–2007
- compression ratio:10.5:1
- Maximum output: 79 kW (107 PS) at 5,500 rpm
- Maximum torque: 144 N⋅m (106 lb⋅ft) at 4000 rpm

1.6L VVT

- compression ratio: 10.5 - 11.1:1
- Maximum output: 75–79 kW (102–107 PS) at 5,600 rpm
- Maximum torque: 145–156 N⋅m (107–115 lb⋅ft) at 4400 rpm

1.6 M16A MPFI VVT (SX4 Hatchback 2WD/4WD - Europe)

- Compression Ratio 11.0:1
- 120 PS (88 kW) at 6000 rpm
- 156 N⋅m (115 lb⋅ft) at 4400 rpm

1.6 M16A MPFI VVT (SX4 S-Cross 2wd or 4wd)

- Compression Ratio 11.0:1
- Maximum output: 100 kW (136 PS) at 6000 rpm
- Maximum torque: 156 N⋅m (115 lb⋅ft) at 4400 rpm

1.6 M16A MPFI VVT (Swift Sport 2005-2011)

- Compression Ratio 11.1:1
- 125 PS (92 kW) at 6800 rpm, 148 N⋅m (109 lb⋅ft) at 4800 rpm

1.6 M16A MPFI VVT (Swift Sport 2011 - 2014)

- Compression Ratio 11.1:1
- 100 kW (136 PS) at 6900 rpm, 160 N⋅m (118 lb⋅ft) at 4400 rpm
- Redline: 7200 rpm

1.6 M16A (fourth generation Vitara 2015+)

- Compression ratio 11.0:1
- Max power: 120 PS (88 kW) at 6,000 rpm
- Max torque: 156 N⋅m (115 lb⋅ft) at 4,400 rpm

Application:

- Suzuki SX4 S-Cross
- Suzuki Grand Vitara
- Fiat Sedici
- Suzuki Liana 109 PS (80 kW)
- Suzuki SX4 107–120 PS (79–88 kW)
- Suzuki Vitara LY
- Suzuki Swift Sport, 2nd and 3rd generations

== M18A ==
The M18A is based on the M16A, with a larger bore. It is the only M-series engine to use a different bore. It displaces 1.8 L (1,796 cc); bore and stroke is 83 mm × 83 mm (3.27 in × 3.27 in). This engine has a variable valve timing valvetrain. With a 9.6:1 compression ratio, it produces 125 PS (92 kW) at 5,500 rpm and 170 N⋅m (125 lb⋅ft) at 4,200 rpm.

Due to the engine block being based on the same casting, a M16A cylinder head can be bolted onto a M18a shortblock with minor modifications. This has been done by tuners, by installing a M18A block with the stock internals (crank, pistons and rods) in a Suzuki Swift Sport, in order to have more torque on the whole rev band.

Application:

- Suzuki Aerio (Aust. & N.Z.)
- Suzuki Liana GS 2004 (Australia & N.Z.) 125 PS (92 kW)
- 2009-2012 Suzuki SX4 (China) 131 PS (96 kW)
