= Suzuki Aerio =

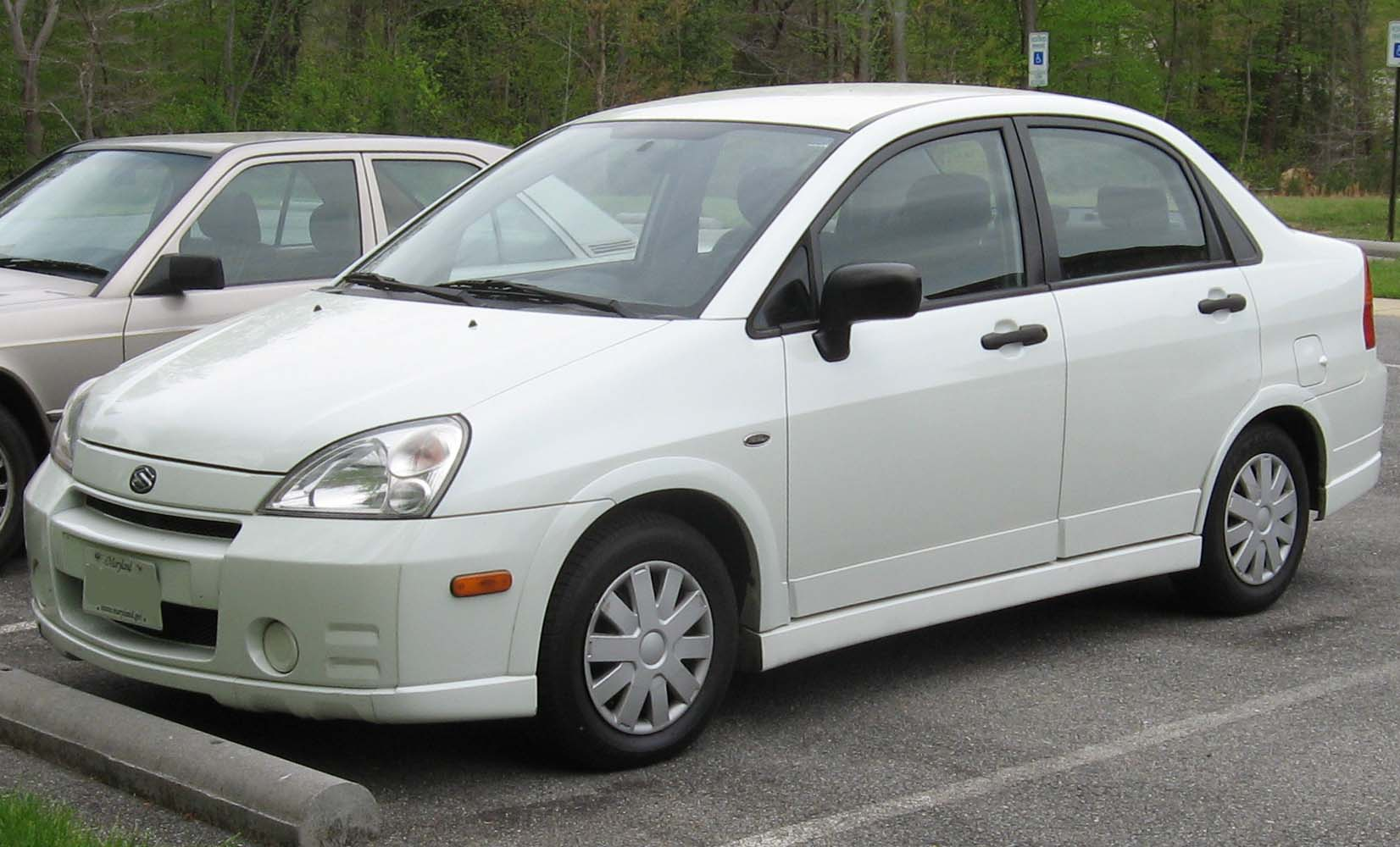
- 2002–2004 Suzuki Aerio sedan (pre-facelift, US)

Overview
- Manufacturer: Suzuki
- Model code: RA21S; RB21S; RC51S; RD51S
- Also called: Suzuki Baleno (sedan, Indonesia); Suzuki Liana
- Production: 2001–2007 (international); 2005–2019 (China); 2006–2014 (Pakistan)
- Assembly: Japan: Kosai, Shizuoka; Sagara, Shizuoka; China: Jiujiang (Changhe-Suzuki); Pakistan: Karachi (Pak Suzuki Motor); Indonesia: Bekasi (ISI)

Body and chassis
- Class: Subcompact car Mini MPV (hatchback)
- Body style: 4-door sedan 5-door hatchback
- Layout: Front-engine, front-wheel-drive / four-wheel drive

Powertrain
- Engine: 1.3 L M13A I4; 1.4 L K14B-G I4 (China); 1.5 L 4G15M I4 (China); 1.5 L M15A I4; 1.6 L M16A I4; 1.8 L M18A I4; 2.0 L J20A I4; 2.3 L J23 I4; 1.4 L DV4 I4 turbo-diesel
- Transmission: 5-speed manual 4-speed automatic

Dimensions
- Wheelbase: 2,480 mm (97.6 in)
- Length: 4,230 mm (166.5 in) (hatchback); 4,350 mm (171.3 in) (sedan)
- Width: 1,690 mm (66.5 in)
- Height: 1,550 mm (61.0 in) (hatchback); 1,535 mm (60.4 in) (sedan)

Chronology
- Predecessor: Suzuki Cultus; Suzuki Cultus Crescent (sedan/wagon)
- Successor: Suzuki SX4; Changhe A6 (China)

The Suzuki Aerio (also called the Liana – Life In A New Age – in China, Pakistan, Europe, Israel, South Asia, Taiwan and Australia or Baleno for sedan version in Indonesia) is a subcompact car that was built by Suzuki. It was introduced in 2001 as a replacement for the Suzuki Esteem/Baleno, with a tall 5-door SX model hatchback (for maximum inner room efficiency) and a 4-door sedan body. It featured two different 16-valve gasoline inline-four engines, with 1.5-litre and 1.8-litre, this one capable of 125 PS (92 kW; 123 hp) JIS. Production was discontinued in 2007 around the world and replaced by the Suzuki SX4, except in Pakistan (2006 to 2014) and China where production was continued by Changhe-Suzuki until 2019.

== Overview ==
Models in North America got a larger and more powerful 2.0-litre engine with 145 hp (108 kW). A 5-speed manual transmission was standard with a 4-speed automatic optional. All-wheel-drive was available, but only with the automatic. American Aerios came in two trim levels: the S and GS (2002–2004), S and SX (2005), and Base and Premium (2006–2007). Key changes over the years included an upgrade to a new 2.3-liter 155 hp (116 kW; 157 PS) engine in 2004, a major styling and interior refresh in 2005 (replacing the digital instruments with conventional analog ones), and the standardization of antilock brakes in 2006. Only the Aerio sedan remained for 2007, as the hatchback had been shelved to make room for the new 2007 SX4 hatchback. Likewise, the Aerio sedan bowed out at year's end, making way for the 2008 SX4 Sport sedan. Throughout its run, the Aerio was distinct for being the most affordable car in America to offer all-wheel drive.

In Europe, where the car was called Liana (an acronym for Life In A New Age), it was seen as a more affordable alternative to small family cars or to mini MPVs, introducing a new generation of Suzuki M engines, with 1.3-litre and 1.6-litre I4 engine. All-wheel drive was available on the bigger engine. In 2004, the car was restyled with a look that closer resembled the Japanese version, and also received a Diesel engine, with a 16-valve version of the 1.4-litre HDi engine supplied by PSA Peugeot Citroën, capable of 92 PS (68 kW; 91 hp) thanks to common rail direct injection and a variable geometry turbocharger.

The Liana remained in production in Pakistan in 1.3-litre and 1.6-litre variants until 2014.

== Appearances in media ==
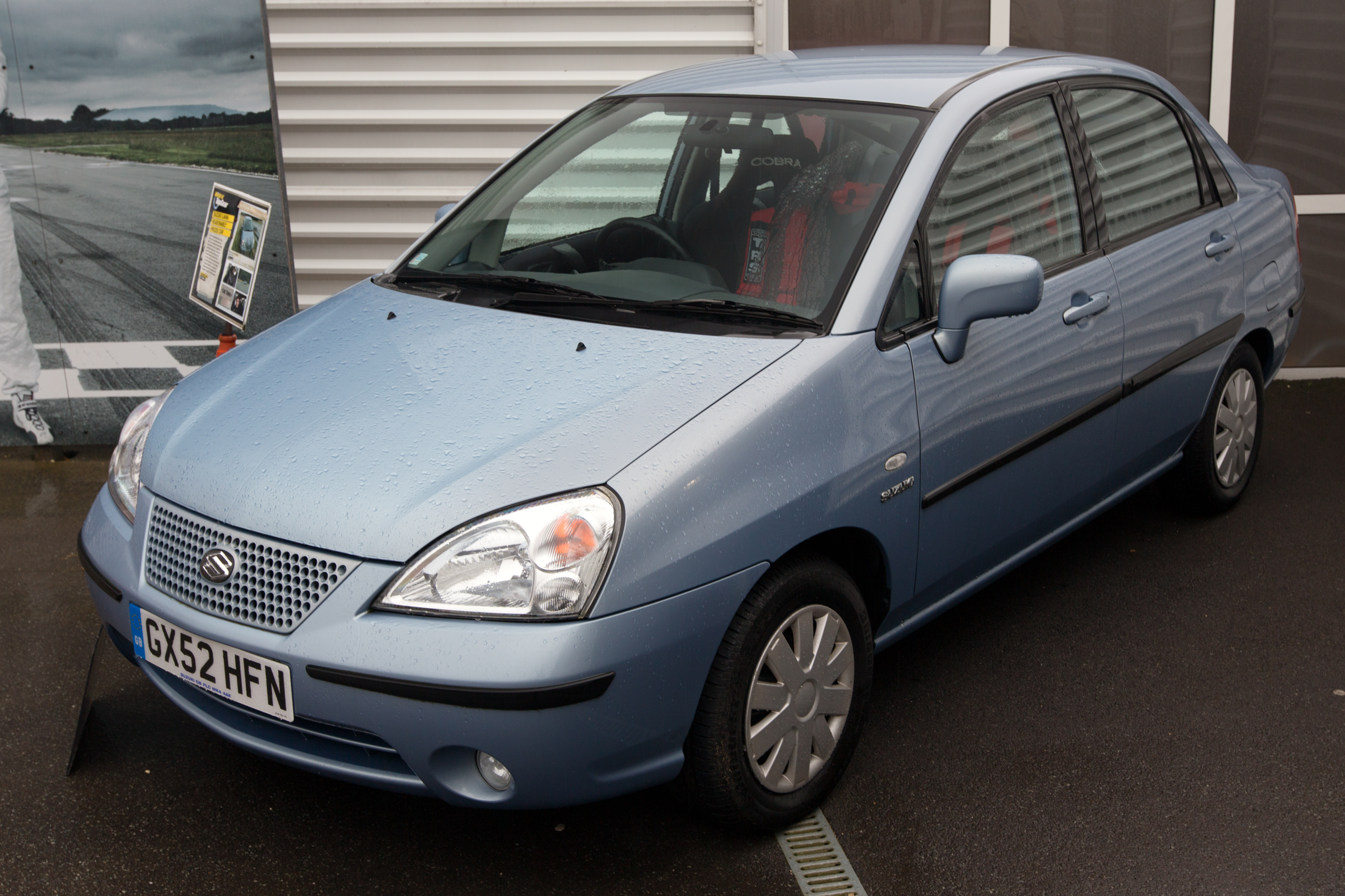
Top Gear's Suzuki Liana

The Liana was best known for its appearances as the Reasonably Priced Car in Top Gear's "Star in a Reasonably Priced Car" segment. Celebrity guests would appear on the show every week to be interviewed and to set a lap time in a saloon model Suzuki Liana. The primary car, along with spare cars, were kept stock except for a roll cage and racing seats which were added as safety measures. In its three-year tenure on Top Gear, the Liana covered 1,600 laps of the circuit; its tires and brakes were changed 100 times; and it required six new clutches, two new hubs, driveshafts, wishbones, struts and gear linkages and a replacement wing mirror. The Liana was used from its first show until its replacement by a Chevrolet Lacetti in the show's spring 2006 season. Until 2015, it enjoyed a partial retirement, and was still brought back when the guest was a Formula 1 driver.

== Pikes Peak ==
In 2001, Suzuki specially built spaceframe racing cars for hillclimb races with a bodyshell to resemble the Aerio dubbed the Suzuki Aerio P950 Pikes Peak Special driven by its rally team manager and former rally driver, Nobuhiro Tajima.

Tajima retired from the race, one mile (1.6 km) short of the finishing line suffering from mechanical failures, teammate Yutaka Awazuhara took the fourth overall in a Grand Vitara.

Tajima would finish as runner up in the All Japan Dirt Trial Championship that year with the same car and won the Race to the Sky hillclimb in 2003, before it was rebuilt as a Grand Vitara, then in 2007 as an XL7, breaking the overall course record at Pikes Peak.

== Gallery ==
=== Pre-facelift ===
==== Sedan ====
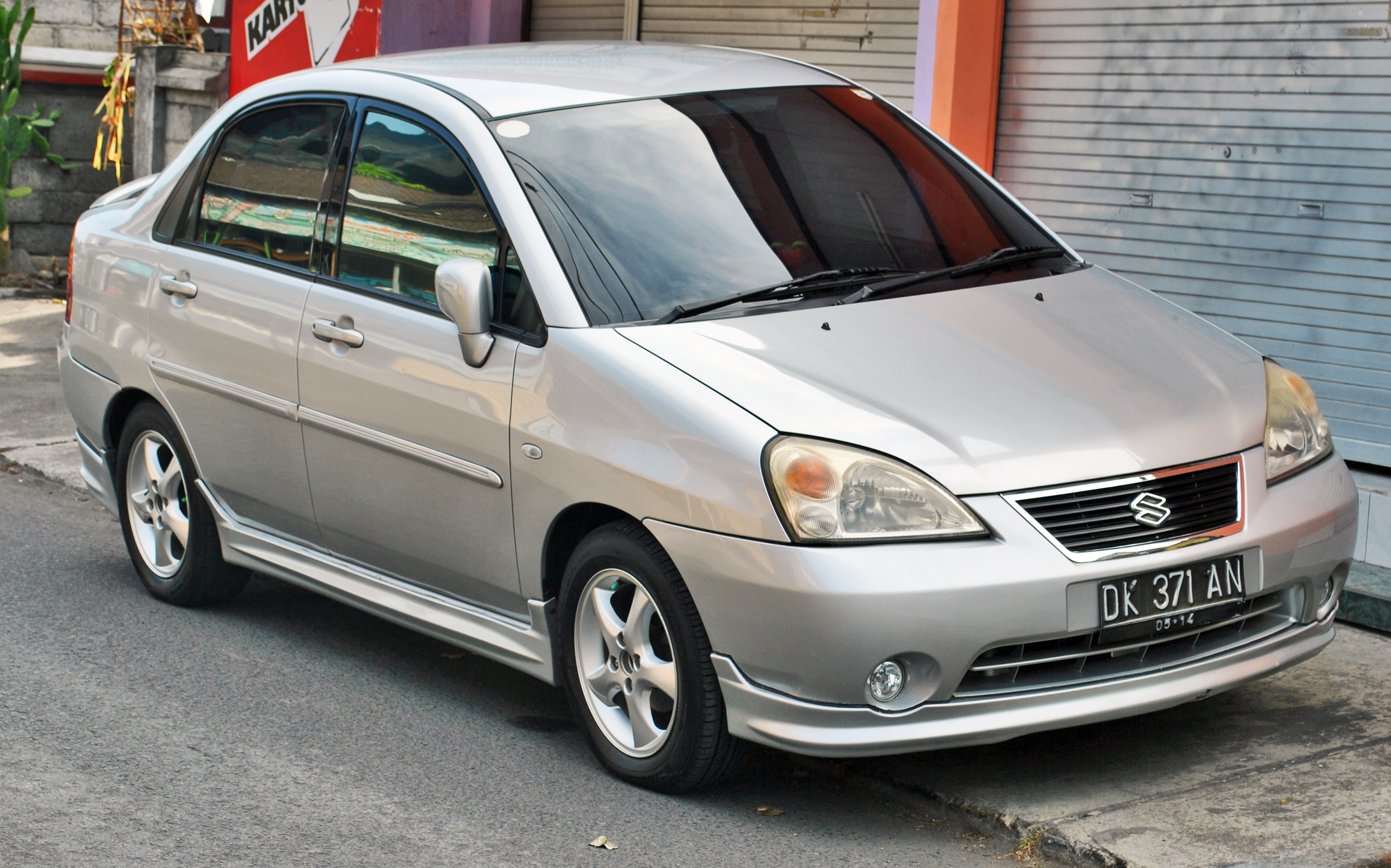
Suzuki Baleno sedan (front; Indonesia)

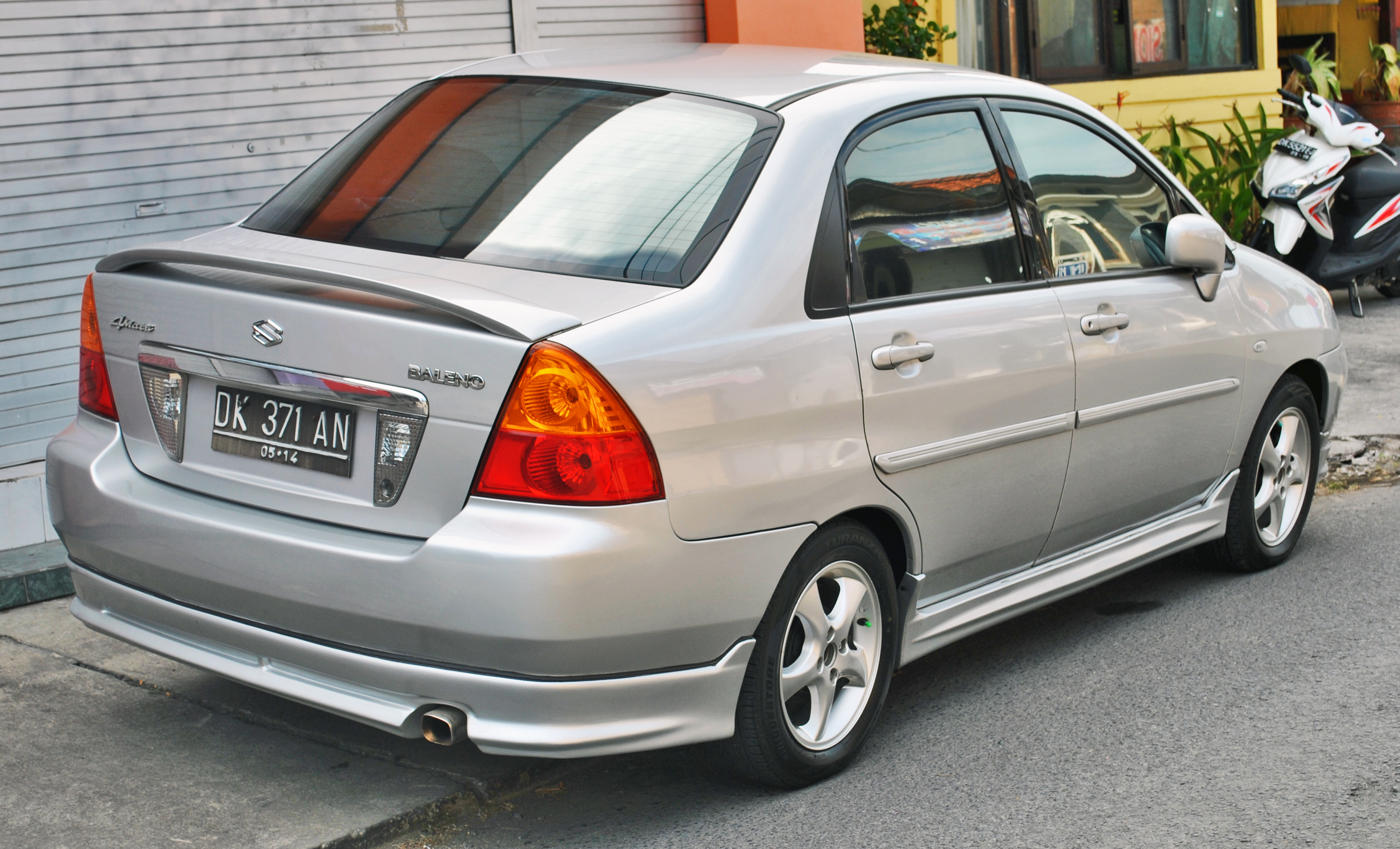
Suzuki Baleno sedan (rear; Indonesia)

==== Hatchback ====
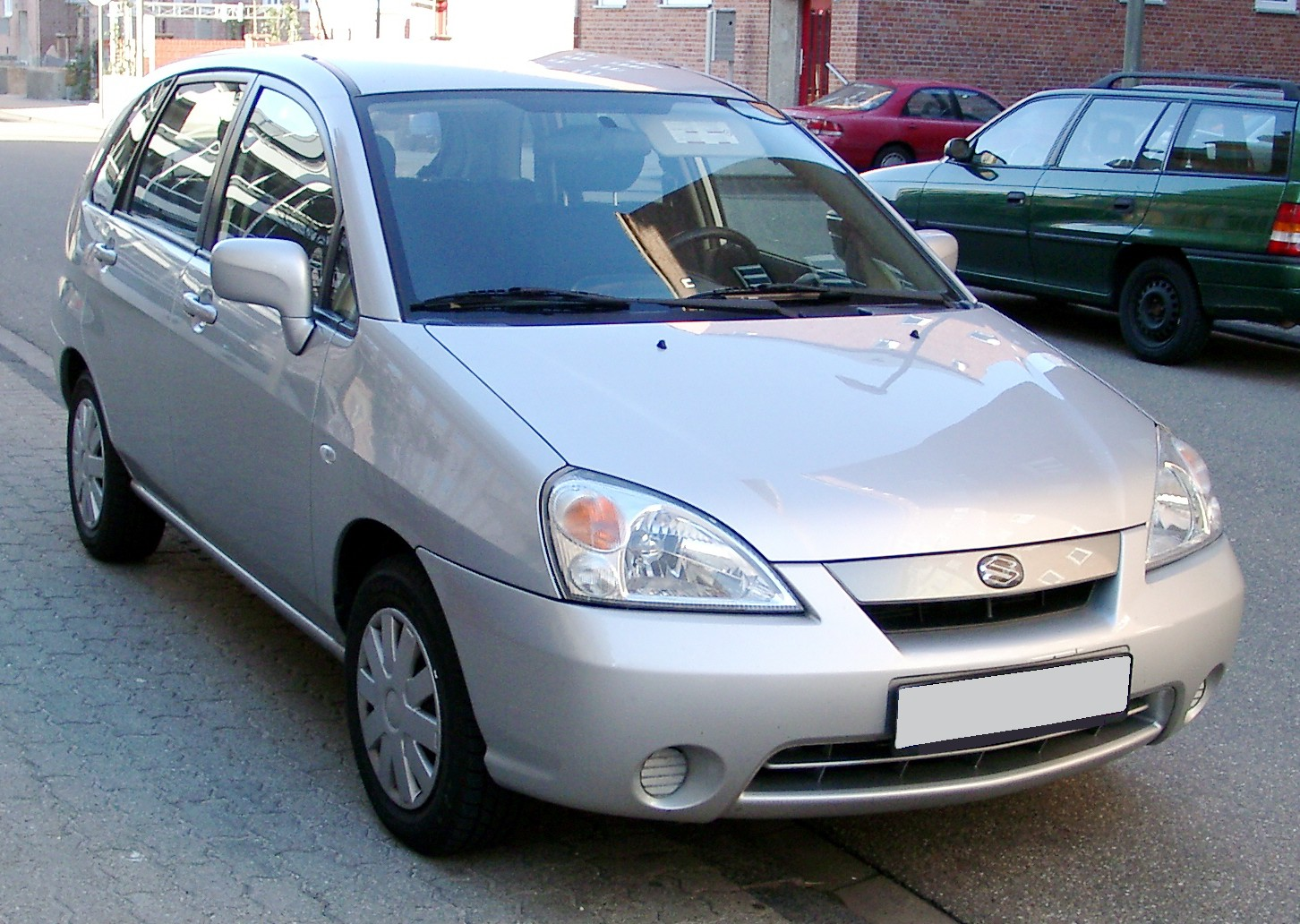
Suzuki Liana hatchback (front; Germany)

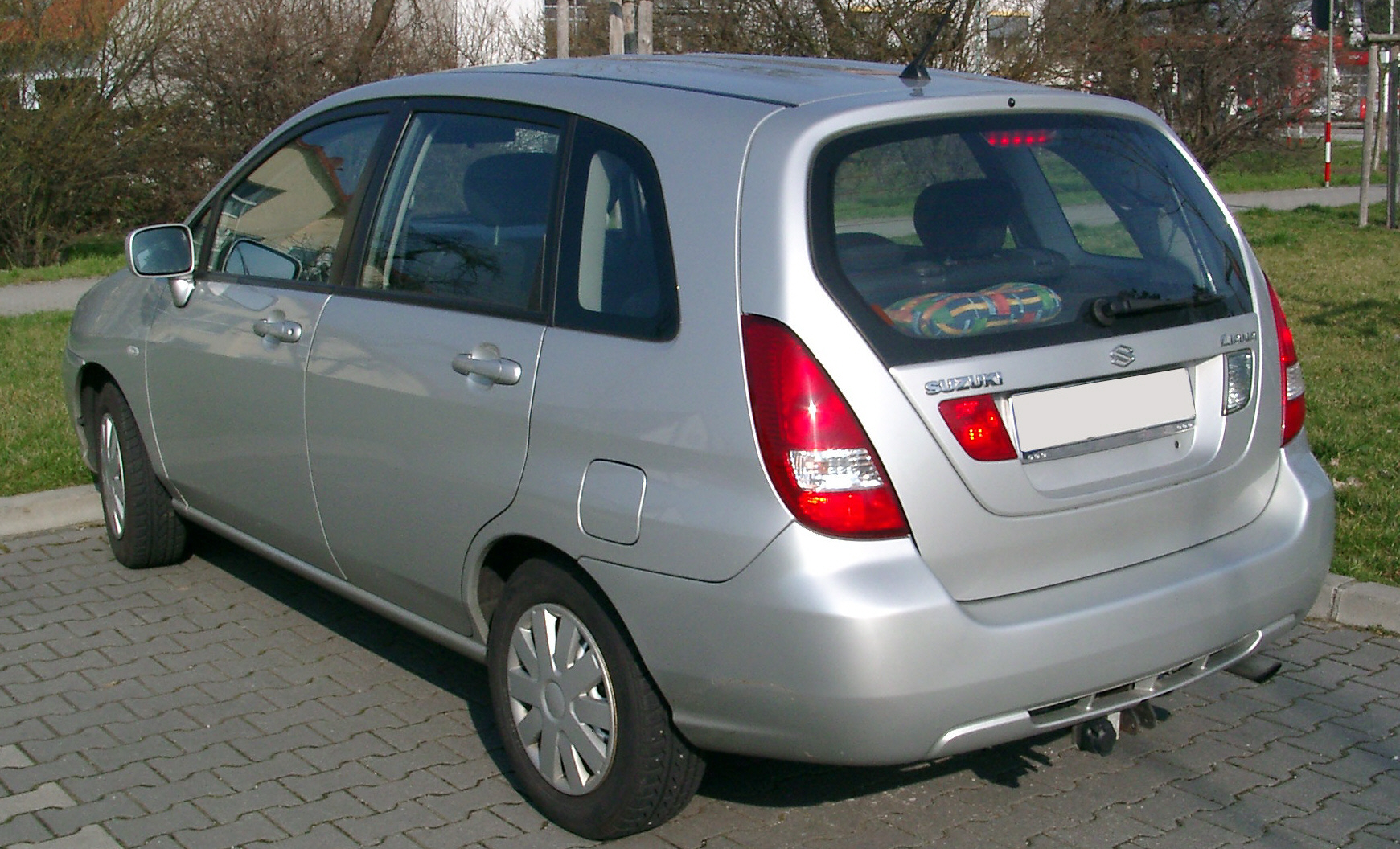
Suzuki Liana hatchback (rear; Germany)

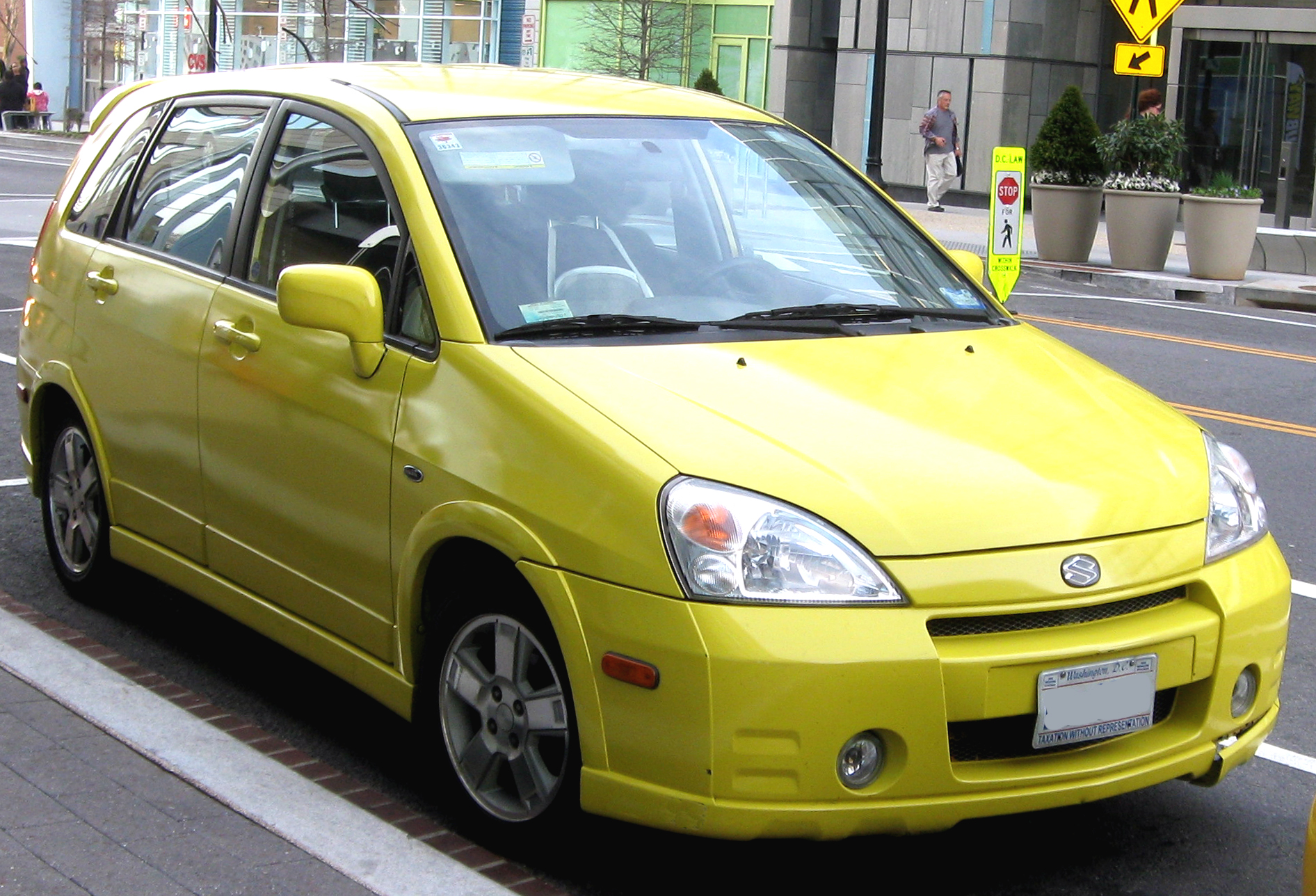
Suzuki Aerio SX (front; US)

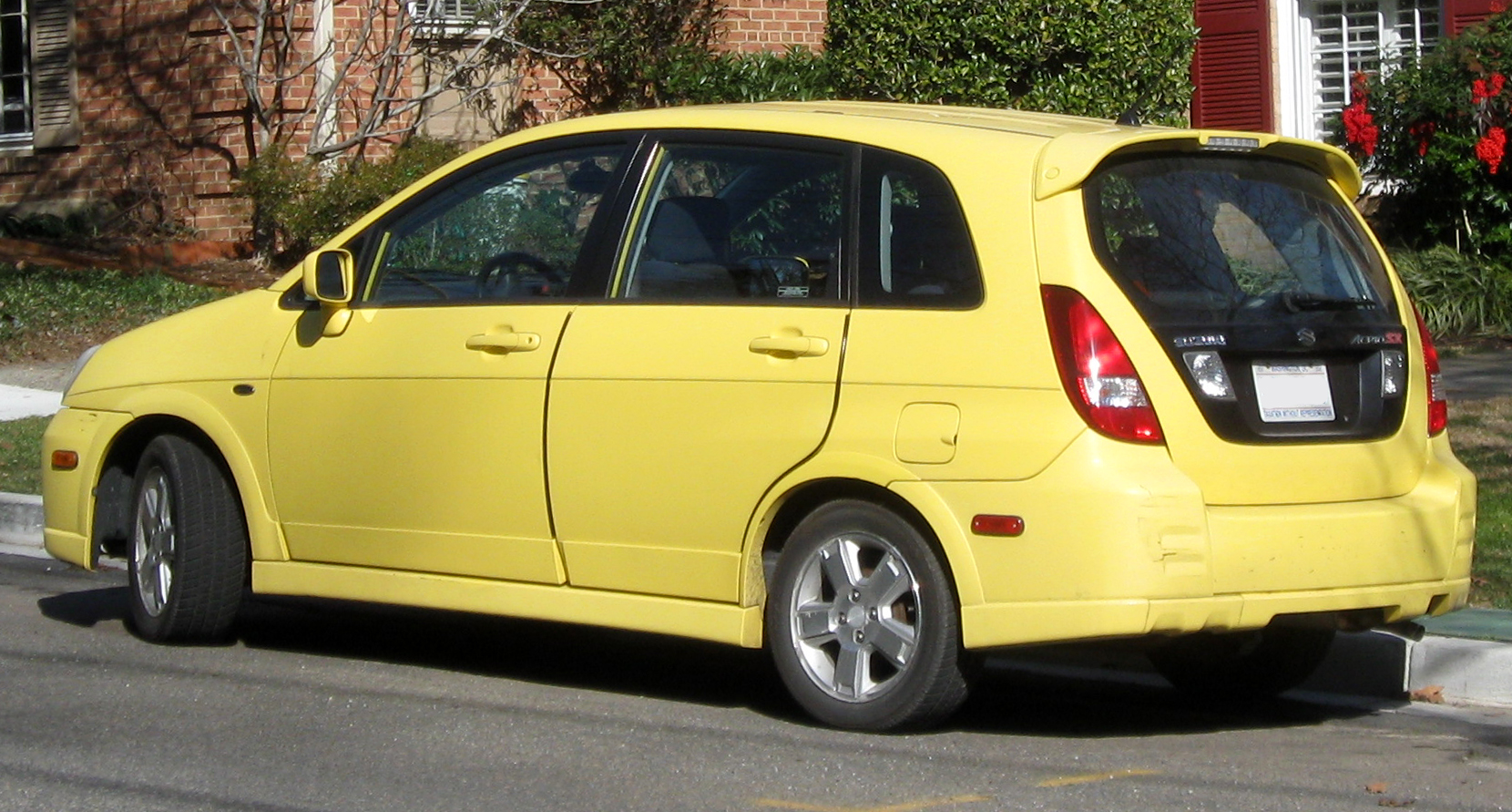
Suzuki Aerio SX (rear; US)

=== Facelift ===
==== Sedan ====
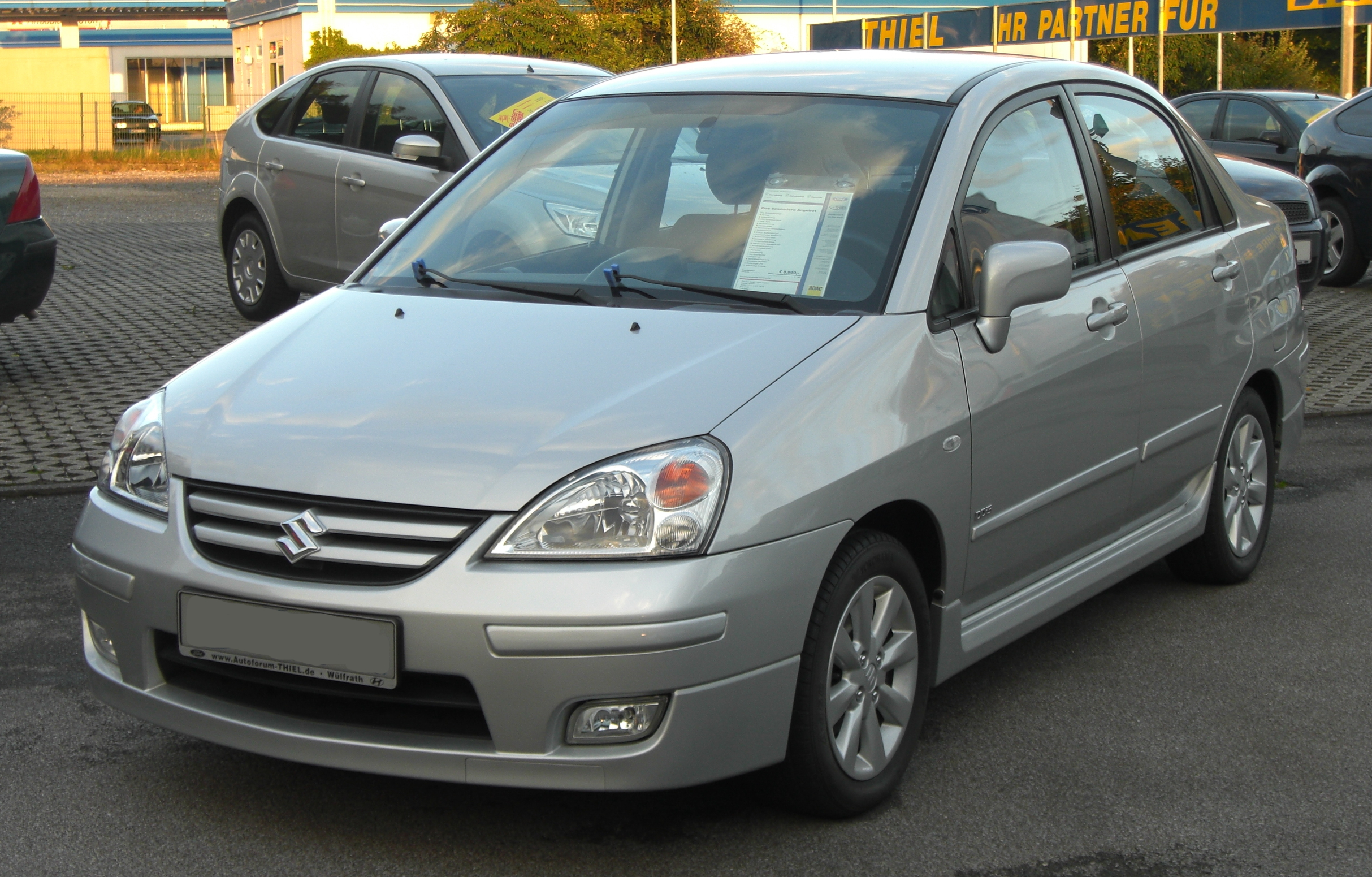
Suzuki Liana Comfort sedan (front; Germany)

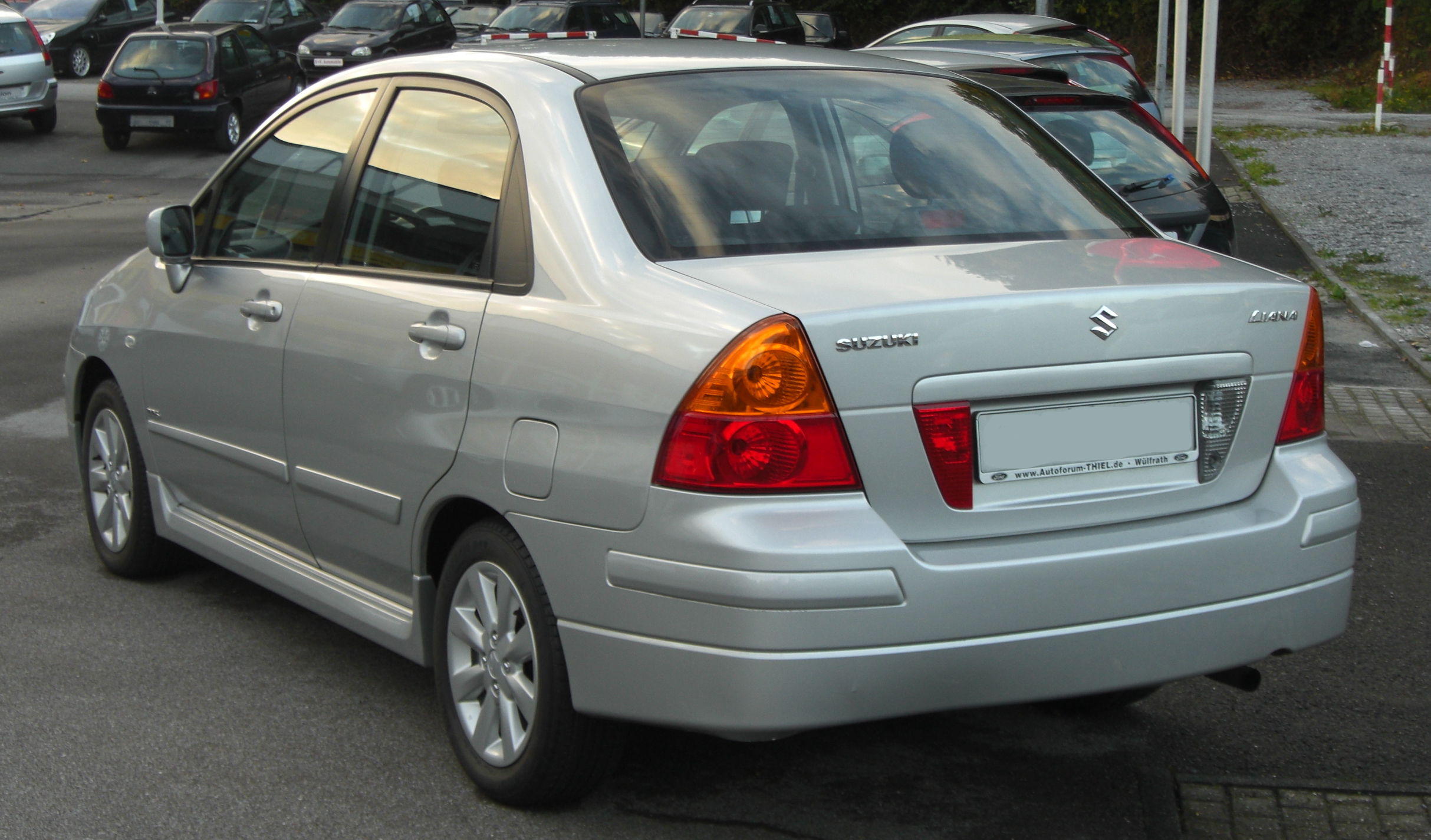
Suzuki Liana Comfort sedan (rear; Germany)

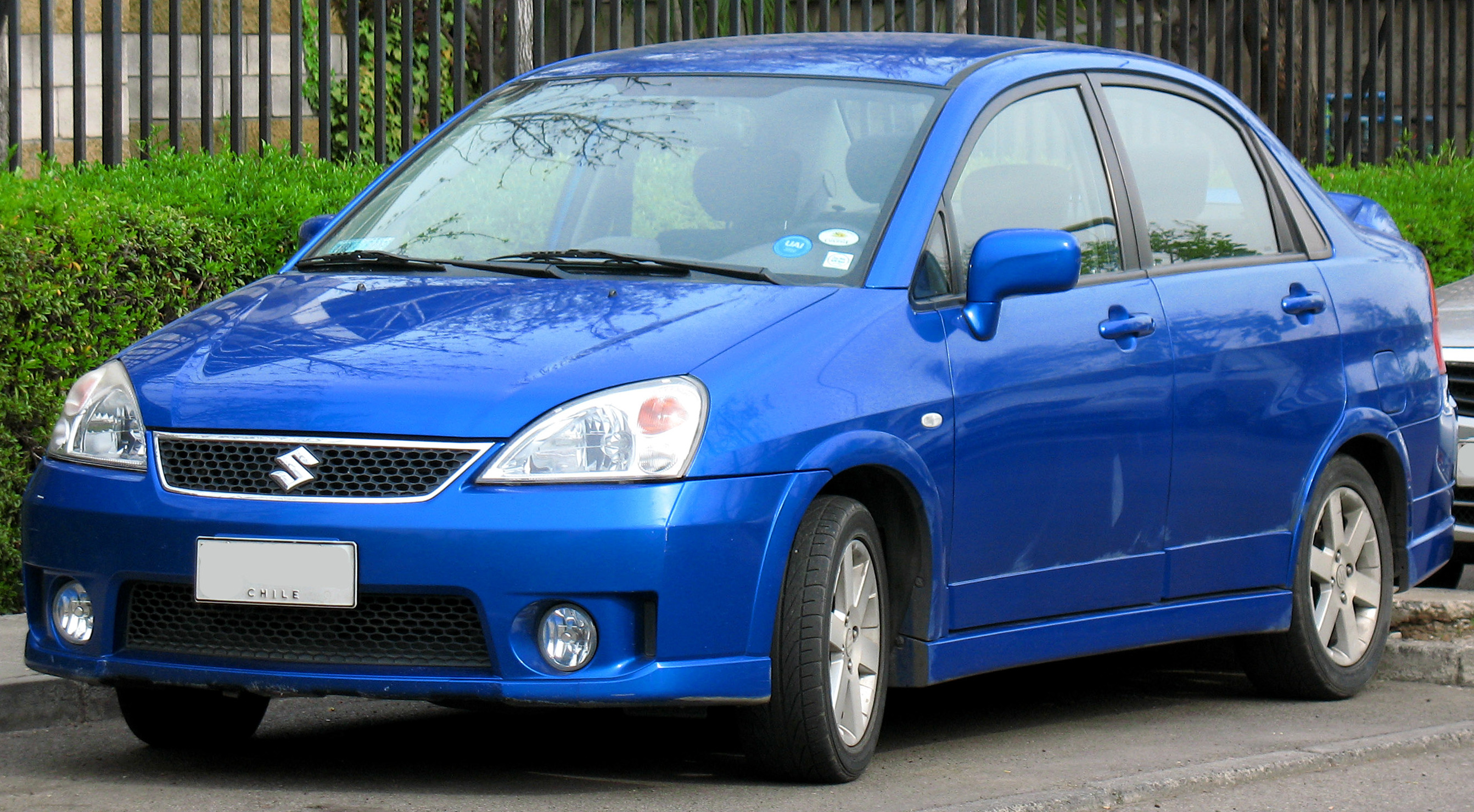
Suzuki Aerio GLS sedan (front; Chile)

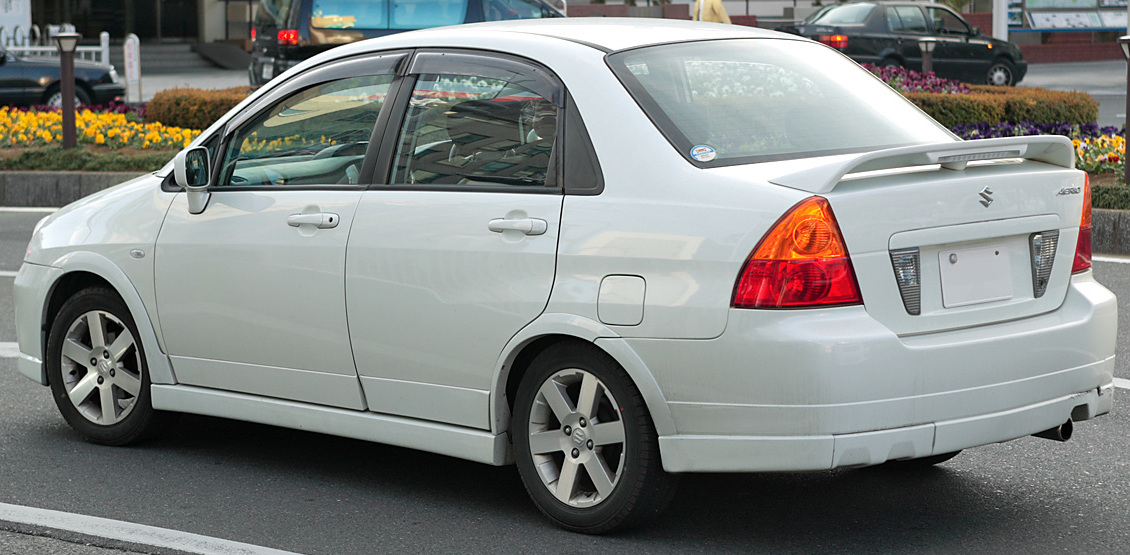
Suzuki Aerio sedan (rear; Japan)

==== Hatchback ====
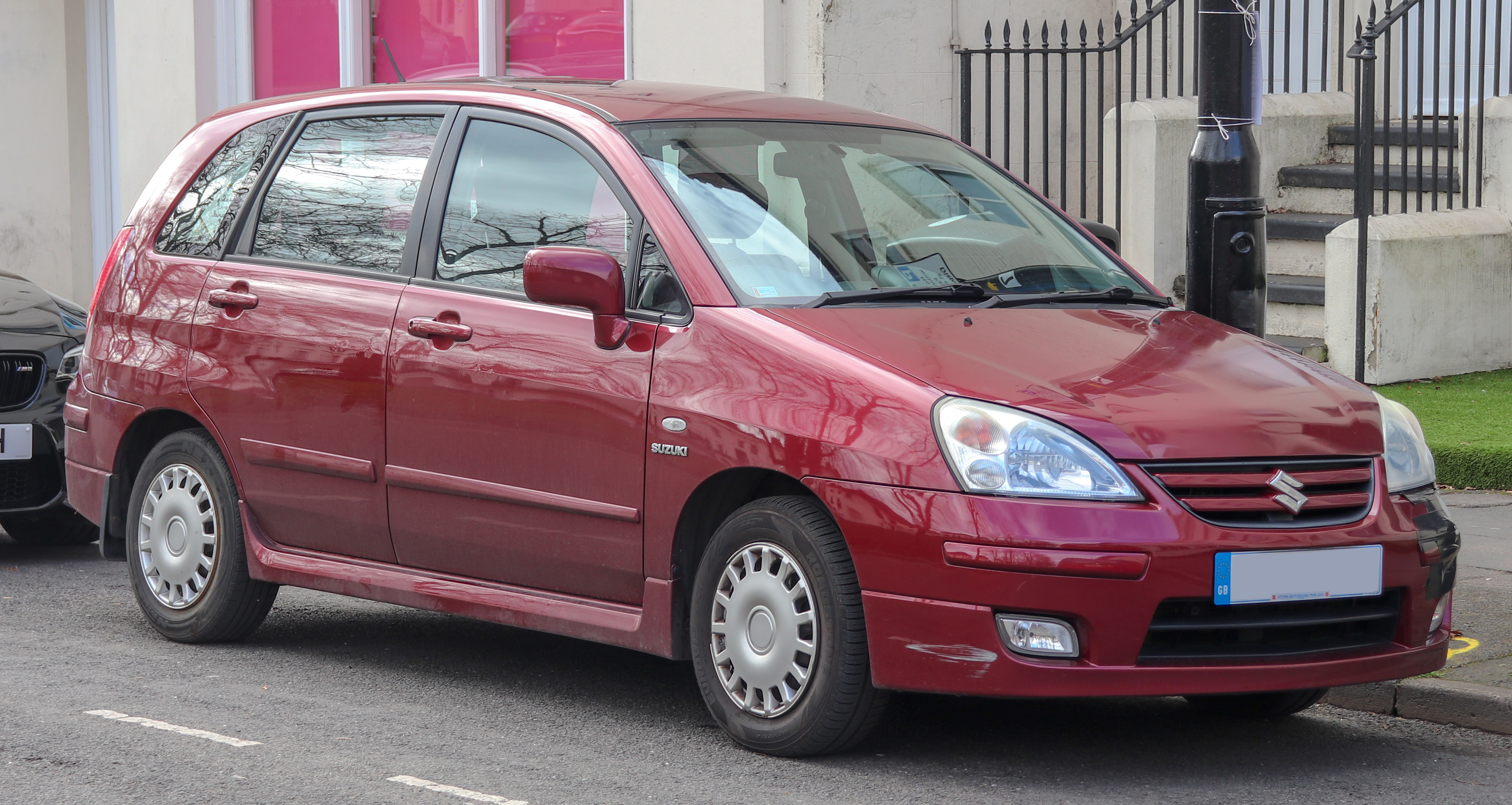
Suzuki Liana GLX hatchback (front; UK)

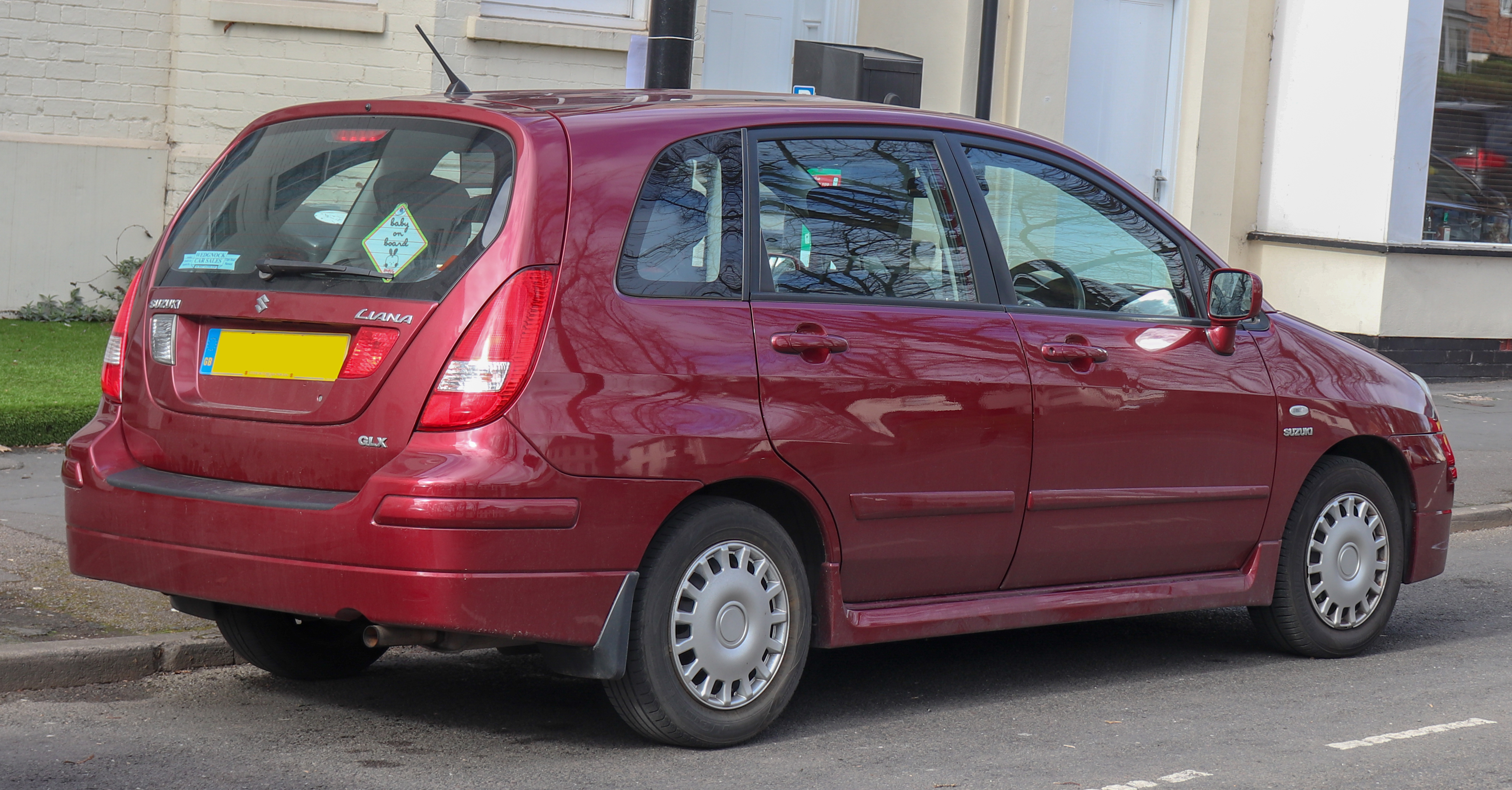
Suzuki Liana GLX hatchback (rear; UK)

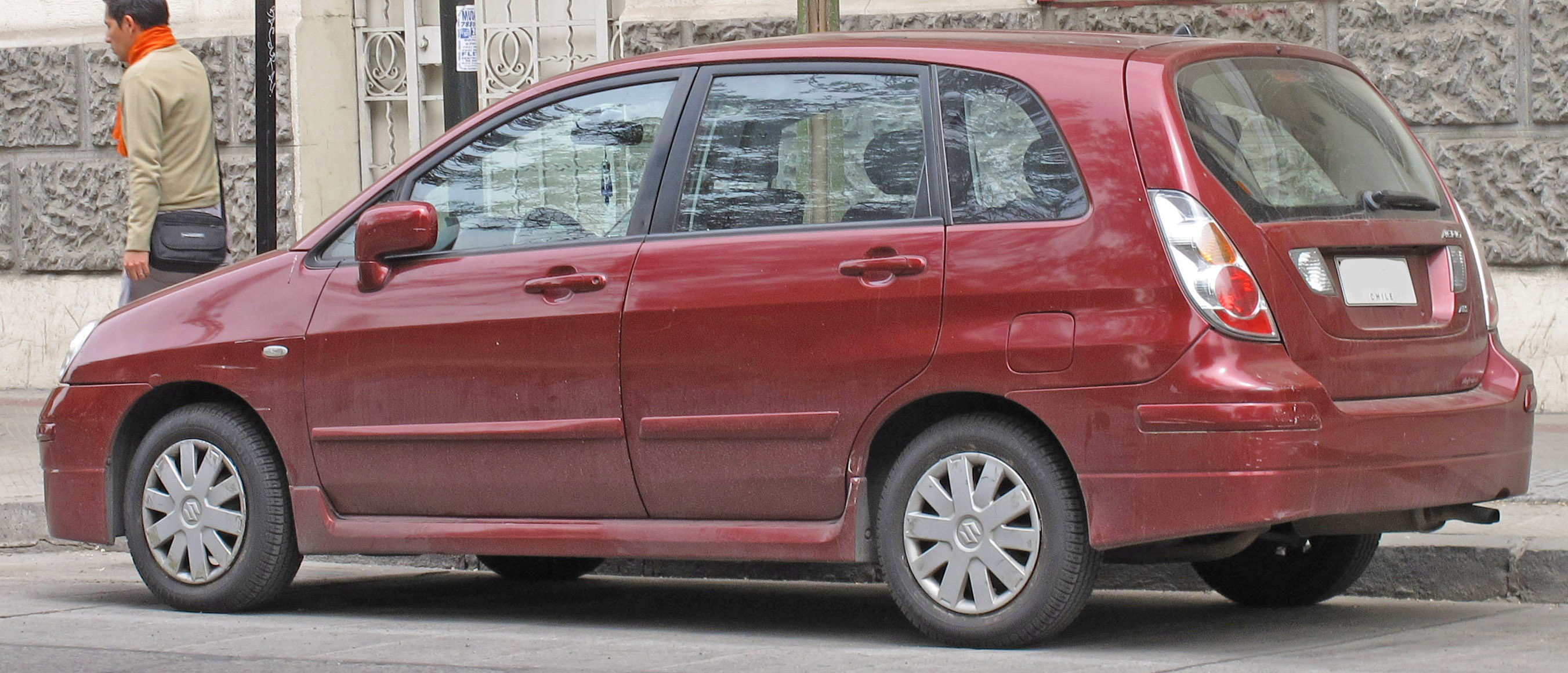
Suzuki Aerio SX (rear; Chile)

== Changhe-Suzuki Liana ==
Changhe-Suzuki in China released a new 1.4-litre Liana hatchback in October 2010, called the Liana a+, which has been sold alongside 1.6-litre versions. Prior to 2013, the Liana retained the same styling as the international version. The Liana was facelifted for sedan and hatchback models with styling unique to China in April 2013.

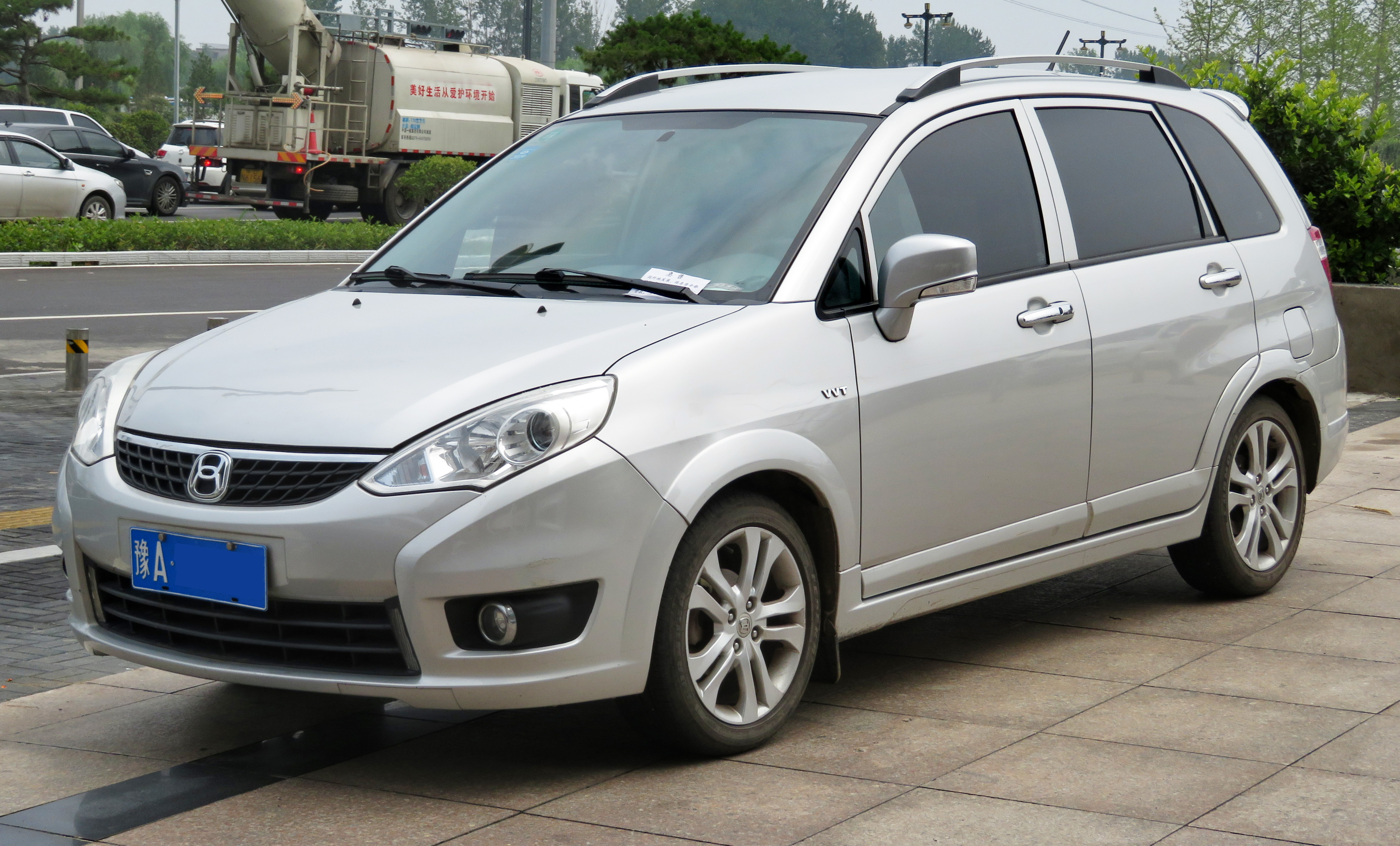
Changhe-Suzuki Liana A6 hatchback (China, second facelift)

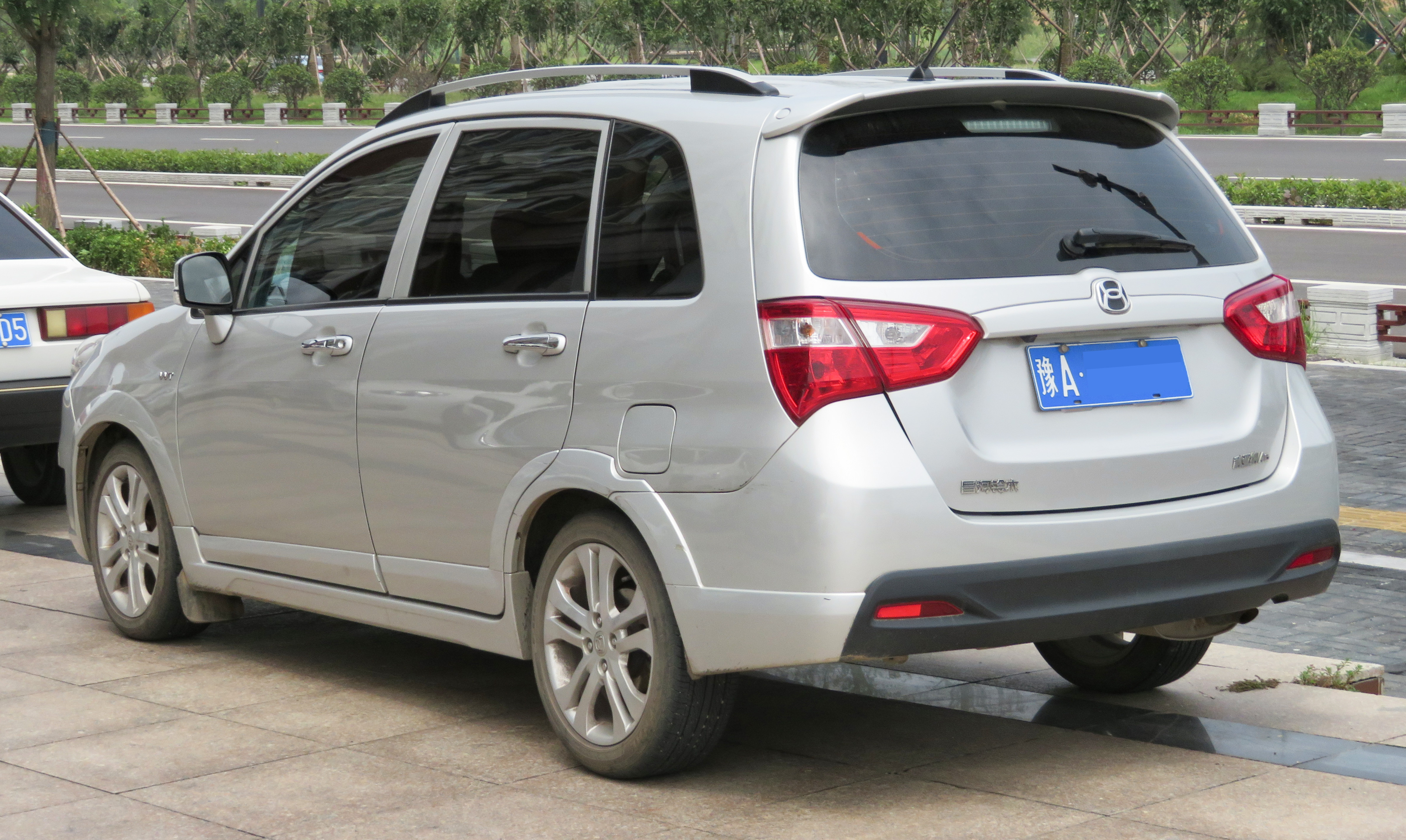
Changhe-Suzuki Liana A6 hatchback (China, second facelift)

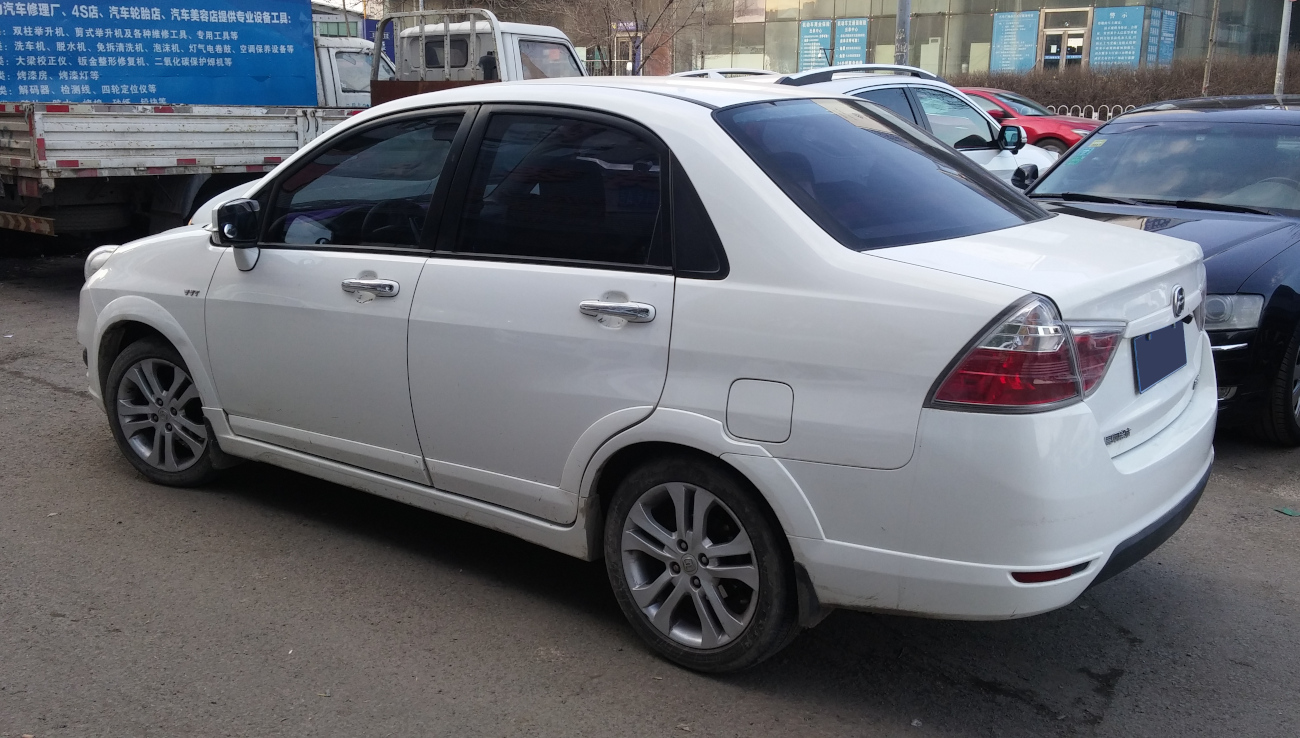
Changhe-Suzuki Liana A6 sedan (China, second facelift)

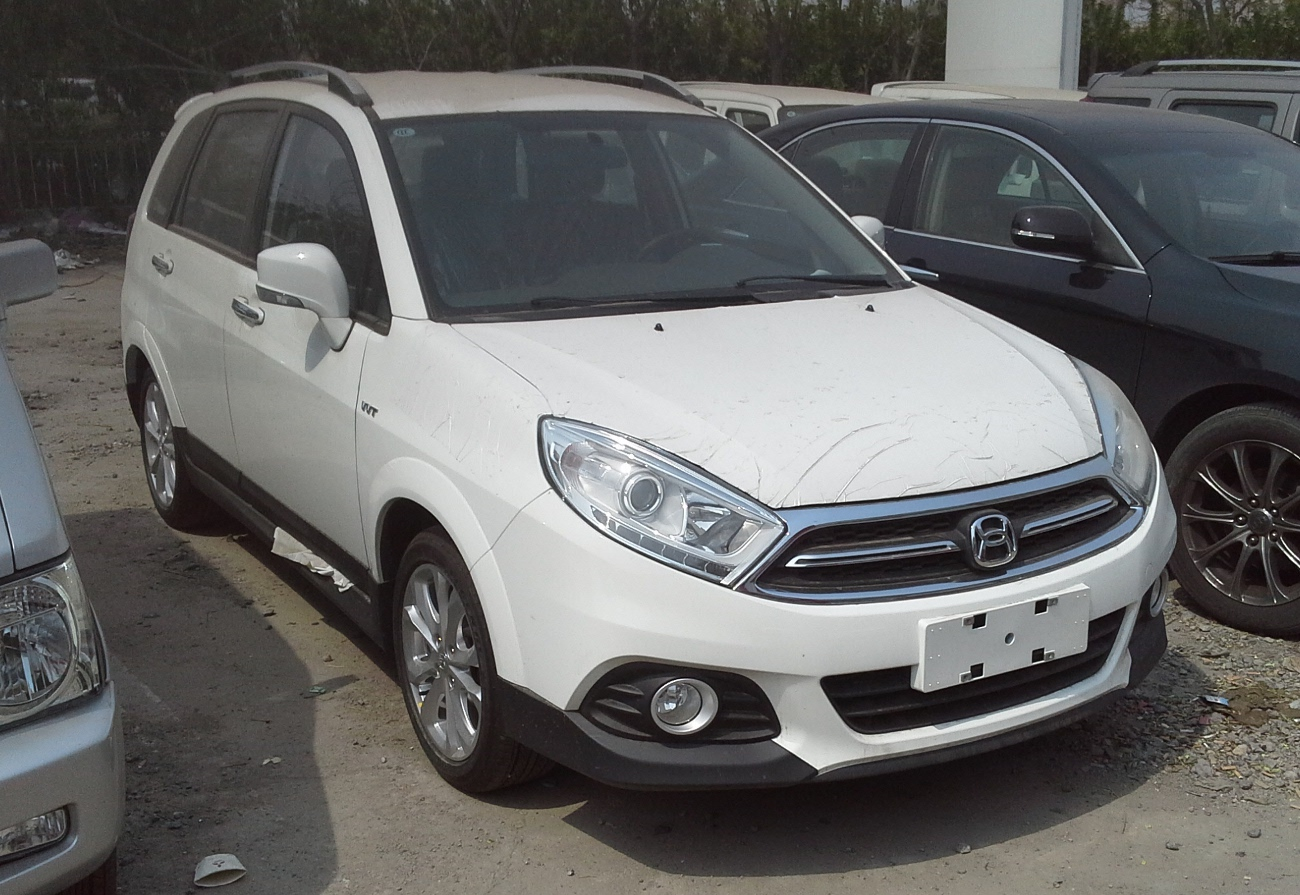
Changhe-Suzuki Liana A6 hatchback (China, third facelift)

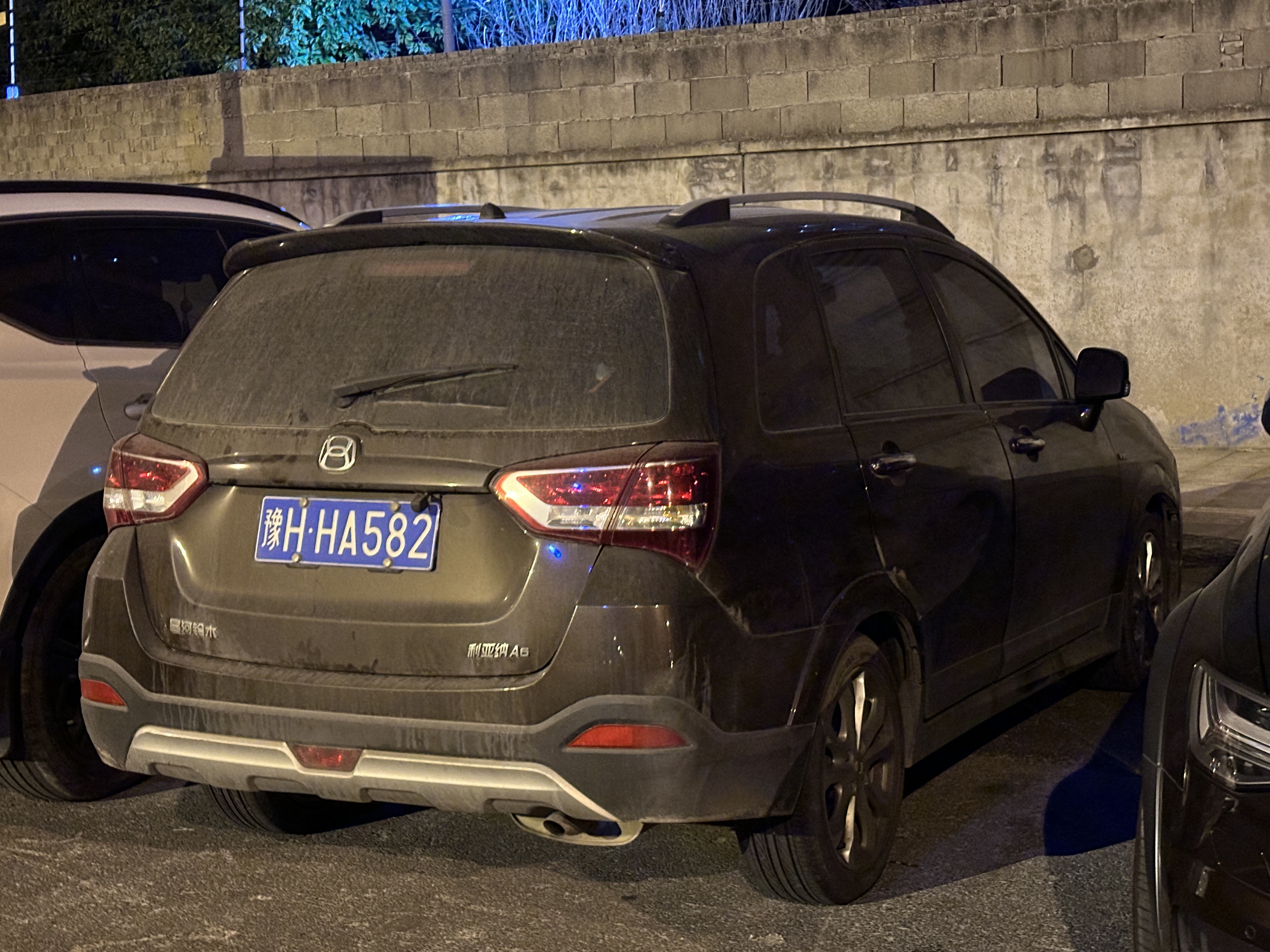
Changhe-Suzuki Liana A6 hatchback rear (China, third facelift)
