= Behind the Camera: The Cinematographer's Art =

Book by Leonard Maltin

- Author: Leonard Maltin
- Publisher: New American Library
- Publication date: 1971

Behind the Camera: The Cinematographer's Art is the fifth book by Leonard Maltin regarding movies, first published in 1971. The book is divided into two parts. The first part is an introduction to the film industry that cites technically well-done movies as well as the contributions of the cameramen and the later cinematographers highlighting their impact. The second part contains each of Maltin's interviews with five of the then leading cinematographers: Arthur C. Miller, Hal Mohr, Hal Rosson, Lucien Ballard, and Conrad Hall. The book is illustrated with samples of their best work and contains a listing of the Academy Awards for Best Cinematography from 1927 to 1970.
