= Whammy! The All-New Press Your Luck =

American television game show (2002–2003)

- Genre: Game show
- Created by: Bill Carruthers
- Directed by: R. Brian DiPirro
- Presented by: Todd Newton
- Announcer: Gary Kroeger
- Country of origin: United States
- Original language: English
- No. of seasons: 2
- No. of episodes: 130

Production
- Executive producer: Michael Weinberg
- Producer: Michael Malone
- Production location: Tribune Studios in Hollywood
- Running time: 20–22 minutes
- Production company: FremantleMedia North America

Original release
- Network: Game Show Network
- Release: April 15, 2002 – December 5, 2003

Whammy! (subtitled The All-New Press Your Luck for its first season) is an American television game show that aired new episodes on Game Show Network (GSN) from April 15, 2002, to December 5, 2003. The series was produced by FremantleMedia North America, in association with GSN. The main goal of the game is to earn as much money and prizes as possible through collecting spins by answering trivia questions correctly, then using those spins on a gameboard to win various prizes and cash amounts while attempting to avoid the show's eponymous character, the "Whammy." Contestants who do land on a Whammy lose all their prizes accumulated to that point; four Whammies eliminates a contestant from the game. The program is an updated version of Press Your Luck, which originally aired on CBS from September 19, 1983, to September 26, 1986. The series was taped at Tribune Studios and was hosted by Todd Newton, with Gary Kroeger announcing. The show aired in reruns on GSN until 2017, and came back on May 11, 2020, up until October 1, 2021.

== Gameplay ==
Gameplay remained largely similar to Press Your Luck, with contestants accumulating cash and prizes and attempting to avoid landing on a Whammy, who took away the winnings of any contestant who landed on it. At the start of the game, each of the three contestants was spotted $1,000 and took turns taking one spin at a time on the board. After each cycle of spins, additional Whammies were added to the board replacing cash values or prizes, and contestants chose to spin again or freeze with their score at that point. Any contestant who hit a Whammy was eliminated from play for the rest of the round. Play continued until all three contestants froze or hit a Whammy. Cash values ranged from $100–$1,500 in round one, and prizes of similar values also appeared.

Round two consisted of five questions (four in some episodes) posed to the players. The host read a question, and one of the contestants buzzed-in and provided a response. Their response, along with two other choices, were provided to the other two contestants, who selected one of the choices. Correct answers earned three spins for a buzz-in answer and one spin for a multiple choice answer. After five questions, all three contestants advanced to the final round.

In the final round, cash values ranged from $500–$5,000, and some spaces offered additional spins in addition to cash. Other spaces offered the choice of up to four adjacent spaces, or directed the contestants directly to another space. Any contestant who accumulated a total of four Whammies, including any that were hit in round one, was eliminated from the game. In Season Two, whenever a contestant that has been eliminated from the game by hitting a fourth Whammy, the whammy will show the contestant's scoreboard. Also added to the board were "Double Whammies," which, in addition to bankruptcy, added a physical consequence following the Whammy's appearance (e.g. spraying the contestant with water or dropping ping-pong balls on them). Play began with the contestant with the lowest score at the start of the round, or, in the case of a tie for last place, the contestant with the fewest spins. If there was still a tie in terms of score and spin totals, the contestant farthest to the left went first.

Spins earned in this round could be passed to the opponent with the higher total (if they were tied, the contestant passing the spins could choose the recipient). Contestants were required to use all spins passed until they used their spins or hit a Whammy; in the latter case, any remaining passed spins were transferred to their earned spin total. If a contestant using passed spins hit a space that awarded a spin (e.g., $3,000 + One Spin), that spin was added to the earned total. The contestant in the lead at the end of the game kept any cash and/or prizes in their bank at that time. Unlike its predecessors, three new contestants appeared on each episode.

=== Other features ===
In round one, the board featured a "Pick-a-Prize" space. Contestants who landed on it could choose any prize on the board at the time. In round two, one space labeled "$2,000 or Lose-1-Whammy" gave the contestant a choice of a cash prize of $2,000 or removing a previously landed-upon Whammy (also seen on the classic show). "$1,000 or Spin Again" offered the choice of a $1,000 cash prize or the opportunity to spin again (without using an earned spin), in season two, the cash award of this space was lowered to $555.

Contestants also had an opportunity to win a Gem Car during the game. To claim the prize, the contestant needed to land on the "GEM" space in round one, and avoid landing on a Whammy for the rest of the round. In round two, the contestant needed to land on the "CAR" space, and again avoid the Whammy, and also win the game. In season two, the GEM car was replaced with a Suzuki Aerio SX, and the contestant needed to claim both halves of a car key in order to win the prize; only one half was on the board at any given time.

A new feature called "Big Bank" was added for the second season. The Big Bank on each episode was a cumulative jackpot that began at $3,000, and any cash and prizes that the contestants lost after landing on a Whammy (including halves of the car key) were added to the Big Bank. If a contestant landed on the Big Bank square, Todd Newton asked an open-ended general knowledge question to the contestant, who could claim the money and prizes in the Big Bank with a correct answer. Once the Big Bank was claimed by a contestant, it was reset to $3,000.

==== Technological changes ====
Whammy! made use of technological advances that had been developed since the original Press Your Luck ended its run in the 1980s. For example, the prizes and light patterns for each space on the Big Board were randomly generated using a personal computer, running at a speed of 200 MHz. This resulted in a very large number of patterns for gameplay, which prevented memorisation of patterns as Michael Larson did on Press Your Luck (the same holds true for all subsequent versions, Todd Newton once referred to it as “Larson-proof”). Also, the Whammy animations were animated in 3D computer graphics, rather than being digitally hand-drawn as on Press Your Luck.

== Production ==
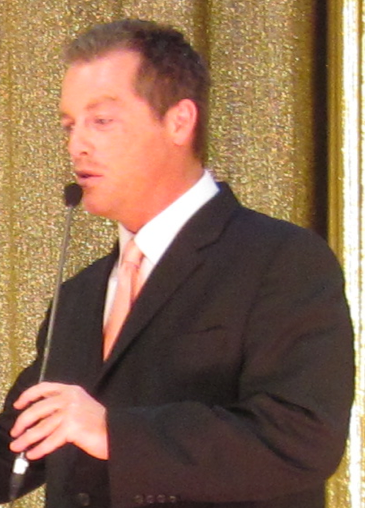
Host Todd Newton in January 2010

Game Show Network (GSN) acquired the rights to air Press Your Luck in September 2001, and high viewership ratings prompted the network to order a revival of the series. Two pilots were taped on February 13, 2002: one with original Press Your Luck host Peter Tomarken and the other hosted by Todd Newton. Newton was ultimately chosen to host the show. Tomarken explained that he was asked to change his style of hosting, saying, "It was terribly hurtful and I think I was doomed before I did [the audition]. I remember being told, 'No, no. Be nice. Be sure everybody likes you.' I took that advice with the pilot. I made the same mistake." In his 2018 memoir, Newton wrote that the despite the competition with Tomarken for the role, "we were both gentlemen.…There was nothing confrontational about it. It was simply a case of old school versus new school." Tomarken acknowledged that GSN wanted to employ a younger host in an effort to attract a younger audience. Newton also recalled, "focus groups felt a younger host blended better with the new set. And, unfortunately for Peter, network executives were getting younger and younger." Tomarken later made a guest appearance hosting the question round of a special episode in the second season, which would be his last television appearance before his death in a plane crash in 2006.

GSN produced 65 episodes for the first season, which began airing April 15, 2002. The series was eventually renewed for a second season, which consisted of 65 additional episodes that premiered March 17, 2003. Following the conclusion of the Tournament of Champions, which completed its run on July 25, 2003, a combination of first-run new episodes and reruns continued to air until December 5. Additionally, a short-lived Filipino version of the show aired on GMA Network in 2007–08. The series, entitled Whammy! Push Your Luck, was hosted by Paolo Bediones and Rufa Mae Quinto.

=== Special episodes ===
The show aired four holiday specials: a Mother's Day special (featuring an all-cash board and with Karen Grassle (Little House on the Prairie), Estelle Harris (Seinfeld) and Mimi Kennedy as contestants)), a Halloween special (featuring contestants in costume), a St. Patrick's Day special that served as the show's second season premiere (with the contestants wearing green, and all the whammy animations in green as well), and an April Fools' Day special that featured Graham Elwood (from Cram) as the episode's host, with Newton only appearing when a contestant hit a Double Whammy.

Tomarken, Janie Litras, and Ed Long appeared on a special episode coinciding with GSN's documentary Big Bucks: The Press Your Luck Scandal. Litras and Long originally appeared on the episodes airing June 8 and 11, 1984, competing against Michael Larson, who had memorized the light pattern and went on to win $110,237. Larson's brother, James, competed in the 2003 episode against Litras and Long, as Michael had died of throat cancer in 1999. James would win the game with a digital grand piano worth $6,695.

The July 21, 2003 episode featured a "Tournament of Losers" starring three past contestants who had lost their previous games. July 22–25 of that same week in 2003 featured a Tournament of Champions, with nine of the biggest winners to that point competing for additional cash and prizes. The winners on the Tuesday, Wednesday, and Thursday episodes returned to compete against each other on the Friday episode in the finale of the tournament. Friday's episode featured higher-valued spaces in both rounds, and the eventual winner also received a Suzuki Aerio SX as a bonus prize in addition to their grand total winnings.

== Reception ==
Whammy! lasted on GSN for only two seasons, leading Garin Pirnia of Mental Floss to deem the series "[not] a huge hit like its predecessor." At the sixth World Media Economics Conference, Eileen O'Neill and Marianne Barrett listed Whammy! among several television series that used creative methods of advertising in their programs, noting GSN's ability to "encourage viewers to watch the programs live." The series was also mentioned in Steve Ryan and Fred Wostbrock's The Ultimate TV Game Show Book in a list of GSN original programs. It would not be until 2019 that another revival of Press Your Luck would air, with this version being hosted by Elizabeth Banks on ABC.
