= Whammy! Push Your Luck =

Philippine television game show

- Title card
- Genre: Game show
- Based on: Whammy! The All-New Press Your Luck (2002) by Bill Carruthers
- Directed by: Caesar Cosme
- Presented by: Paolo Bediones; Rufa Mae Quinto
- Country of origin: Philippines
- Original language: Tagalog
- No. of episodes: 105

Production
- Executive producer: Wilma Galvante
- Camera setup: Multiple-camera setup
- Running time: 30–45 minutes
- Production company: GMA Entertainment TV

Original release
- Network: GMA Network
- Release: October 8, 2007 – February 29, 2008

Whammy! Push Your Luck is a Philippine television game show broadcast by GMA Network. The show is based on American game shows Second Chance and Whammy! The All-New Press Your Luck. Hosted by Paolo Bediones and Rufa Mae Quinto, it premiered on October 8, 2007. The show concluded on February 29, 2008, with a total of 105 episodes.

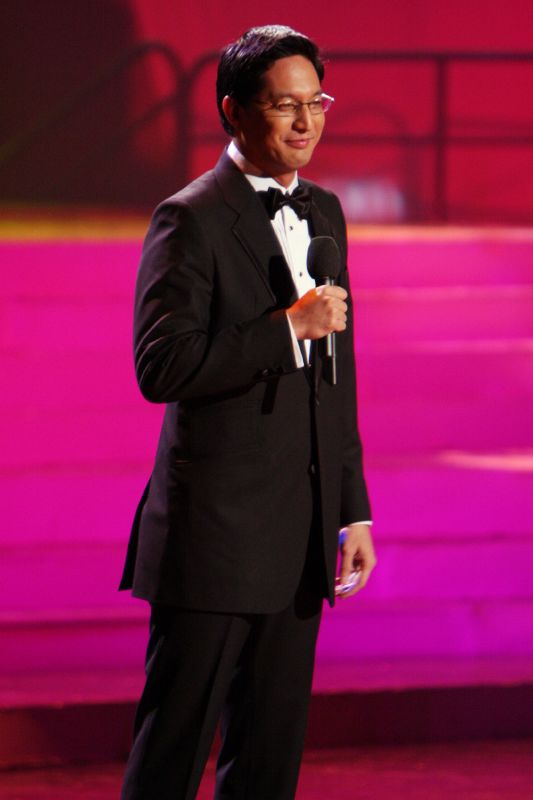
Paolo Bediones served as a host.
