= Todd Newton =

American television personality

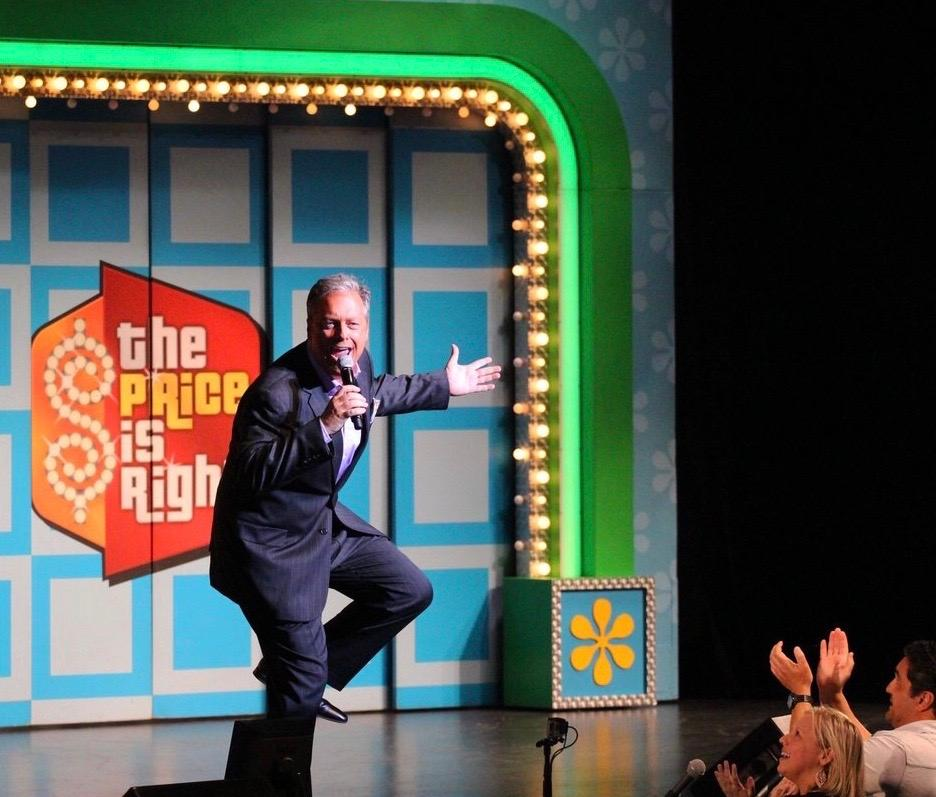
- Todd Newton hosting The Price Is Right Live! in 2019
- Born: James Todd Newton; St. Louis, Missouri, U.S.
- Occupations: Game show host, performer, author, radio personality
- Years active: 1990–present
- Website: www.toddnewtononline.com

James Todd Newton is an American entertainment reporter, game show host, and author.

== Career ==
Todd Newton started his entertainment career at age sixteen as a disc jockey for Kincaid Entertainment in St. Louis. His first radio job was at Hot 97 in St. Louis. Later, the company found a role for him on its KMOV children's television show Gator Tales.

While visiting Los Angeles in 1994 to report on Hollywood for St. Louis television station KPLR, Newton — then a radio personality known as Rikk Idol, signed with an agent and became a host on E! Entertainment Television in 1995.

Mentored by Sande Stewart and Bob Barker, Newton has also hosted The Price Is Right Live!, GSN's Hollywood Showdown, Powerball Instant Millionaire, In Search of The Partridge Family, World's Wildest Game Shows, and Whammy! The All-New Press Your Luck.

Newton was presented with the Daytime Emmy Award for Outstanding Game Show Host in 2012 for his work on Hasbro Studios' Family Game Night.

Newton has hosted programs at American radio stations including WKBQ in his hometown of St. Louis, KIIS and KBIG in Los Angeles, WNEW in New York, and the syndicated All Nite Cafe. In January 2015, he helped launch a new radio station in St. Louis called NOW 96.3 KNOU and was inducted into the St. Louis Media Hall of Fame.

He later hosted the syndicated Monopoly Millionaires' Club alongside comic Billy Gardell.

He is currently the host of The Host with the Most podcast, The Tattooed Traveler travel series on DBTV, Roku, Amazon Fire, and YouTube as well as the syndicated radio program The Todd Newton Morning Show with Maria Todd.

== Television credits ==
- Gator Tales (1986)
- E! (1995–2007)
- Hollywood Showdown (2000–2001)
- Whammy! The All-New Press Your Luck (2002–2003)
- Powerball Instant Millionaire (2002–2004)
- Hot Ticket (2003)
- Performing As... (2004)
- Reality Remix (2004–2006)
- Made in the USA (2005)
- Gameshow Marathon (2006, road reporter and prize presenter)
- The All-New Catchphrase (2006 (pilot), host)
- Home Shopping Network (2007–2008)
- GSN Live (2009)
- Family Game Night (2010–2014)
- Monopoly Millionaires' Club (2015–2016, co-host)
- ShopHQ (2018–2020)

== Written works ==
- 2012, Life in the Bonus Round ISBN 978-1986466745
- 2013, Create A Superstar Demo ISBN 978-1301818877
- 2013, Feedback: Friend or Foe ISBN 978-1301982653
- 2014, First And Last Month: A Play ISBN 978-1499533187
- 2016, The Host With The Most: Tales Of A Tattooed Television Personality ISBN 978-1523959501
- 2024, Mister Razzle Dazzle: The Lavish And Luminous Life Of A Living Legend ISBN 979-8339339588
- 2025, CHUG & CHOW: The Tattooed Traveler's 50 Favorite Dive Bars & Food Joints Across America ISBN 979-8282626407
