= Suzuki G engine =

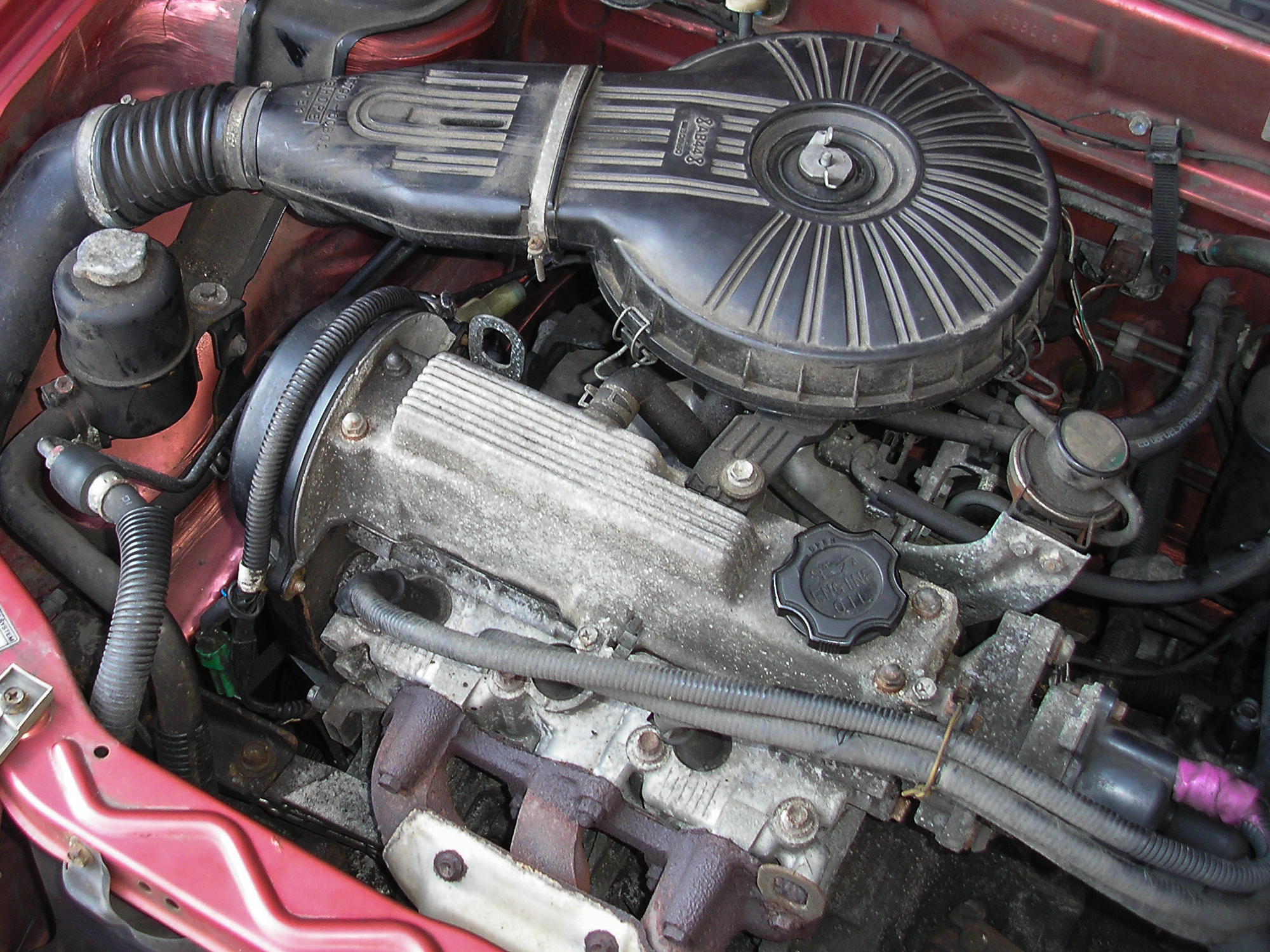
- G10A engine in a SF310 Swift

Overview
- Manufacturer: Suzuki

Layout
- Configuration: Inline-three; Inline-four
- Displacement: 1.0 L; 60.6 cu in (993 cc); 1.2 L; 73.0 cu in (1,196 cc); 1.3 L; 79.2 cu in (1,298 cc); 1.3 L; 80.8 cu in (1,324 cc); 1.4 L; 83.0 cu in (1,360 cc); 1.5 L; 91.1 cu in (1,493 cc); 1.6 L; 97.0 cu in (1,590 cc)
- Cylinder bore: 71 mm (2.8 in); 72 mm (2.83 in); 74 mm (2.91 in); 75 mm (2.95 in)
- Piston stroke: 61 mm (2.4 in); 75 mm (2.95 in) (Indonesia); 75.5 mm (2.97 in); 77 mm (3.03 in); 84.5 mm (3.33 in); 90 mm (3.54 in)
- Cylinder block material: Aluminum
- Cylinder head material: Aluminum
- Valvetrain: SOHC 2 or 4 valves per cylinder DOHC 4 valves per cylinder (G13B/K)
- Valvetrain drive system: Timing belt
- Compression ratio: From 8.3:1 to 11.5:1

RPM range
- Max. engine speed: 6500-8600 rpm

Combustion
- Turbocharger: In G10T only
- Fuel system: Carburetor; Multi-port fuel injection (Model Dependent)
- Fuel type: Gasoline; CNG
- Oil system: Wet sump
- Cooling system: Water-cooled

Output
- Power output: 48–116 hp (36–87 kW; 49–118 PS) at 5,100 rpm up to 7,600 rpm
- Specific power: 48.3 hp (36.0 kW; 49.0 PS)-87.1 hp (65.0 kW; 88.3 PS) per litre
- Torque output: 77–146 N⋅m (57–108 lb⋅ft) at 3,200 rpm up to 4,500 rpm

The Suzuki G engine is a series of three- and four-cylinder internal combustion engines manufactured by Suzuki Motor Corporation for various automobiles, primarily based on the GM M platform, as well as many small trucks such as the Suzuki Samurai and Suzuki Vitara and their derivatives.

== Straight-threes ==
=== G10 ===
The G10 (sometimes referred to as the "G10A" to set it apart from the later G10B) and G10T are a 1.0 L (993 cc) straight-three gasoline four-stroke engine using aluminum alloy for the block, cylinder head and pistons. A 74 mm × 77 mm (2.91 in × 3.03 in) bore and stroke give the engine a total of 1.0 L; 60.6 cu in (993 cc) of displacement. Depending on year and market, the G10 could come with either a carburetor or electronic fuel injection, and was also offered as the G10T featuring an IHI RHB31/32 turbocharger. It has a single overhead camshaft driving six valves. Cylinder spacing is 84 mm (3.31 in), as for the four-cylinder G13/G15/G16 engines. Both the G10 and G10T engines came with forged iron connecting rods.

Early G10 engines (1988 and older) used a hemispherical head design with rocker arms and mechanical lifters. Valve sizes were 36 millimeter for the intake and 30 millimeter exhaust. Later G10 engines (1989 and newer) received throttle-body fuel injection and replaced the rocker arm valvetrain for a direct-acting camshaft with hydraulic lifters. Coolant now left the engine via the cylinder head, and the valve sizes decreased to 35 millimeter intake and 28 millimeter exhaust. Despite the smaller valves, more restrictive cylinder head and identical compression ratio, horsepower numbers actually increased for the 1989 update. A detuned 49 hp (37 kW; 50 PS) unit, with a slightly different camshaft, two-ring pistons and differently tuned engine control unit, was used in the ultra-fuel-efficient Geo Metro XFi model, which delivered as much as 58 mpg_{‑US} (4.1 L/100 km; 70 mpg_{‑imp}). In the US, the G10 in the 2000 Chevrolet Metro became the last engine available on an American-sold vehicle to use throttle body injection for fuel delivery.

Most naturally-aspirated models had a 9.5:1 compression ratio, though early carbureted fuel economy-based variants had a higher 9.8:1 ratio. Early and late G10T engines shared an 8.3:1 compression ratio. Engine output numbers fluctuated throughout the years and tended to vary between regions; with Japanese models often having the highest ratings. For the Netherlands in 1982, the G10 was rated for 50 PS (39 kW, 49 BHP) at 5800 RPM and 74.5 Nm (55 lb·ft) at 3600 RPM. For Japan in 1983, the G10 was rated at a much higher 60 PS (59 BHP) at 5500 RPM and 8.5 kg-m (61 lb·ft) of torque, while the Japanese G10T made 80 PS (59 kW) at 5500 rpm and 12.0 kg·m (87 lb·ft) of torque at 3500 rpm. Meanwhile, for North America, the standard G10 was rated for the 48 horsepower at 5100 RPM and 57 lb·ft at 3200 RPM. Despite having a higher compression ratio, horsepower ratings for the efficiency-focused G10 seen in the Chevrolet Sprint ER were lowered to 46 horsepower at 5100 RPM, with torque at 58 lb·ft at 3200 RPM. The early North American G10T was rated for 70 hp (52 kW) at 5500 rpm and 79 lb·ft at 3500 rpm, with torque increasing to 80 lb·ft as of 1989. Other differences between markets include "Electronic Fuel Injection" for some North American models (most commonly on the 1989+ G10T), instead of "Electronic Petrol Injection" internationally (and on some early North American models), and Japanese models being equipped with a different air filter shroud.

For 1989, the G10 engines were updated, with the most significant changes being the fuel injection and valvetrain changes listed above. Compression remained at 9.5:1, but power increased for most markets (with the exception being Japan). In the Netherlands, power and torque increased to 53 PS (39 kW) at 5700 RPM, and 80 N⋅m (59 lb⋅ft) at 3000 rpm. For North America, ratings went up to 55 horsepower at 5700 rpm and 58 lb·ft at 3300 RPM on the standard G10, 49 horsepower at 4700 rpm and 58 lb·ft of torque at 3300 rpm for the economy G10, but nearly unchanged for the G10T with 70 horsepower at 5500 rpm and 80 lb·ft at 3500 rpm. In Japan, power dropped slightly to 57 horsepower at 6000 RPM and 58 lb·ft of torque at 3500 RPM.

The G10 was updated again in 1992 for some markets, albeit with much smaller changes than in 1989. These changes aligned with the facelift that the GM M-Body cars received. The vacuum-controlled ignition advance was replaced with electronic advance, controlled by the ECU. Nearly all markets now sold the G10 equipped with an exhaust gas recirculation system. The valve cover was also replaced with a smoother, finned housing, compared to the flat blocky cover found previously. Power numbers remained unchanged, except for in 1992 specifically, where they dropped to 52 horsepower at 5700 rpm and 56 lb·ft of torque at 3300 rpm.

Because of the physics of the straight-three engine, the G10 tends not to idle as smoothly as other engines such as a straight-six engine. This engine has a non-interference valvetrain design.

Applications:

- 1985–2001 Suzuki Cultus and global nameplate siblings: Chevrolet Sprint, Geo/Chevrolet Metro, Pontiac Firefly, Suzuki Swift, Suzuki Forsa
- November 1984– Suzuki Cultus AA41S AB41S
- 1988– Suzuki Cultus AA43S AA43V AB43S AA44S AB44S

Ultralight aircraft

- ICP Savannah

=== G10T (turbo) ===
Through the 1983-1991 model years a turbocharged MPFI version of the G10 was offered in some markets. This engine delivered 70 hp (52 kW; 71 PS) at 5500 rpm and 79 lb⋅ft (107 N⋅m) at 3500 rpm. This turbocharged engine, with mechanical lifters, was available in both the US and Canadian Firefly/Sprint/Forsa from 1987 to 1988. Only the Canadian Firefly/Sprint had this option, with hydraulic lifters, in the 1989-1991 model years. In the Japanese domestic market, the car was originally carbureted (80 PS (59 kW; 79 hp) JIS at 5500 rpm, 118 N⋅m (87 lb⋅ft) at 3500 rpm) and went on sale in June 1984. In October 1987, along with a facelift, the home market Turbo received fuel injection and power output went up to 82 PS (60 kW; 81 hp) JIS, torque to 120 N⋅m (89 lb⋅ft). It was a short-lived version, however, as by September 1988 the car was no longer on sale in the Japanese domestic market. As the only market in the world, Canada did continue to receive this engine for its versions of the second generation Cultus.

== Straight-fours ==
=== G10B ===
The G10B was an all-aluminium engine, a four-cylinder 1.0 L (993 cc) 72 mm × 61 mm (2.83 in × 2.40 in) SOHC 16-valve engine which produces 60 PS (44 kW; 59 hp) at 6000 rpm and 78 N⋅m (58 lb⋅ft) of torque at 4500 rpm. It was sold in both carburetted and MPFI form. It was widely used in motorsport in India due to its lightweight and tunability. The mounting points of the engine block were similar to that of the G13 and so an engine swap was a relatively easy task. It was phased out when production of Zen ceased in 2006. It was made only in India but was sold in all countries the Zen was sold. The 16-valve version is also known as the G10BB.

But the Zen which was sold as Suzuki Alto 1.0 in Europe came with a detuned, 8-valve version of the G10B engine which produces 54 PS (40 kW; 53 hp) at 5500 rpm and 77 N⋅m (57 lb⋅ft) of torque at 4500 rpm.

- 1993–2006 Maruti Zen (sold as Suzuki Alto in Europe, Australia).
- 2007–2017 Suzuki Cultus hatchback (Pakistan)
- 1999–2007 Ford Pronto (Taiwan)

=== G12 ===
The G12B is an inline-four engine using aluminum alloy for the block, cylinder head and pistons. It is derived from the G13BB engine by reducing the bore to 71 mm (2.80 in) to displace 1.2 L (1,196 cc). Stroke remains the same at 75.5 mm (2.97 in). It has a SOHC 16V head and the fuel delivery is by multi-point fuel injection. It is BS6 (equal to early Euro 6) emissions compliant. It has lighter pistons and other detail improvements to be a more fuel efficient engine than the G13BB on which it is based. Maruti modified the engine to displace less than 1200 cc to take advantage of the reduced excise duty on such vehicles in India. It produces 73 PS (54 kW; 72 hp) at 6000 rpm and 98 N⋅m (72 lb⋅ft) at 3000 rpm for petrol variant and 65 PS (48 kW; 64 hp) at 6000 rpm and 85 N⋅m (63 lb⋅ft) at 3000 rpm for CNG variant.

- 2010–present– Maruti Eeco
- 2016–present– Maruti Suzuki Super Carry (CNG only)

=== G13 series ===
The G13 is an inline-four engine using aluminum alloy for the block, cylinder head and pistons. Displacing 1.3 L (1,324 cc) for the G13A and 1.3 L; 79.2 cu in (1,298 cc) for all other G13 engines, fuel delivery is either through a carburetor, throttle body fuel injection or multi-point fuel injection.

This engine was made with different valvetrain designs: 8 or 16 valve SOHC or 16 valve DOHC. All G13 engines have a bore and a stroke size of 74 mm × 75.5 mm (2.91 in × 2.97 in) except for the G13A engine which has a 77 mm (3.03 in) stroke. There was also a 1,360 cc (1.4 L; 83 cu in) "G13C variant built in Indonesia, combining the longer stroke with a 75 mm (2.95 in) bore.

==== G13A ====
The 1324 cc SOHC 8-valve G13A has a non-interference valvetrain design. Horsepower ranges from 60 to 70 PS with 90-100 N.m of torque.

- Bore x Stroke: 74mm x 77mm
- Compression Ratio: 8.9:1
- Cylinder Block Deck Height: 186.8mm
- Cylinder Head Volume: 32.2cc
- Head Gasket Thickness (compressed): 1.2mm
- Intake Valve O.D. 36mm
- Exhaust Valve O.D. 30mm
- It was used in the following vehicles:
  - November 1984–1988 Suzuki Cultus/Swift
  - 1984–1988 Suzuki Jimny 1300 (JA51)
  - 1985–1988 Holden Barina MB/ML (Australia/New Zealand)
  - 1986–1990 Suzuki Samurai
  - 1992–1998 Suzuki Margalla (Pakistan)

==== G13B ====
This 1298 cc DOHC 16-valve engine with bore and stroke of 74mm x 75.5mm (2.91 in x 2.97 in). It uses the older distributor driven off the intake camshaft, and produces approximately 75–101 hp (56–75 kW; 76–102 PS) at 6500 rpm / 109–112 N⋅m (80–83 lb⋅ft) at 5000 rpm. Redline is set at 7400–7600 rpm. The compression ratio is between 10.0 and 11.5:1. This engine has an interference valvetrain design, making periodic timing belt changes vital to the engine's life. It was used in the following vehicles:

- 1985 Suzuki RS/1 (prototype)
- 1986–1994 Suzuki Cultus/Swift GTi AA33S/AA34S

==== G13BA ====
The SOHC 8-valve G13BA with carburetor or single-point fuel injection and produces 68–73 PS (50–54 kW; 67–72 hp) and 100–103 N⋅m (74–76 lb⋅ft) of torque. It has 9.5:1 compression ratio and also a non-interference valvetrain design. 1995 to 1997 U.S. and Canadian-market engines gained hydraulic lash adjusters. It was used in the following vehicles:

- 1989 Suzuki Sidekick (JA trim)
- 1989–1993 Holden Barina - (carburetor: 71 hp (53 kW; 72 PS) at 6,000 rpm; 102 N⋅m (10 kg⋅m; 75 lb⋅ft) at 4,000 rpm)
- 1989–1997 Suzuki Swift
- 1991–1995 Suzuki Samurai
- 1991–2004 Chevrolet Swift
- 1992–1997 Geo Metro
- 1993–1998 Suzuki Jimny (JB31/32)
- 1994–2000 Maruti Esteem
- 1996–2004 Subaru Justy
- June 1994–March 2000 Maruti Gypsy King

==== G13BB ====
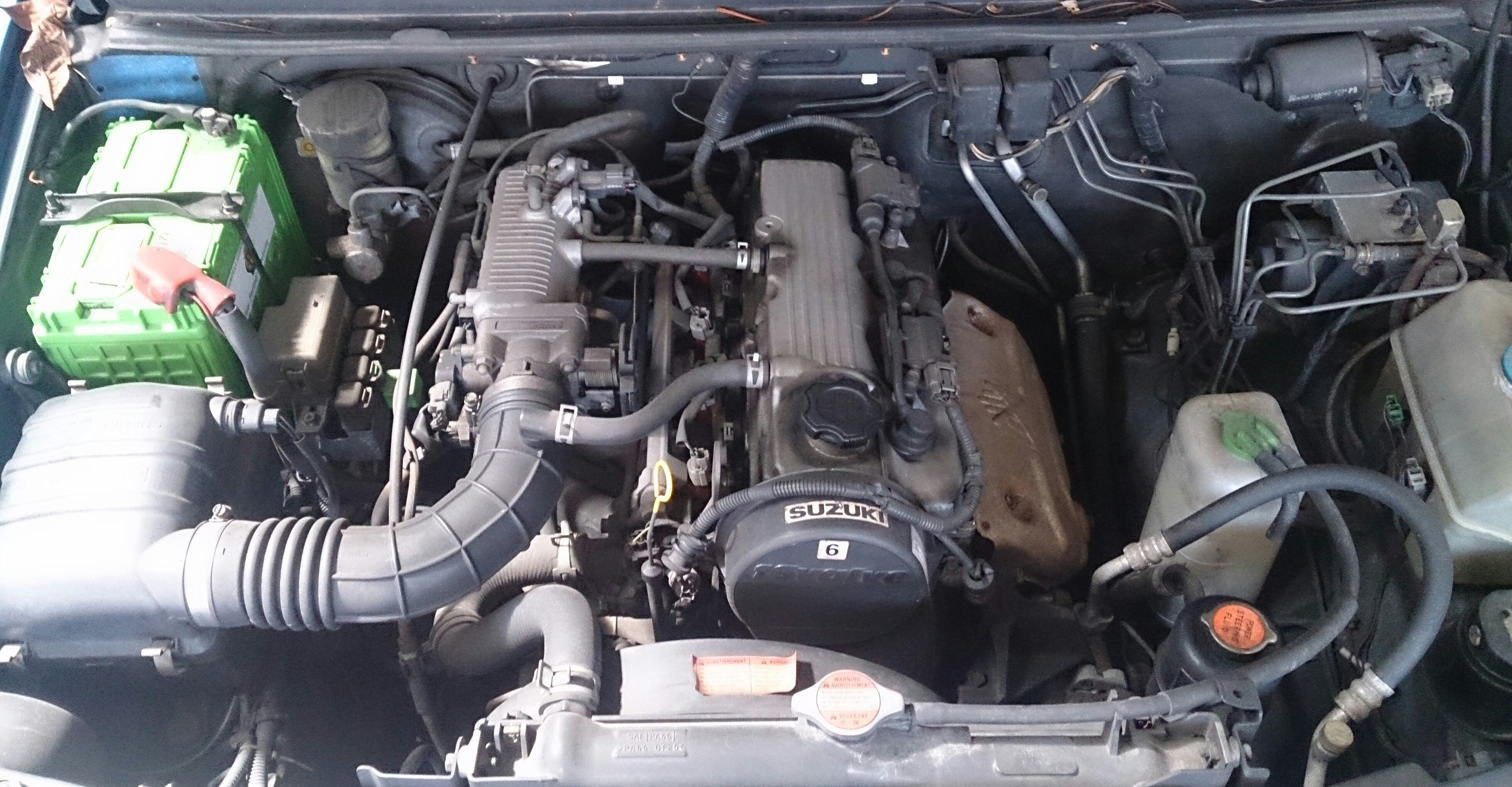
The G13BB engine in a third generation Jimny

The SOHC 16-valve G13BB (introduced in March 1995) has electronic multi-point fuel injection (MPFI), generating 56–63 kW (76–86 PS; 75–84 hp) and 104–115 N⋅m (11–12 kg⋅m; 77–85 lb⋅ft). The G13BB uses a wasted spark arrangement of two coils bolted directly to the valve cover. This engine uses a MAP sensor to monitor manifold pressure, similar to the G16B series. This engine has a non-interference valvetrain design. It uses the same G series block found in many other Suzuki models and so it is a popular conversion into the Suzuki Sierra/Samurai, which uses either a G13A (85-88) or G13BA (88.5-98). This allows the engine to fit into the engine bay simply as engine and gearbox mounts are identical and both engines are mounted north–south. It was used in the following vehicles:

- 1995–2002 Suzuki Cultus Crescent
- 1997–2003 Suzuki Swift
- 1998–2001 Chevrolet Metro/Pontiac Firefly/Suzuki Swift
- 1998–2003 Suzuki Jimny
- 1998–2007 Maruti Esteem
- 1999–2015 Changan Linyang
- 2000–2004 Suzuki Every Landy/Carry 1.3
- 2000–2006 Suzuki Wagon R+ (European Model)
- 2000–2017 Maruti Gypsy King
- 2001–2004 Subaru Justy
- 2001-2009 Maruti Suzuki Versa (Sold in India)

==== G13C ====
The G13C was bored out by one millimeter, for a bore and stroke of 75.0 mm × 77.0 mm (2.95 in × 3.03 in) and a displacement of 1,360 cc (1.4 L; 83 cu in). Maximum power was listed at 73 PS (54 kW; 72 hp) at 6000 rpm in 1999. This engine was developed by Suzuki's Indonesian subsidiary and also available for Malaysian market Suzuki Futura 1400. It was first used in the 1991 Suzuki Carry Futura. It was used in the following vehicles:

- 1991–1999 Suzuki Carry Futura SL413 (ST130)

==== G13K ====
"G13K" is the JDM version of G13B. It has different cams, intake and exhaust manifolds and ECU with cutoff at 8600rpm. It makes 115 hp. It was used in the Japanese version of Swift GTi called Cultus GT-i, replacing the first generation Swift GTi.

=== G15A ===
This engine is a 1.5 L (1,493 cc) 16-valve SOHC engine configuration, generating between 78–105 PS (57–77 kW; 77–104 hp) at 5500–6500 rpm and 120–128 N⋅m (89–94 lb⋅ft) at 3000–4000 rpm. It has a 75 mm (2.95 in) bore in conjunction with an 84.5 mm (3.33 in) stroke. Applications:

- 1991–1995 Suzuki Cultus sedan
- 1995–2002 Suzuki Cultus Crescent/Baleno
- 2000–2018 Suzuki Carry Futura (ST150, Indonesia)
- 2004–present Suzuki APV (Indonesia/Pakistan)
- 2011–2019 Suzuki Mega Carry (Indonesia)

=== G16 ===
The G16 is an inline-four engine displacing 1.6 L (1,590 cc). It shares the G15A's 75 mm (2.95 in) bore with a 90 mm (3.54 in) stroke.

==== G16A ====
Either 8-valve SOHC carb or EPI before 1990 or 16-valve SOHC EPI after 1990. The 16-valve G16A mainly used in Japan and some selected markets.

The carbureted G16A fitted to the Australian-market Vitara is rated to 55 kW (75 PS; 74 hp) at 5250 rpm and 90.4ftlb (122.5Nm) at 3100 rpm, figures SAE net.

The single point injection G16A fitted to the European market Vitara is rated at 59 kW (80 PS; 79 hp) at 5500 rpm and 127 N⋅m (94 lb⋅ft) at 3000 rpm (EEC net).

Applications:

- 1989–1992 Suzuki Sidekick (8-valve)
- 1988–1990 Suzuki Escudo (8-valve)
- 1990–2000 Suzuki Escudo (16-valve)
- 1990–2001 Suzuki Cultus sedan
- 1996–1998 Suzuki X-90
- 1997–2000 Suzuki Carry Futura (ST160, Indonesia)
- 2005–present Suzuki APV (except for Indonesia and Pakistan)

==== G16B ====
The SOHC G16B was the 16-valve version of G16A for worldwide market. The Suzuki G16B engine features an aluminum cylinder block with wet liners and aluminum cylinder head. Cylinder bore and piston stroke are 75.0 mm (2.95 in) and 90.0 mm (3.54 in), respectively. Compression ratio rating is 9.5:1. The G16B engine is equipped with Multi-point fuel injection (MPFI) and depending on year & market can have a distributor or distributorless ignition using two different styles of wasted spark coils. This engine produced 94–97 PS (93–96 hp; 69–71 kW) at 5,600 rpm of and 132–140 N⋅m (97–103 lb⋅ft) at 4,000 rpm. Used in the following vehicles:

- 1992–2005 Suzuki Vitara
- 1992–1997 Suzuki Cultus/Swift/Esteem
- 1995–2002 Chevrolet Tracker (Americas)
- 1995–2007 Suzuki Baleno/Esteem
- 1996–1998 Geo Tracker
- 1996–1998 Suzuki Sidekick

=== See also ===
- List of Suzuki engines
