= Suzuki Cultus Crescent =

Subcompact car manufactured by Suzuki (1995-2007)

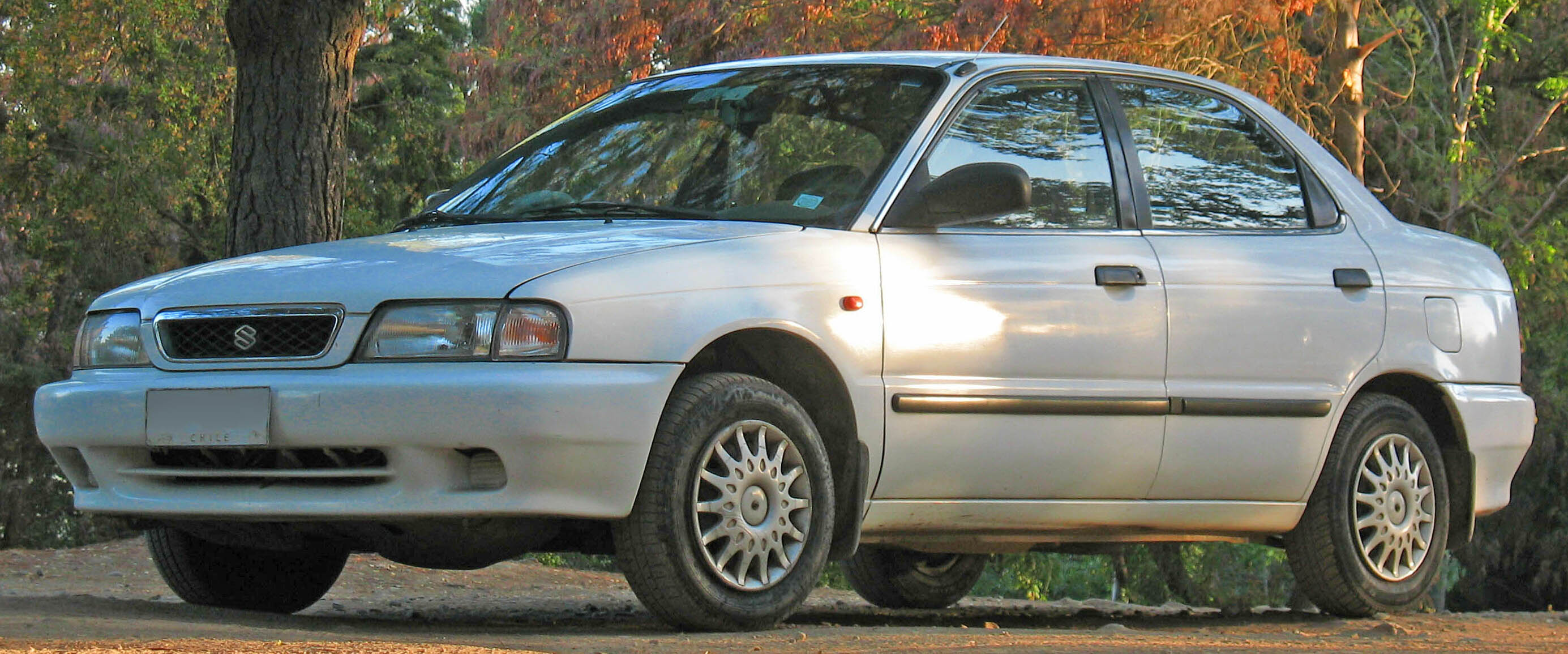
- Suzuki Baleno sedan (pre-facelift; Chile)

Overview
- Manufacturer: Suzuki
- Model code: SY
- Also called: Suzuki Baleno (International); Chevrolet Esteem (Colombia); Chevrolet Cassia (2000–2002; Philippines); Suzuki Esteem (North America, Thailand and Philippines); Suzuki Cultus Crescent (1995–1998; Japan); Maruti Suzuki Baleno (India)
- Production: 1995–2002 (Japan); 1995–2004 (Colombia); 1996–2002 (Indonesia); 1998–2005 (Pakistan); 1998–2007 (India)
- Assembly: Japan: Shizuoka (Suzuki Sagara Assembly Plant); Colombia: Bogotá (GM Colombia); India: Gurgaon (Maruti Suzuki India); Indonesia: Bekasi (Suzuki Indomobil Motor); Myanmar: Yangon (Suzuki Myanmar Motor); Pakistan: Karachi (Pak Suzuki)

Body and chassis
- Class: Subcompact car
- Body style: 3-door hatchback; 4-door sedan; 5-door station wagon/van
- Layout: Front-engine, front-wheel-drive / four-wheel-drive

Powertrain
- Engine: Petrol: 1.3 L G13BB I4; 1.5 L G15A I4 (Japan/Indonesia); 1.6 L G16A I4 (Japan); 1.6 L G16B I4; 1.8 L J18A I4; Diesel: 1.9 L XUD9 I4 turbo-diesel (Europe)
- Transmission: 5-speed manual; 3-speed automatic; 4-speed automatic; CVT

Dimensions
- Wheelbase: Hatchback: 2,380 mm (93.7 in); Sedan/Wagon: 2,480 mm (97.6 in)
- Length: Hatchback: 3,870 mm (152.4 in) (pre-facelift); 3,900 mm (153.5 in) (facelift); Sedan: 4,195 mm (165.2 in) (pre-facelift); 4,225 mm (166.3 in) (facelift); Wagon: 4,345 mm (171.1 in) (pre-facelift); 4,375 mm (172.2 in) (facelift)
- Width: Hatchback: 1,680 mm (66.1 in); Sedan/Wagon: 1,690 mm (66.5 in)
- Height: Hatchback/Sedan: 1,395 mm (54.9 in); Wagon: 1,460 mm (57.5 in); Van: 1,540 mm (60.6 in)
- Curb weight: Hatchback: 870–1,040 kg (1,918–2,293 lb); Sedan: 940–1,080 kg (2,072–2,381 lb); Wagon: 1,000–1,130 kg (2,205–2,491 lb)

Chronology
- Predecessor: Suzuki Cultus/Swift/Esteem
- Successor: Suzuki Aerio/Liana (sedan/wagon); Suzuki Swift (hatchback); Suzuki SX4 sedan (India); Chevrolet Optra (Philippines)

The Suzuki Cultus Crescent (Japanese: スズキ カルタス クレセント, Hepburn: Suzuki Karutasu Kuresento) is a subcompact car that was produced by Suzuki in Japan between 1995 and 2002, with South Asian production continuing until 2007. The Cultus Crescent was sold as such in Japan until May 1998, when it was renamed Suzuki Cultus due to the sales discontinuation of the previous Cultus in the Japanese market. The Cultus Crescent was also marketed as the Suzuki Esteem in North America, Philippines and Thailand, and as the Suzuki Baleno throughout Asia, Australasia, Europe, and Latin America. In India where it was manufactured by Maruti Suzuki, the Cultus Crescent was sold as the Maruti Suzuki Baleno. In the Philippines, the facelift model was marketed as the Chevrolet Cassia.

== History ==
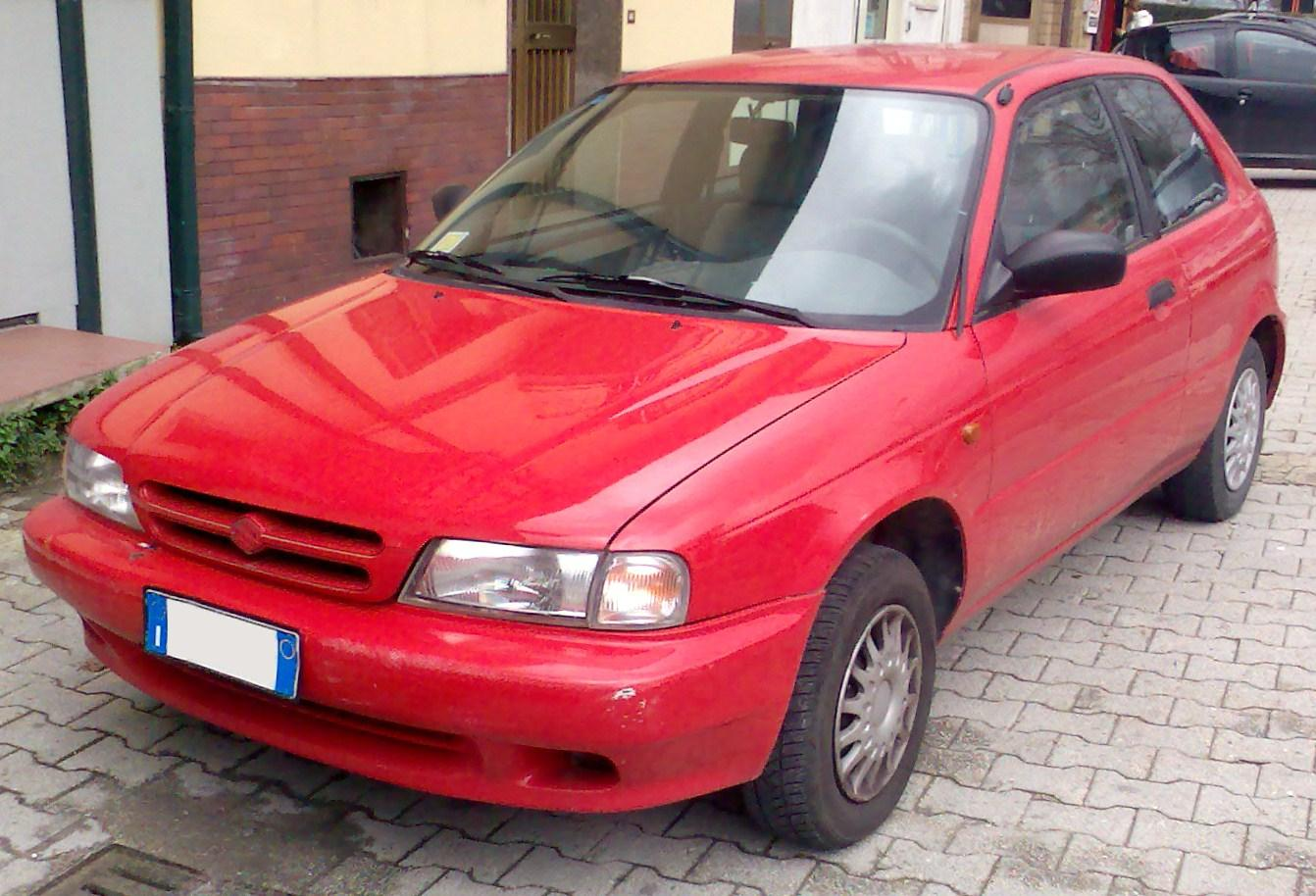
Suzuki Baleno hatchback with alternative grille (pre-facelift, Italy)

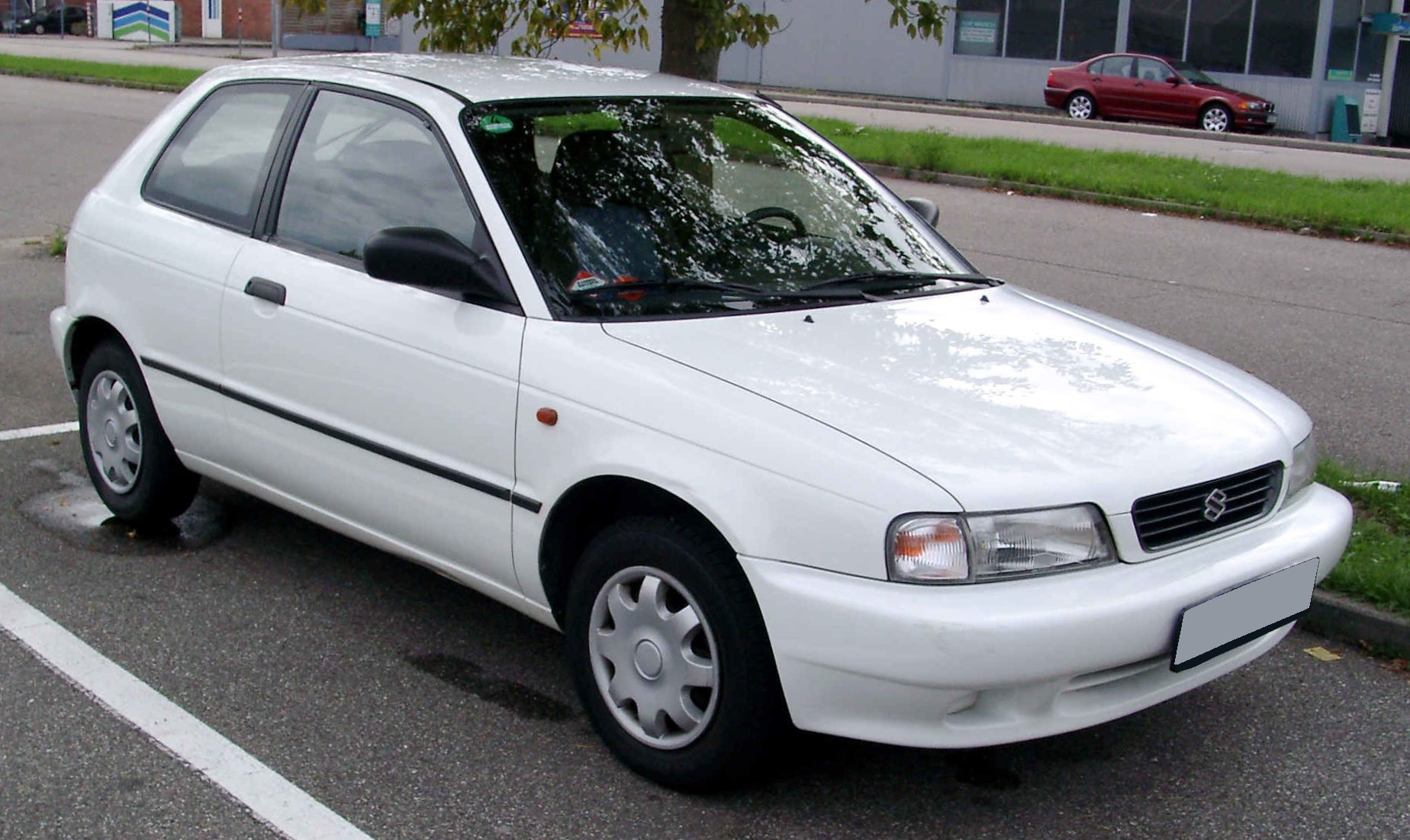
Suzuki Baleno hatchback (Germany)

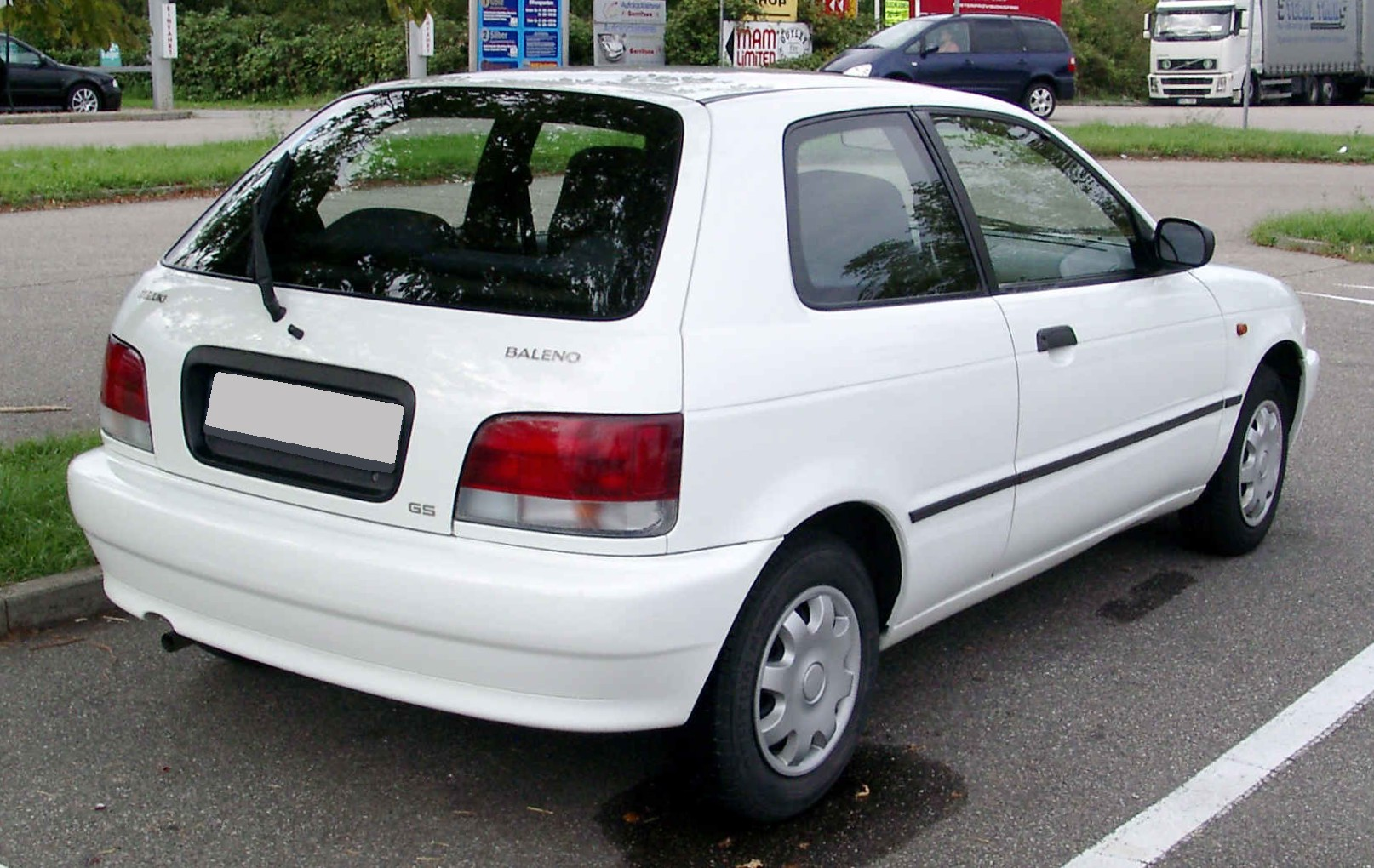
Suzuki Baleno hatchback (Germany)

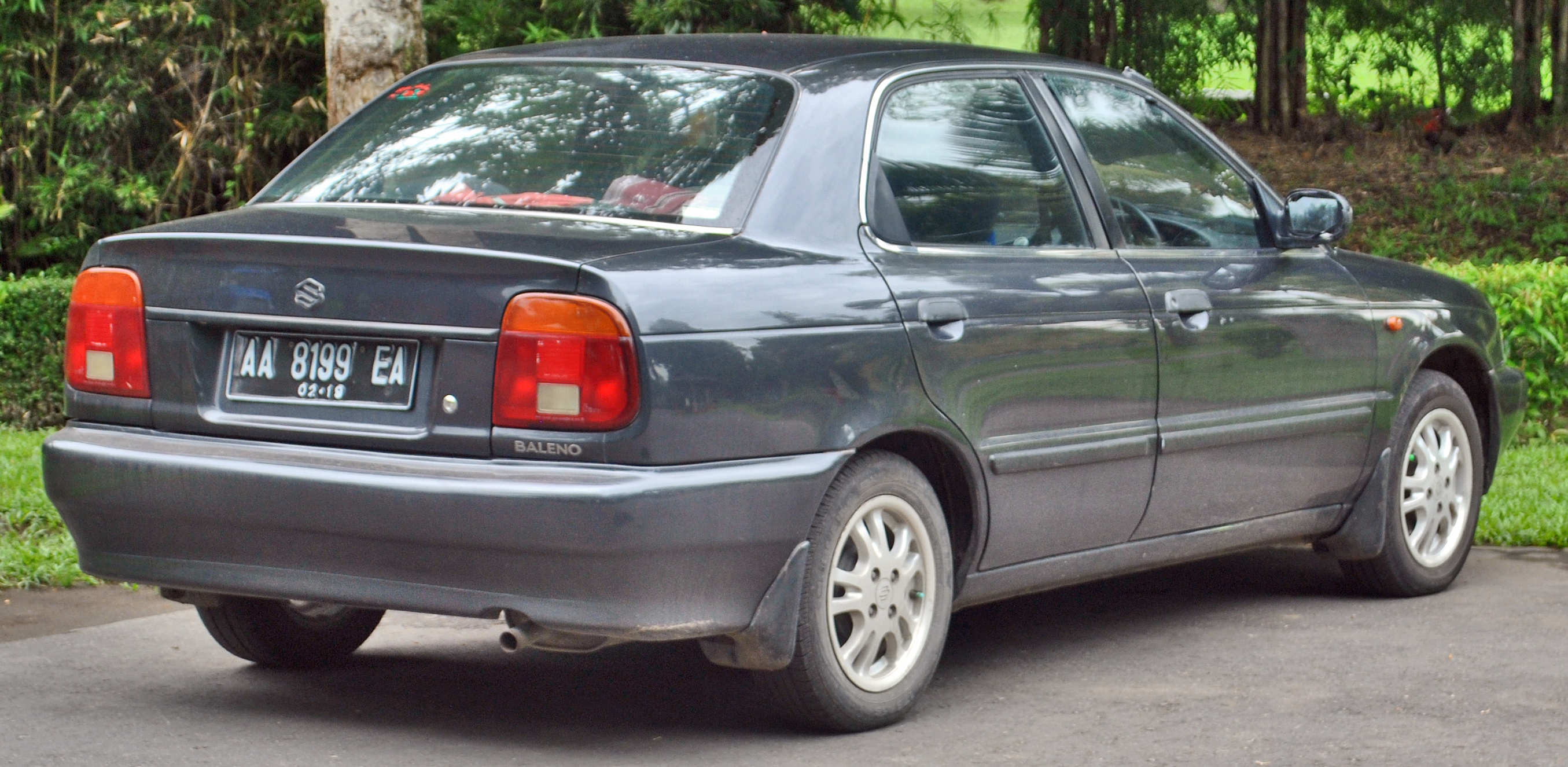
Suzuki Baleno sedan (Indonesia)

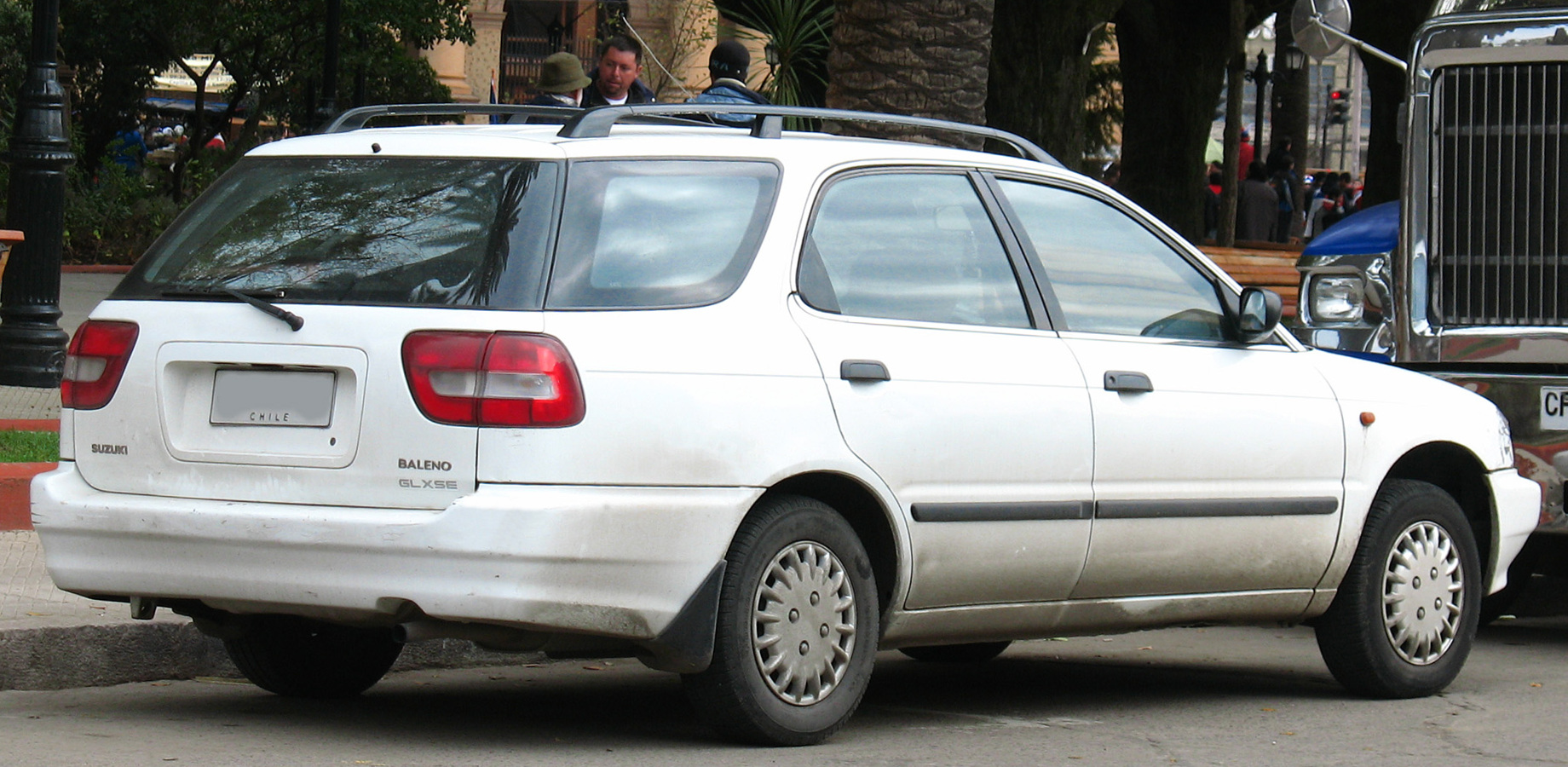
Suzuki Baleno wagon (Chile)

The Cultus Crescent was introduced in Japan in January 1995 and then to the global market in the first half of 1995. It was Suzuki's first attempt in the competitive compact segment. As a North American replacement for the Suzuki Cultus (Swift) sedan (the three-door hatchback remained after it was redesigned in 1995), it was built on a slightly stretched Cultus platform for improved cabin room, but otherwise sharing most of internal components with the smaller model—and marketed as a distinct model.

The Cultus Crescent was initially available as a three-door hatchback and four-door sedan, with the SOHC belt driven 16-valve G-family engines, in 1.3- and 1.5-litre form, with power ranging from 85 to 97 PS (84 to 96 hp; 63 to 71 kW). The 1.3-litre was only offered in the hatch while a 1.5-litre was only fitted to the sedan. Eventually, four-wheel drive was offered with the 1.6-litre variant in February 1996, basically the same engine as found in the Suzuki Escudo, with power raised to 115 PS (113 hp; 85 kW). At the same time, 1.8-litre DOHC chain driven 16-valve J18A engine with 135 PS (133 hp; 99 kW) appeared, the lineup was also extended with the wagon body style, called Cultus Crescent Wagon GT. This was Suzuki's first station wagon, excluding kei cars. The wagon was fitted with the same 1.6-litre engine as available in the sedans, and could also be equipped with the optional four-wheel drive.

In Europe, the 1.5-litre engine was not available for sale. The 1.8-litre engines was exclusively fitted to GTX sport model and was rated at 121 PS (119 hp; 89 kW) (EEC). A commercial van with higher roof was also available in several European countries.

The Cultus Crescent was also assembled in Colombia at GM Colmotores in 1995, marketed as Chevrolet Esteem and only available as sedan with 1.3-and 1.6-litre engines. Suzuki also produced this car locally in Indonesia, which was launched in July 1996 as replacement of previous Cultus sedan (marketed as Esteem there) and sold as Suzuki Baleno and only available as sedan with 118 PS (116 hp; 87 kW) 1.6-litre engine and 5-speed manual transmission. The Suzuki Esteem was introduced in the Philippines in 1996 and sold until 2000, and was only available as a wagon. Suzuki then dropped the "Esteem" name in favour of Chevrolet, who had just been returning in the Philippine-market to have at least one sedan model to compete with other popular Japanese-made sedans.

=== Facelift ===
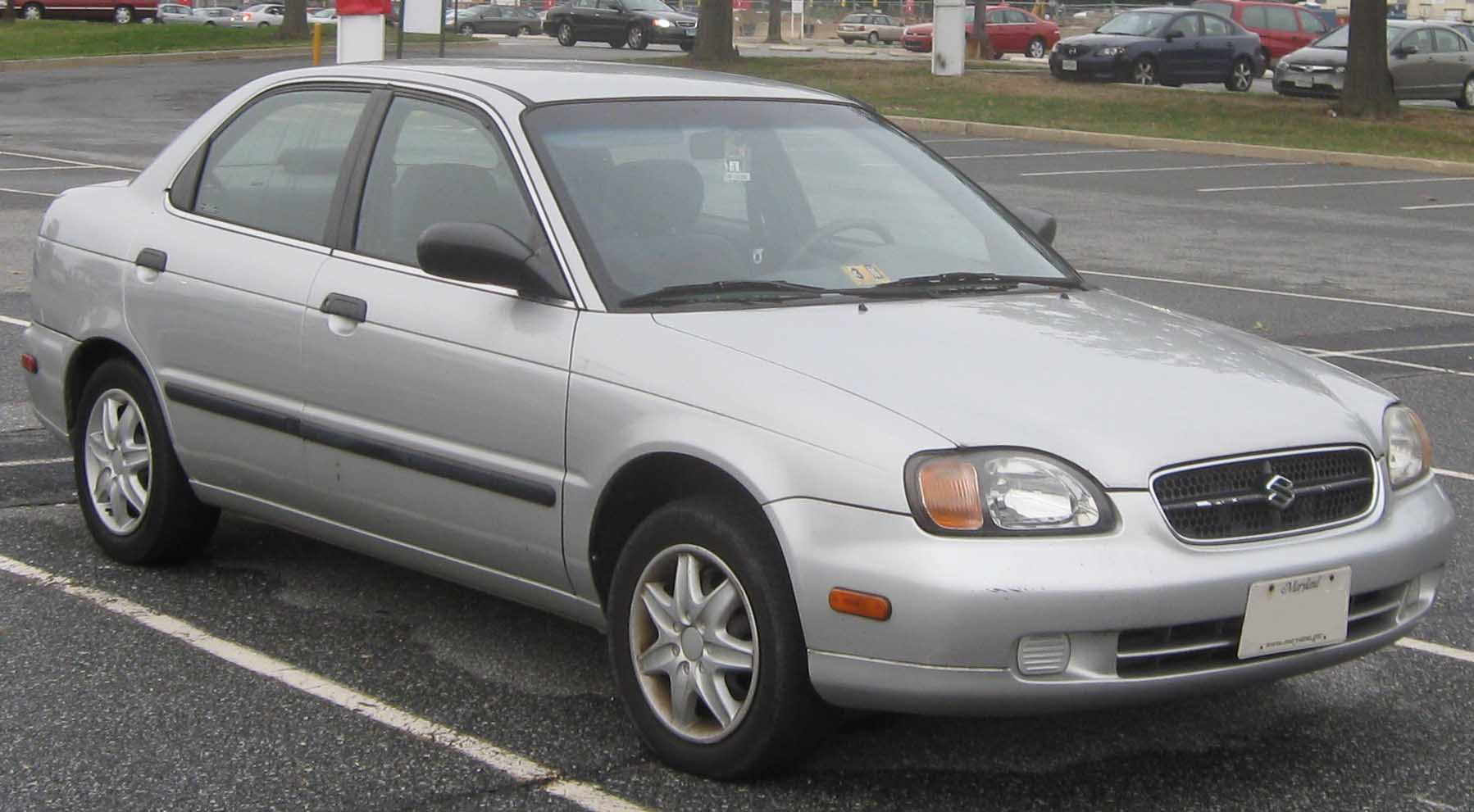
Suzuki Esteem sedan (first facelift, US)

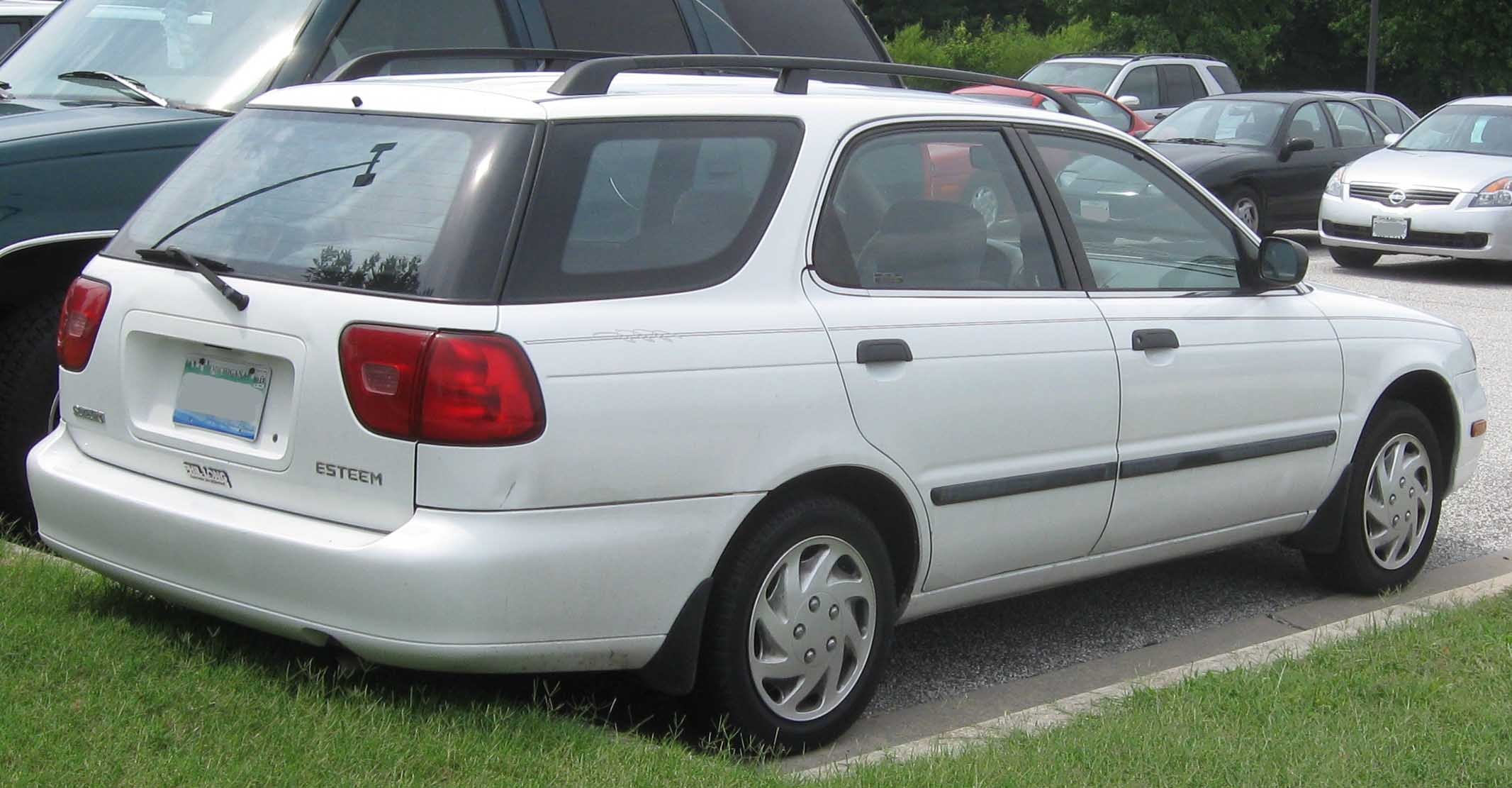
Suzuki Esteem wagon (first facelift, US), with North American specification tail lights

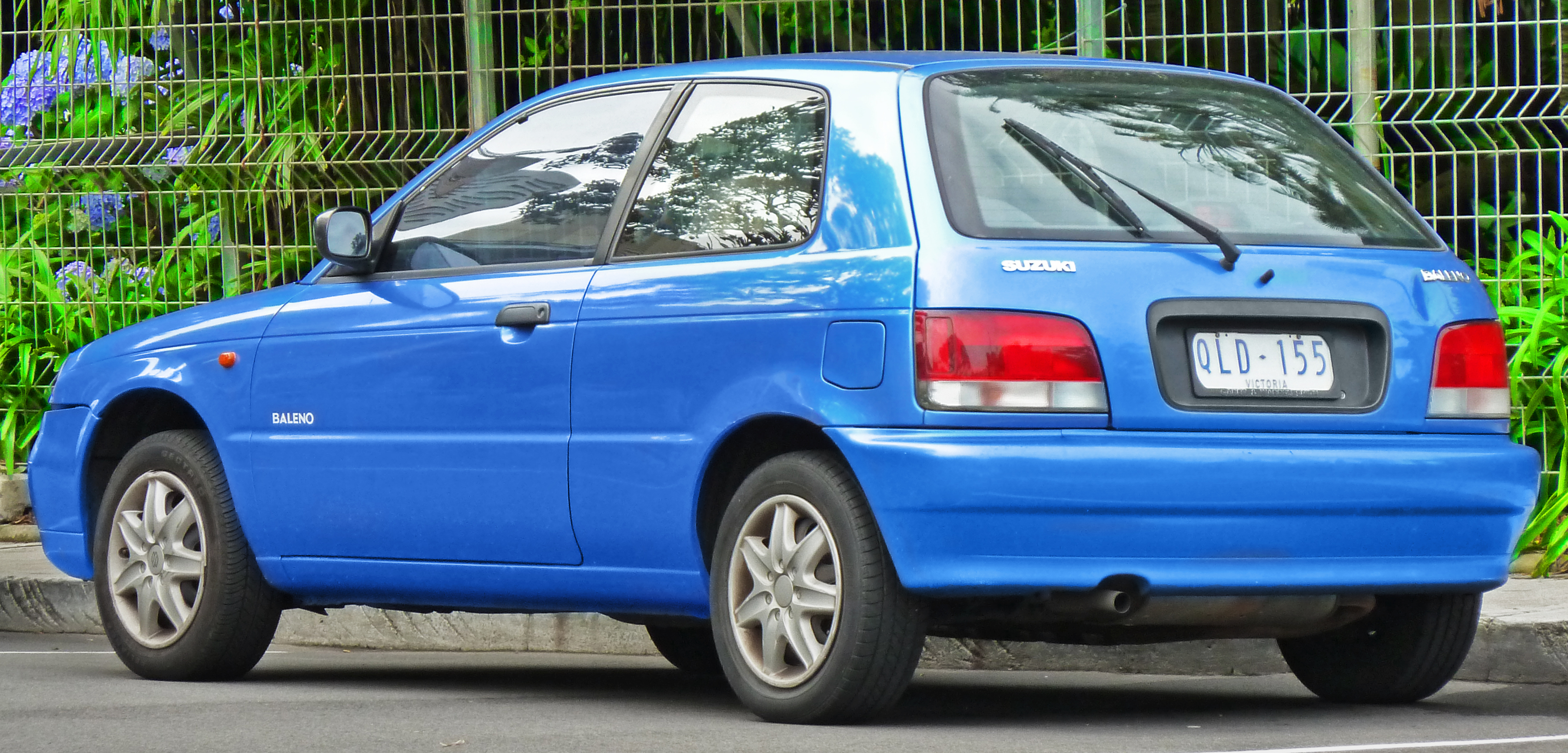
Suzuki Baleno hatchback (first facelift, Australia)

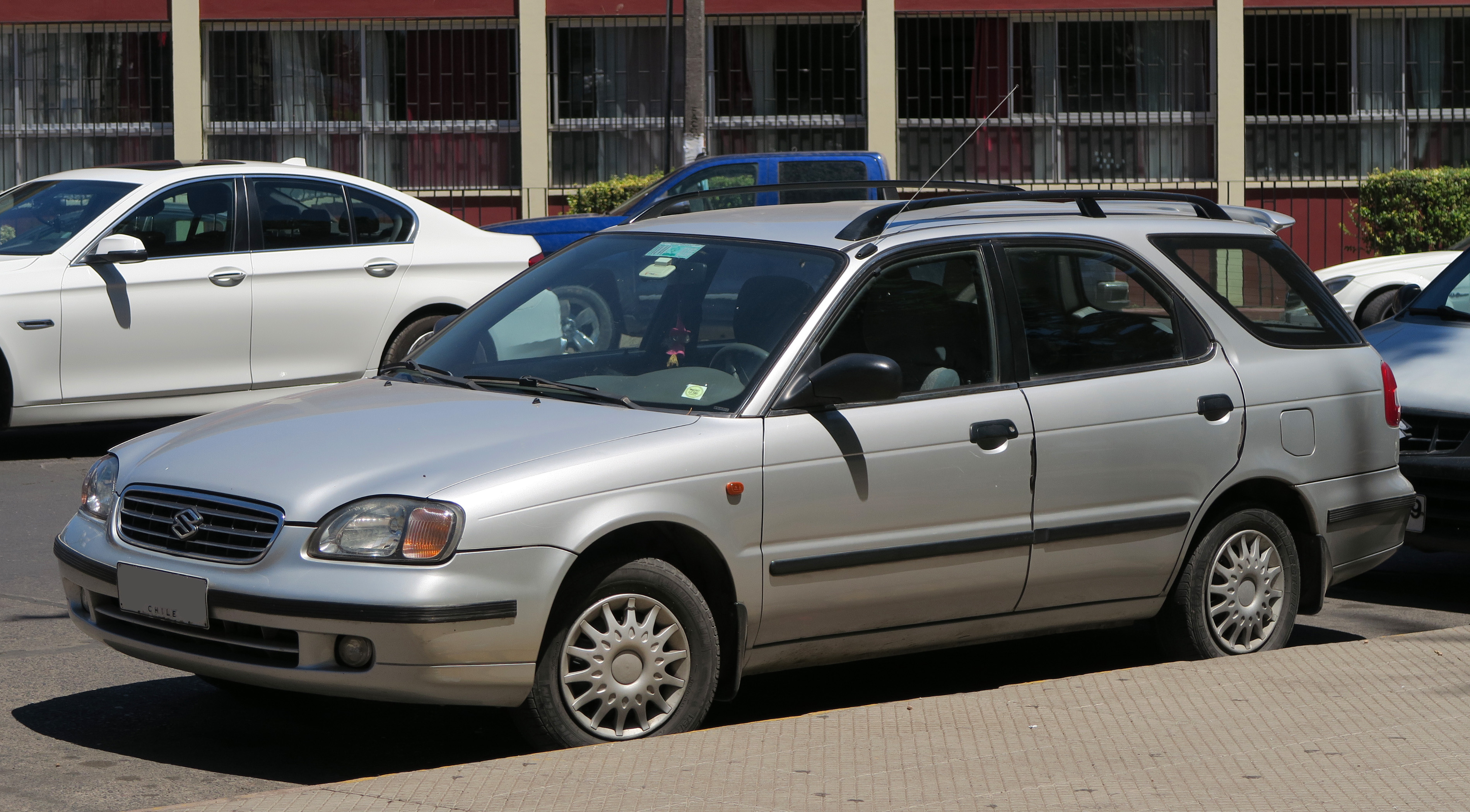
Suzuki Baleno wagon (second facelift, Chile)

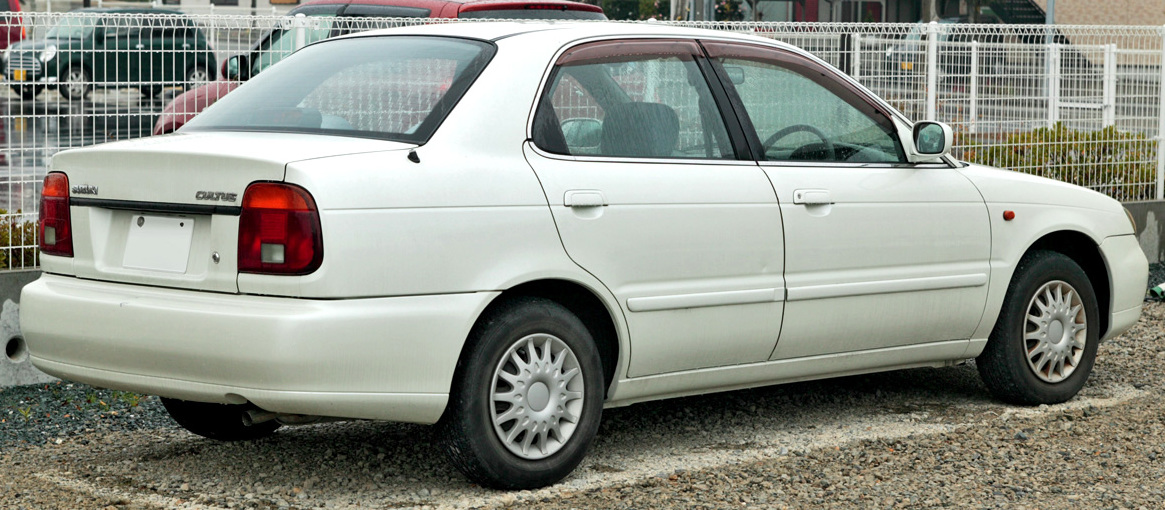
Suzuki Cultus sedan (Japan), the "Crescent" suffix was dropped for the facelift model

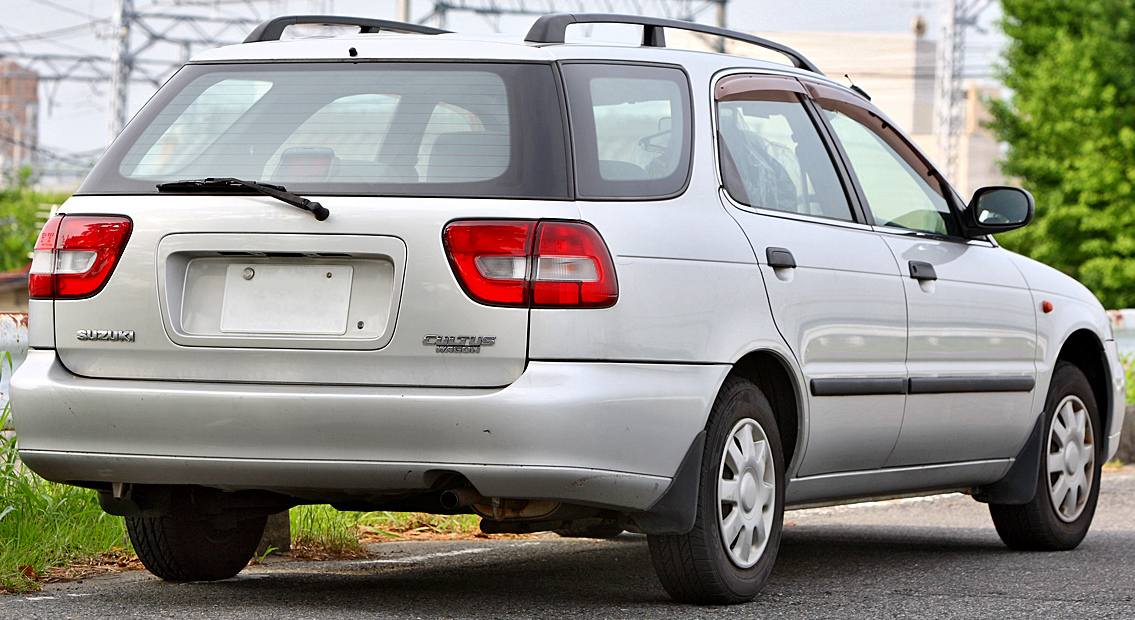
Suzuki Cultus Wagon (Japan)

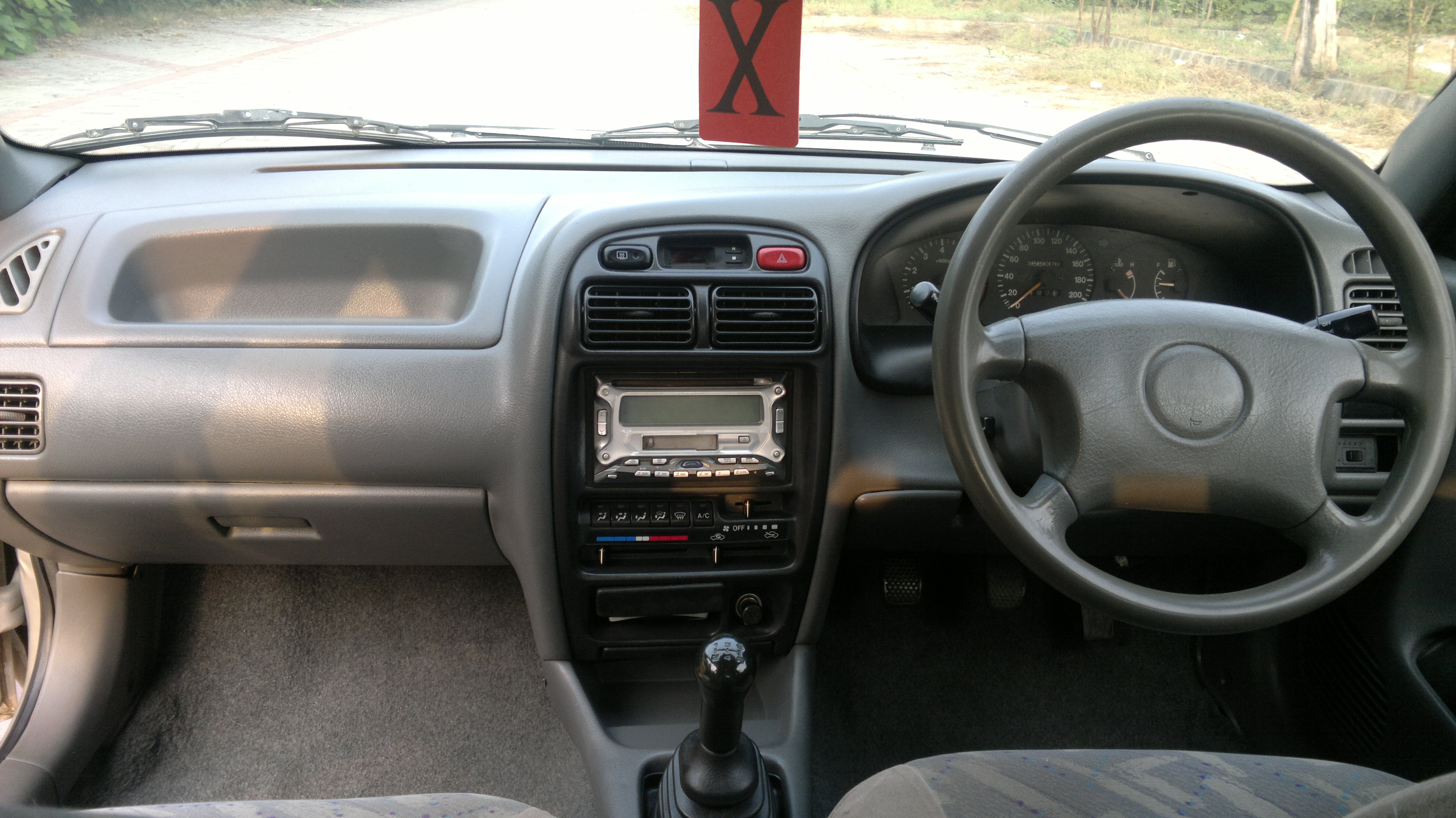
Suzuki Baleno interior (facelift; Pakistan)

Suzuki restyled the Cultus Crescent and renamed it Cultus (for the Japanese market only) in mid-1998. In this year, both India and Pakistan started producing Baleno in their countries. Unique for Pakistan, Baleno was produced with pre-facelift front end (but facelifted in 2002), only available as a sedan and powered with 1.3- and 1.6-litre petrol engines. While in India, the wagon body style also produced there and marketed as Baleno Altura and also the only country that produced Cultus wagon outside Japan. In North America, the changeover took place with the 1999 model year. The engine lineup was expanded to include Suzuki's J18A chain-driven DOHC engine that was fitted to the sedan and wagon. The Esteem 1.8-litre wagon completely replaced the Esteem 1.6, but in most markets the 1.8 sedan became the sports model. In some European markets, the 1.8-litre was installed in the hatchback and sold as the limited edition Baleno GSR. Europe also gained a turbodiesel version, with a SOHC belt driven 8-valve 75 PS (55 kW; 74 hp) XUD9 engine supplied by Peugeot.

In 1999, the Indonesian-market Baleno received a new 1.5-litre petrol engine, replacing the old 1.6-litre unit as the country imposed higher tax for cars with engine above 1.5 litres around this time. 4-speed automatic transmission was later added in 2000.

In the Philippines, the facelift model was introduced in 2000 as the Chevrolet Cassia. Suzuki chose to drop the Esteem in the market in favor of Chevrolet Philippines, who have been re-introduced at that time to have an entry-level sedan competing against other Japanese-made sedans. Chevrolet's first sedan to be offered in the country for a new decade was not a market success. The 1.6-litre SOHC 16-valve 4-cylinder which made 97 PS (96 hp; 71 kW) was the only engine choice offered and had fewer features than the rest of its rivals. Its main competitors were the Ford Lynx, Toyota Corolla, Honda Civic, Nissan Sentra, and the Mitsubishi Lancer. Due to poor sales, production ended in 2002, just 2 years after it was introduced. After its discontinuation, the car was replaced by the Chevrolet Optra.

A minor facelift appeared in 2001, with only changes on the front grille. For the Indonesian market, this facelift appeared with new, white-coloured rear blinkers and later arrived in India around 2006.

The Cultus was replaced in most markets by the new Aerio/Liana, which was launched in 2001. In Japan, the sedan was discontinued in November 2001, although the wagon remained until August 2002. The entire range was pulled from the market in Europe and North America in 2002, after one year of overlapping with the Aerio/Liana. The car remained available in many developing countries, including India and Southeast Asia, where it was sold until 2007, when production stopped at the Maruti factory, with the assembly line giving way to the SX4 sedan.

== In popular culture ==
A yellow Suzuki Esteem (with one red door) is used as Jimmy McGill's car in the AMC TV show Better Call Saul for most of the show.

== Motorsport ==
Suzuki Baleno regularly finished in the top five spots of A6 class, mostly in Rally New Zealand from 1997 to 2001. The Baleno also received a cult following in India among rally enthusiasts.

In 2000, Suzuki entered a heavy modified Suzuki Cultus sedan for competing in Pikes Peak International Hill Climb. It featured two turbocharged J20A inline-four engines, with a combined power output of 800 PS (588 kW; 789 hp) with 90 kg⋅m (883 N⋅m; 651 lb⋅ft) of torque. Driven by the previous year's runner up, Nobuhiro "Monster" Tajima, it failed to finish the race due an accident that wrecked the car.
