= Interference engine =

Type of internal combustion engine

An interference engine is a type of 4-stroke internal combustion piston engine in which one or more valves in the fully open position extends into any area through which the piston may travel. By contrast, in a non-interference engine, the piston does not travel into any area into which the valves open. Interference engines rely on timing gears, chains, or belts to prevent the piston from striking the valves by ensuring that the valves are closed when the piston is near top dead center. Interference engines are prevalent among modern production automobiles and many other four-stroke engine applications; the main advantage is that it allows engine designers to maximize the engine's compression ratio. However, such engines risk major internal damage if a piston strikes a valve due to failure of camshaft drive belts, drive chains, or drive gears.

== Timing gear failure ==
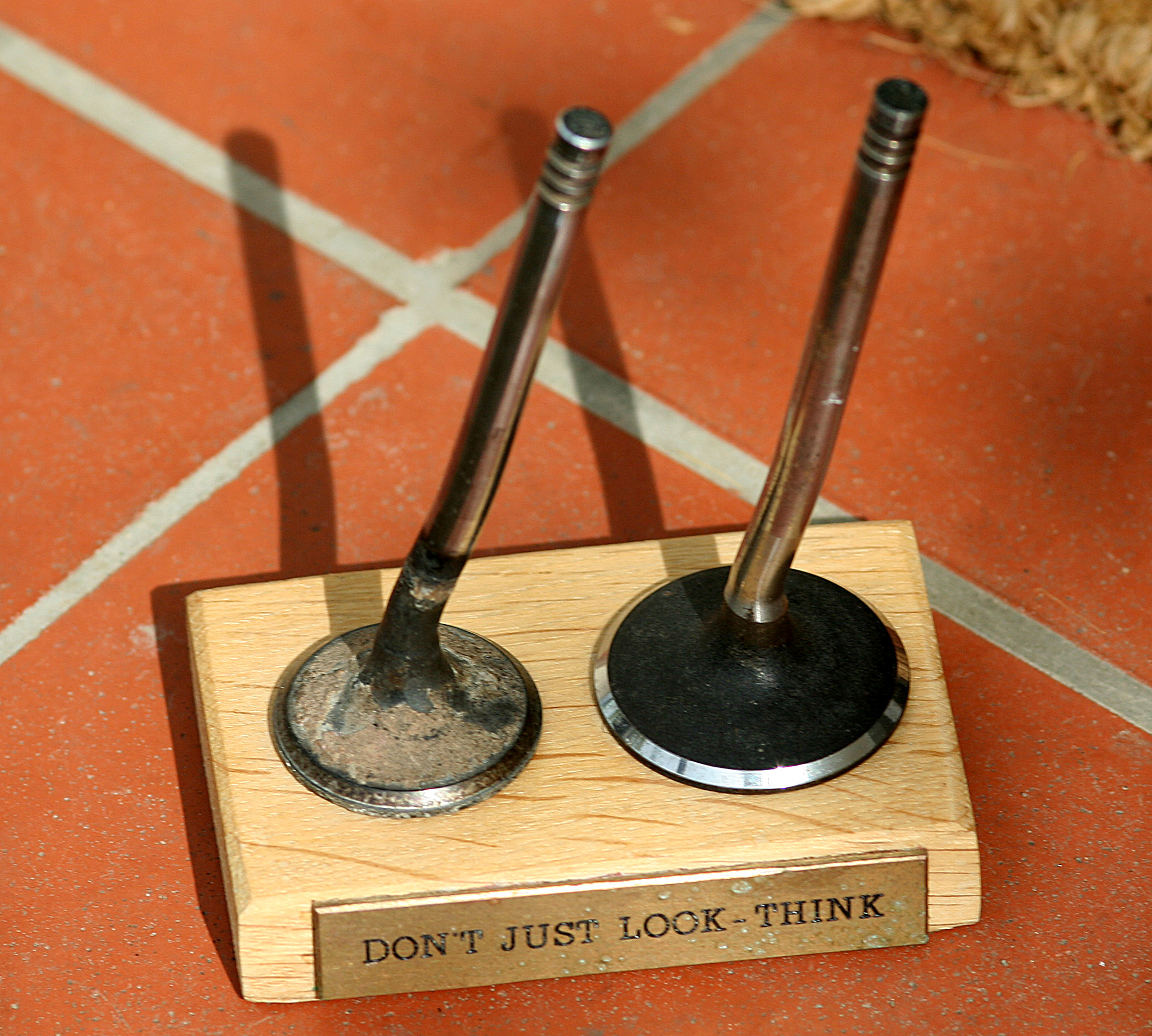
A pair of poppet valves bent by collision with a piston after timing belt failure. The engine was running at 4500 RPM.

In interference engine designs, replacing a timing belt in regular intervals (manufacturers recommend intervals ranging from 60,000 to 104,000 miles (97,000 to 167,000 km)) or repairing chain issues as soon as they are discovered is essential, as incorrect timing may result in the pistons and valves colliding and causing extensive internal engine damage. The piston will likely bend the valves, or, if a piece of valve or piston is broken off within the cylinder, the broken piece may cause severe damage within the cylinder, possibly affecting the connecting rods. If a timing belt or chain breaks in an interference engine, mechanics check for bent valves by performing a leak-down test of each cylinder or by checking the valve gaps. A very large valve gap points to a bent valve. Repair options depend on the extent of the damage. If the pistons and cylinders are damaged, the engine must be rebuilt or replaced. If the valves are bent but there is no other damage, replacing the bent valves, rebuilding the cylinder head, and replacing the timing belt/chain components may be sufficient.

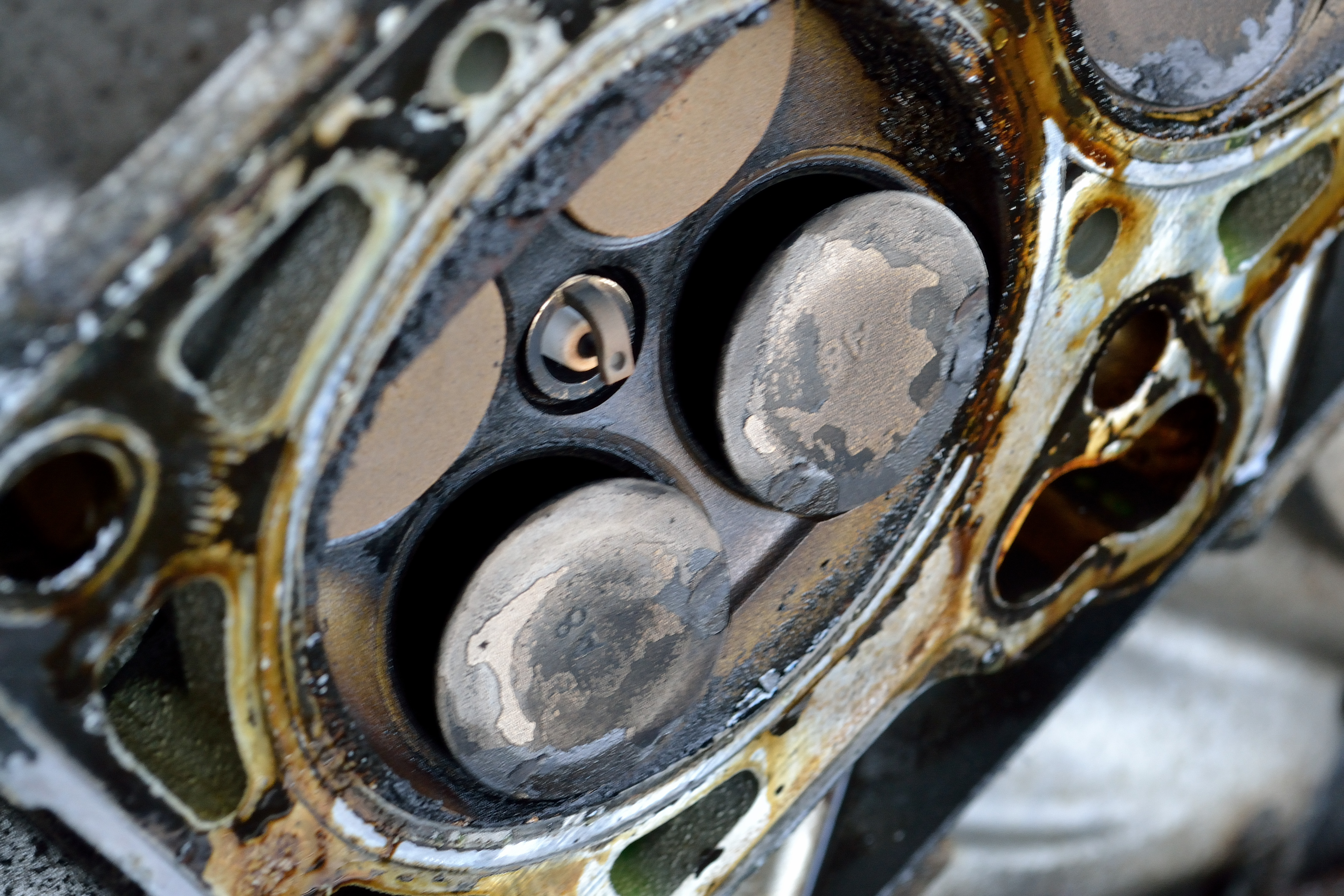
Intake valves bent during a timing belt failure incident
