= Suzuki Vitara =

Compact SUV produced by Suzuki

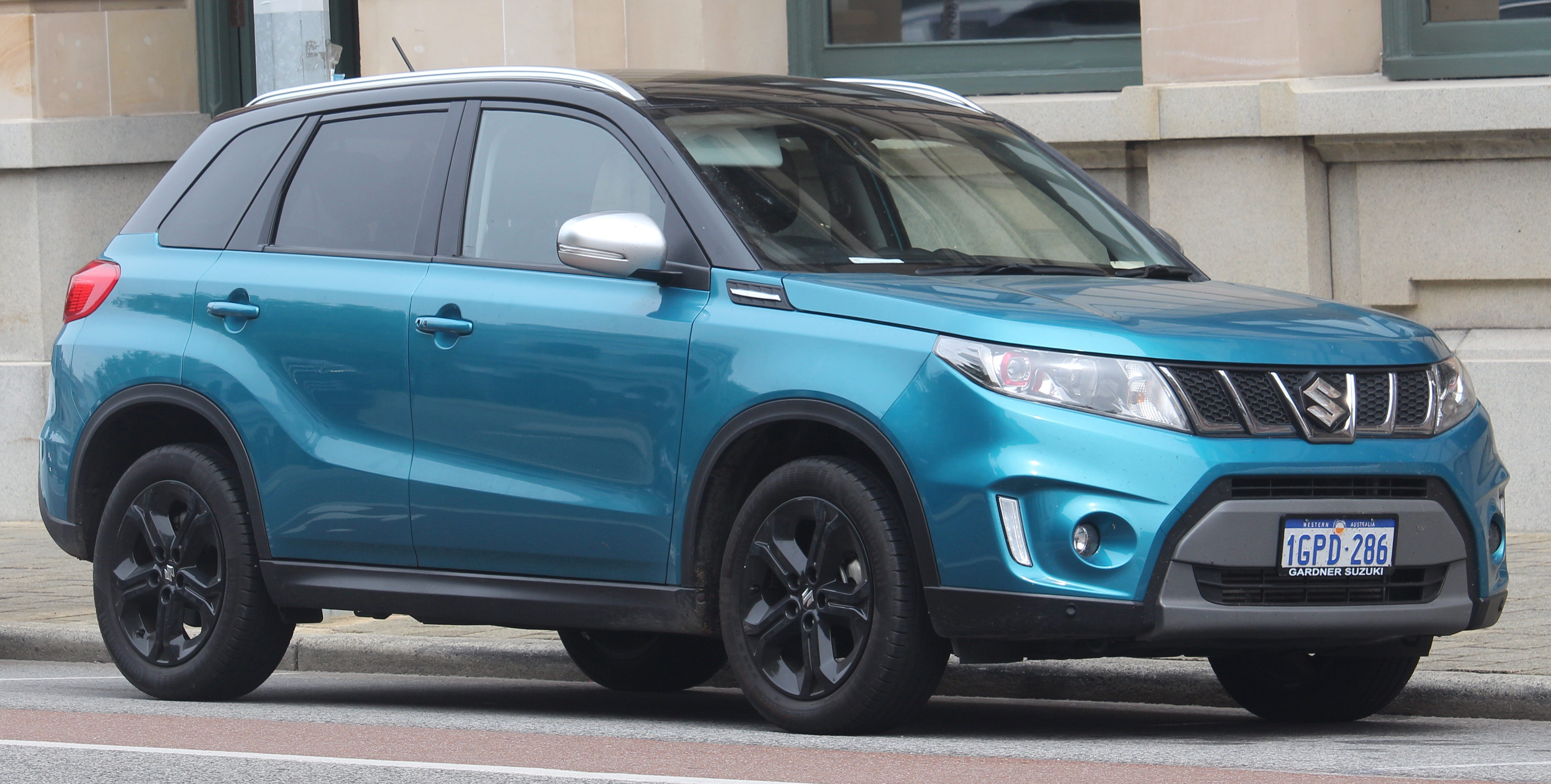

Overview
- Manufacturer: Suzuki
- Also called: Suzuki Escudo (1988–2024)
- Production: 1988–present

Body and chassis
- Class: Mini SUV (1988–2005); Compact SUV (1998–2017); Subcompact crossover SUV (2015–present)
- Layout: Front-engine, rear-wheel-drive (1988–2017); Front-engine, front-wheel-drive (2015–present); Front-engine, four-wheel-drive (1988–present)

The Suzuki Vitara is a series of SUVs produced by Suzuki in five generations since 1988. The second and third generation were known as the Suzuki Grand Vitara, while the fourth generation eschewed the "Grand" prefix. In Japan and a number of other markets, all generations have used the name Suzuki Escudo (Japanese: スズキ・エスクード, Hepburn: Suzuki Esukūdo) until 2024.

The choice of the name "Vitara" was inspired by the Latin word vita, as in the English word vitality. "Escudo", the name primarily used in the Japanese market, refers to the "escudo", the monetary unit of Portugal before adoption of the Euro. The original series was designed to fill the slot above the Suzuki Jimny. The first generation was known as Suzuki Sidekick in the United States. The North American version was produced as a joint venture between Suzuki and General Motors known as CAMI. It was also sold as the Santana 300 and 350 in Spain and in the Japanese market, and in select markets was rebadged as the Mazda Proceed Levante as well.

The second generation was launched in 1998 under the "Grand Vitara" badge in most markets. It was accompanied by a still larger SUV known as the Suzuki XL-7 (known as Grand Escudo in Japan). The third generation was launched in 2005.

The fourth generation, released in 2015, reverted to the original name "Vitara" in most markets, but shifted from an off-road SUV towards a more road-oriented crossover style. It shares the platform and many components with the slightly larger SX4 S-Cross.

The model introduced in 2022 for the Indian market only reuses the "Grand Vitara" nameplate. It is slightly larger than the SX4 S-Cross.

== First generation (ET/TA; 1988) ==
First generation
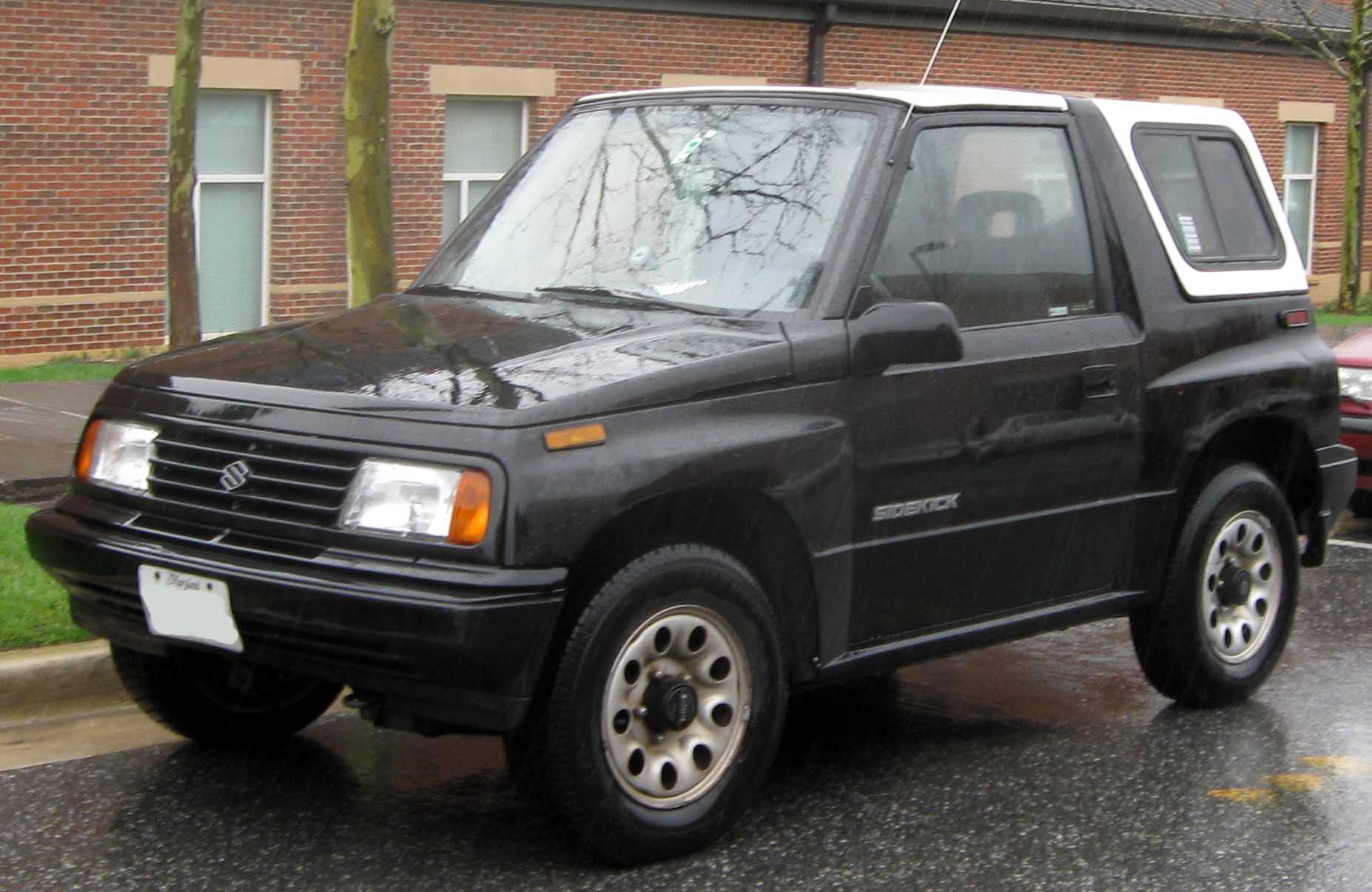
- Suzuki Sidekick 2-door resin top convertible (US; pre-facelift)

Overview
- Model code: ET; TA
- Also called: Suzuki Escudo (Japan/Indonesia/Philippines); Suzuki Sidekick (North America/Indonesia); Mazda Proceed Levante (Japan); Santana 300/350 (Europe/South America); Chevrolet Tracker; (United States/Canada); Geo Tracker (United States); GMC Tracker (Canada); Pontiac Sunrunner (Canada); Asüna Sunrunner (Canada); Wanli WLZ5020XLD (China); Guangtong GTQ5020XLZ (China); Chevrolet Vitara (Ecuador/Colombia/Venezuela); Sanjiu Vitara (China)
- Production: 1988–1998 (continued to be produced in Indonesia until 2001 and Spain until 2006)
- Model years: 1989–1999
- Assembly: Japan: Iwata, Shizuoka; Canada: Ingersoll, Ontario (CAMI Automotive); Indonesia: Bekasi, West Java (Suzuki Indomobil Motor); Spain: Linares, Andalusia (Santana Motor); Ecuador: Quito, Pichincha (GM Ecuador)

Body and chassis
- Class: Mini SUV
- Body style: 2-door convertible; 3-door panel van; 3 and 5-door SUV
- Layout: Front-engine, rear-wheel-drive; Front-engine, four-wheel-drive

Powertrain
- Engine: Petrol: 1.3 L G13BA I4; 1.6 L G16A I4; 1.6 L G16B I4; 1.8 L J18 I4; 2.0 L J20 I4; 2.0 L H20A V6; 2.5 L H25A V6; Diesel: 1.9 L PSA XUD9 TD I4; 2.0 L Mazda RF turbo-diesel I4; 2.0 L PSA DW10 HDi turbo-diesel I4
- Transmission: 5-speed manual; 3-speed TH180 automatic (1988–1990 1.6 L only); 4-speed Aisin 03-72LE automatic

Dimensions
- Wheelbase: 2/3-door: 2,200 mm (86.6 in); 5-door: 2,480 mm (97.6 in)
- Length: 2/3-door: 3,560–3,720 mm (140.2–146.5 in); 5-door: 3,975–4,200 mm (156.5–165.4 in)
- Width: Regular model: 1,635–1,655 mm (64.4–65.2 in); 5-door Nomade/Sport: 1,695 mm (66.7 in)
- Height: 2/3-door: 1,665–1,705 mm (65.6–67.1 in); 5-door: 1,700–1,725 mm (66.9–67.9 in)
- Curb weight: 2/3-door: 950–1,140 kg (2,094–2,513 lb); 5-door: 1,170–1,420 kg (2,579–3,131 lb)

The Suzuki Escudo was first introduced in the Japanese market in July 1988. The North American Sidekick became available for model year 1989 as a 2-door convertible or hardtop. A fuel-injected 1.6-litre, 8-valve, four-cylinder Suzuki G16A engine producing 81 PS (60 kW; 80 hp) was available on the JX and JLX trims. 1990 brought the deletion of the upscale JLX version. A carbureted version without a catalytic converter was available for some markets; this model produces 75 PS (55 kW) at 5250 rpm.

In August 1990, the Japanese market received a 16-valve G16B engine with 100 PS (73.5 kW) as well as an optional 4-speed automatic. At the same time, the commercial Van version was discontinued. Three months later a 5-door version with a lengthened wheelbase was introduced; it was sold as the "Escudo Nomade" in Japan. It was thought that the 5-door would overlap with the shorter 3-door in the market; instead, it appealed to a whole new segment and sales in the Japanese market doubled as a result. 1991 brought the introduction of rear anti-lock brakes. European deliveries of the five-door version began in the summer of 1991.

In December 1994, a 2.0-litre V6 (Suzuki's first six-cylinder) and a 2.0-litre Mazda-sourced turbodiesel were added; in return, Mazda got to sell the Escudo in the Japanese market as the Proceed Levante from 1995 to 1997. A diesel option arrived in Europe in early 1996. In 1996, the Vitara received a facelift. Along with the cosmetic changes, the V6 was upsized to 2.5 litres while a 2.0-litre four-cylinder was slotted into the range.

In Japan, the "Nomade" tag was dropped from the five-door Escudos in October 1996. Also for the 1996 model year, Suzuki introduced the Suzuki X-90, which was mechanically identical to the Vitara but had a much rounder, two-seater body with a separate boot and removable T-bar roof. The Suzuki X-90 disappeared from Suzuki's lineup after the 1998 model year. The Vitara Sport variant was replaced by the Grand Vitara in 1999.

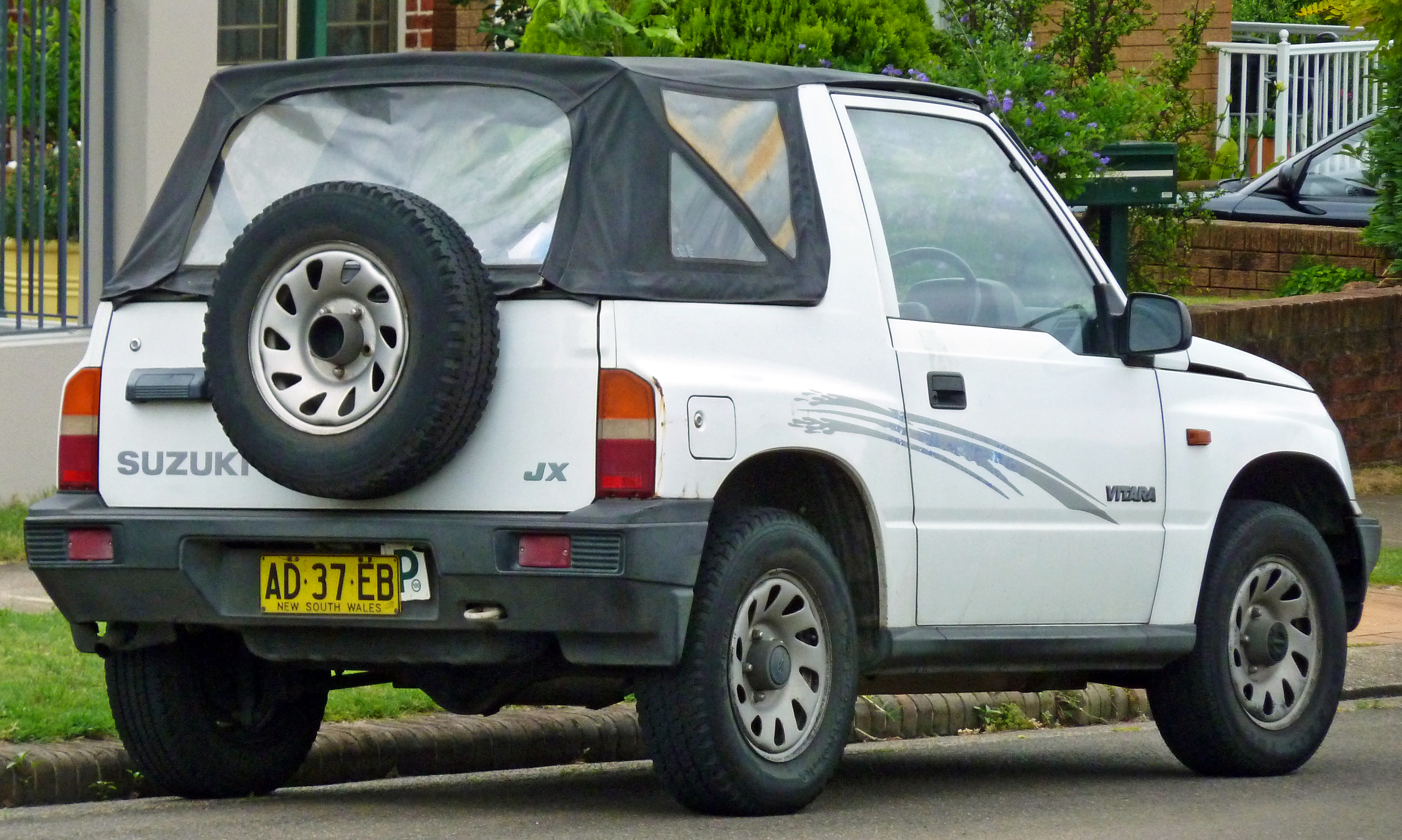
Suzuki Vitara JX 2-door soft top convertible (Australia; pre-facelift)

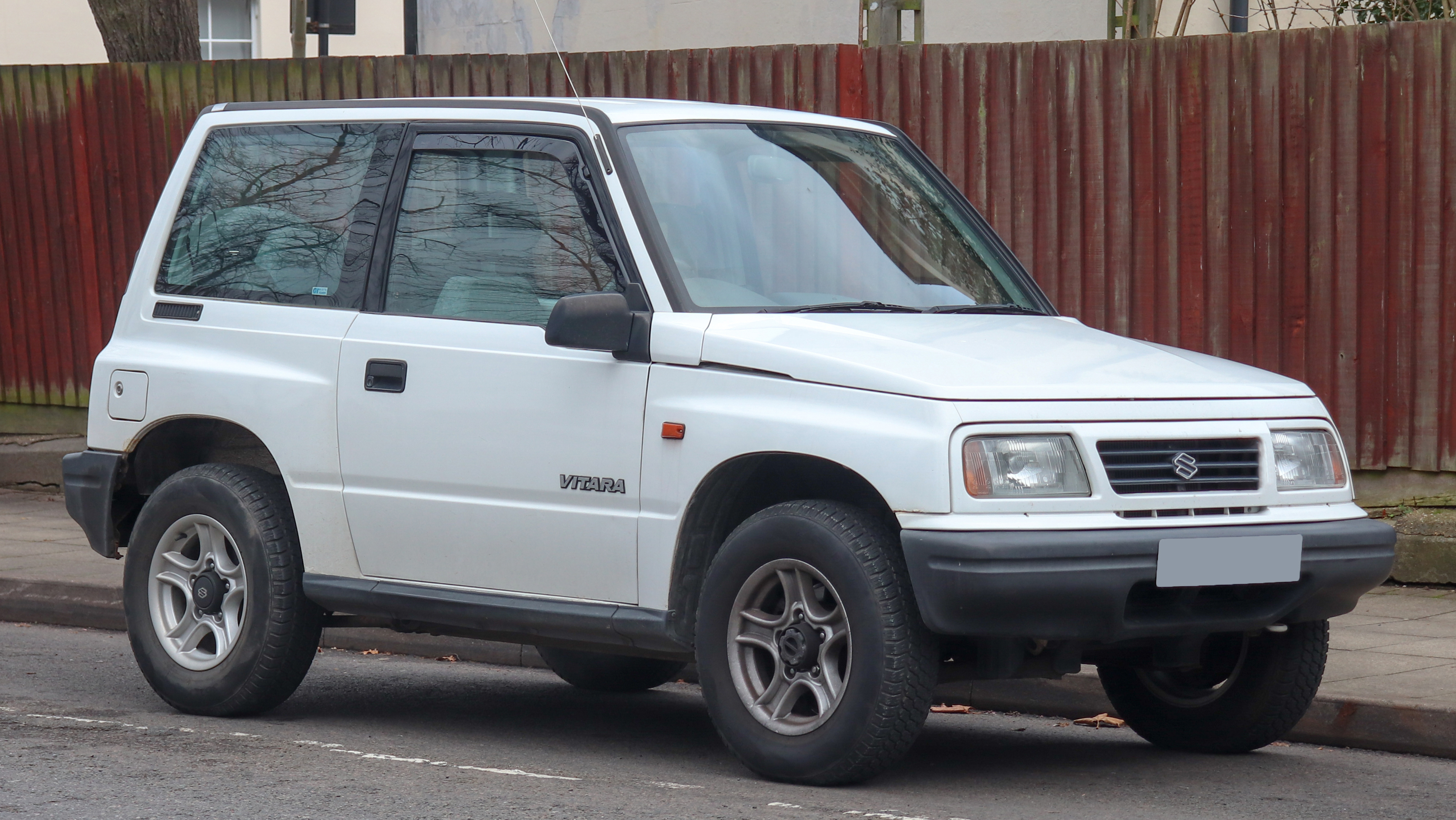
Suzuki Vitara JX 3-door hardtop (UK; facelift)

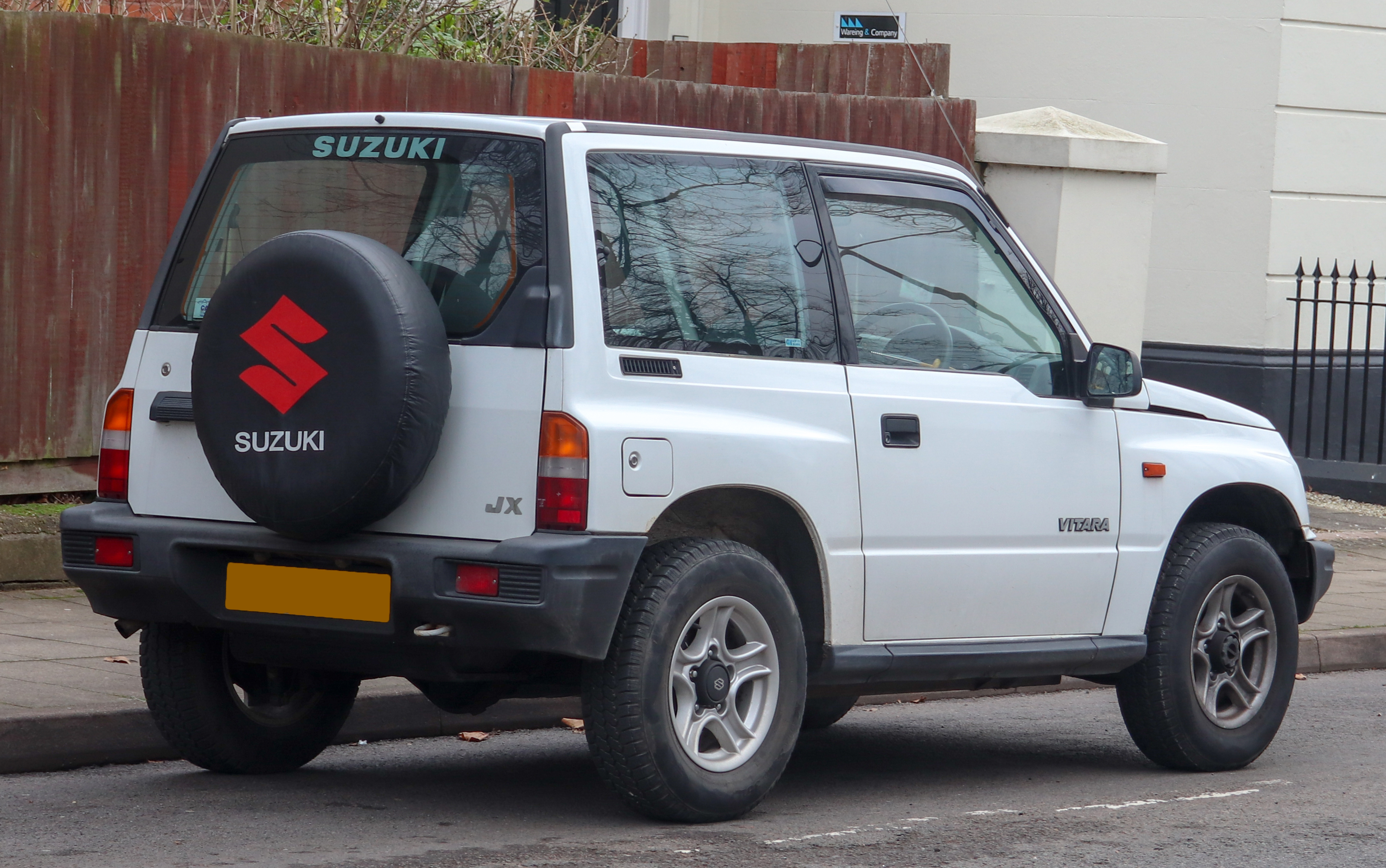
Suzuki Vitara JX 3-door hardtop (UK; facelift)

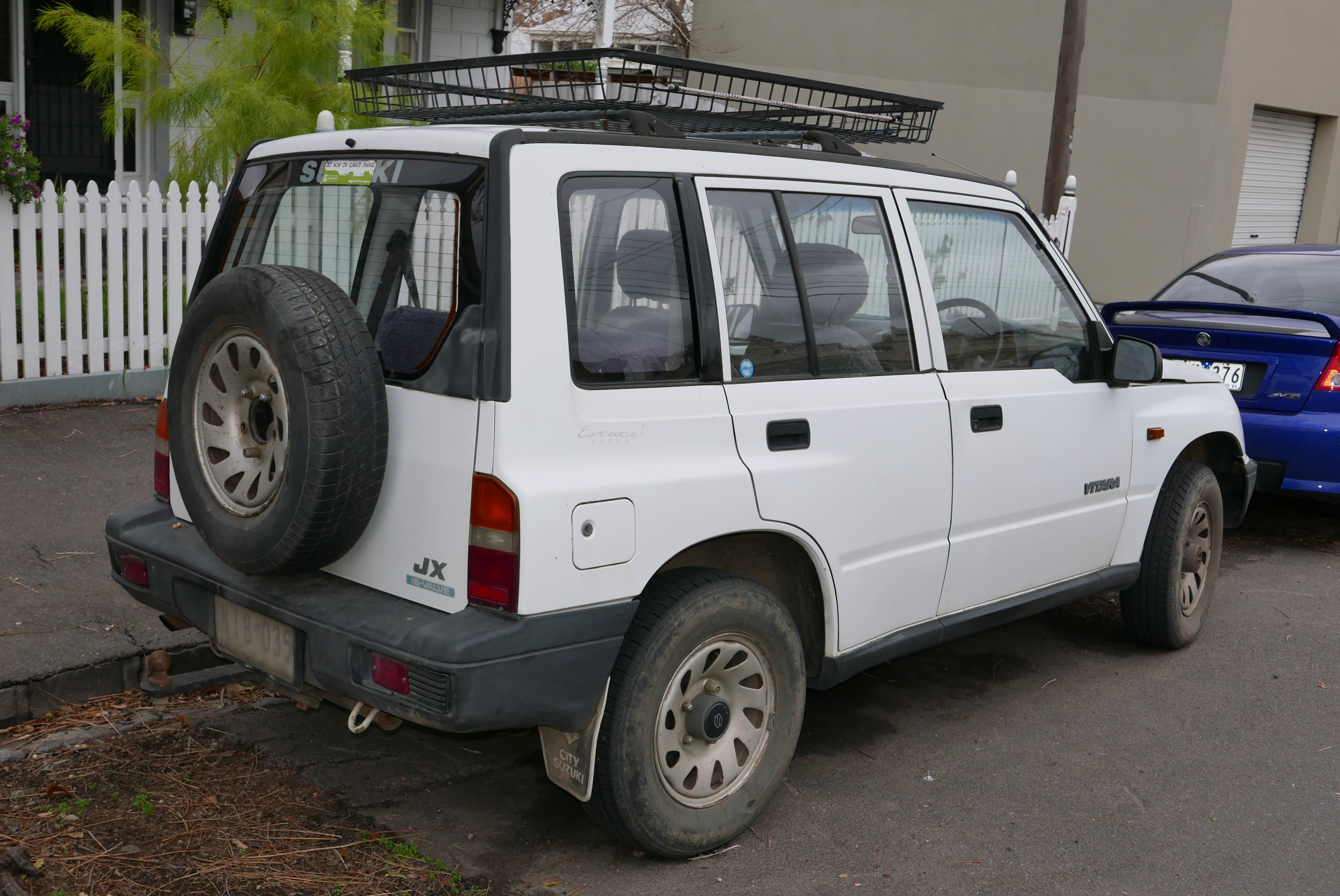
Suzuki Vitara JX 5-door (Australia; facelift)

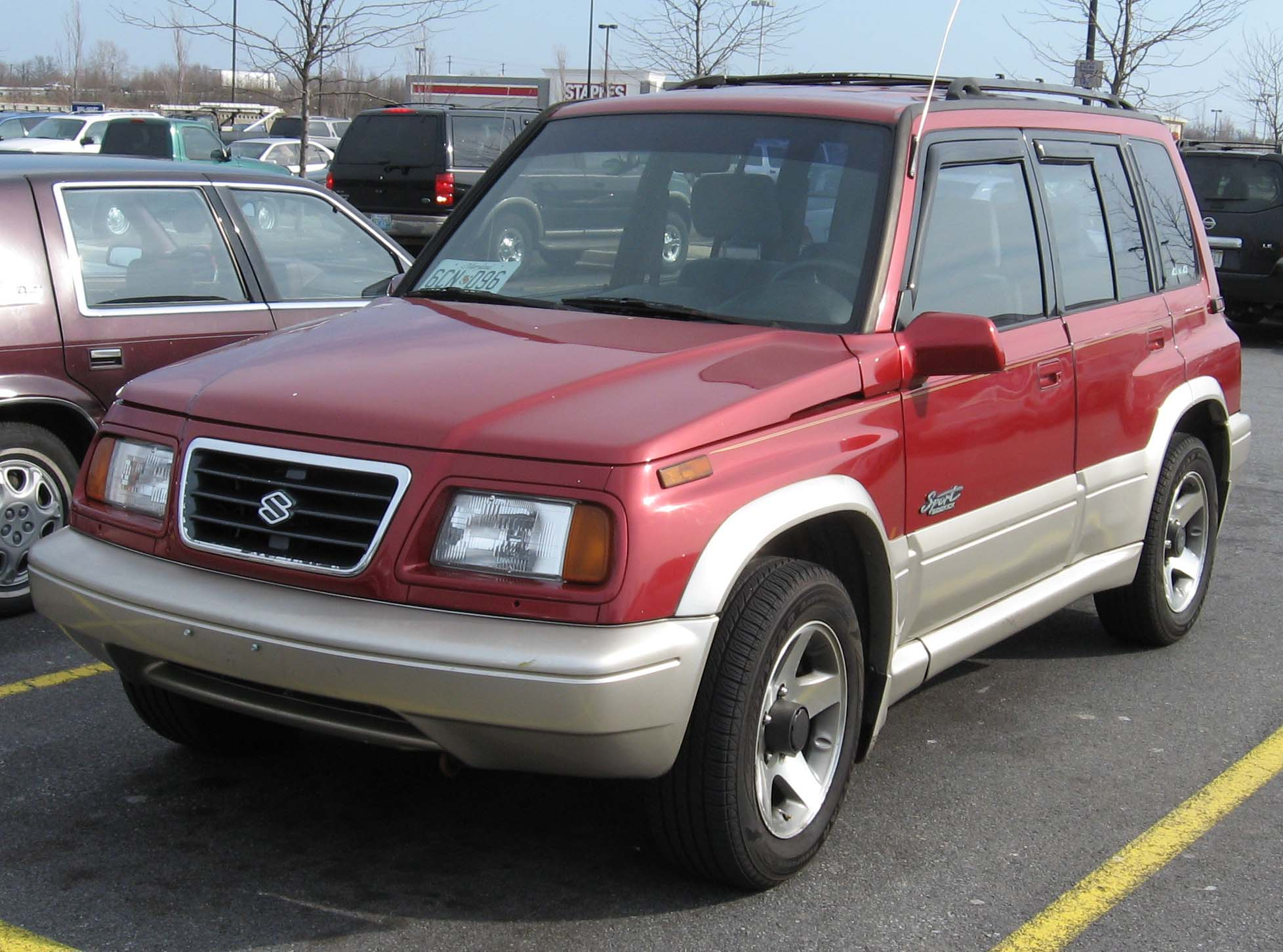
Suzuki Vitara with longer bumpers, wheel arches, side body mouldings, and larger grille. This model is known as Escudo V6 in Japan, Sidekick Sport in North America or Vitara V6/TD elsewhere.

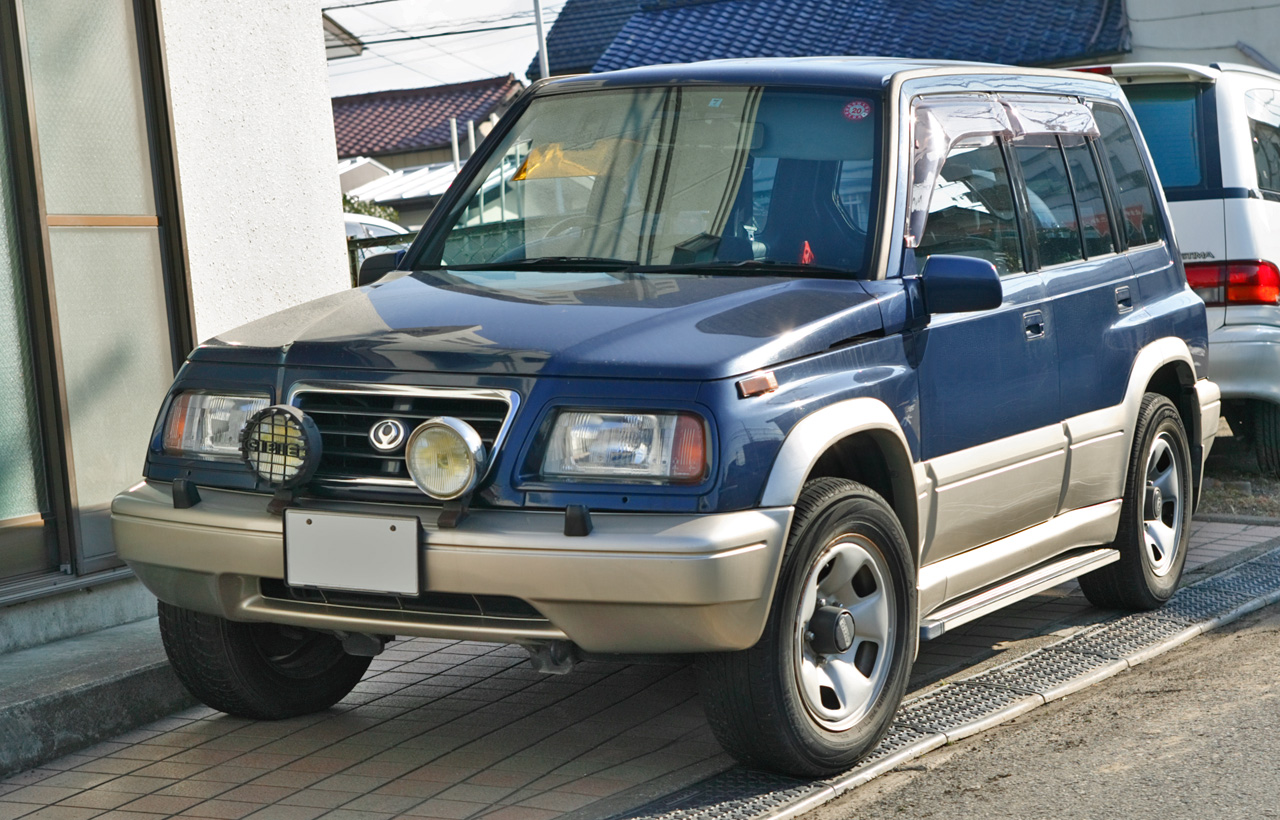
Mazda Proceed Levante (Japan)

=== Foreign markets ===
==== North America ====
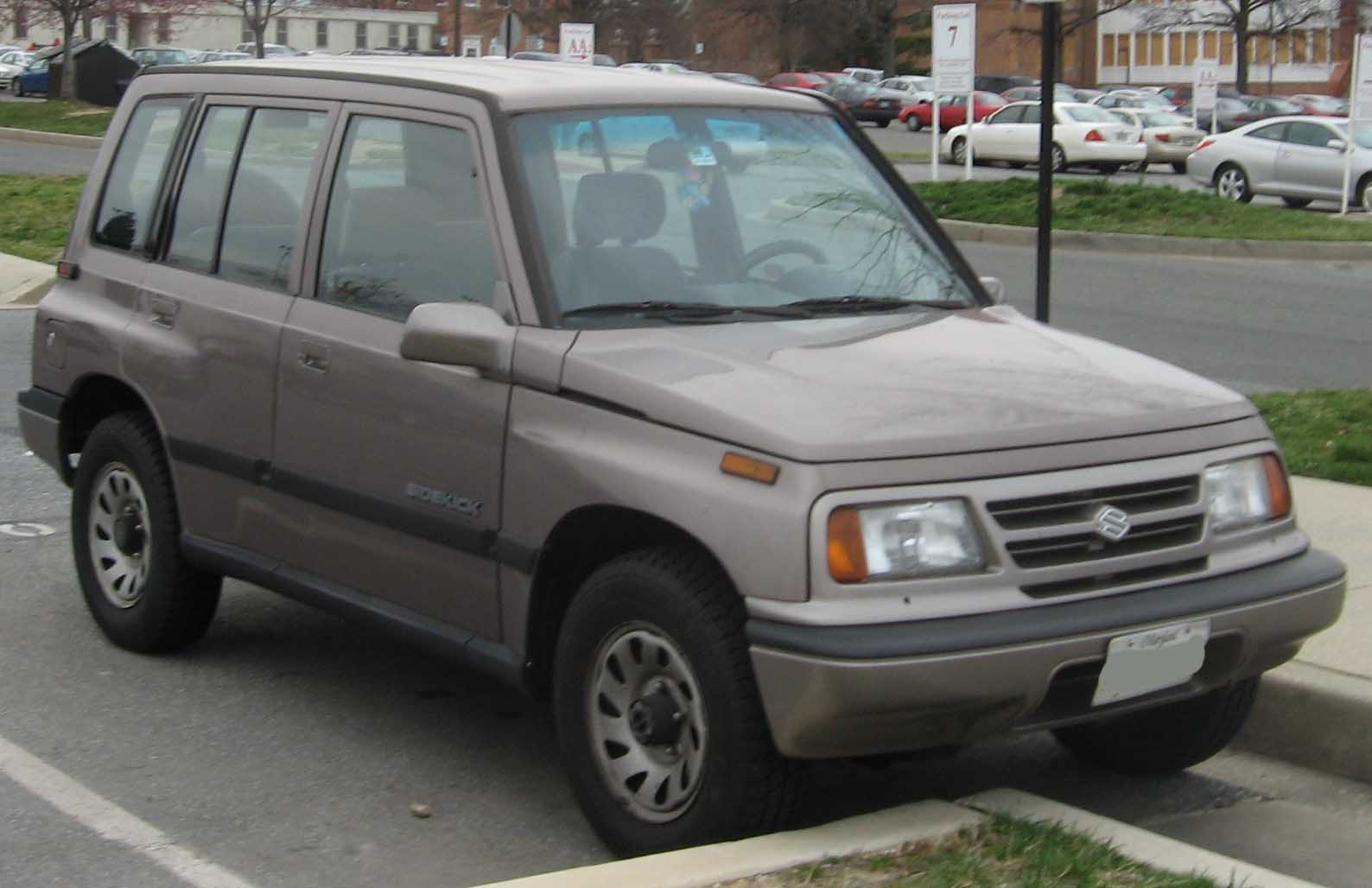
1996–1998 model of North American Suzuki Sidekick 5-door

When introduced in 1988, the Sidekick was available with three trim levels (JA, JX and JLX) and two engines (1.3-litre 8-valve Suzuki G13BA engine 64 hp (48 kW) and 1.6-litre 8-valve Suzuki G16A engine 80 hp (60 kW)). The 1.3-litre engine was only available in JA trim with 2-door convertible body style. For the 1992 model year a 95 hp (71 kW), 1.6-litre, 16-valve Suzuki G16B engine was introduced to the United States. The original Sidekick was updated in 1996 with a new Sport version available with 120 hp (89 kW), 1.8-litre 16-valve four-cylinder Suzuki J18 engine. The Sport also had dual airbags, two-tone paint and 16-inch alloy wheels. 1993 brought an update of the dash in conjunction with the exterior.

==== Australia ====
In Australia, there were two models available. The Vitara JX and the Vitara JLX. The JLX offered powered windows and body-coloured bumpers. Both versions featured the 1.6-litre engine: G16A (carburettor) in the 2-door, G16B (SOHC EFI) in the 4-door, introduced 1992, 2-doors got G16B from 1994. In May 1997, Suzuki introduced the 1995 cc J20 2.0-litre 16-valve DOHC engine with both soft top and hardtop three-door models. This engine was rated at 97 kW (130 hp) at 6300 rpm. At the same time the 5-door models received the 1998 cc H20A 2.0-litre V6. Engine power rated for the five-door V6 models was at 100 kW (134 hp) at 6500 rpm. Some of the 1.6-litre variant for the 3-door models were named the Suzuki Vitara Rebel. Many paint or trim or sticker-variants appeared as marketing exercises during the model's run in Australia. All models in Australia were sold as four-wheel drives. Early 3-door automatics featured a 3-speed transmission, this was a GM sourced TH180 which was used in Holden Kingswoods and early Commodores and was said to not be robust as the later Suzuki-built 4-speed electronic overdrive auto transmission. The rear diff on the 1st series Vitara was colloquially-known as "the Japanese 9-inch" as it was a very strong diff and hard to damage, even with oversized tyres. The front diffs were less strong, those with the aluminium-cased housing the weakest. The front diff with steel housing was not as widely available but is sought after by modifiers.

==== Indonesia ====
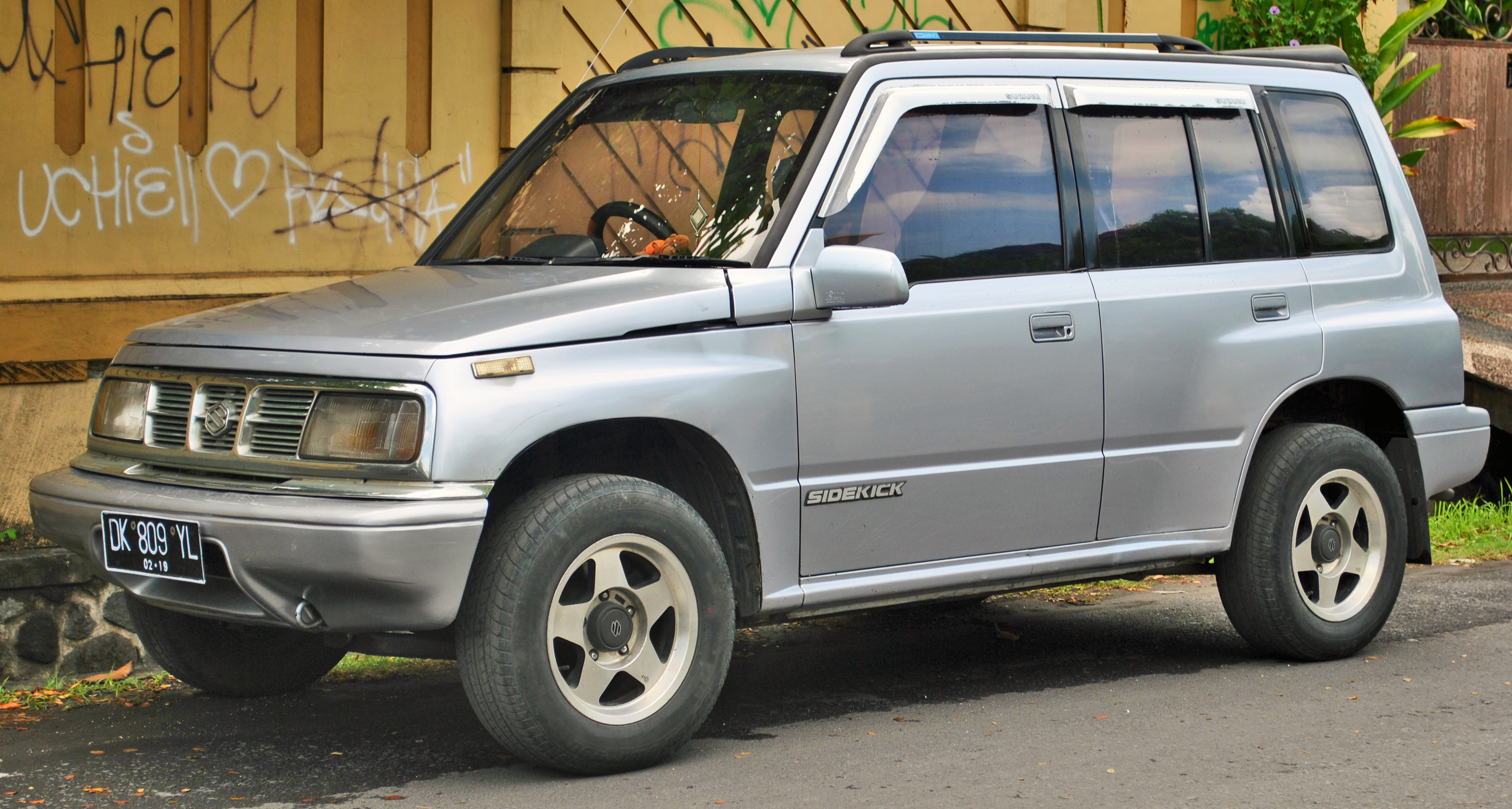

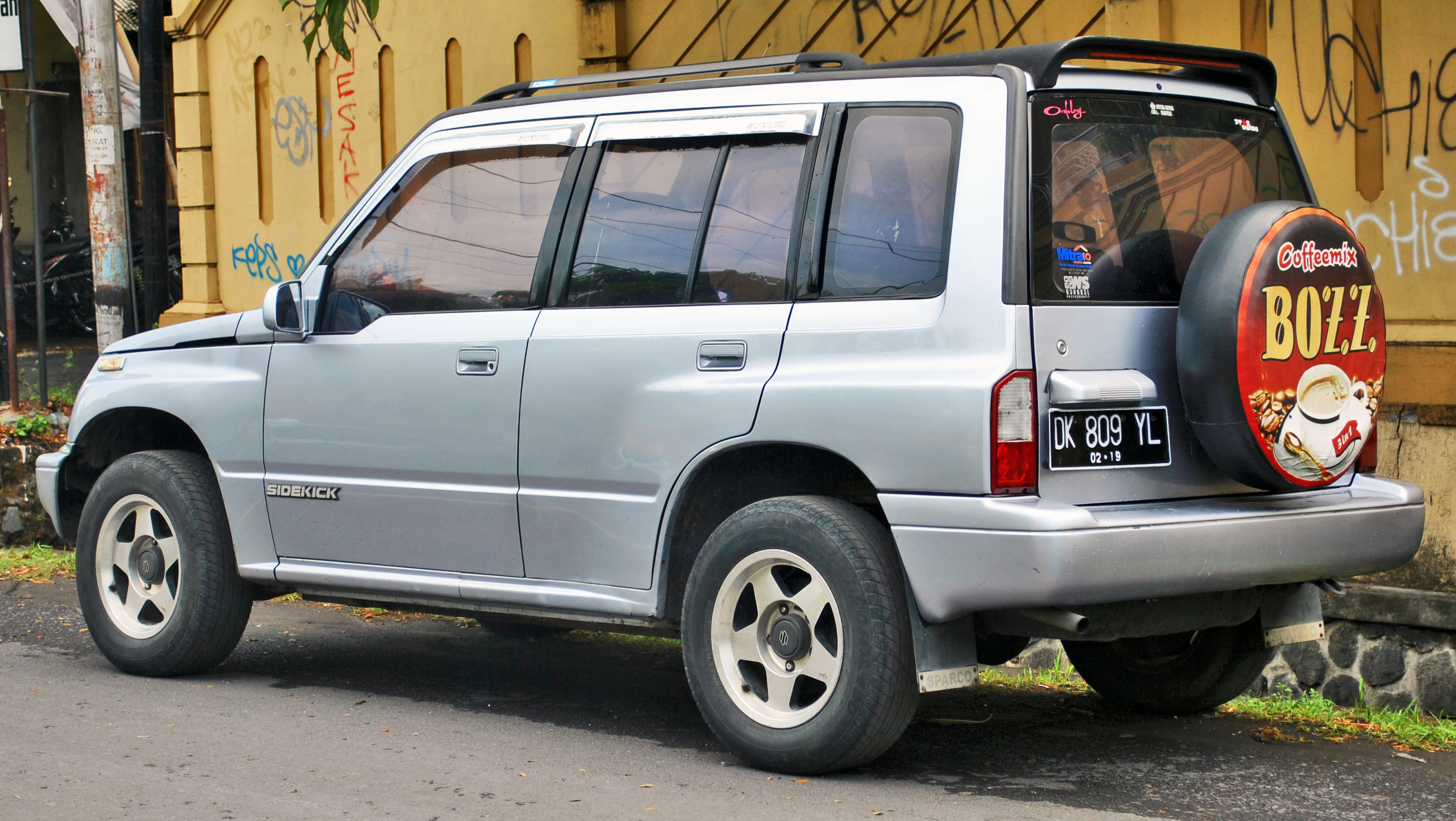
Facelifted Indonesian-built Suzuki Sidekick with different grille and aftermarket tail lights.

In Indonesia, Suzuki only sold the 5-door model under three different nameplates. It was first introduced as the Vitara in August 1992. Suzuki launched a two-wheel drive version labelled as the Escudo in late 1993 to target urban-driver market and to avoid higher taxes on four-wheel-drive vehicles, while the four-wheel-drive Vitara with 1.6-litre 8-valve G16A carburetor engine remained available until May 1994. The Escudo sales began in early 1994. Both the Vitara and Escudo initially came with the single JLX variant, and appeared with 16-inch steel wheels similar to the Suzuki Katana GX but with silver finishings instead of white. Updates and improvements on the Escudo were available in March 1995, such as three-spoke alloy wheel with dark grey and chrome finishings, redesigned four-spoke steering wheel with Suzuki's S logo, new seat upholstery, and updated colour options (green metallic and dark purple metallic were available by March 1995).

In April 1995, Suzuki introduced the Sidekick, a lower specification version of the Escudo, as the entry-level model. The Sidekick has no power window and other luxuries installed on the Escudo, and appeared with steel wheels similar to the earliest Escudo. The Sidekick also has redesigned steering wheel with Suzuki S logo, similar to the Escudo.

In early 1995, the Vitara received a 1.6-litre 16-valve G16B engine with fuel-injection system and was marketed as Vitara EPI (Electronic Petrol Injection). However, due to the much higher price that the earlier Vitara, the Vitara EPI sold poorly, discontinued in late 1995. Minor facelifts became available in July 1996, when the Escudo/Sidekick got a new interior with rounded dashboard and meter cluster, new front grille, and two-tone colour options on JLX trim. The JLX trim was replaced by Escudo Nomade variant in August 1997, it initially came with two-tone colour but returned to single-tone body colour in 1999. At the same period, the 1.6-litre 16-valve G16B engine was introduced for Escudo/Sidekick range, but still with carburettor.

Another special variant called Sidekick Drag One was introduced in 1996, followed by Sidekick X Pro and Sidekick cruiser in 1997, this variant was placed between the basic Sidekick and Escudo. Both the Escudo Nomade and the Sidekick was available until the launch of Grand Escudo (full model change) in June 2001.

==== Europe ====
The Vitara was an immediate success across Europe. Italy had enacted a law which allowed off-road vehicles to bypass EEC quotas on Japanese imports, allowing the Vitara to be sold there without limits. In 1988, however, as a direct response to the considerable sales of the Vitara, Italy's Ministry of Foreign Commerce enacted a law requiring "at least one differential lock" for a vehicle to be considered an off-roader - a requirement it did not meet. Thus, from 1 January 1989 the Vitara became subject to the quota in the Italian market as well, as it was now classified as a passenger car. In early 1996 European markets began receiving a diesel model.

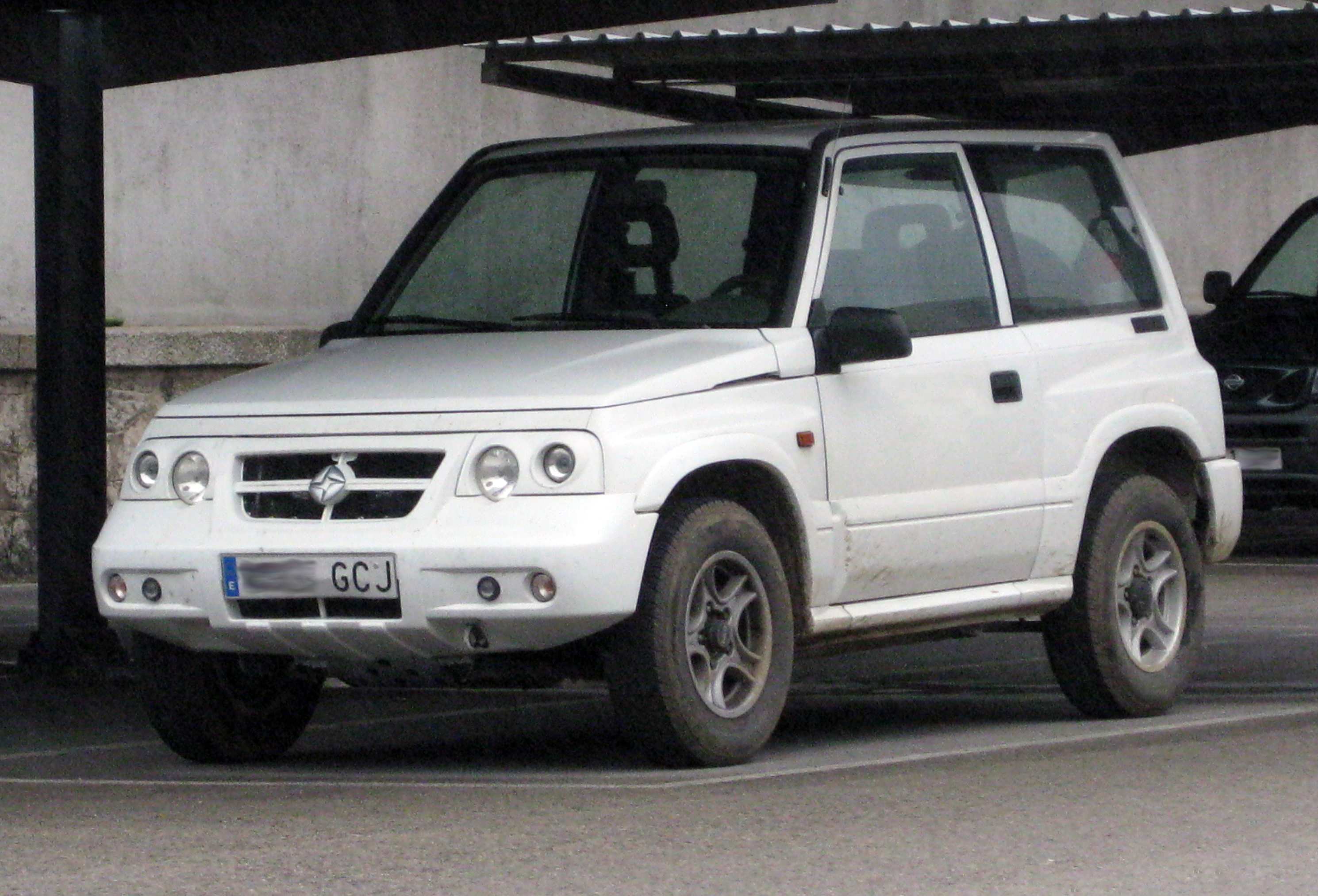
Santana 300 3-door hardtop (Spain)

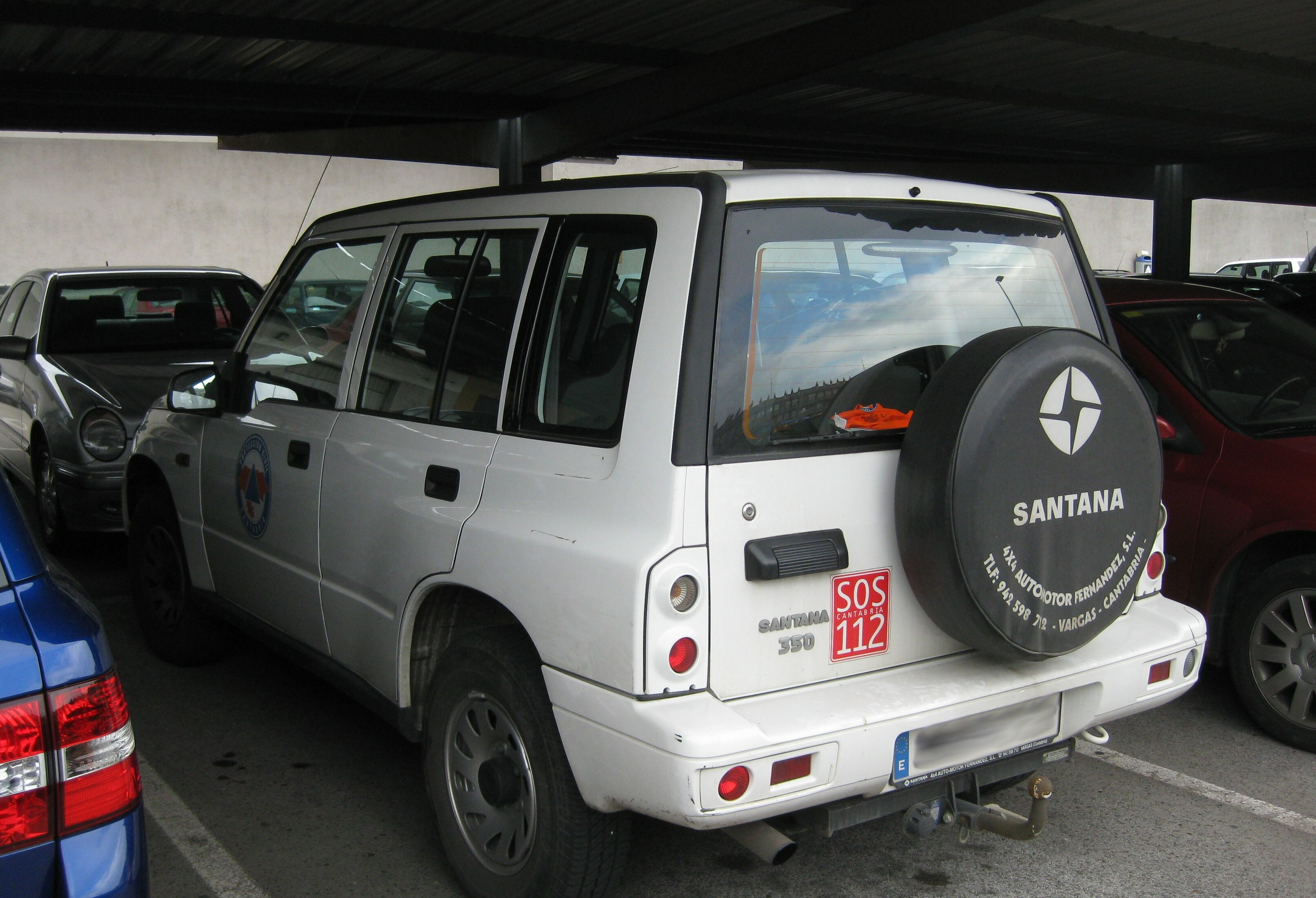
Santana 350 5-door (Spain)

Santana Motor built these vehicles and sold them both as the Santana 300/350 and as the Suzuki Vitara, to circumvent the EEC quota on Japanese imports. The 300 and 350 have round headlights and taillights, and is the only version of the car to have fog lights fitted in the front bumper from factory. The Spanish-built Vitara models, on the other hand, look nearly identical to the Japanese-built models, sporting a Suzuki logo in the grille. Steel and paint quality is different between the Spanish and Japanese-built models, both commonly found throughout Europe. Therefore, the Spanish-built Vitaras and 300/350s are more prone to rusting in northern European climates than Japanese-built counterparts of the same age and mileage. In addition, these vehicles had less insulation than the Japanese ones since they were built for warmer climates. Some of these have also been exported to South America. Some of the notable differences between the Japanese and Spanish models are different wheels, different paint schemes and details, different side plastic trim, interior details on the Spanish ones in fake wood, and the VIN code letters - Santana-built examples have chassis numbers that begin with "VSE".

In the United Kingdom, two additional body kit models were offered. Some two-door models were sold with an OEM body kit called Wideboy, which had wider wheel arches, sidesteps and 8 inch wide alloy wheels. The Fatboy was also a popular bodykit conversion, offered by the company Suzi Qs, located in Oldbury, Birmingham, UK. The Fatboy converted models had different trim levels, where most sported Cooper Cobra tires, 10 inch wide alloy wheels, different taillights integrated into the rear bumper, in addition to extra styling options like mud flaps, sidesteps, an A-shaped bullbar and auxiliary high beam lights.

The Suzuki Vitara Commercial was available in the UK. It was a Santana-built 3-door tintop Vitara panel van, with no rear windows. The Vitara Commercial had the JX 1.9 TD trim level, and sported a Peugeot XUD9 1.9-litre diesel engine. In 1999, the 1.9-litre diesel engine was replaced by more modern 2.0-litre DW10 HDi turbodiesel engine.

In Norway, a modified version of the 5-door version with a taller glass fibre roof were sold with green van registration plates to bypass some tax laws. These models had no rear seats and a grille separating the front seats and the rear compartment. In addition, these had longitudinal roof rails and special custom made, removable transverse roof bars. Normal roof racks intended to be mounted in the raingutters do fit on the longitudinal rails, but do stand taller than normal raingutter mounted ones. Many of these were later converted to 5-seat passenger cars with normal white registration plates. All Vitaras sold in Norway (and other Scandinavian countries) were modified to have the low beams automatically turn on with the engine running, similarly to DRLs on the CAMI versions of the car.

Another modified version of the 5-door was available in the Netherlands. It was a van similarly to the Norwegian one, but had a different glass fibre roof replacement.

Official production for this generation ended in 2006 with the end of the Santana 300/350.

There is also a very limited edition named Vitara Philippe Cousteaux which came in metallic pink or cyan with cream leather interior, wooden steering wheel, new wheels, bullbar and several other changes. Only 500 of this model were produced for European market. There are also similar limited editions for British market, but called Rossini (pink) and Verdi (cyan) with different wheels. These limited editions are only available in 2-door body style with a 1.6-litre 8-valve petrol engine.

==== China ====
This generation was not sold in China, however there were two versions of this car sold illegally as Wanli WLZ5020XLD and Guangtong GTQ5020XLZ. During the 1990s, the government of Guandong province created a loophole by allowing grey market goods importer companies to bring the car as knock-down kit to be assembled in China and avoiding the 60-80% import tax for full car. The China government only allows manufacturers to assemble the cars in China with at least 60% local components via official 50:50 joint venture. However, the government of Guangdong province allowed these importers to import cars without tires, mirror and door handles and then reassemble these cars in Guangdong and cut the import tax only to 25%. These companies then making business agreement to get the license from the government approved local car manufacturers for using their brands for selling these Vitaras.

This was barely concealed smuggling and led the government to arresting more than 200 government, customs and law enforcement officials in the southern Guangdong area around Zhanjiang on September 8, 1998. This affair was known as "9898 smuggling case", the largest mainland smuggling racket of the last 50 years. The state's lost revenue was estimated around ¥30 billion from the illegal import of thousands of tonnes of crude oil, steel, cars and other manufactured goods.

== Second generation (FT/GT; 1997) ==
Second generation
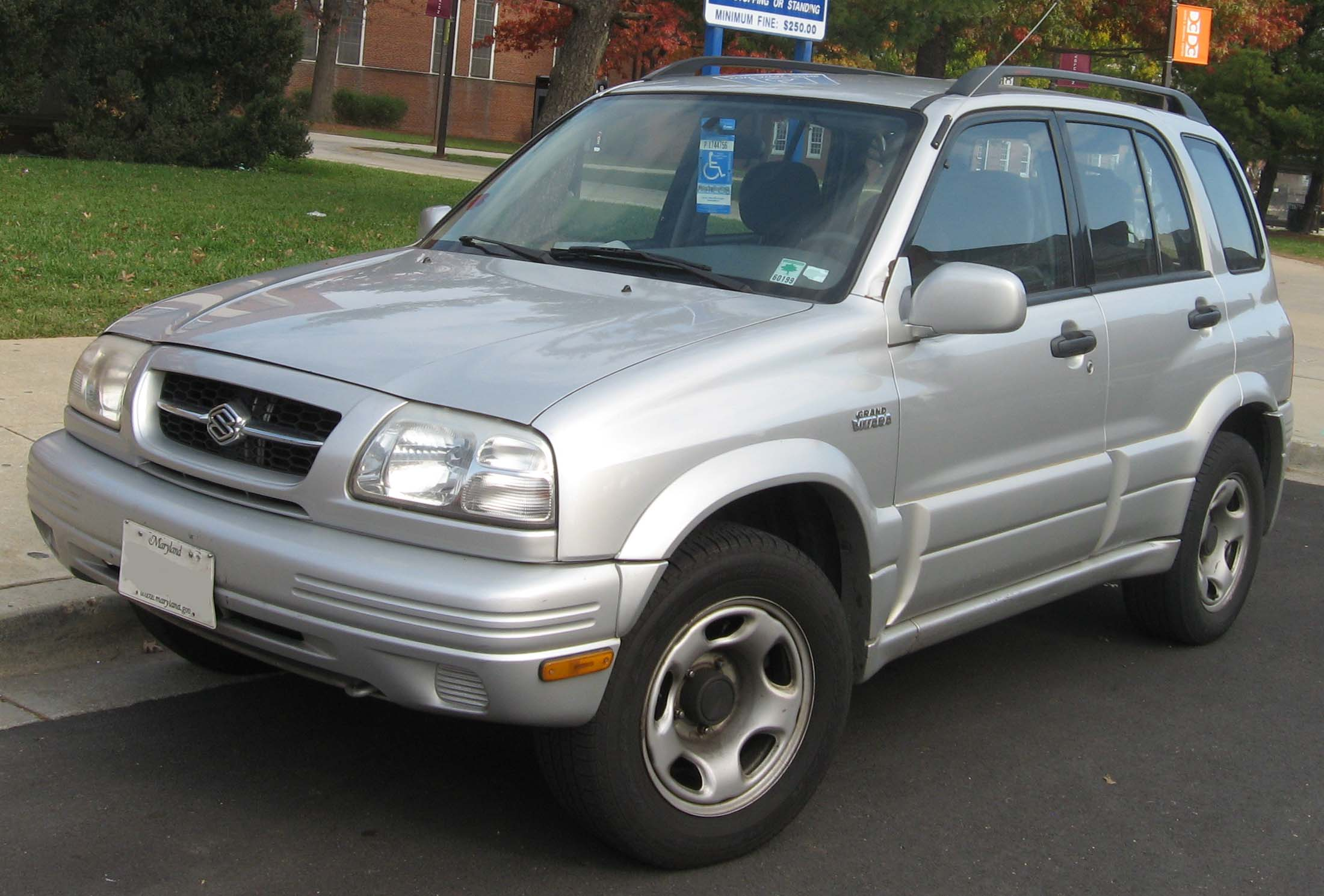
- 1997–2000 Suzuki Grand Vitara 5-door (US)

Overview
- Model code: FT; GT
- Also called: Chevrolet Tracker; Mazda Proceed Levante; Suzuki Escudo; Suzuki Grand Vitara; Chevrolet Grand Vitara
- Production: 1998–2005
- Model years: 1999–2005
- Assembly: Japan: Iwata, Shizuoka (Iwata Plant); Canada: Ingersoll, Ontario (CAMI Automotive); Indonesia: Bekasi (Suzuki Indomobil Motor); Argentina: Alvear, Santa Fe (General Motors de Argentina); Ecuador: Quito, Pichincha (GM Ecuador)

Body and chassis
- Class: Mini SUV (2 and 3-door); Compact SUV (5-door)
- Body style: 2-door convertible; 3 and 5-door SUV
- Layout: Front-engine, rear-wheel-drive; Front-engine, four-wheel-drive
- Related: Suzuki XL-7

Powertrain
- Engine: Petrol: 1.6 L G16B I4; 2.0 L J20A I4; 2.5 L H25A V6; Diesel: 2.0 L Mazda RF/RFM I4 TD; 2.0 L PSA RHW/RHZ HDi I4 turbo-diesel
- Transmission: 5-speed manual; 4-speed Aisin 03-72LE automatic

Dimensions
- Wheelbase: 3-door: 2,200 mm (86.6 in); 5-door: 2,480 mm (97.6 in)
- Length: 3-door: 3,810 mm (150.0 in); 5-door: 4,090–4,155 mm (161.0–163.6 in)
- Width: 3-door: 1,695 mm (66.7 in); 5-door: 1,695–1,840 mm (66.7–72.4 in)
- Height: 1,685–1,740 mm (66.3–68.5 in)
- Curb weight: 3-door: 1,180–1,280 kg (2,601–2,822 lb); 5-door: 1,260–1,460 kg (2,778–3,219 lb)

Suzuki announced the second generation model in November 1997. Slightly larger, more expensive, and more powerful, it used a light-duty automobile-type rack-and-pinion steering box instead of the recirculating ball truck unit used in the first generation. The three-door version remained in the mini SUV class while the five-door version moved up to a compact SUV. In most international markets the name "Grand Vitara" was adopted. In many markets it was originally only available with larger (two litres and up) engines while the earlier Vitara was still available with smaller engines. In the United Kingdom, a 1.6-litre Grand Vitara (the GV1600) arrived in early 2001.

The Vitara continued production under the name Escudo in Japan and Indonesia. The internal model codes for the Japanese models are TA02W / TD02W / TD32W / TD52W / TD62W / TL52W, with "T" for the Escudo family, the second letter indicating body dimensions, the third character (number) indicating the engine, and the final "2W" for second generation, station wagon. Mazda also continued selling rebadged Escudo in Japan as Proceed Levante until 2000 when it was replaced by Mazda Tribute.

It received its facelift in 2000, 2002 and again in 2004. As of 2003, the smaller Vitara has been withdrawn from the North American market. Sales were slow, with just 4,860 sold in 2004 for the United States. In Canada, sales were strong. All North American Vitaras were built at CAMI Automotive in Ingersoll, Ontario facility. The soft-top was only built in North America. The 3/5-door wagon was brought in from Japan for European buyers and sold alongside the Canadian-made convertibles. The 2001 model Suzuki Grand Vitara comes standard as a 2.0-litre 4WD vehicle in New Zealand.

This generation was also assembled in Argentina by General Motors in Alvear, Santa Fe from 2000 to 2005 along with the Chevrolet version for several countries in South American market.

In the Philippines, the Grand Vitara (FT) replaced the aging ET Vitara. It was introduced in 1998. It is offered in 2 different trims, the "Sport" & "Elite Sport". The "Sport" is powered by Suzuki's 2.0L inline-four coupled to a 5-speed manual transmission while the "Elite Sport" is powered by a bigger 2.5L V6 engine coupled to either a 5-speed manual or 4-speed automatic transmission. Both trims came in "Low-Range 4WD" configuration. The "Elite Sport" featured third-row seats, automatic climate controls, three-spoke steering wheel, Japanese vinyl (earlier models), central locking, tachometer, keyless entry with immobilizer.

By 2002, Suzuki introduced the "XL7" in the Philippine market. It is powered by Suzuki's bigger 2.7L V6 engine coupled to a 5-speed automatic transmission. It featured longer wheelbase as opposed to the Vitara which has a shorter wheelbase. It also featured redesigned front-end, slightly different sidings & a complete refreshed rear-end. Production of the 2nd Generation Grand Vitara in the Philippines ended in 2005 while the XL7 continued until 2006.

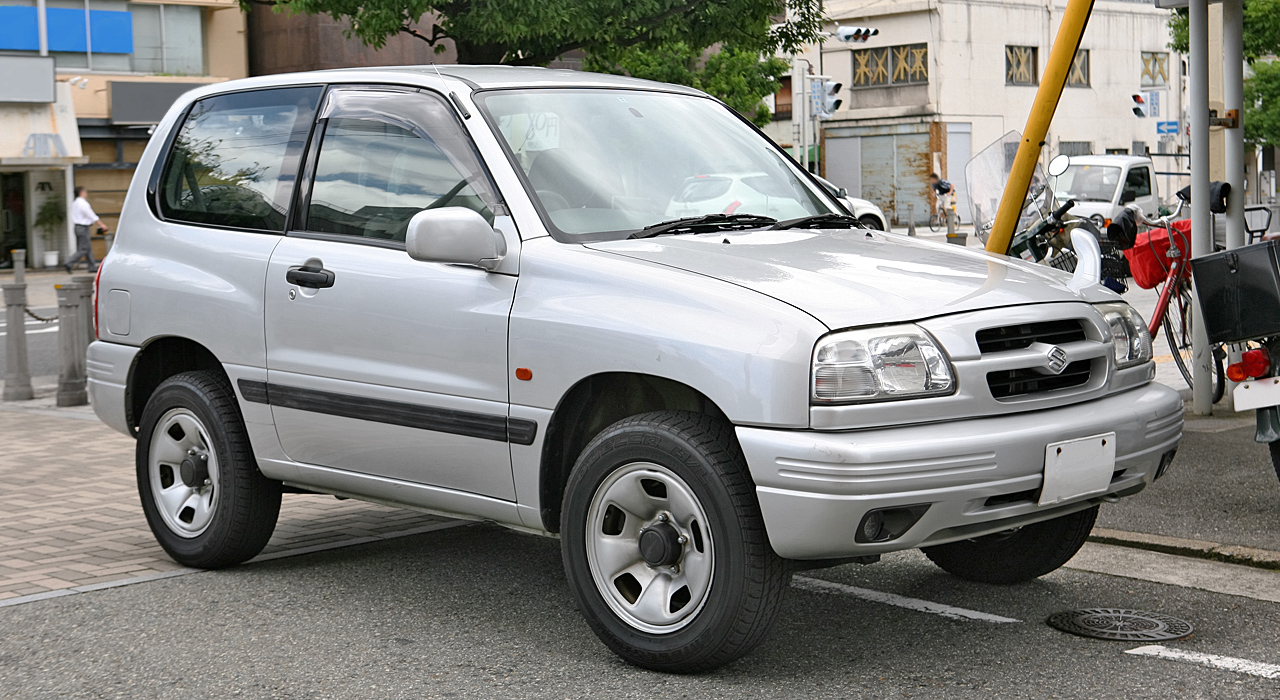
1997–2000 Suzuki Escudo 3-door (Japan)

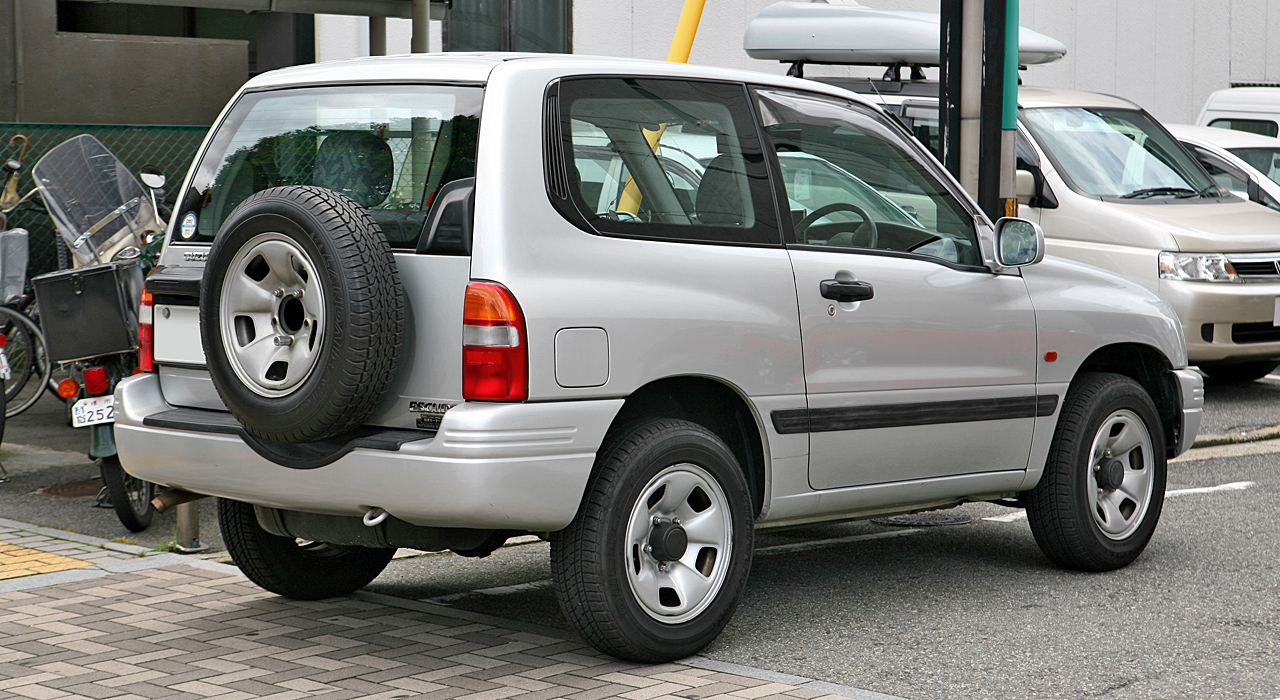
1997–2000 Suzuki Escudo 3-door (Japan)

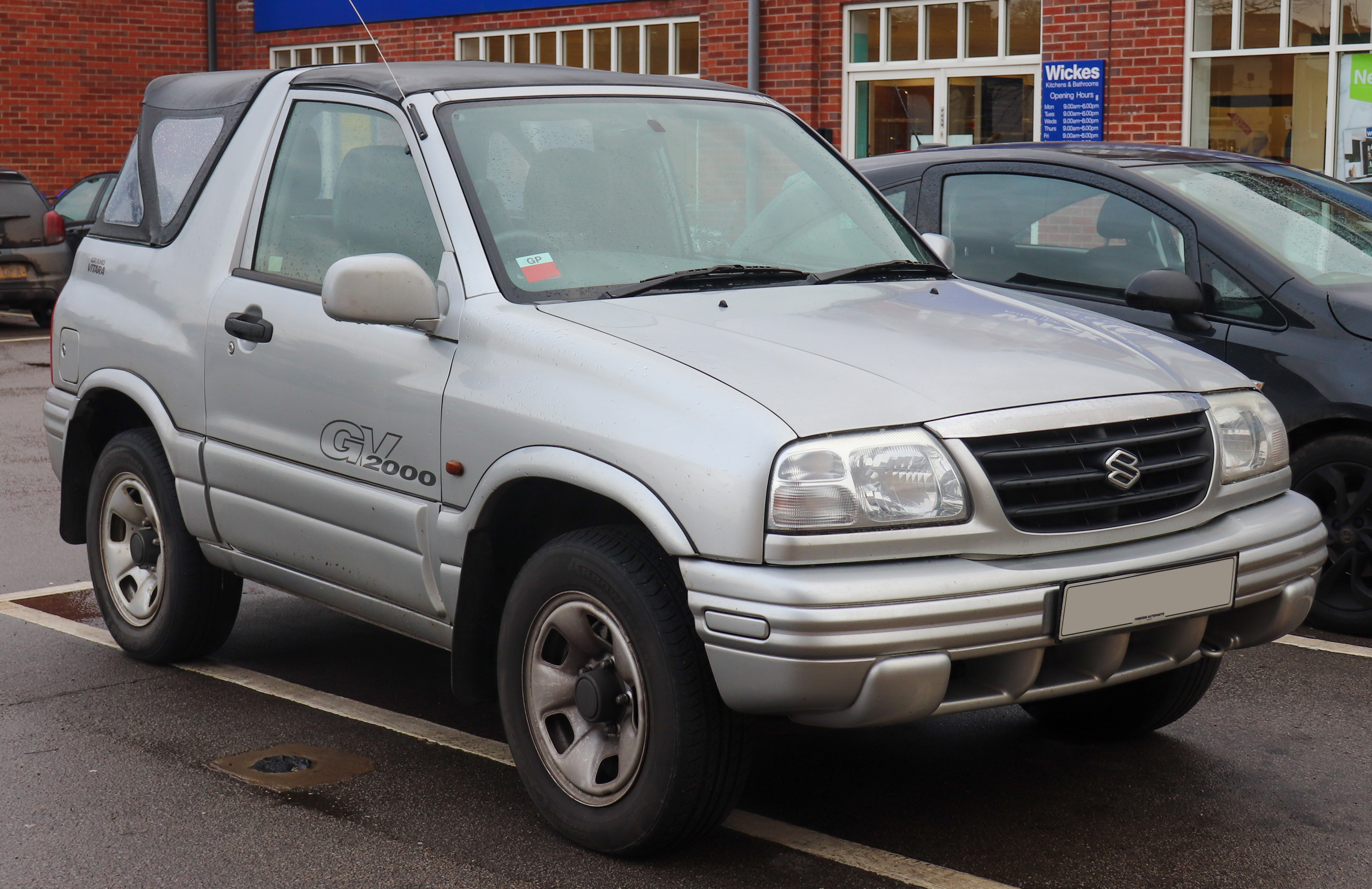
2000–2005 Suzuki Grand Vitara 2-door soft top convertible (UK)

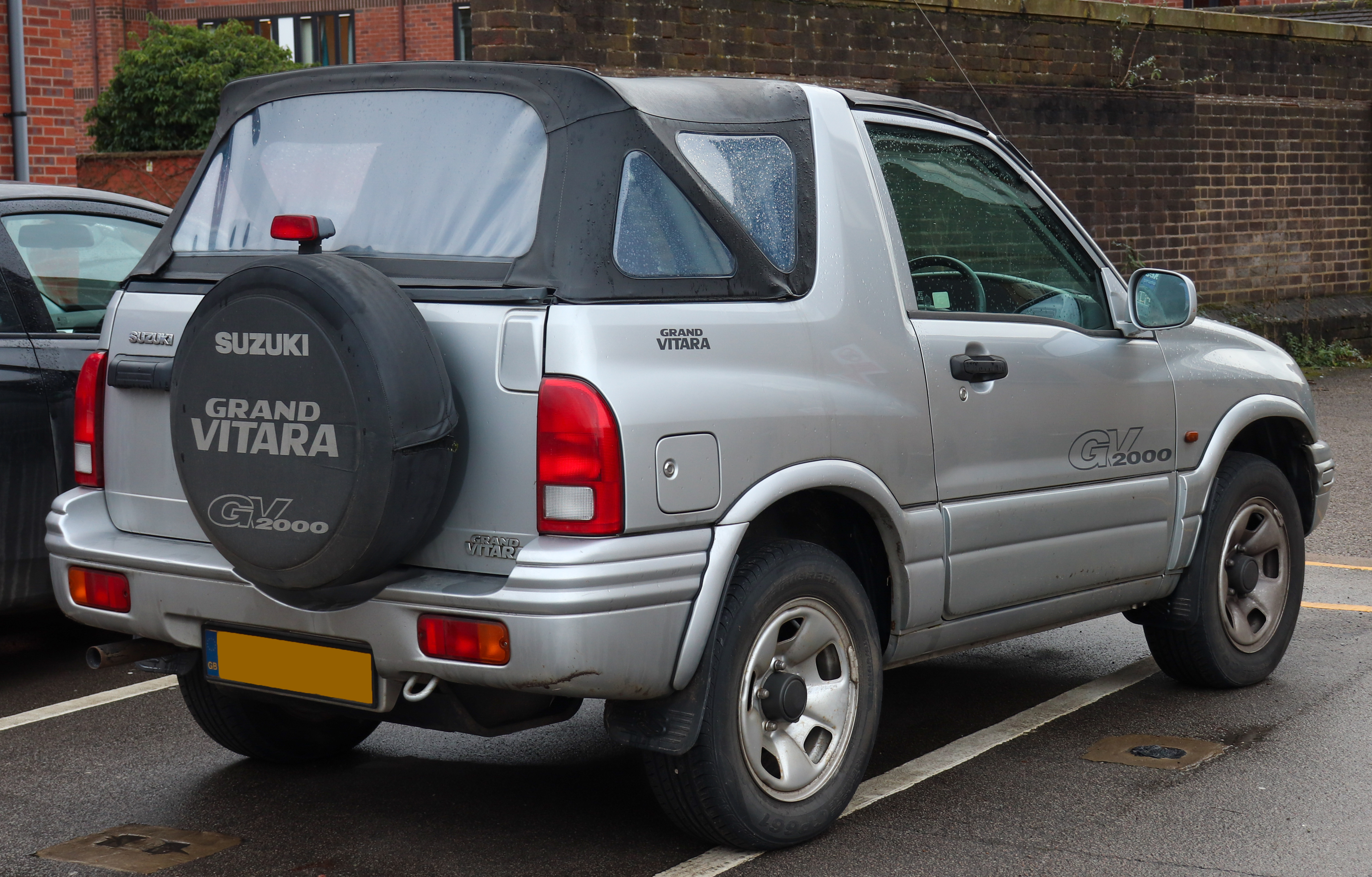
2000–2005 Suzuki Grand Vitara 2-door soft top convertible (UK)

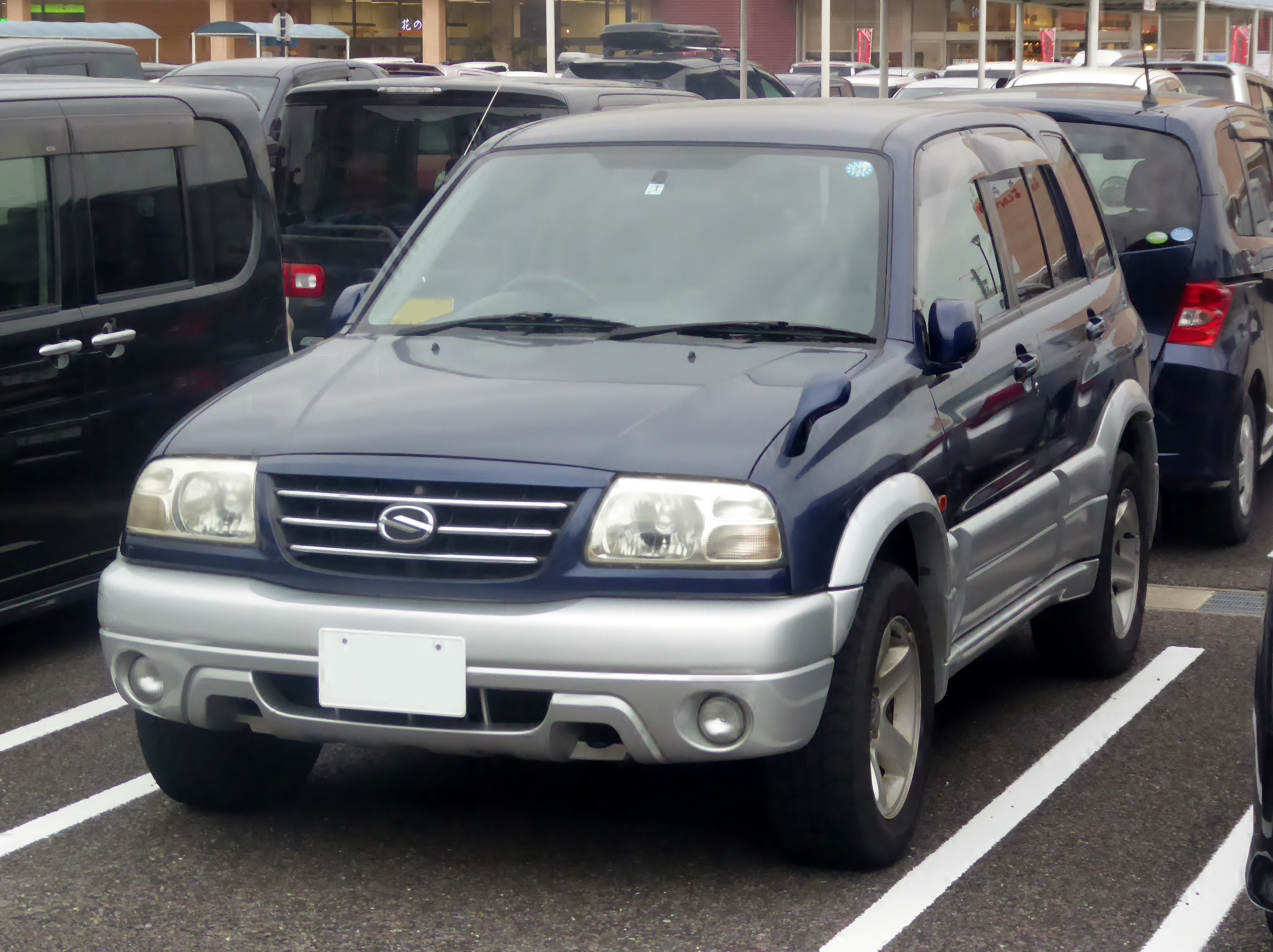
2000–2005 Suzuki Escudo 5-door (Japan)

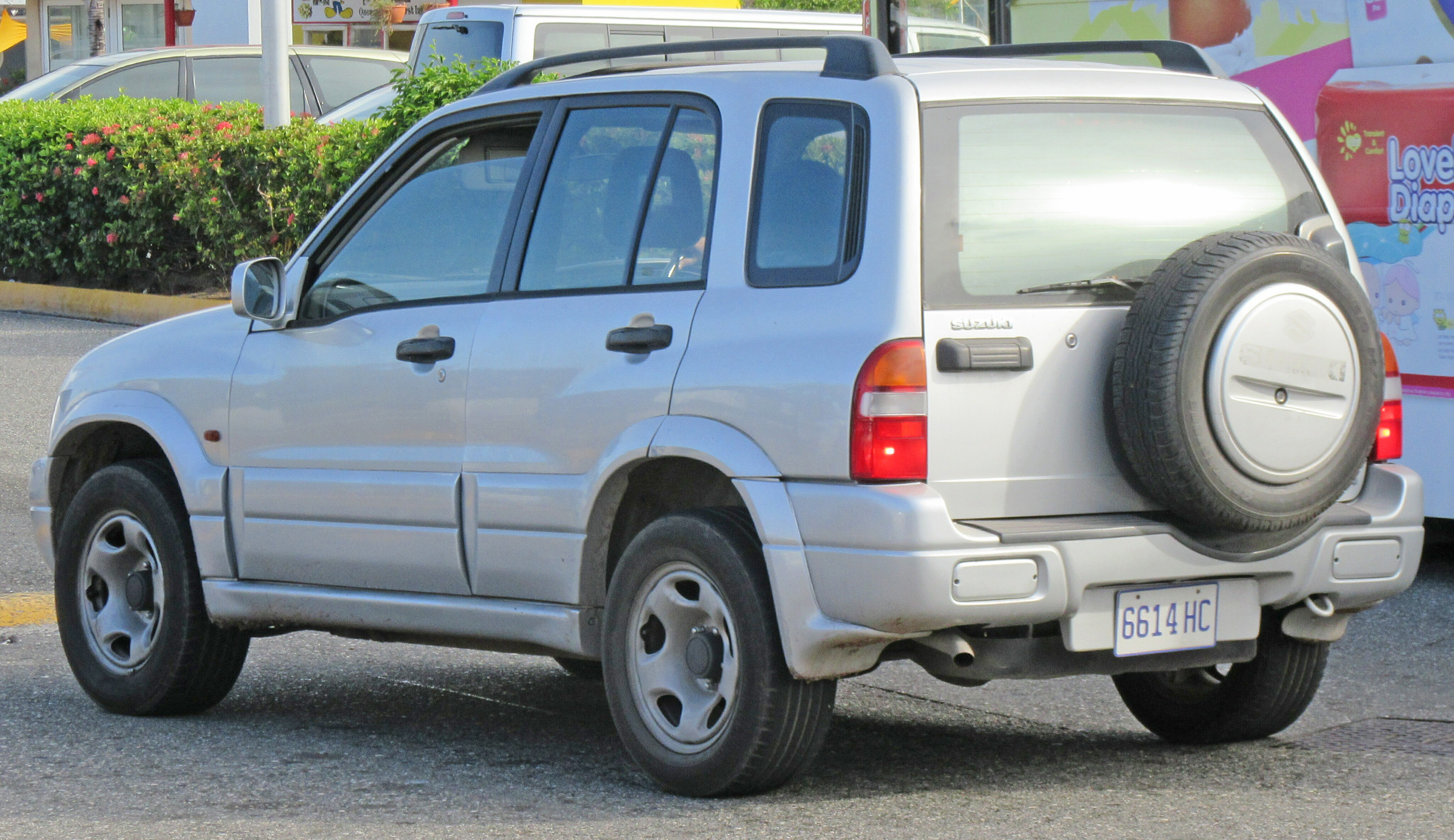
Suzuki Grand Vitara 5-door

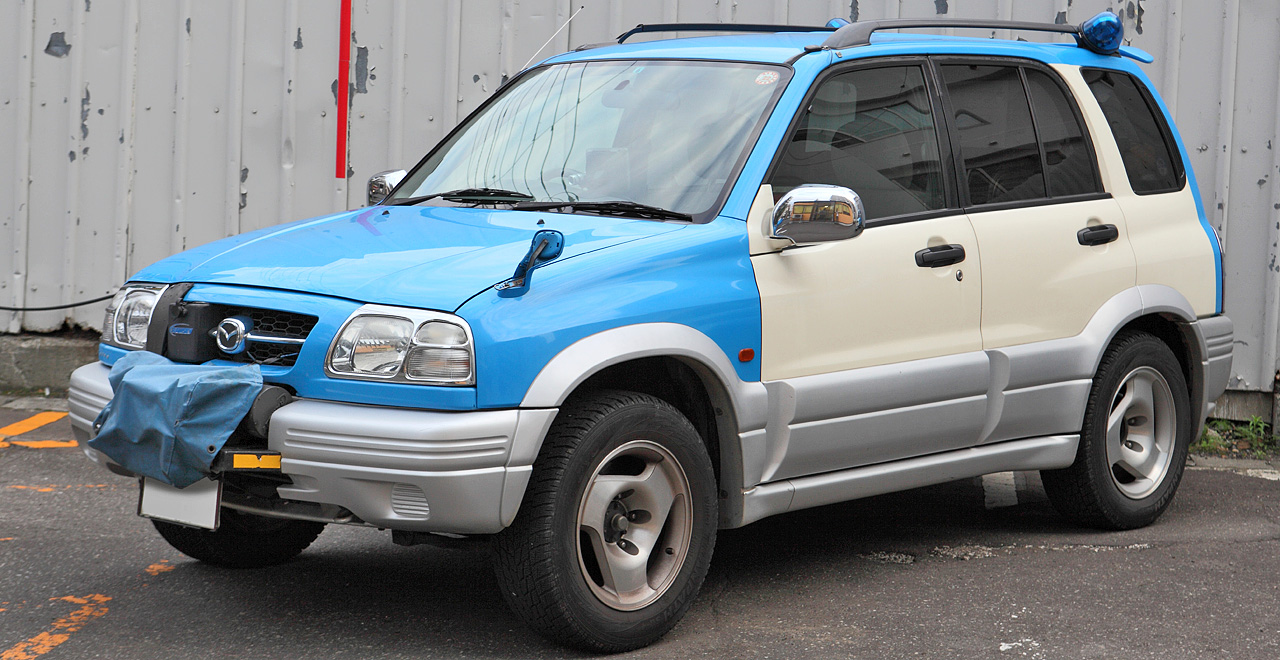
1997–2000 Mazda Proceed Levante (Japan)

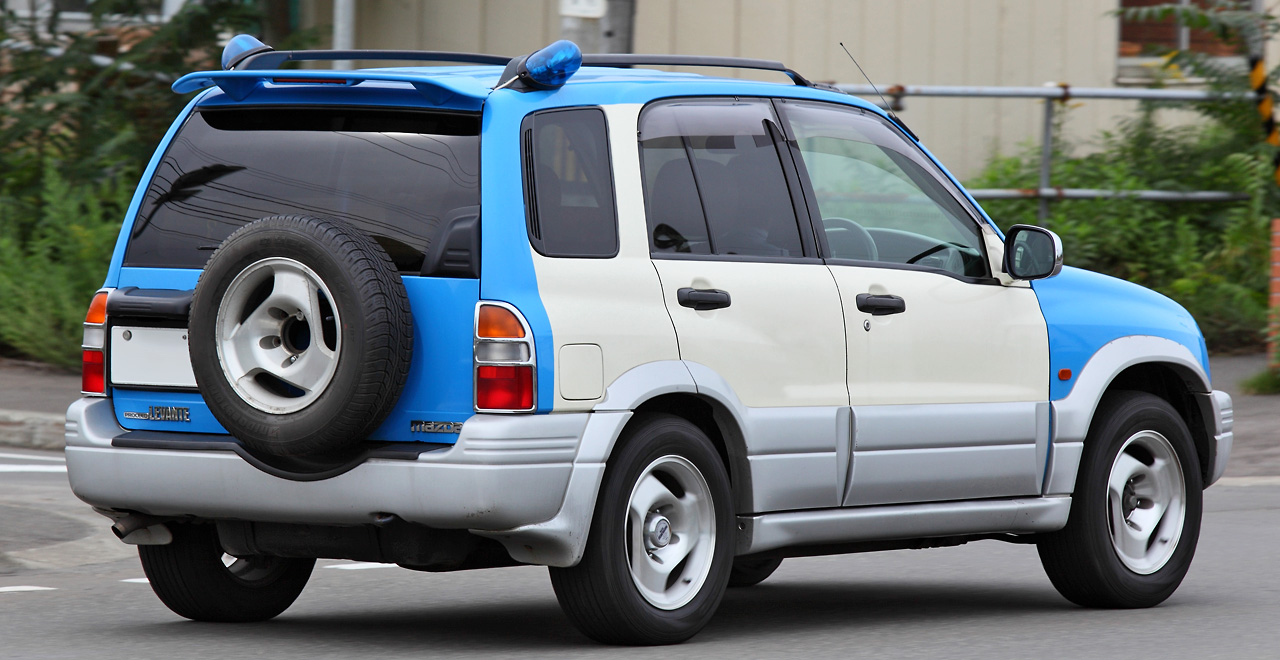
1997–2000 Mazda Proceed Levante (Japan)

=== Grand Escudo ===
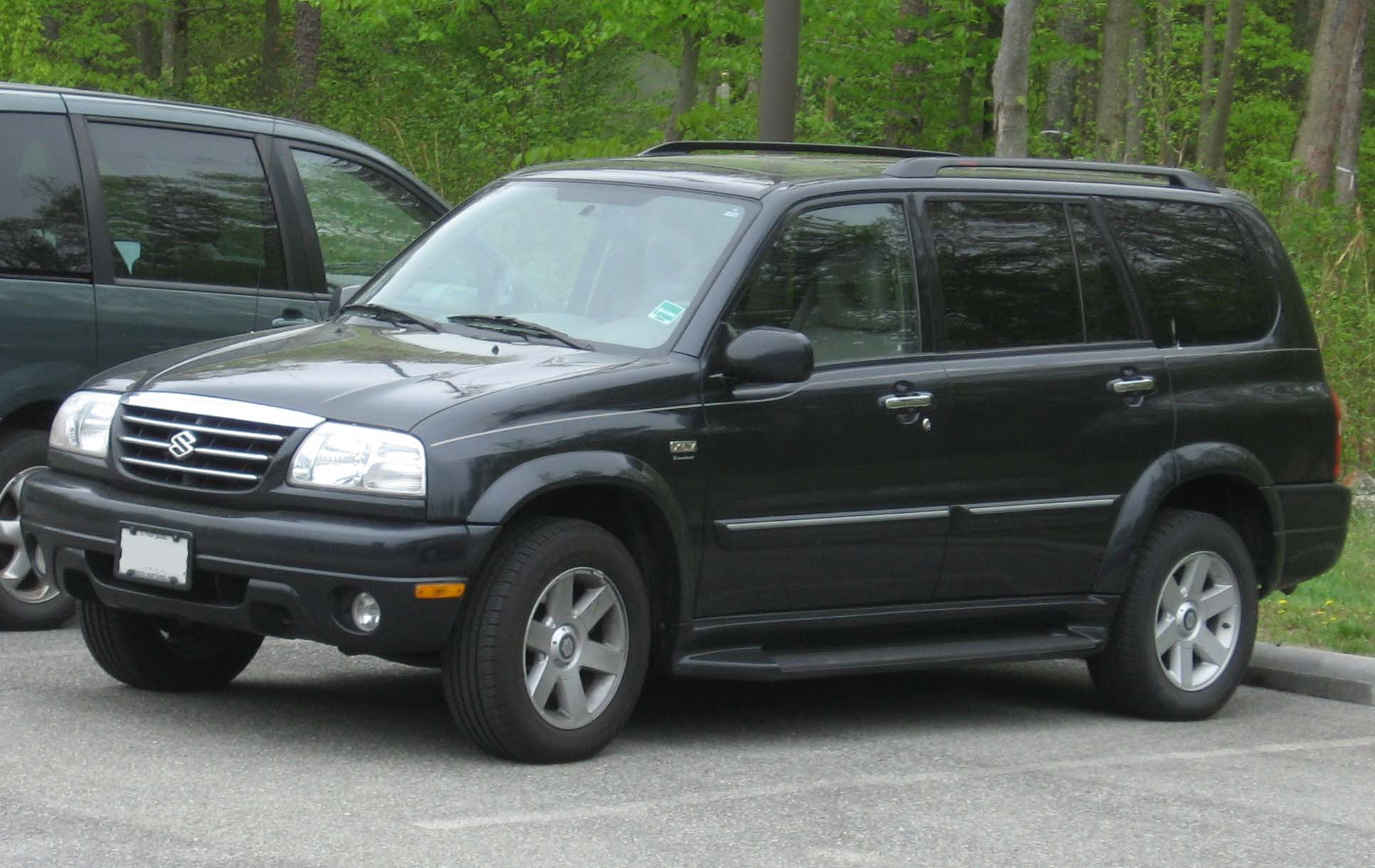
Suzuki XL-7 (US)

In 1998, the Grand Escudo was released, a longer 7-seater, slightly larger, pricier and more powerful version of the regular five-door. The Japanese market Grand Escudo was sold in North America and Chile as the Suzuki XL-7. In Australia, Europe and India it was marketed as the Grand Vitara XL-7. In Indonesia, it was sold as Grand Escudo XL-7.

=== Safety ===
ANCAP test results Suzuki Grand Vitara 5 door wagon (2001)
Test	Score
Overall	5 /5 stars
Frontal offset	8.09/16
Side impact	14.85/16
Pole	Not Assessed
Seat belt reminders	0/3
Whiplash protection	Not Assessed
Pedestrian protection	Poor
Electronic stability control	Not Assessed

== Third generation (JT; 2005) ==
Third generation
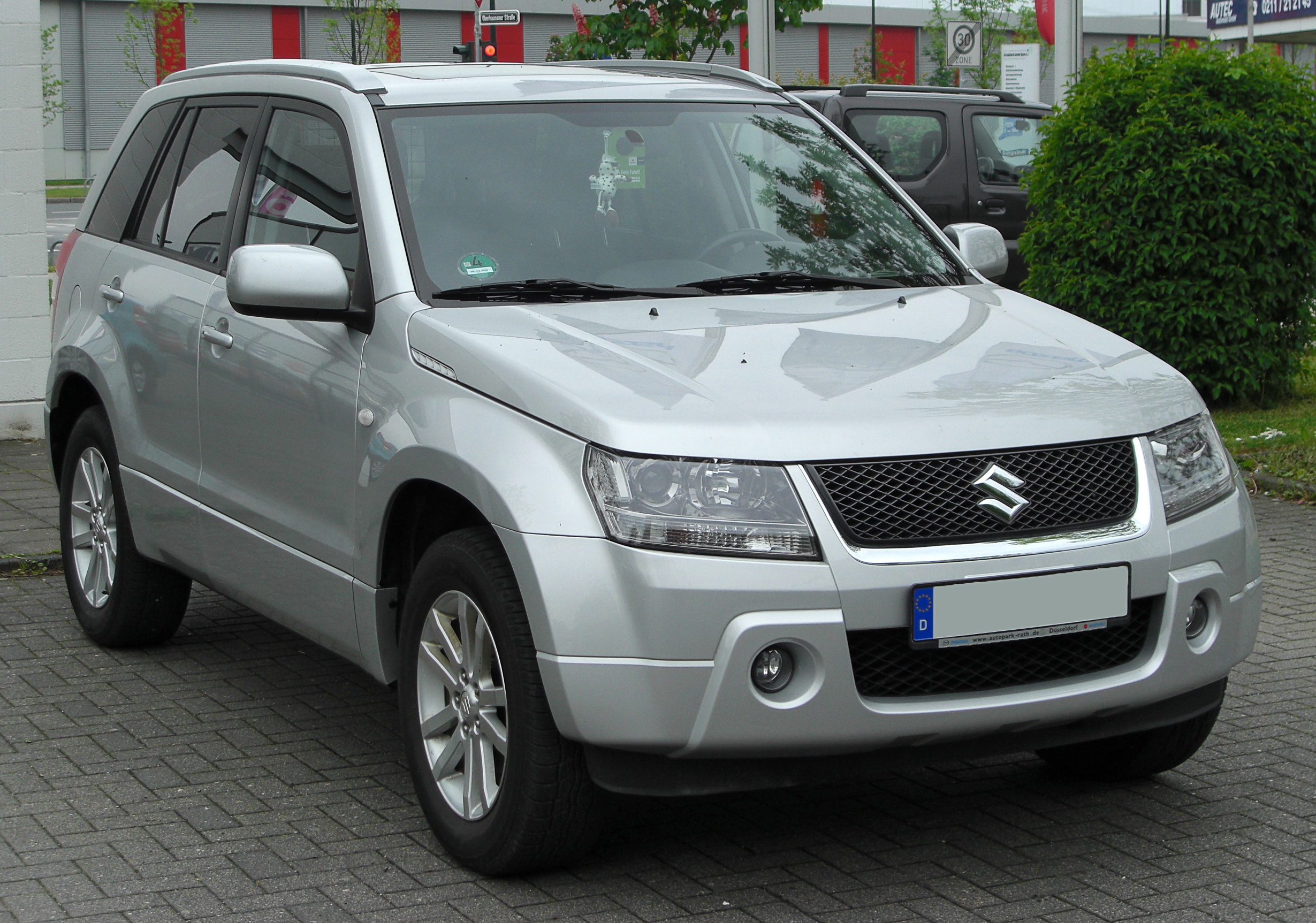
- Suzuki Grand Vitara (2005–2008)

Overview
- Model code: JT
- Also called: Suzuki Escudo; Suzuki Grand Vitara; Suzuki Grand Nomade (Chile); Chevrolet Grand Vitara SZ (Ecuador)
- Production: 2005–2017 (extended production continued for some markets until 2019)
- Assembly: Japan: Iwata, Shizuoka; Indonesia: Bekasi, West Java (SIM); Iran: Binalud, Razavi Khorasan (IKCO); Ecuador: Quito, Pichincha (GM Ecuador)

Body and chassis
- Class: Compact SUV
- Body style: 3/5-door SUV
- Layout: Front-engine, rear-wheel-drive; Front-engine, four-wheel-drive

Powertrain
- Engine: Petrol: 1.6 L M16A I4; 2.0 L J20A I4; 2.4 L J24B I4; 2.7 L H27A V6; 3.2 L GM N32A V6; Diesel: 1.9 L Renault F9Q I4 DDiS turbo-diesel
- Transmission: 5-speed manual; 4-speed Aisin 03-72LE automatic; 5-speed Aisin TB-50LS automatic (V6 only)

Dimensions
- Wheelbase: 3-door: 2,440 mm (96.1 in); 5-door: 2,640 mm (103.9 in)
- Length: 3-door: 3,950–4,005 mm (155.5–157.7 in); 5-door: 4,390–4,500 mm (172.8–177.2 in)
- Width: 1,810 mm (71.3 in)
- Height: 1,695 mm (66.7 in)
- Curb weight: 1,420–1,710 kg (3,130.6–3,769.9 lb)

Chronology
- Successor: Suzuki Across (Europe)

An all-new redesigned Grand Vitara (called Escudo in Japan or Grand Nomade in Chile) was introduced for the 2005 model year. The third-generation received significant changes over the outgoing model. The ladder-frame construction was replaced with unibody construction which featured a unique built-in ladder frame to improve stiffness and ground clearance while also reducing the floor (and subsequently the roof) height. The outgoing model's front MacPherson strut suspension was retained while the rear solid axle was replaced with a fully independent multi-link suspension. Depending on the market, engine options included a 1.6-litre inline-four with 125 PS (92 kW), 2.0-litre inline-four with 140 PS (103 kW), 2.7-litre V6 with 185 PS (136 kW), and a 1.9-litre Renault-sourced diesel engine with 127 PS (93 kW).

The engine and transmission are longitudinally mounted, unlike most front-wheel-drive-based compact SUVs in its class. Most engines are available with either a 5-speed manual or 4-speed automatic transmission. A 5-speed automatic transmission is only available on V6 variants. The Grand Vitara is available in both rear-wheel drive only models (for the Australian market) or with full-time 4WD. The full-time 4WD system is always engaged and contains a torque sensing limited slip center differential with 47:53 front to rear axle torque distribution ratio. Some 3-door Vitara editions do not have the ability to lock the center differential and do not have low range gearing transmission mode. The 5-door Vitara (and some 3-door editions) has the ability to lock the center differential (transmission mode called "4H lock") and also has a low range transmission mode with locked center differential (called "4L lock") with the reduction gearing ratio at 1:1.97 (roughly twice slower with twice more torque than in high range transmission mode). There is also the neutral transmission mode meant to be used if the vehicle is being towed.

The most widely available Vitara is the 5-door version, but a three-door version is also available in some markets such as in Japan, Australia, (parts of the) Middle East, New Zealand and (most of) South America. In some markets, the three-door variant drops the "Grand" to be branded simply as "Vitara". In some countries, including Chile, the 5-door version is named "Grand Nomade". In Taiwan, this was sold as the Suzuki Grand Vitara JP.

The third-generation Grand Vitara is not based on the GM Theta platform, since the model was developed by Suzuki separately from General Motors and shares no components with GM vehicles.

The 1.6-litre M16A petrol inline-four is available in the base-spec 3-door version in Japan and many other markets; the base-spec 5-door was also offered with this engine in certain markets. This engine was only available in conjunction with a 5-speed manual. The 2.0 L J20A petrol inline-four is available in both bodystyles, usually with a 5-speed manual, but a 4-speed automatic transmission is also available.

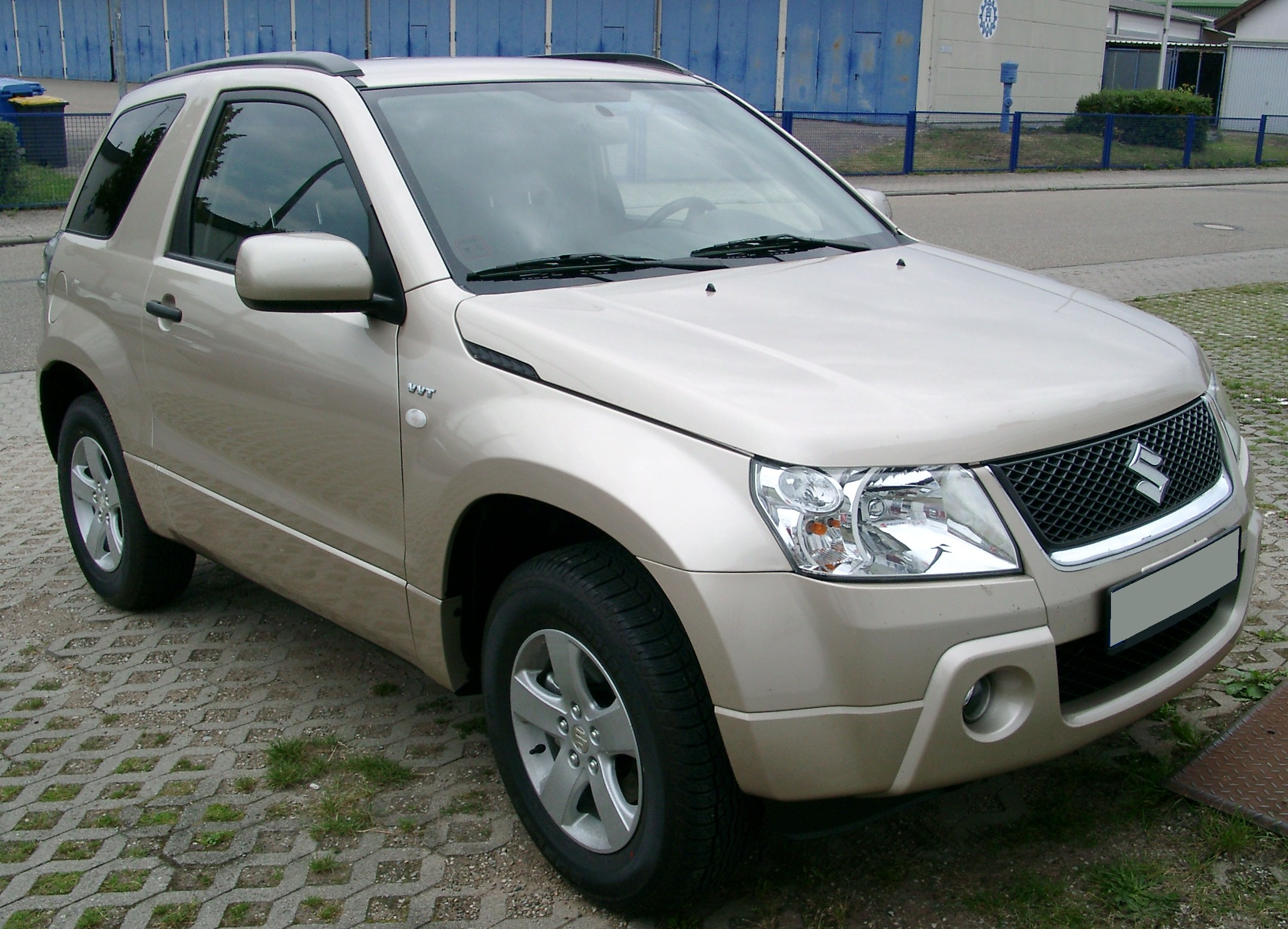
3-door SUV

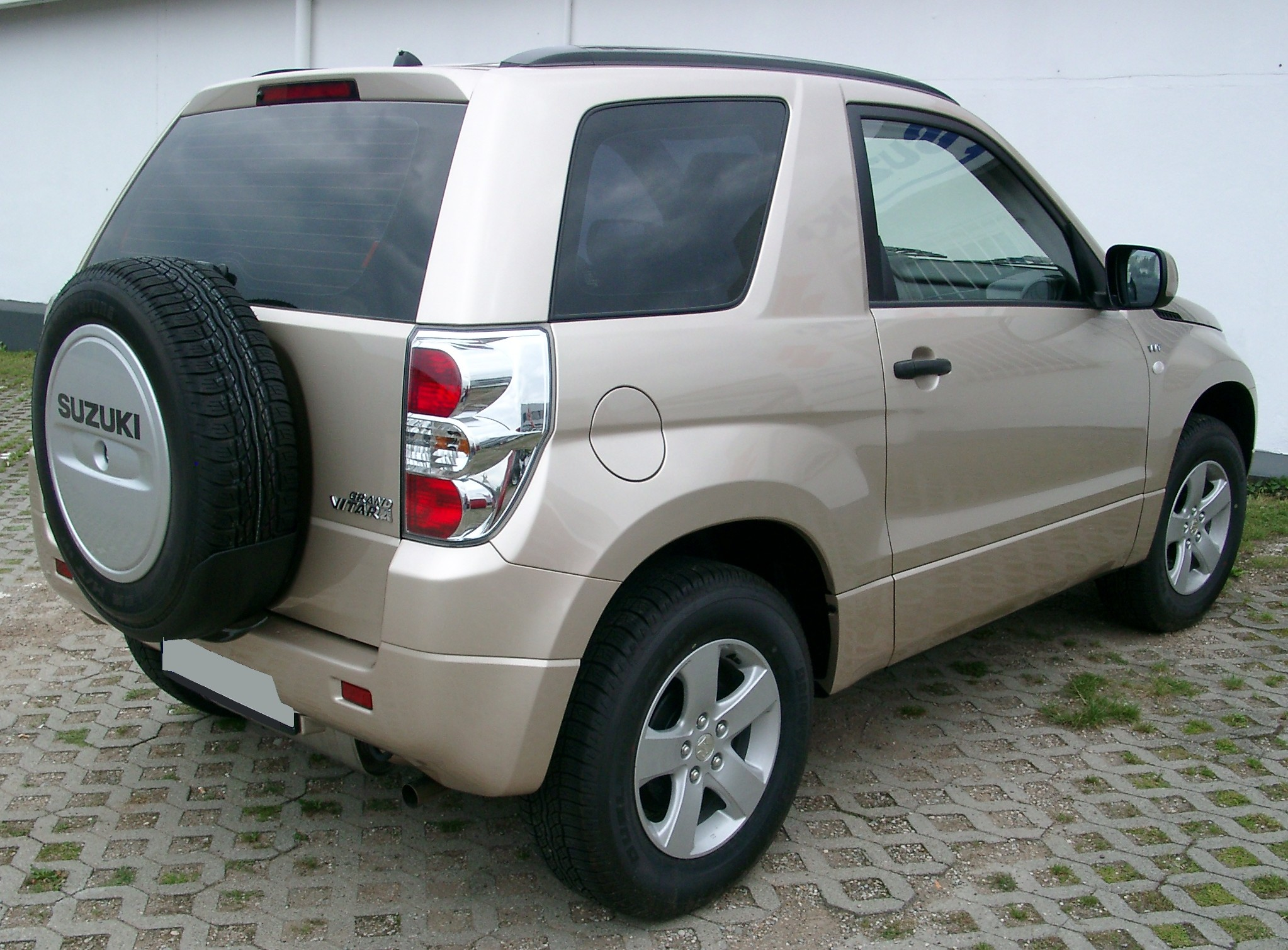
3-door SUV

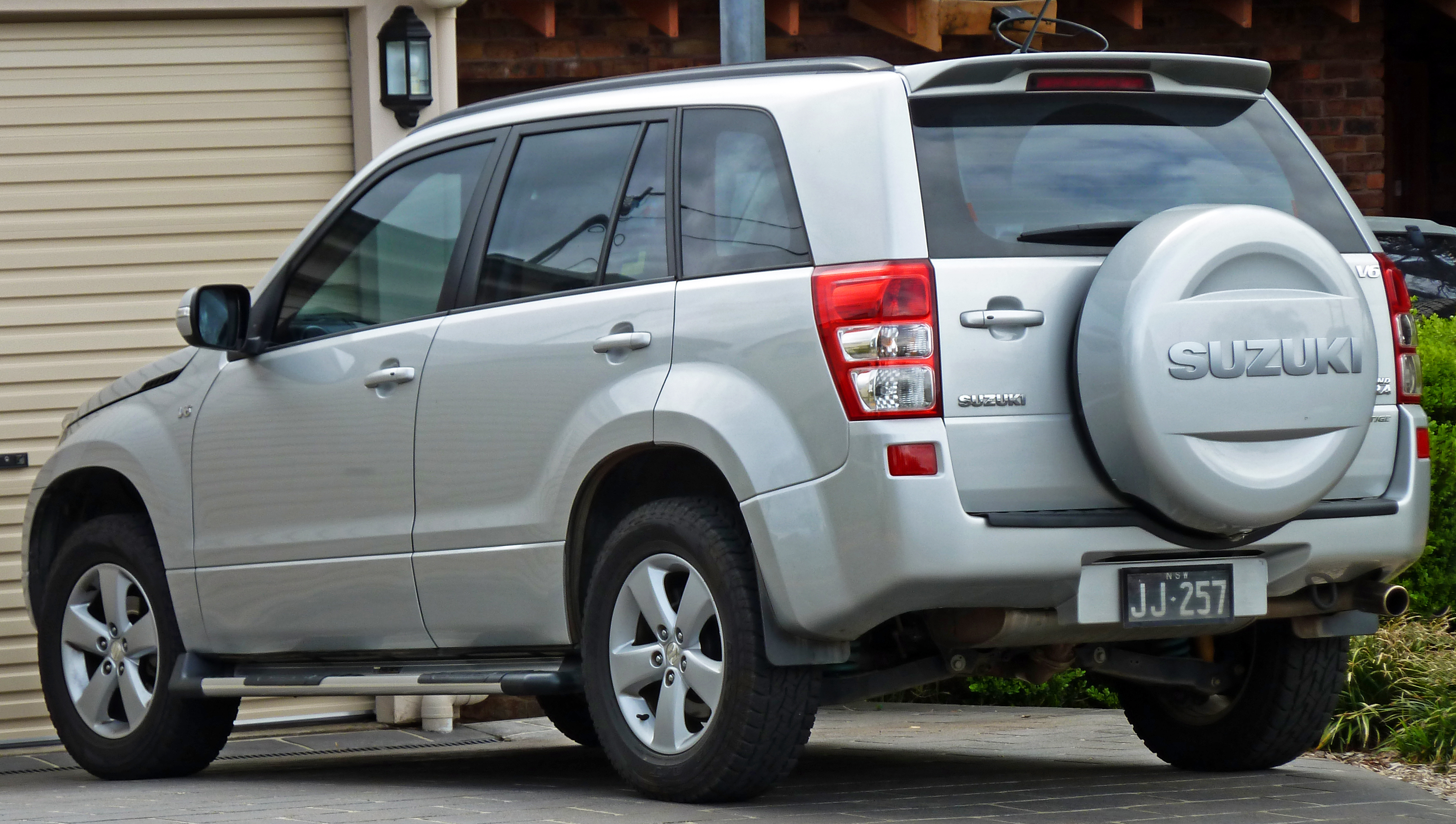
5-door SUV

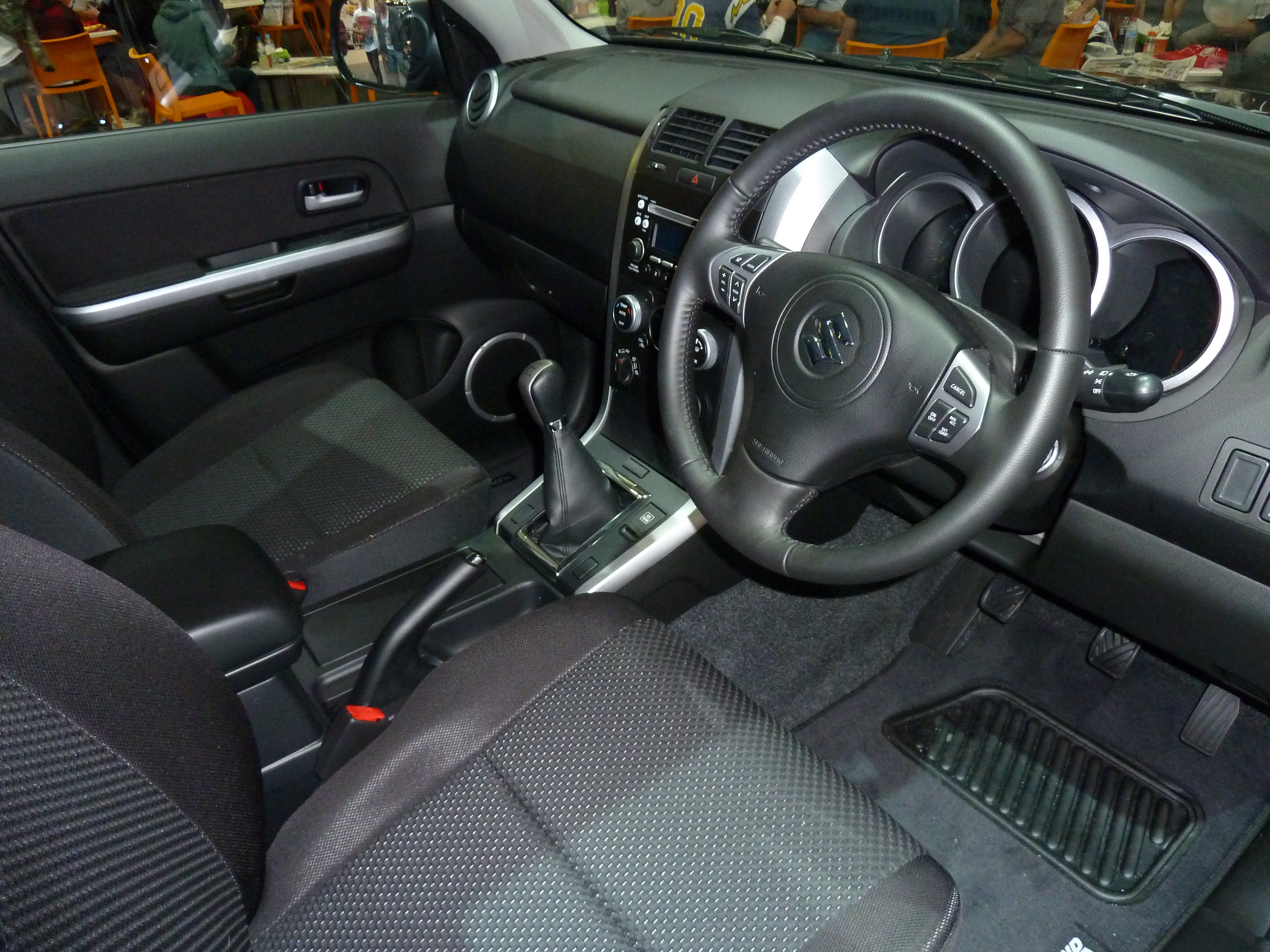
Interior

=== 2008–2011 ===
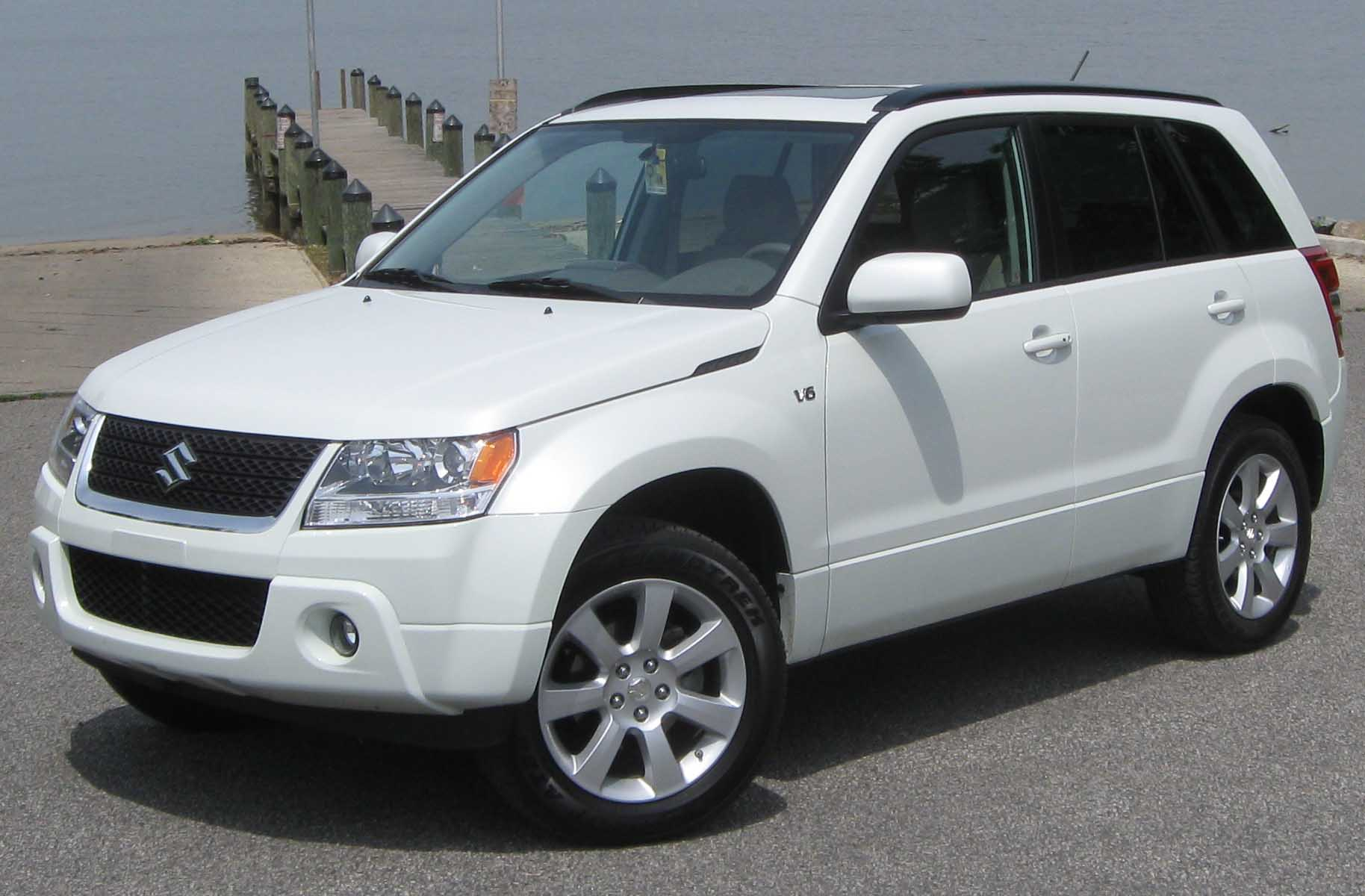
Suzuki Grand Vitara (2008–2011)

In the second half of 2008, the Grand Vitara was given a facelift and two new engines. A Suzuki-developed 2.4-litre inline four is offered producing 166 PS (122 kW; 164 hp) and 221 N⋅m (163 lb⋅ft) of torque, usually in conjunction with the 4-speed automatic transmission. The previous 2.7-litre Suzuki V6 was replaced with a GM-sourced 3.2-litre V6. The 3.2 V6 was only offered in the flagship prestige model which produces 172 kW (233 PS; 230 hp) of power and 289 N⋅m (213 lb⋅ft) of torque. Fuel economy has also been improved with the addition of VVT to both engines, and the 1.9-litre turbo-diesel has also received some updates, improving fuel economy. Safety has also been improved with more airbags and traction control being standard on all models. The four mode 4WD system is also available on all models. It features a lockable central differential along with low ratio gears. Subtle improvements were made on the exterior of the car, such as indicators relocated to the door mirrors, and a more pronounced front grille and bumper. The interior was also updated.

In 2010, a version without a rear-mounted spare tyre was released for selected markets such as Japan, North America and Europe. This reduced the vehicle length by 200 mm and vehicle weight as well, however at the cost of having a tyre repair kit instead of a spare tyre.

=== 2012–2019 ===
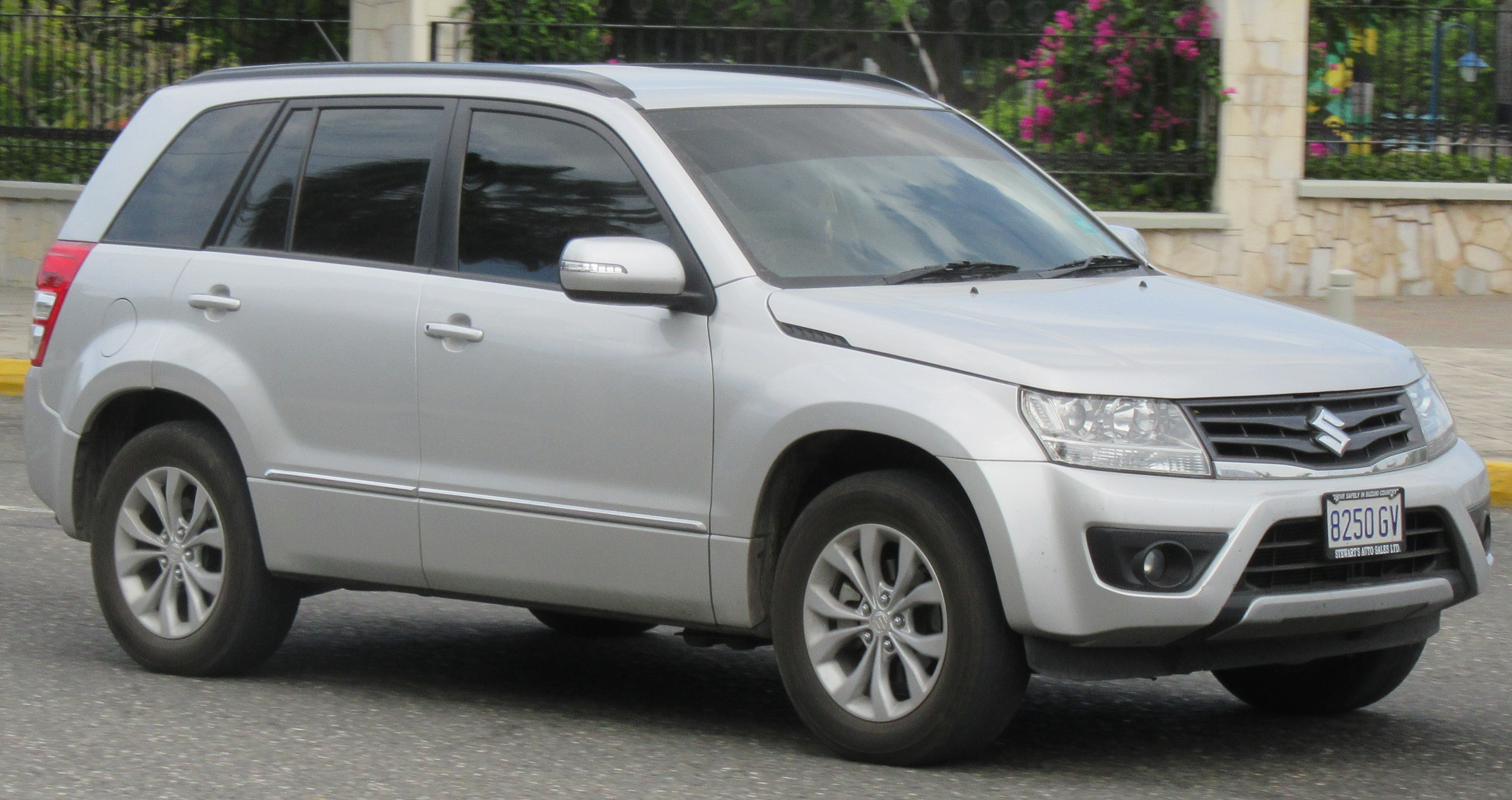
Suzuki Grand Vitara (2012–2019)

In the second quarter of 2012 for the 2013 model year, Suzuki unveiled a facelifted Vitara with new wheels, a new grille and front lights. The V6 engine was discontinued. Starting with this facelift, the Grand Vitara in Indonesia is imported from Japan.

=== Discontinuation ===
Suzuki officially discontinued the third-generation Escudo in Japan in April 2017, however production would continue for export markets. In Indonesia, the third-generation Grand Vitara was discontinued in 2018. It was also no longer available in Europe, CIS countries and Southeast Asia. It was no longer listed on the Suzuki Philippines website as of January 2019, indicating that it was no longer available. In Iran, it was discontinued in July 2019 due to a shortage of CKD parts in Iran Khodro's facilities, low sales, and the political tensions and sanctions.

As of July 2019, the Grand Vitara was removed from the Suzuki Australia website and it had been withdrawn from sale, and in South Africa, it was officially discontinued in October 2019 with sales continuing well into 2020.

=== Safety ===
ANCAP test results Suzuki Grand Vitara variants with side & curtain airbags (2006)
Test	Score
Overall	4 /5 stars
Frontal offset	10.87/16
Side impact	16/16
Pole	2/2
Seat belt reminders	0/3
Whiplash protection	Not Assessed
Pedestrian protection	Adequate
Electronic stability control	Optional

== Fourth generation (LY; 2015) ==
Fourth generation
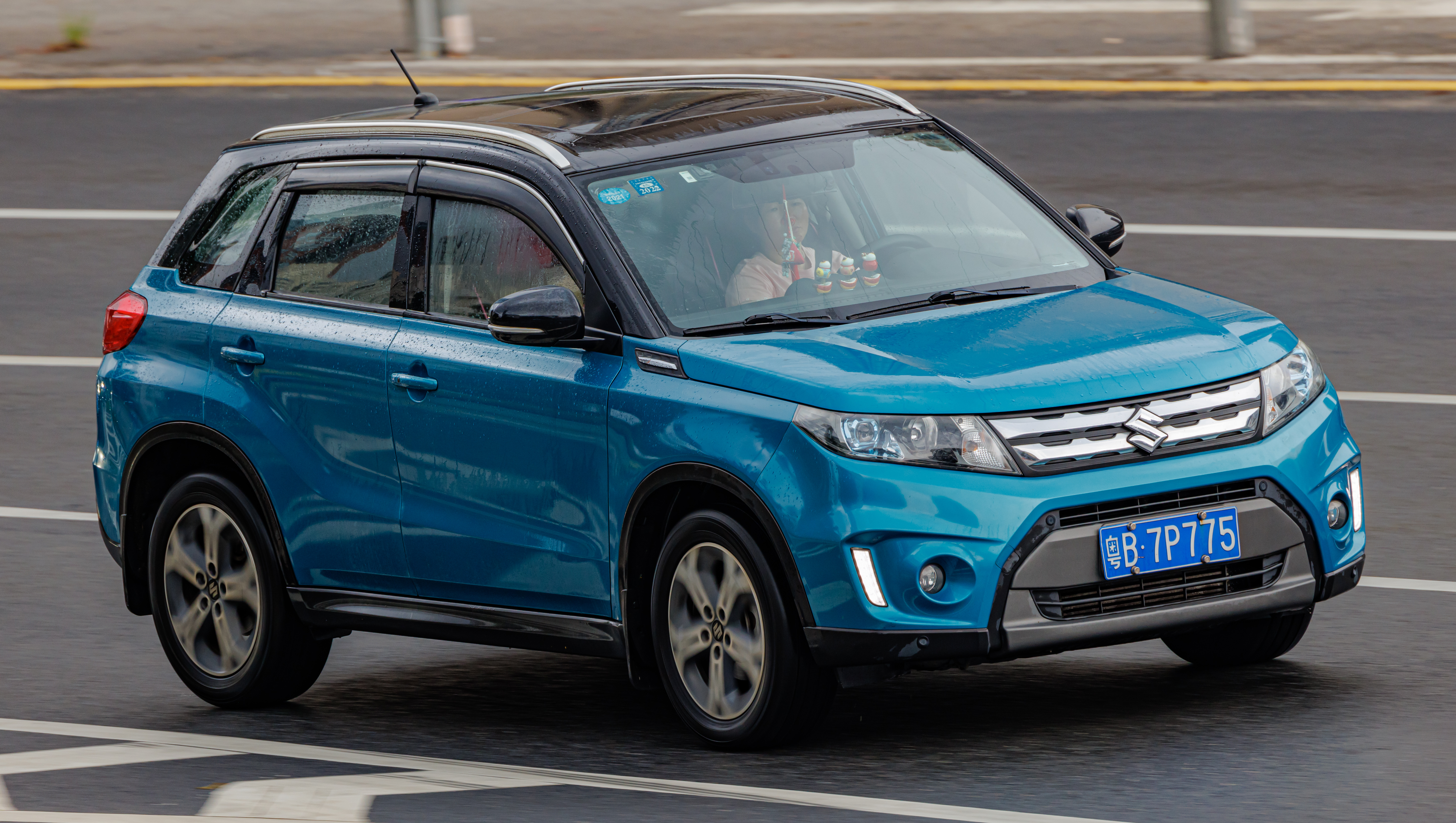
- Suzuki Vitara (pre-facelift)

Overview
- Model code: LY
- Also called: Suzuki Escudo (Japan, 2015–2024)
- Production: March 2015 – present
- Assembly: Hungary: Esztergom (Magyar Suzuki); China: Chongqing (Changan Suzuki) (2015–2018)
- Designer: Kosei Iwasaki, Toshinobu Ishida, Kanae Ito, Kazuhisa Takayanagi and Yoshitaka Uchiyama

Body and chassis
- Class: Subcompact crossover SUV
- Body style: 5-door SUV
- Layout: Front-engine, front-wheel-drive; Front-engine, four-wheel-drive
- Platform: Global C platform
- Related: Suzuki Brezza; Suzuki Grand Vitara (2022); Suzuki SX4 S-Cross

Powertrain
- Engine: Petrol: 1.0 L K10C Boosterjet I3-T; 1.4 L K14C Boosterjet I4-T; 1.6 L M16A I4; Petrol hybrid: 1.4 L K14D Boosterjet I4-T MHEV; 1.5 L K15C Dualjet I4 HEV; Diesel: 1.6 L FCA D16AA DDiS I4-TD
- Electric motor: MHEV: WA06B DC synchronous Integrated Starter Generator (ISG); HEV: PB03A AC synchronous Motor Generator Unit (MGU)
- Transmission: 5-speed manual (1.0 and 1.6); 6-speed manual (1.4, 1.5 and 1.6 diesel); 6-speed automatic (1.0, 1.4 and 1.6); 6-speed DCT "TCSS" (1.6 diesel AWD); 6-speed automated manual "AGS" (1.5)
- Hybrid drivetrain: 48V SHVS mild hybrid; 140V strong hybrid
- Battery: 6Ah Lithium-ion (HEV); 8Ah Lithium-ion (MHEV)

Dimensions
- Wheelbase: 2,500 mm (98.4 in)
- Length: 4,175 mm (164.4 in)
- Width: 1,775 mm (69.9 in)
- Height: 1,610 mm (63.4 in)
- Curb weight: 1,075–1,338 kg (2,370.0–2,949.8 lb)

The fourth-generation Vitara was presented first as the iV-4 concept at 65th IAA Frankfurt Motor Show in September 2013. The production model was unveiled at the 2014 Paris Motor Show. Its production by Magyar Suzuki in Hungary started in March 2015 and parallels with the third-generation model produced in Japan until 2019. The Vitara went on sale in Japan as the fourth-generation Escudo on 15 October 2015.

Unlike the previous generations, the all-new fourth-generation model was changed from the traditional ladder frame SUV platform to a lightweight unibody platform, shared with SX4 S-Cross. The engine position and layout also changed from longitudinal rear-wheel drive/all-wheel drive layout to transverse front-wheel drive/all-wheel drive layout. It is now sized as a subcompact crossover SUV, with 140 mm (5.5 in) shorter wheelbase, 325 mm (12.8 in) shorter body, 85 mm (3.3 in) lower and 35 mm (1.4 in) narrower than the previous generation Grand Vitara. It has a luggage space of 375-litre, expanding to 710-litre with rear seats folded (VDA method).

The fourth-generation Vitara features a 5-speed manual transmission for the 1.6-litre petrol engine and a 6-speed manual transmission for the 1.6-litre diesel engine. A 6-speed automatic transmission with paddle shifters is also available for the 1.6-litre petrol engine.

Suzuki released a sporty version of the fourth-generation Vitara called the Vitara S or Vitara Sport in some markets in December 2015. The Vitara S features a 1.4-litre K14C Boosterjet turbocharged petrol engine, which delivers 140 PS (103 kW; 138 bhp) and 220 N⋅m (162 lb⋅ft), 20 percent more power and 40 percent more torque over the standard 1.6-litre petrol engine. The engine is shared with the 2017 Swift Sport and paired to a 6-speed automatic transmission as standard. It was first available in 4WD "AllGrip" only until summer 2016 and after that again since 2017; starting with autumn 2016 the 2WD system is available for the S variant. The Vitara S also comes with several cosmetic changes over other Vitara trim levels including leather/suede sports seats with red stitching, aluminum sports pedals, red LED headlamp surrounds, distinctive five-slotted grille and black alloy wheels.

In April 2016, a new twin clutch automated manual transmission with hydraulically controlled clutch and gear change called TCSS (Twin Clutch System by Suzuki) was added to the line up in Europe. It is only available for the Fiat-powered 1.6-litre turbo-diesel engine with all-wheel drive configuration.

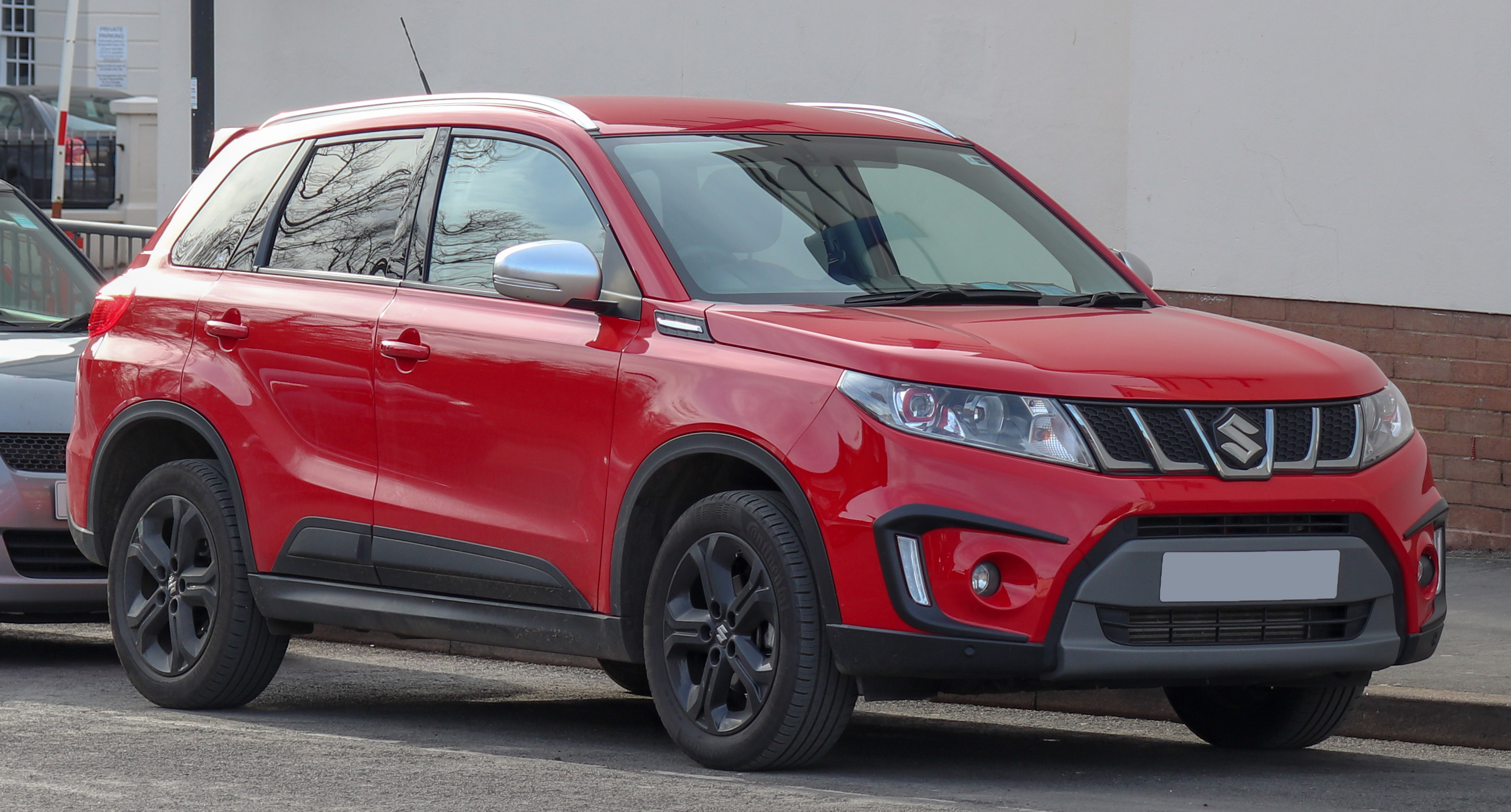
Suzuki Vitara S

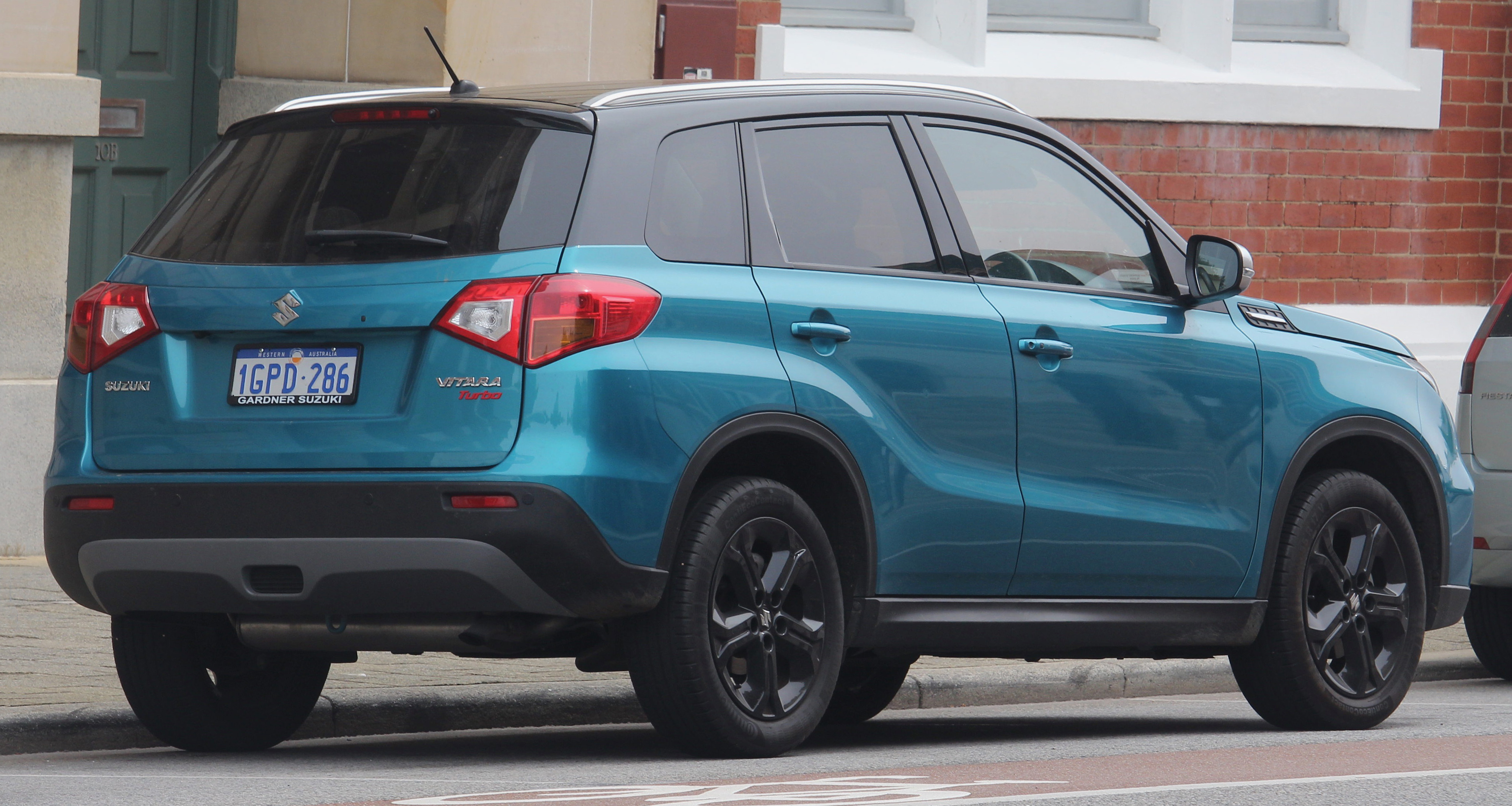
Rear view

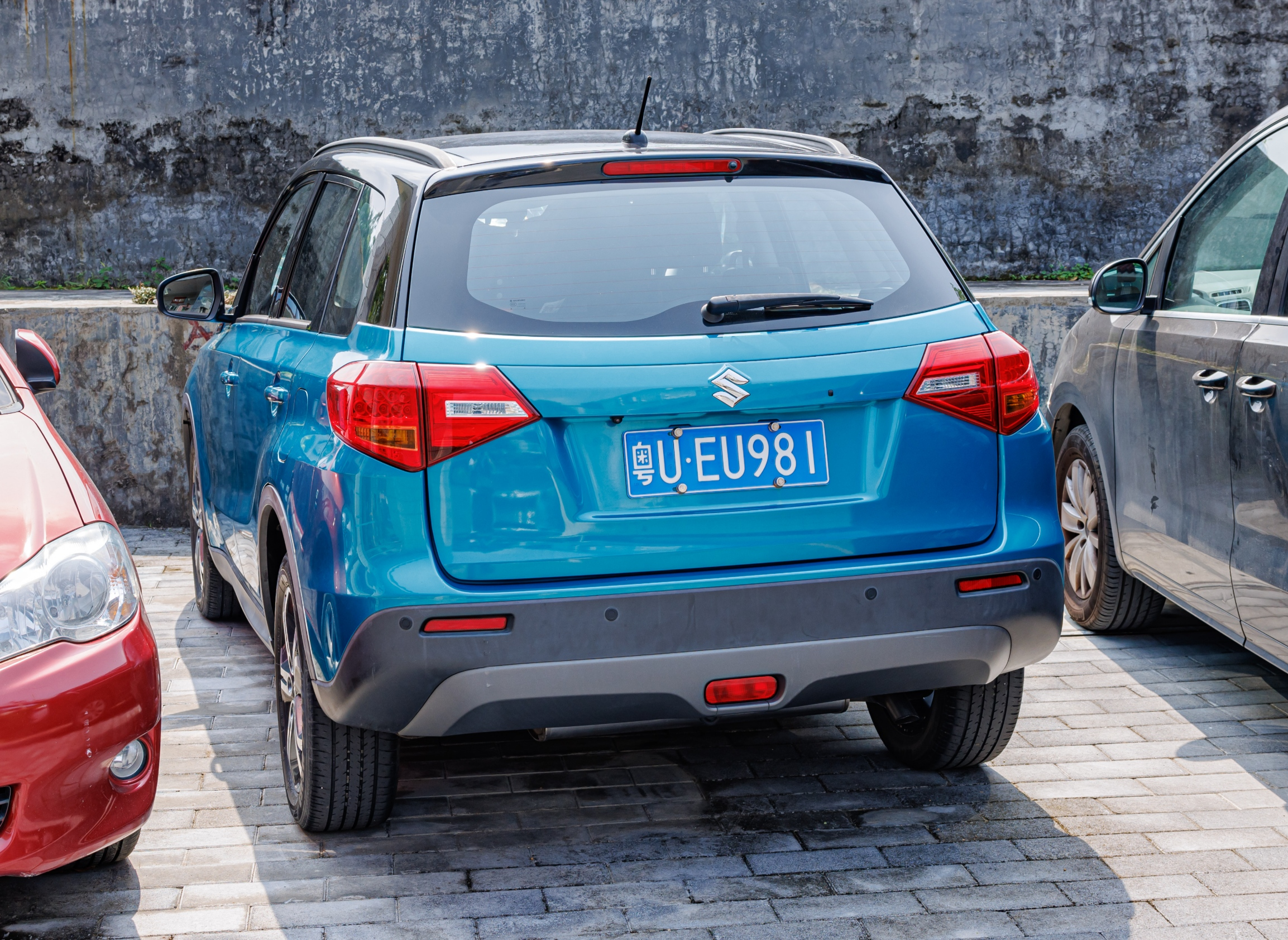
Chinese market Changan Suzuki Vitara with slightly different taillights

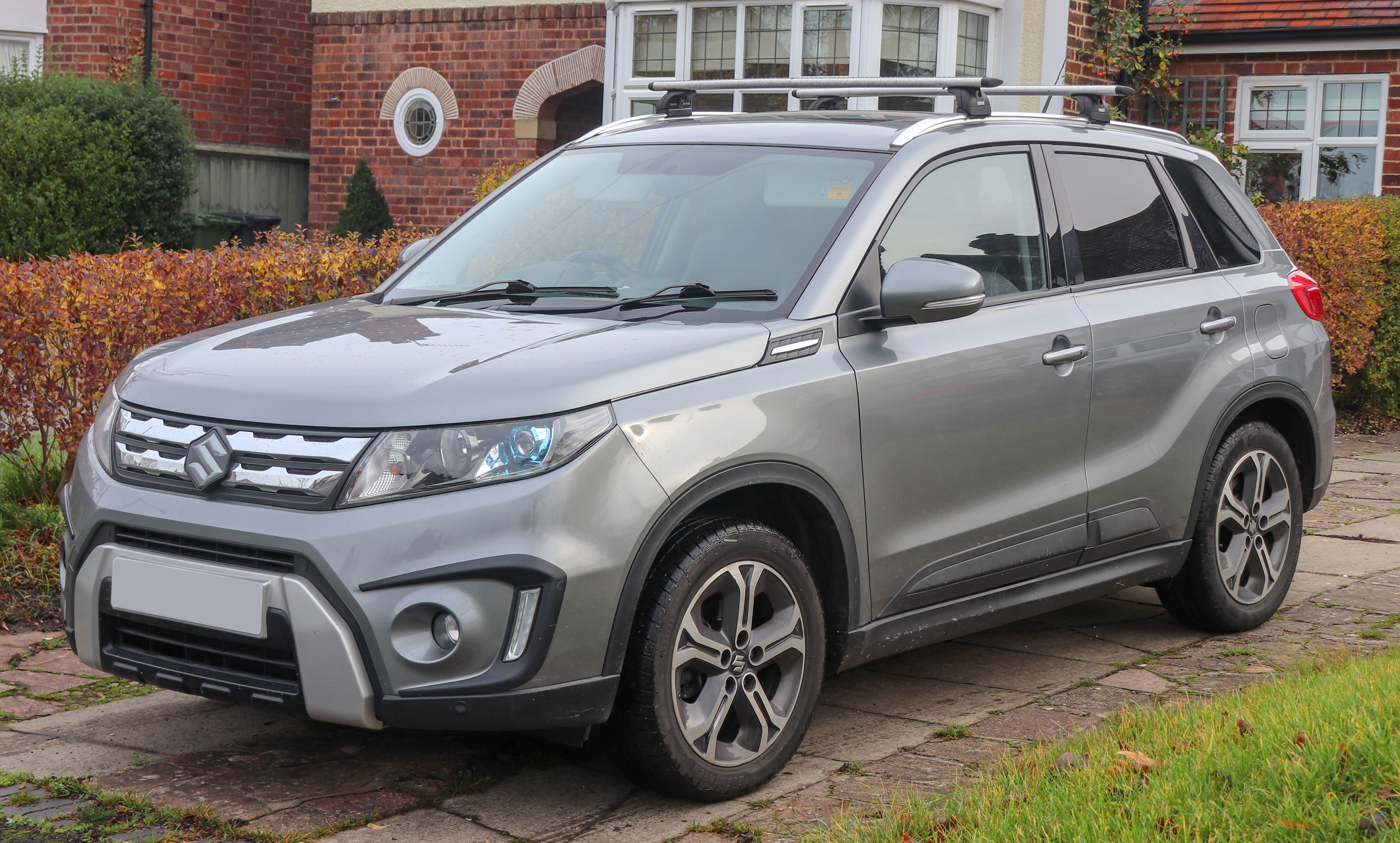
Vitara Rugged Pack

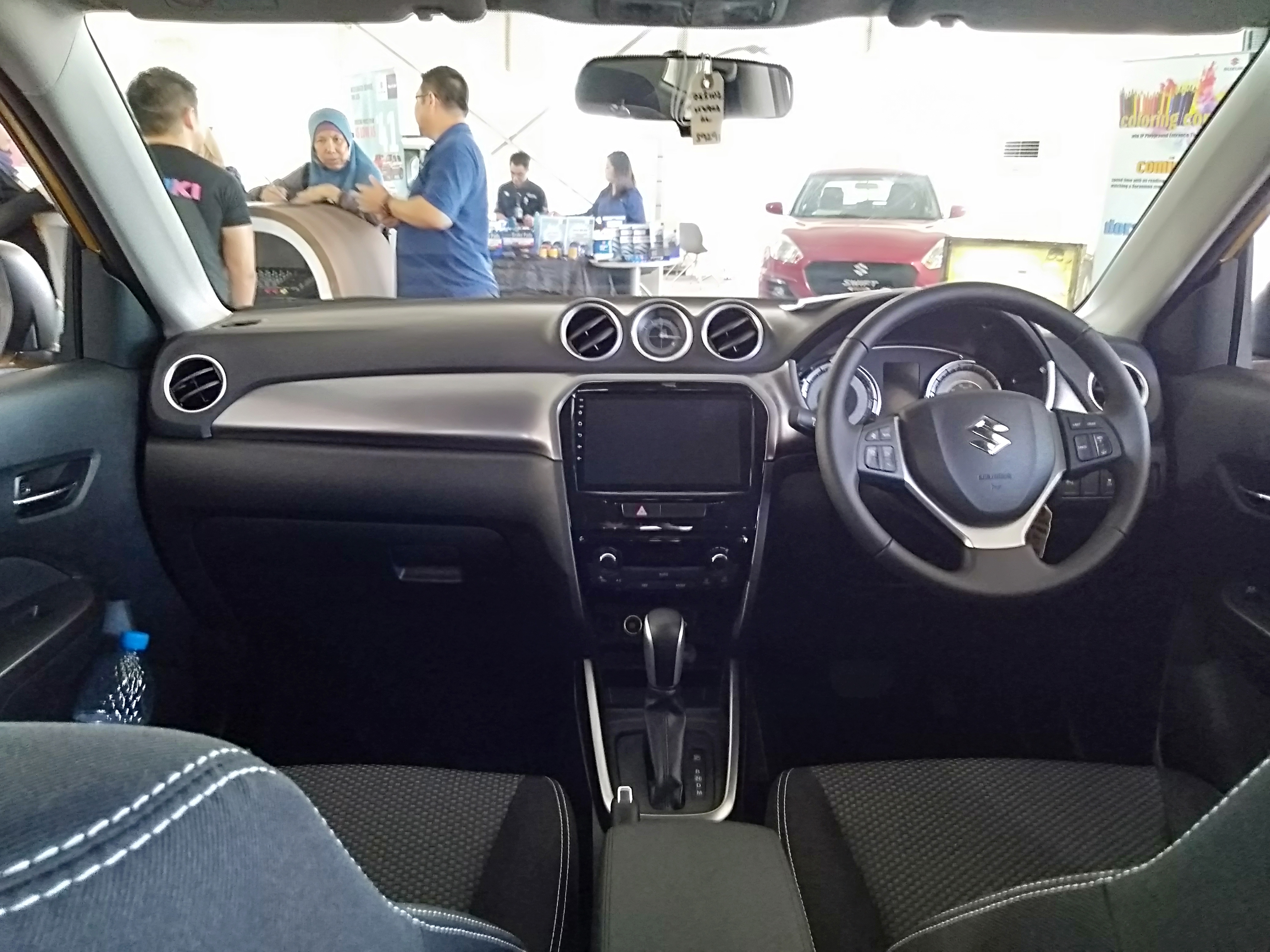
Interior

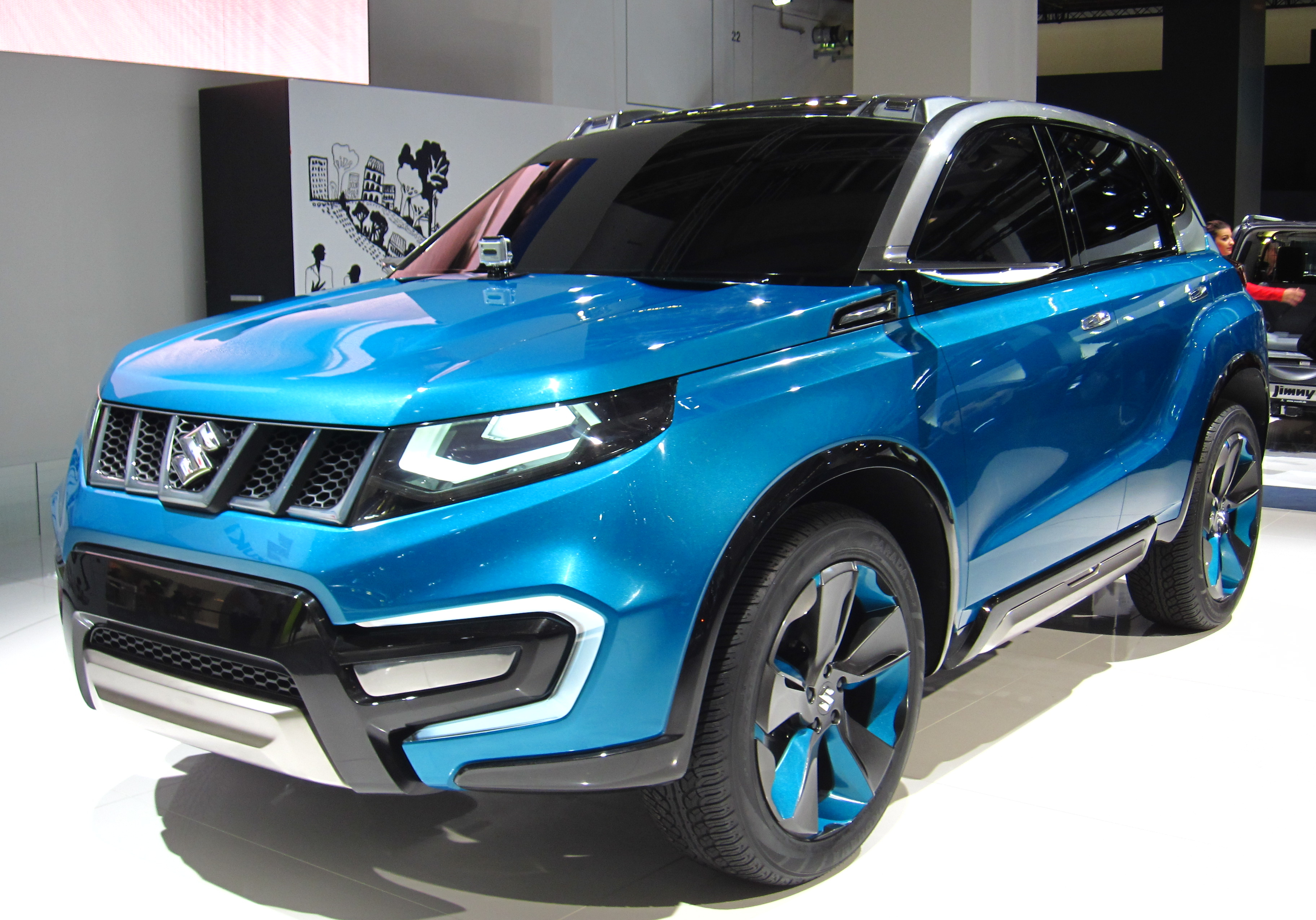
Suzuki iV-4 concept

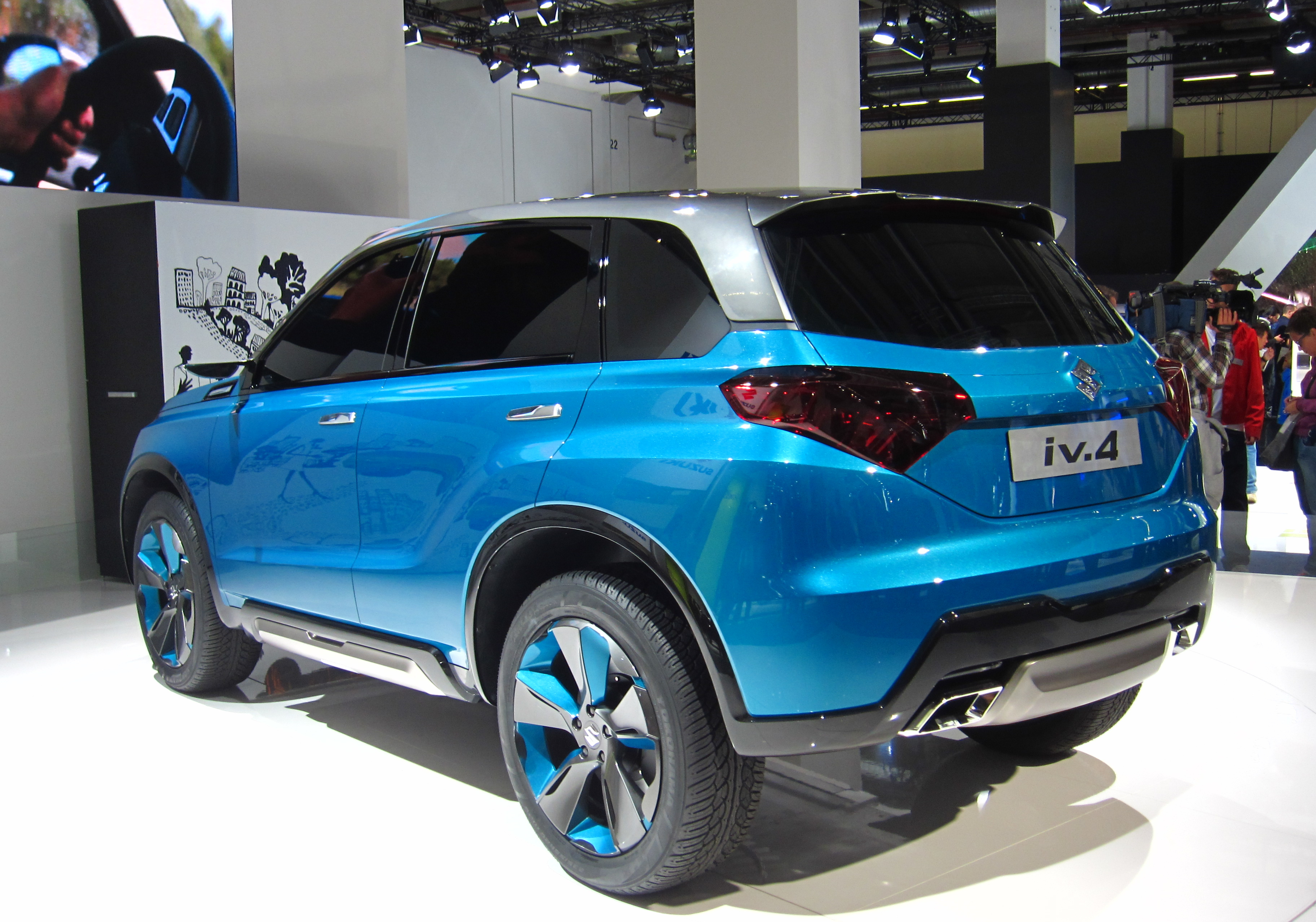
Suzuki iV-4 concept

=== Facelifts ===
Suzuki unveiled a renewed version of the Vitara at the 2018 Paris Motor Show in milestone of its 30th anniversary in 2018. Changes include a heightened front bumper to give space for the millimeter-wave radar at the front. The conventional digital multi-information display was replaced with a 4.2" colour LCD MID. Like the Jimny and Swift, Suzuki Safety Support was also adopted for the model which includes a collision avoidance system (called Dual Sensor Brake Support (DSBS)) and a traffic sign recognition function. The M16A 1.6-litre naturally aspirated petrol engine is also replaced with a new K10C Boosterjet 1.0-litre three-cylinder turbocharged petrol engine in Europe.

Starting from March 2020, all engine for European market Vitara was replaced by a new Euro 6d compliant "K14D Boosterjet" 1.4-litre turbocharged petrol engine with a 48V mild hybrid technology, coupled to a belt-driven Integrated Starter Generator (ISG), which delivers 129 PS (95 kW; 127 bhp) and 235 N⋅m (173 lb⋅ft). The ISG electric motor produces 14 PS (10 kW; 14 bhp) and 53 N⋅m (39 lb⋅ft).

Another facelift was introduced in April 2024 with redesigned front bumper, new sets of dual tone wheels, larger rear upper spoiler, a bigger 9-inch LCD screen and an advanced collision avoidance system Dual Sensor Brake Support II (DSBS II).

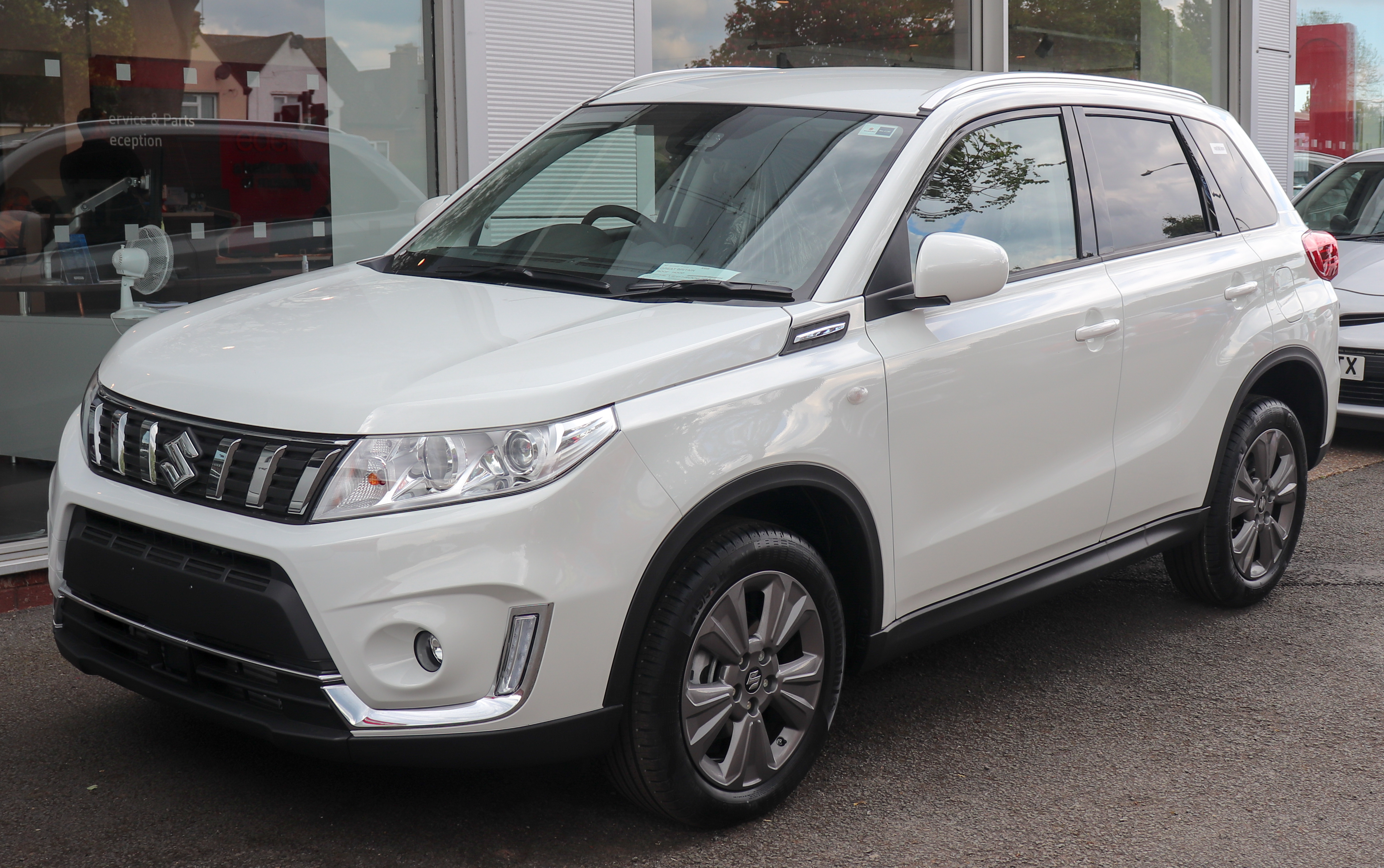
2018 Vitara facelift

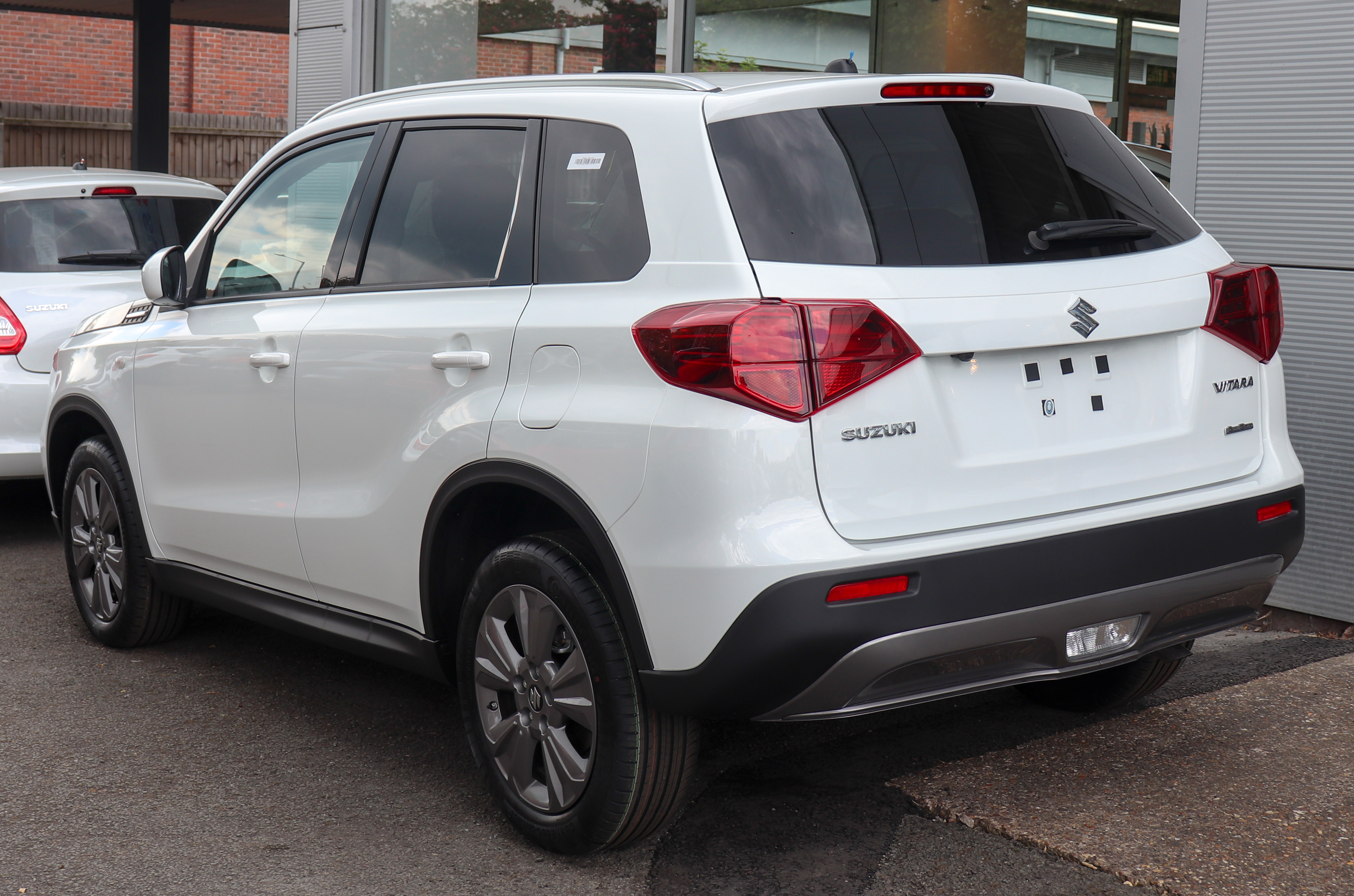
Rear view

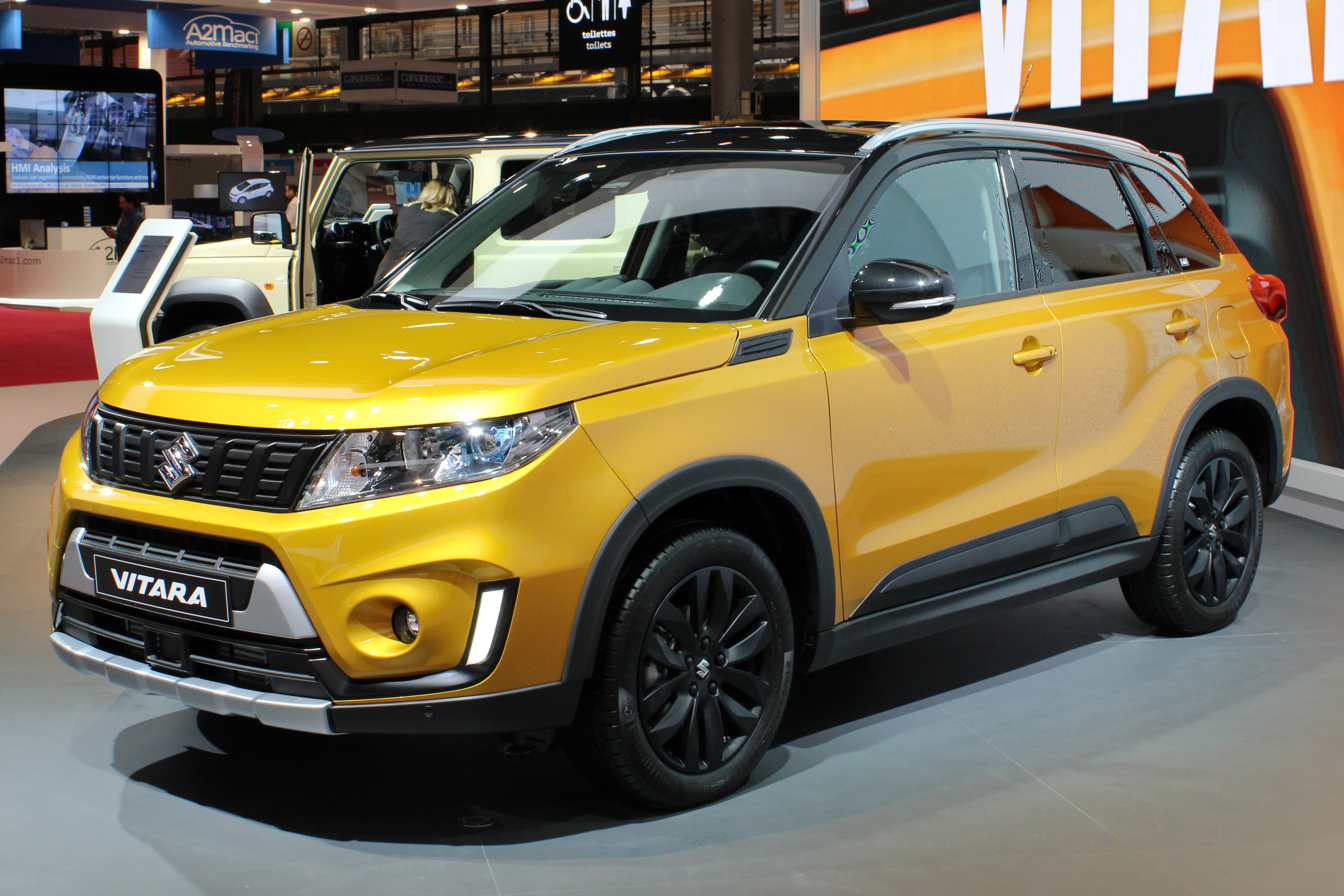
Vitara Rugged Pack

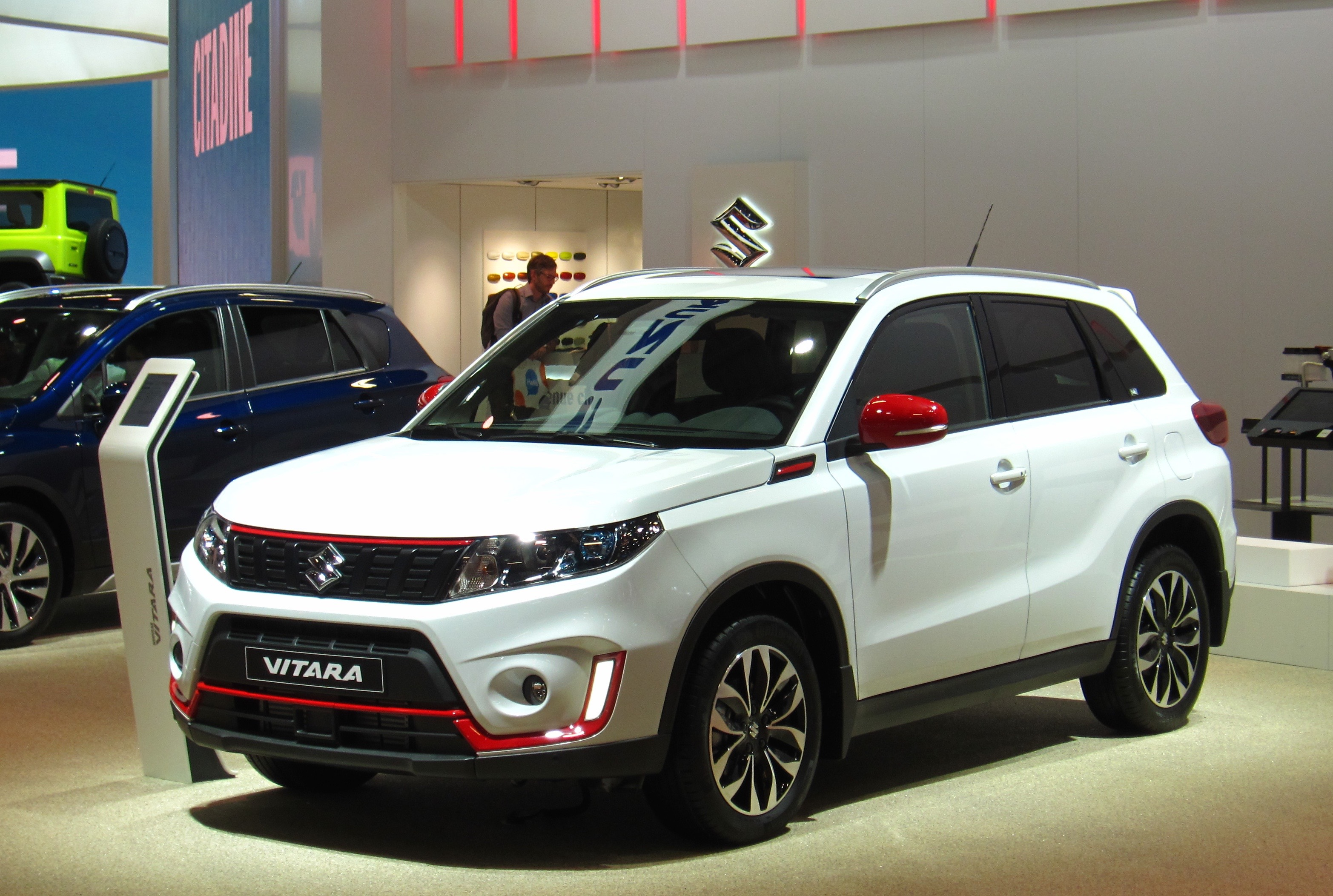
Vitara Urban Pack

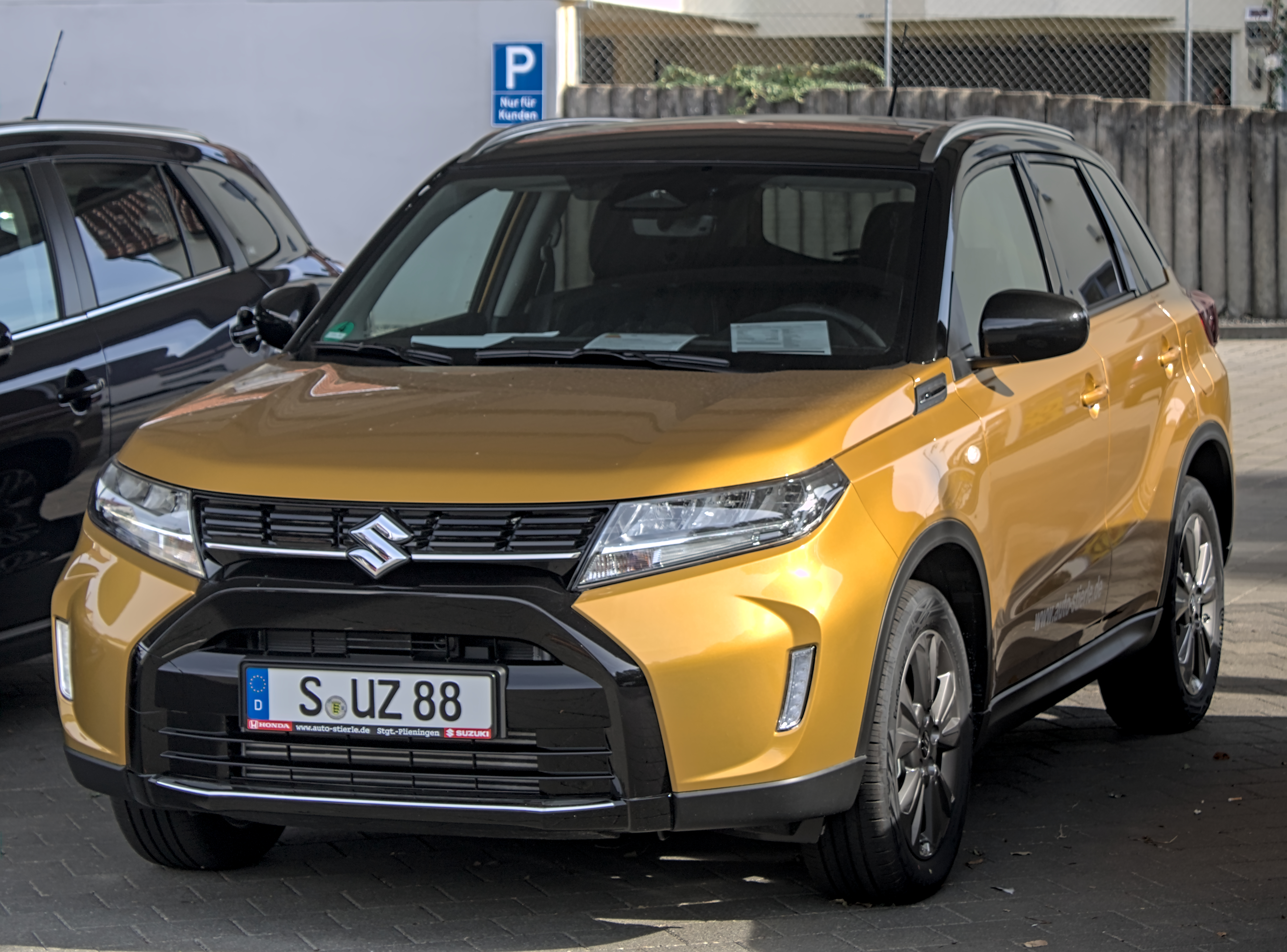
2024 Vitara facelift

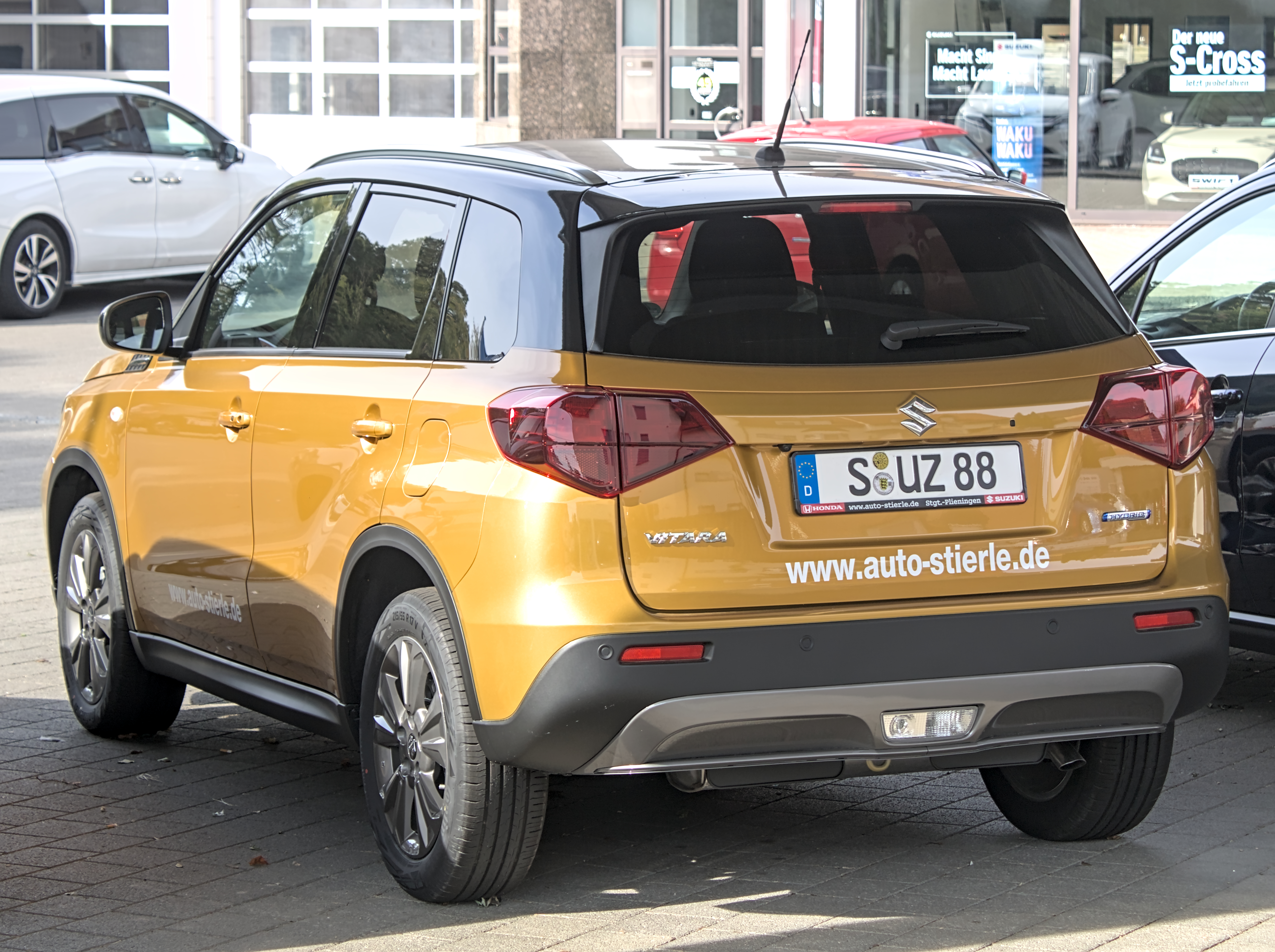
Rear view

==== Full hybrid ====
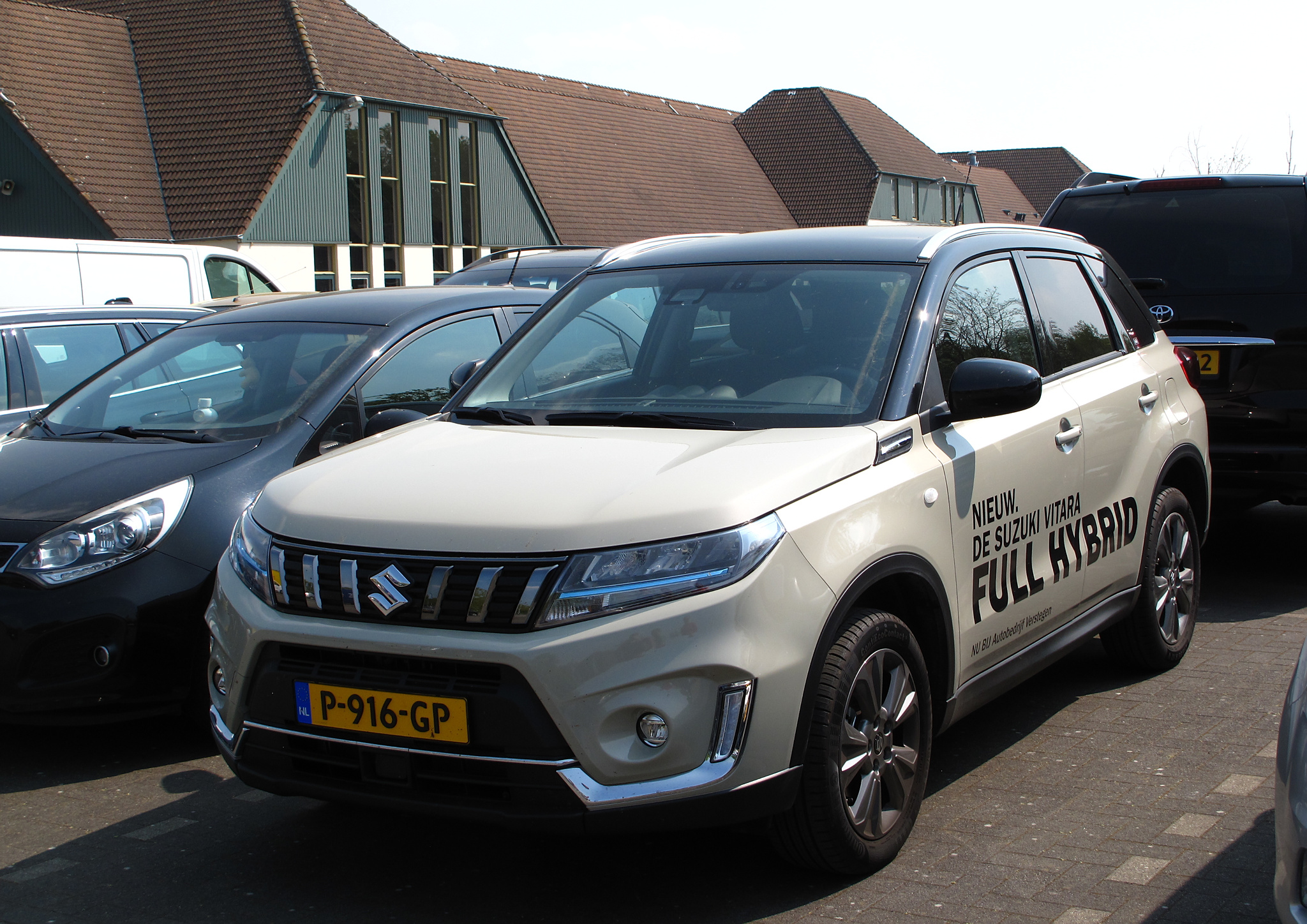
2022 Suzuki Vitara Full Hybrid

In January 2022, Suzuki released a 140V full hybrid variant of Vitara in selected countries in Europe such as Hungary, France, Poland and the Netherlands, other European countries such as United Kingdom and Ireland received this model in March. The strong hybrid model was released in Japan as the Escudo in April 2022, which after the nameplate's temporary discontinuation in September 2021, as the conventional petrol model is no longer offered in the Japanese market.

It is powered with a new dual-injector 1.5-litre petrol engine called K15C Dualjet, a reworked version of the K15B engine. The engine is combined with a Motor Generator Unit (MGU) electric motor, which produces 33 PS (24 kW; 33 bhp) and 60 N⋅m (44 lb⋅ft). The combined power of the petrol engine and the electric motor is 115 PS (85 kW; 113 bhp). This hybrid model is only available with a 6-speed automated manual (dubbed as Auto Gear Shift (AGS) by Suzuki) and available for both front-wheel and all-wheel drive configuration. Due to the placement of battery pack in the boot, as a result, the capacity is decreased to 289-litre and 569-litre when rear seats folded.

The full hybrid model was discontinued in Japan in April 2024, replaced by the smaller Fronx mild hybrid crossover. However, it was still available in Europe until around late 2025 or early 2026, succeeded by a lower output version of the earlier 1.4-litre Boosterjet turbocharged mild hybrid engine.

=== Limited and special editions ===
In August 2018, Changan Suzuki launched a special edition Vitara called "Star Edition (星耀版)" for Chinese market. It comes with rose gold coloured body, headlights, interior and new grille design. It is only available with 1.4-litre turbocharged petrol engine.

A limited edition called "Vitara Katana" was introduced for Italian market in November 2019. This limited edition Vitara pays tribute to the new Suzuki Katana 1000 sport bike. It is based on the 1.0-litre Boosterjet model with manual transmission and can be ordered with front-wheel drive, or with the renowned Suzuki AllGrip all-wheel drive system. Austrian market also received similar limited edition in September 2020, but based on the 1.4-litre Boosterjet hybrid AllGrip model. Both available in Metallic Silver or Black colours and limited to 100 units.

In Japan, a special edition for Escudo called "S Limited" was announced in November 2020. This special edition has similar concept like the Chinese market Vitara Stars Edition, but with brown coloured headlights, interior, wheels and silver stainless steel pedal.

=== Powertrain ===
Engines
Type	Model	Engine code	Displacement	Power	Torque	Combined system output	Electric motor	Battery	Transmission	Top speed	0–100 km/h (0–62 mph)	Layout	Cal. years
Petrol	1.0 Boosterjet	K10C	998 cc (1.0 L) I3 turbo	82 kW (110 hp; 111 PS) @ 5,500	160 N⋅m (16.3 kg⋅m; 118 lb⋅ft) @ 1,800–4,000	-	-	-	5-speed manual	170–180 km/h (106–112 mph)	11.5–12.5 s	FWD; AWD (AllGrip)	
Petrol	1.0 Boosterjet	K10C	998 cc (1.0 L) I3 turbo	82 kW (110 hp; 111 PS) @ 5,500	160 N⋅m (16.3 kg⋅m; 118 lb⋅ft) @ 1,800–4,000	-	-	-	5-speed manual	170–180 km/h (106–112 mph)	11.5–12.5 s	FWD; AWD (AllGrip)	2018–2020
Petrol	1.4 Boosterjet	K14C	1,372 cc (1.4 L) I4 turbo	103 kW (138 hp; 140 PS) @ 5,500	220 N⋅m (22.4 kg⋅m; 162 lb⋅ft) @ 1,500	-	-	-	6-speed manual/automatic	200 km/h (124 mph)	8.5 s	FWD; AWD (AllGrip)	
Petrol	1.4 Boosterjet	K14C	1,372 cc (1.4 L) I4 turbo	103 kW (138 hp; 140 PS) @ 5,500	220 N⋅m (22.4 kg⋅m; 162 lb⋅ft) @ 1,500	-	-	-	6-speed manual/automatic	200 km/h (124 mph)	8.5 s	FWD; AWD (AllGrip)	2015–2025
Petrol mild hybrid	1.4 Boosterjet	K14D	1,372 cc (1.4 L) I4 turbo	95 kW (127 hp; 129 PS) @ 5,500 + 10 kW (13 hp; 14 PS) motor @ 3,000	235 N⋅m (24.0 kg⋅m; 173 lb⋅ft) @ 2,000–3,000 + 53 N⋅m (5 kg⋅m; 39 lb⋅ft) motor @ 500	-	48V WA06B DC synchronous motor	8Ah Lithium-ion	6-speed manual/automatic	190 km/h (118 mph)	9.5 s	FWD; AWD (AllGrip)	
Petrol mild hybrid	1.4 Boosterjet	K14D	1,372 cc (1.4 L) I4 turbo	95 kW (127 hp; 129 PS) @ 5,500 + 10 kW (13 hp; 14 PS) motor @ 3,000	235 N⋅m (24.0 kg⋅m; 173 lb⋅ft) @ 2,000–3,000 + 53 N⋅m (5 kg⋅m; 39 lb⋅ft) motor @ 500	-	48V WA06B DC synchronous motor	8Ah Lithium-ion	6-speed manual/automatic	190 km/h (118 mph)	9.5 s	FWD; AWD (AllGrip)	2018–present
Petrol mild hybrid	1.4 Boosterjet	K14D	1,372 cc (1.4 L) I4 turbo	81 kW (109 hp; 110 PS) @ 4,500 + 12 kW (16 hp; 16 PS) motor @ 5,800–6,500	235 N⋅m (24.0 kg⋅m; 173 lb⋅ft) @ 2,000–3,000 + 50 N⋅m (5 kg⋅m; 37 lb⋅ft) motor @ 1,500	-	48V WA06C DC synchronous motor	8Ah Lithium-ion	6-speed automatic	180 km/h (112 mph)	10.1 s	FWD; AWD (AllGrip)	
Petrol mild hybrid	1.4 Boosterjet	K14D	1,372 cc (1.4 L) I4 turbo	81 kW (109 hp; 110 PS) @ 4,500 + 12 kW (16 hp; 16 PS) motor @ 5,800–6,500	235 N⋅m (24.0 kg⋅m; 173 lb⋅ft) @ 2,000–3,000 + 50 N⋅m (5 kg⋅m; 37 lb⋅ft) motor @ 1,500	-	48V WA06C DC synchronous motor	8Ah Lithium-ion	6-speed automatic	180 km/h (112 mph)	10.1 s	FWD; AWD (AllGrip)	2025–present
Petrol hybrid	1.5 Dualjet	K15C	1,462 cc (1.5 L) I4	74 kW (99 hp; 101 PS) @ 6,000 + 24 kW (32 hp; 33 PS) motor	138 N⋅m (14.1 kg⋅m; 102 lb⋅ft) @ 4,400 + 60 N⋅m (6 kg⋅m; 44 lb⋅ft) motor	86 kW (115 hp; 117 PS)	140 V PB03A AC synchronous motor	0.84 kWh (3.0 MJ) 6Ah Lithium-ion	6-speed AMT (AGS)	180 km/h (112 mph)	13.5 s	FWD; AWD (AllGrip)	
Petrol hybrid	1.5 Dualjet	K15C	1,462 cc (1.5 L) I4	74 kW (99 hp; 101 PS) @ 6,000 + 24 kW (32 hp; 33 PS) motor	138 N⋅m (14.1 kg⋅m; 102 lb⋅ft) @ 4,400 + 60 N⋅m (6 kg⋅m; 44 lb⋅ft) motor	86 kW (115 hp; 117 PS)	140 V PB03A AC synchronous motor	0.84 kWh (3.0 MJ) 6Ah Lithium-ion	6-speed AMT (AGS)	180 km/h (112 mph)	13.5 s	FWD; AWD (AllGrip)	2022–2026
Petrol	1.6 VVT	M16A	1,586 cc (1.6 L) I4	88 kW (118 hp; 120 PS) @ 6,000	156 N⋅m (15.9 kg⋅m; 115 lb⋅ft) @ 4,400	-	-	-	5-speed manual 6-speed automatic	180 km/h (112 mph)	11.5–12.5 s	FWD; AWD (AllGrip)	
Petrol	1.6 VVT	M16A	1,586 cc (1.6 L) I4	88 kW (118 hp; 120 PS) @ 6,000	156 N⋅m (15.9 kg⋅m; 115 lb⋅ft) @ 4,400	-	-	-	5-speed manual 6-speed automatic	180 km/h (112 mph)	11.5–12.5 s	FWD; AWD (AllGrip)	2015–2025
Diesel	1.6 DDiS	D16A	1,598 cc (1.6 L) I4	88 kW (118 hp; 120 PS) @ 3,750	320 N⋅m (32.6 kg⋅m; 236 lb⋅ft) @ 1,750	-	-	-	6-speed manual/DCT (TCSS)	180 km/h (112 mph)	11.5 s	FWD; AWD (AllGrip)	
Diesel	1.6 DDiS	D16A	1,598 cc (1.6 L) I4	88 kW (118 hp; 120 PS) @ 3,750	320 N⋅m (32.6 kg⋅m; 236 lb⋅ft) @ 1,750	-	-	-	6-speed manual/DCT (TCSS)	180 km/h (112 mph)	11.5 s	FWD; AWD (AllGrip)	2015–2018

=== Sales ===
Year	Europe	China	Mexico	Australia
2015	43,247	4,450		
2016	73,099	41,175		
2017	72,301	27,305		
2018	67,801	13,222		
2019	81,860	3,717	6,632	5,253
2020	43,727	103	4,681	4,332
2021	57,436		3,513	3,742

=== Safety ===
Global NCAP 1.0 test results (India) Maruti Suzuki Vitara Brezza – 2 Airbags (2018, similar to Latin NCAP 2013)
Test	Score	Stars
Adult occupant protection	12.51/17.00	4 /5 stars
Child occupant protection	17.93/49.00	2 /5 stars

Euro NCAP 2015 Suzuki Vitara
Euro NCAP Safety Rating	5/5 stars
Adult Occupant	89%
Child Occupant	85%
Pedestrian	76%
Safety Assists	75%

ANCAP test results Suzuki Vitara (2015)
Test	Score
Overall	5 /5 stars
Frontal offset	14.79/16
Side impact	16/16
Pole	2/2
Seat belt reminders	3/3
Whiplash protection	Good
Pedestrian protection	Good
Electronic stability control	Standard

== Nameplate usage ==
=== Vitara Brezza ===
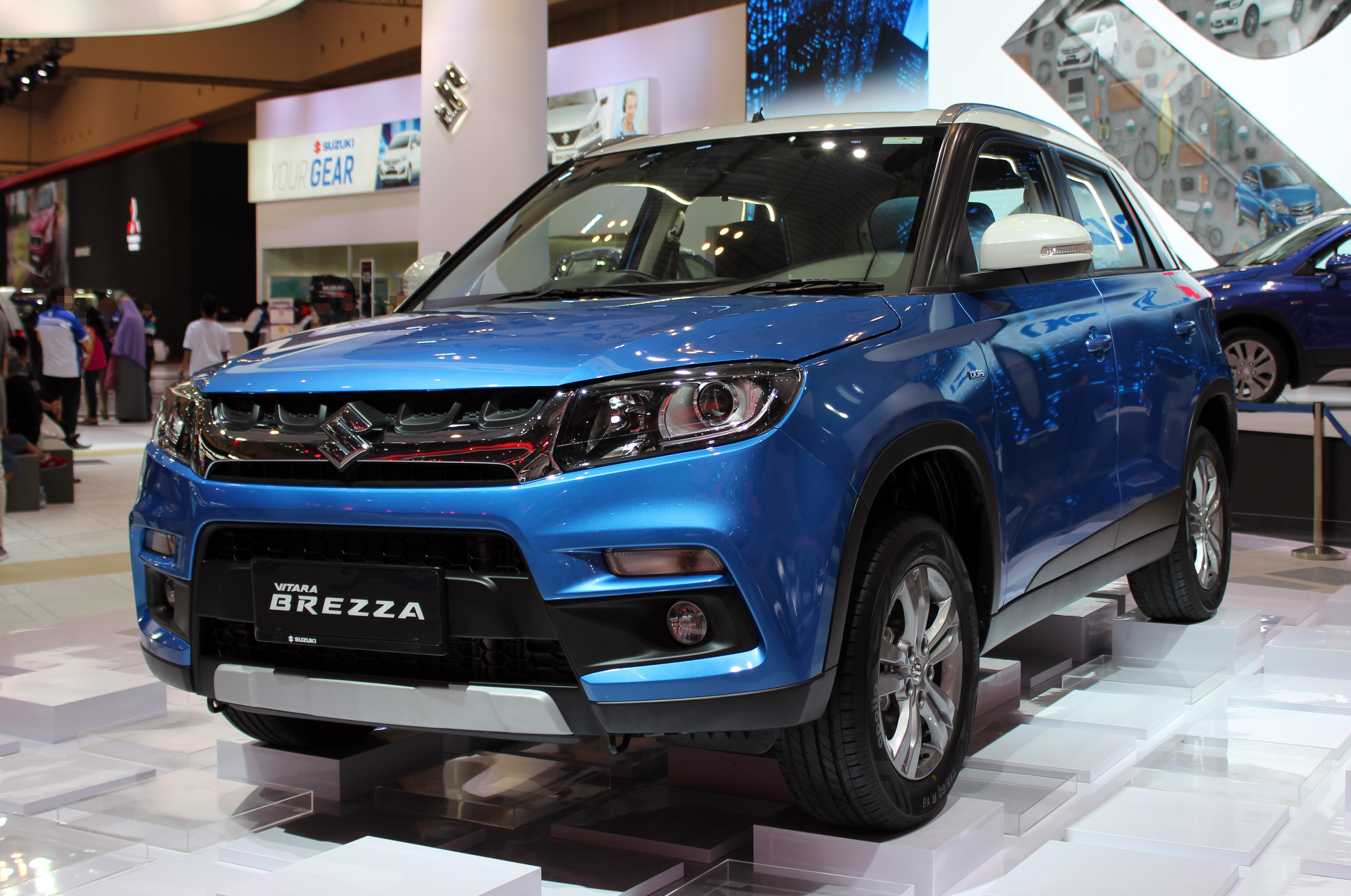
2016 Vitara Brezza

In 2016, Suzuki released a smaller derivative of the fourth-generation Vitara destined for the Indian market as the Vitara Brezza, which occupied the sub-4-metre SUV segment in the country. The model was only produced in India with right-hand drive configuration. It was renamed to simply Brezza since the second-generation model.

=== Grand Vitara ===
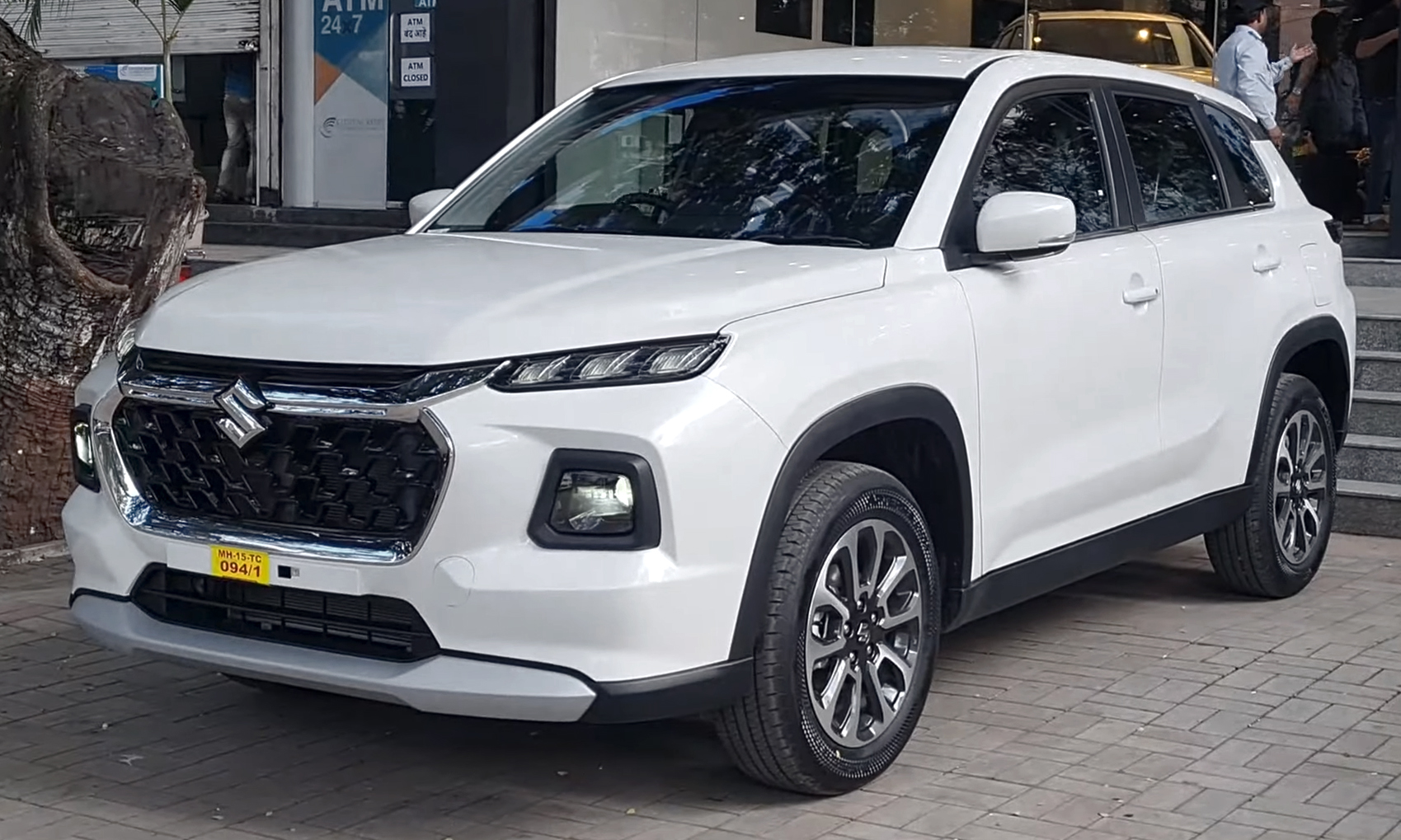
2022 Grand Vitara

The 2022 model, based on the lengthened fourth-generation Vitara's platform, was introduced in India in July 2022 and marketed as the "Grand Vitara". It replaced the S-Cross in the Indian market, which also sit on the same platform and segment. It is also sold under Toyota badge as the Urban Cruiser Hyryder. It will be exported to selected developing markets in Asia, Africa, Middle East (GCC countries) and Latin America.

=== e Vitara ===
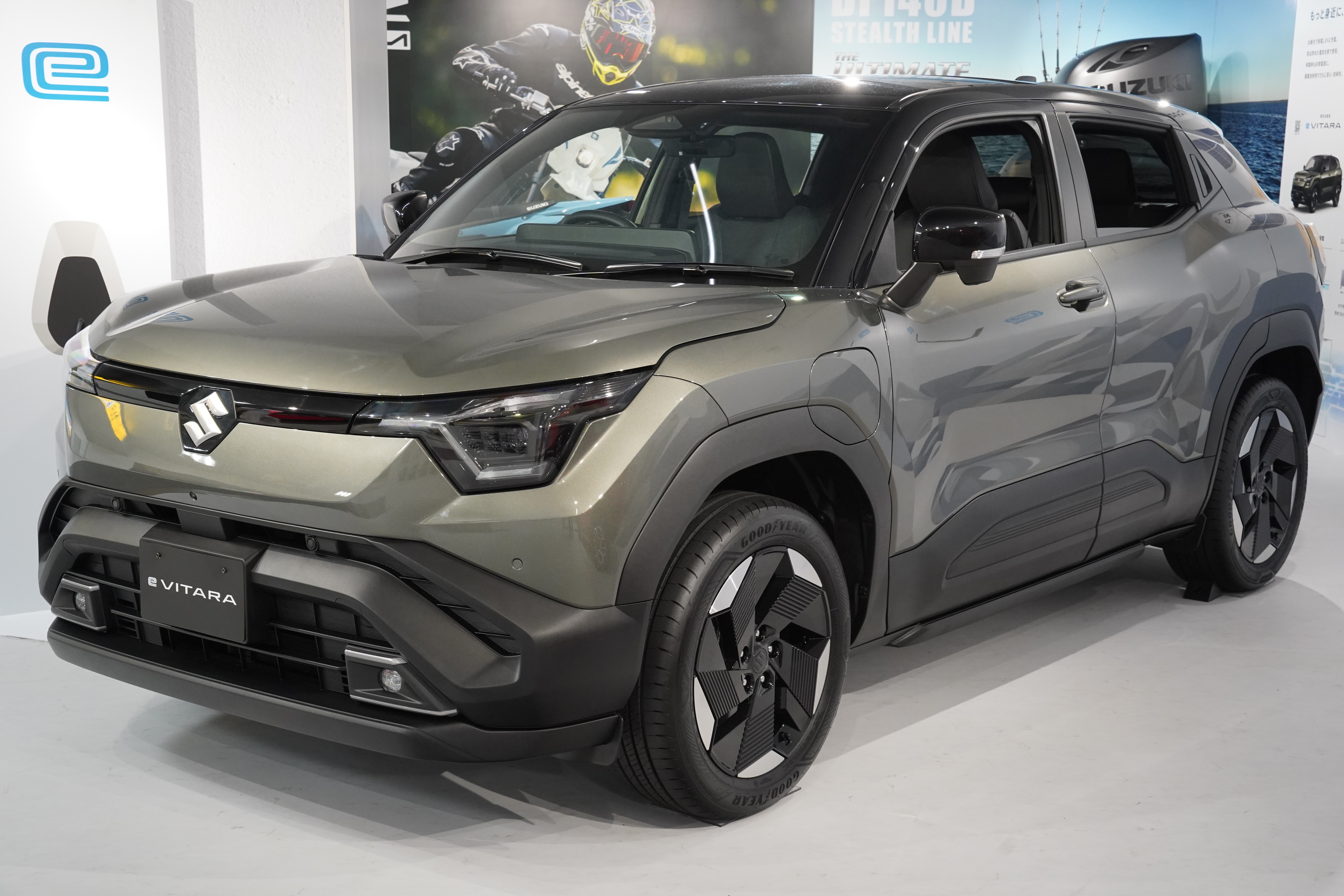
2025 e Vitara

The Vitara nameplate has been used since 2024 for a battery electric vehicle called the e Vitara. It is the mass production version of the eVX concept, which was showcased first in India in 2023.

== General Motors versions ==
A rebadged version was sold in North America by General Motors as the Chevrolet Tracker for the first two generations. In Latin America - (excluding Mexico and several other countries), it was marketed as Chevrolet Vitara (first generation 3-door) or Chevrolet Grand Vitara (second generation 5-door). The first generation was also sold with various General Motors' brands in North America such as the Geo Tracker and the Canadian market exclusive Asüna Sunrunner, GMC Tracker and Pontiac Sunrunner.

The last General Motors branded Vitara was the third generation model for Ecuadorian market called Chevrolet Grand Vitara SZ. Even though the car was sold and distributed through Chevrolet, it was marketed with Suzuki badge. The "SZ" suffix was added because the previous generation Chevrolet Grand Vitara was still available in the country until 2016.

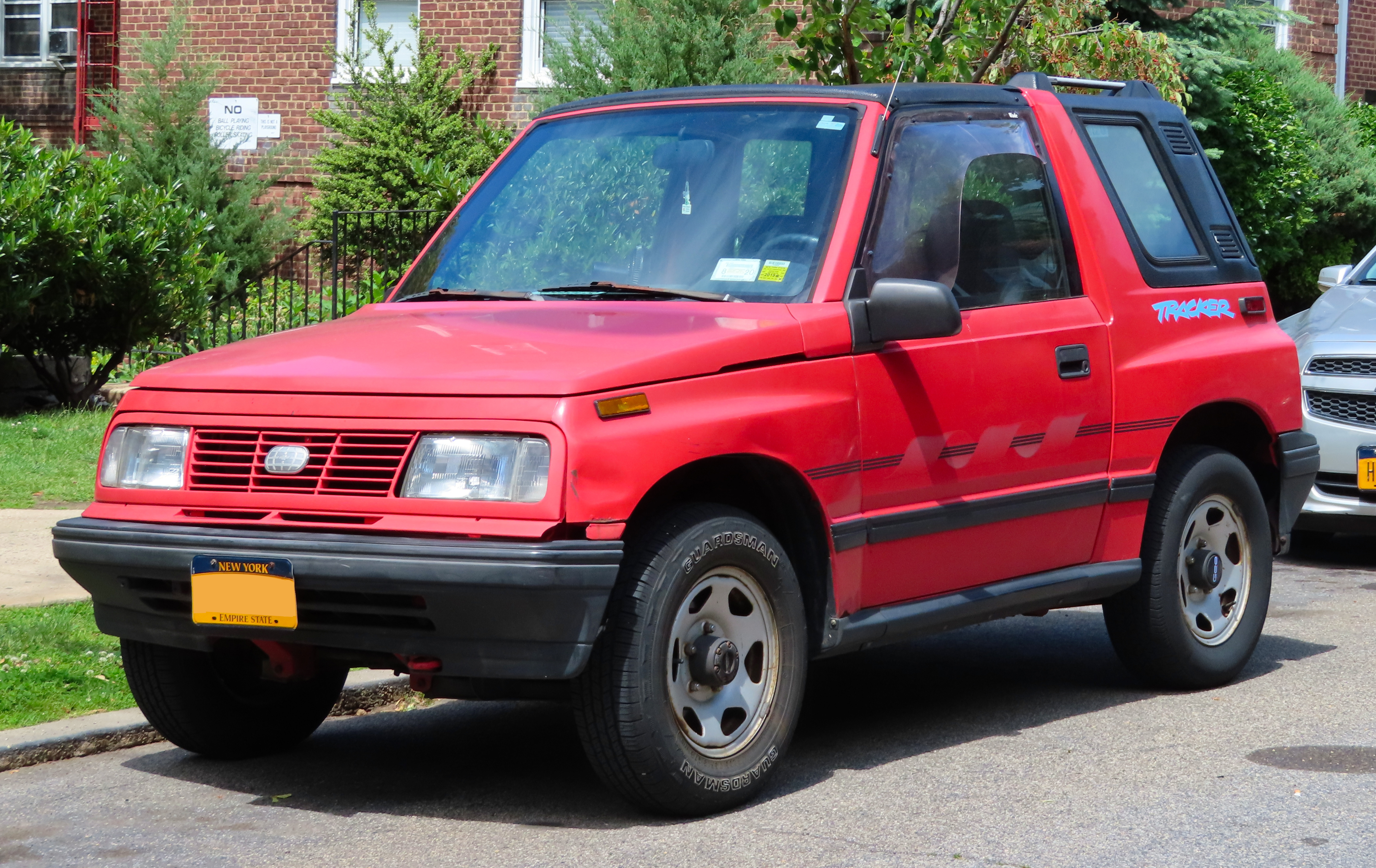
1994 Geo Tracker

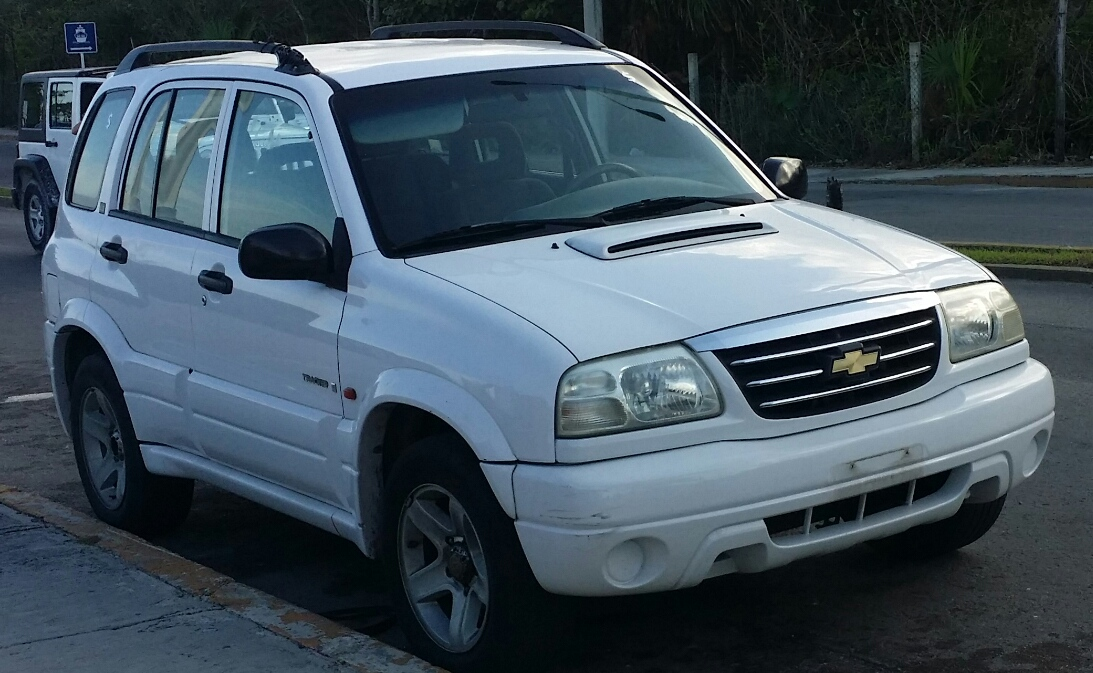
Chevrolet Tracker 5-door (Mexico)

== Motorsports ==
In 1994, Suzuki built a twin-engined Escudo to compete in hillclimbing. It featured two heavily modified turbocharged 1.6-litre G16B (with G13B DOHC cylinder head) inline-four engines – one at the front driving the front wheels and one at the rear driving the rear wheels – with a combined power output of 900 PS (662 kW; 888 hp). The car had a curb weight of 900 kg (1,984 lb). Driven by Nobuhiro "Monster" Tajima, it finished fifth overall at the Pikes Peak International Hill Climb in 1994 and won the event outright in 1995, making Tajima the first Japanese driver to win the event.

For 1996, Suzuki produced a new Escudo for hillclimbing which had a single twin-turbocharged 2.0-litre H20A V6 engine with a power output of 600 PS (441 kW; 592 hp) and 70 kg⋅m (686 N⋅m; 506 lb⋅ft) of torque for the prototype version, the racing version has higher power output, produces 800 PS (588 kW; 789 hp) and 80 kg⋅m (785 N⋅m; 579 lb⋅ft). In 1997, Suzuki upgraded the Escudo with a bigger 2.5-litre H25A V6 engine with a power output of 995 PS (981 hp; 732 kW) at 8100 rpm and 95 kg⋅m (932 N⋅m; 687 lb⋅ft). It had four-wheel drive and weighed 800 kg (1,764 lb). Again, driven by Nobuhiro Tajima, it finished second overall at Pikes Peak in 1996, 1998 and 1999, and won the Queenstown Gold Rush International Hill Climb outright in 1998, 1999 and 2000.

A newer Escudo went on to win at Pikes Peak in 2006 and at Queenstown in 2004, 2005, 2006 and 2007.

Suzuki Vitara also participated in numerous cross country rally events around the world since the first generation, such as Dakar Rally, Australasian Safari, Asia Cross Country Rally and Transsyberia rally.

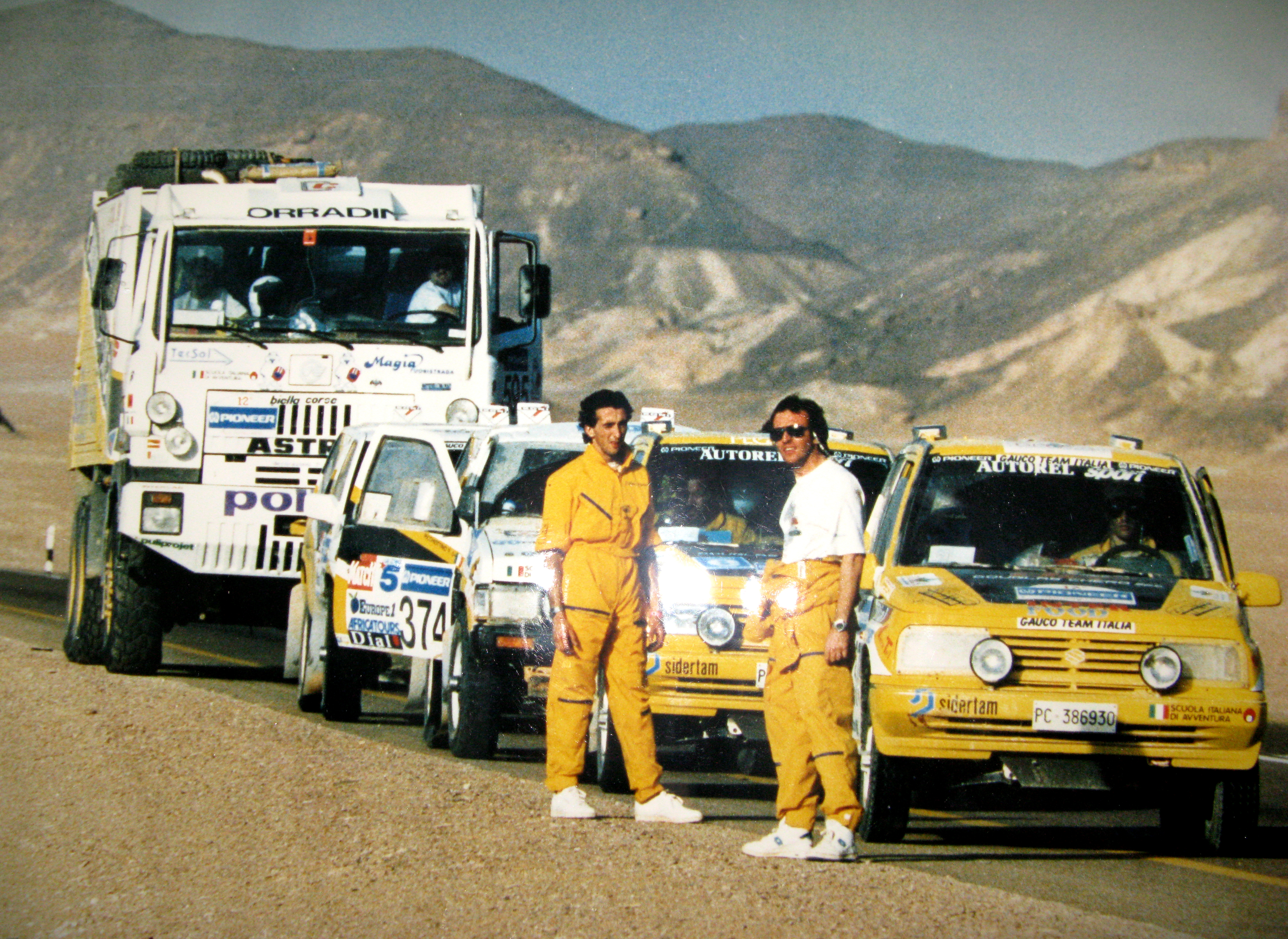
Suzuki Vitaras at the 1990 Paris Dakar

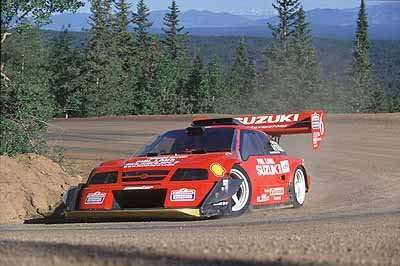
The V6 Escudo, which between 1996 and 2000 finished runner-up at Pikes Peak three times and won the Race to the Sky three times.

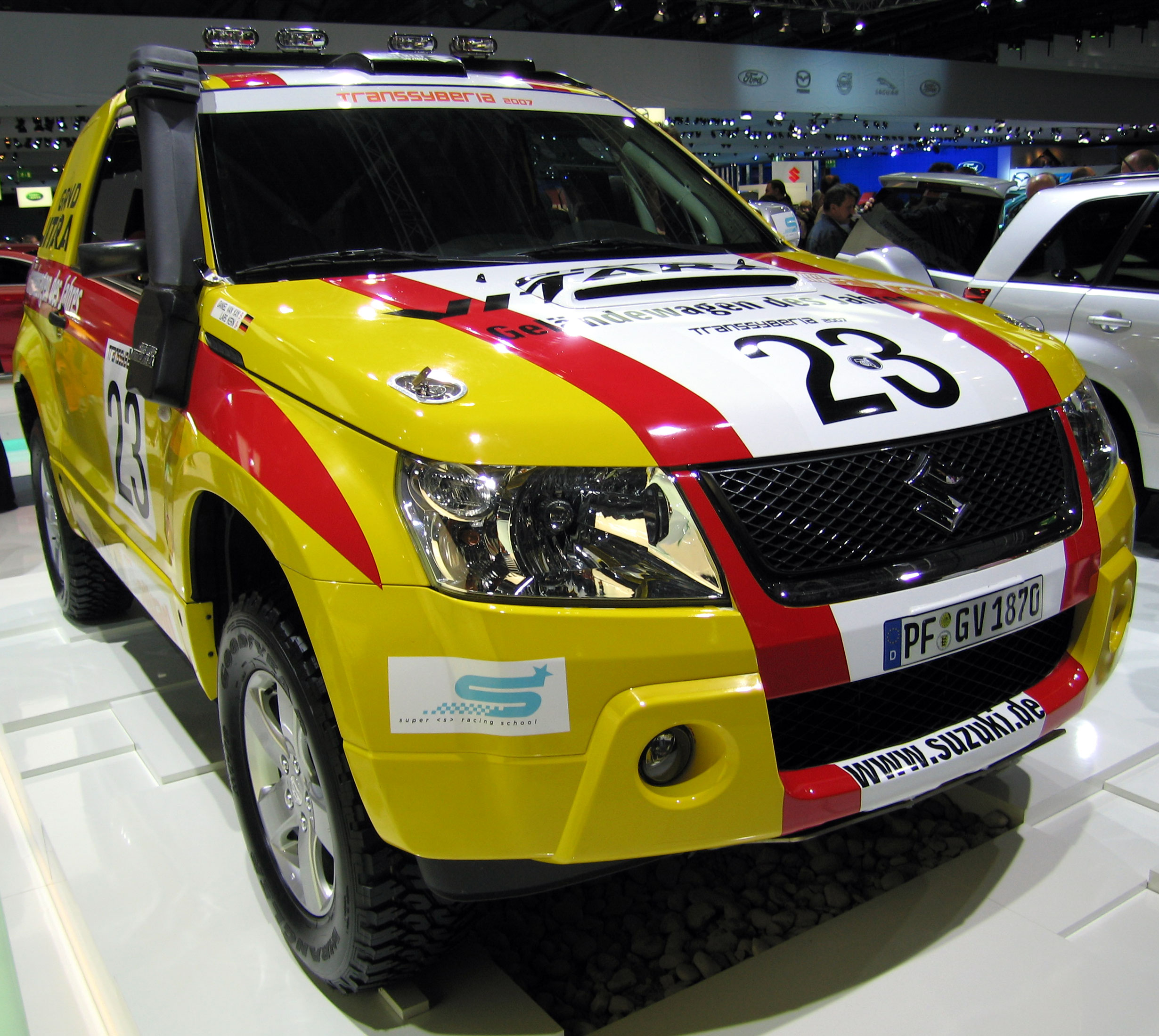
2007 Suzuki Grand Vitara Transsyberia rally car

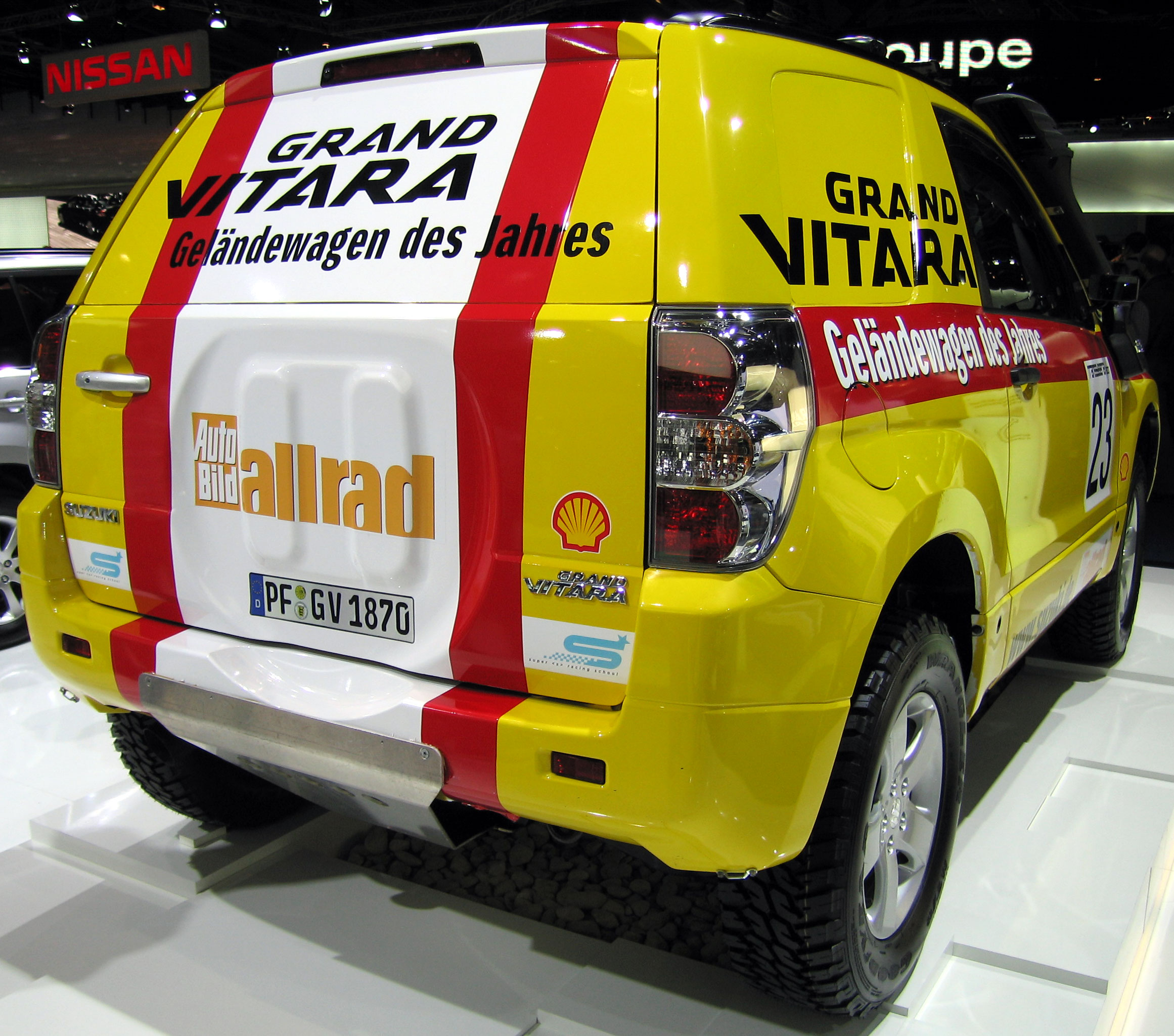
2007 Suzuki Grand Vitara Transsyberia rally car
