= Pontiac (automobile) =

Discontinued automobile brand owned by General Motors

- Type: Brand (1926–1931); Division (1931–2010)
- Industry: Automotive
- Founded: 1926; 100 years ago
- Founder: General Motors
- Defunct: October 31, 2010; 16 years ago
- Fate: Closed upon General Motors Chapter 11 reorganization
- Headquarters: Detroit, Michigan, U.S.
- Area served: United States, Canada, Mexico, Puerto Rico, U.S. Virgin Islands, Middle East
- Key people: Frank Hershey; Irving Jacob Reuter; Semon "Bunkie" Knudsen; John Z. DeLorean
- Products: Automobiles
- Parent: General Motors (1925–2010)
- Website: https://www.gm.com/heritage/collection/pontiac

Pontiac, formally the Pontiac Motor Division of General Motors, was an American automobile brand owned, manufactured, and commercialized by General Motors. It was introduced in 1926 as a companion make for GM's more expensive line of Oakland automobiles. Pontiac quickly overtook Oakland in popularity and supplanted its parent entirely by 1933, establishing its position as one of GM's dominant divisions.

Sold in the United States, Canada, and Mexico by GM, Pontiac came to represent affordable, practical transportation emphasizing performance. The division's name stems from the Odawa chieftain Pontiac, who led an indigenous uprising from 1763 until 1766 around Detroit, Michigan.

In the hierarchy of GM's five divisions, it slotted above Chevrolet but below Oldsmobile, Buick, and Cadillac. Starting with the 1959 models, marketing was focused on selling the lifestyle that the car's ownership promised rather than the car itself. By emphasizing its "Wide Track" design, Pontiac billed itself as the "performance division" of General Motors that marketed cars with the "we build excitement" tag line.

Facing financial problems in the late 2000s, and a need to restructure as a prerequisite for a $53 billion government bailout, GM agreed to discontinue the Pontiac brand. The final Pontiac, a white G6, was assembled on January 4, 2010. Franchise agreements for Pontiac dealers expired on October 31, 2010, leaving GM to focus on its four remaining North American brands: Chevrolet, Buick, Cadillac, and GMC.

== History ==
=== 1926–1942 ===
The first logo of Pontiac was launched in 1926 and featured the eponymous Native American chief.

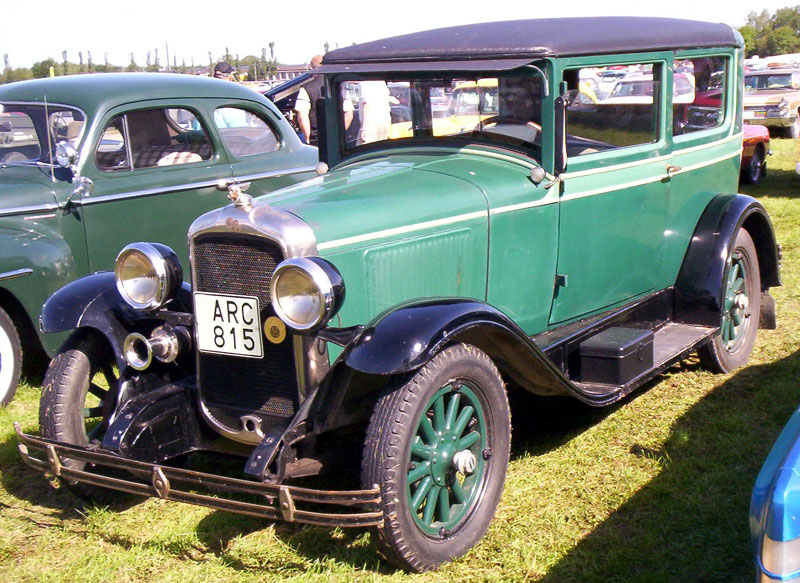
1928 Pontiac Series 6-28 2-door 5-passenger Coach sedan

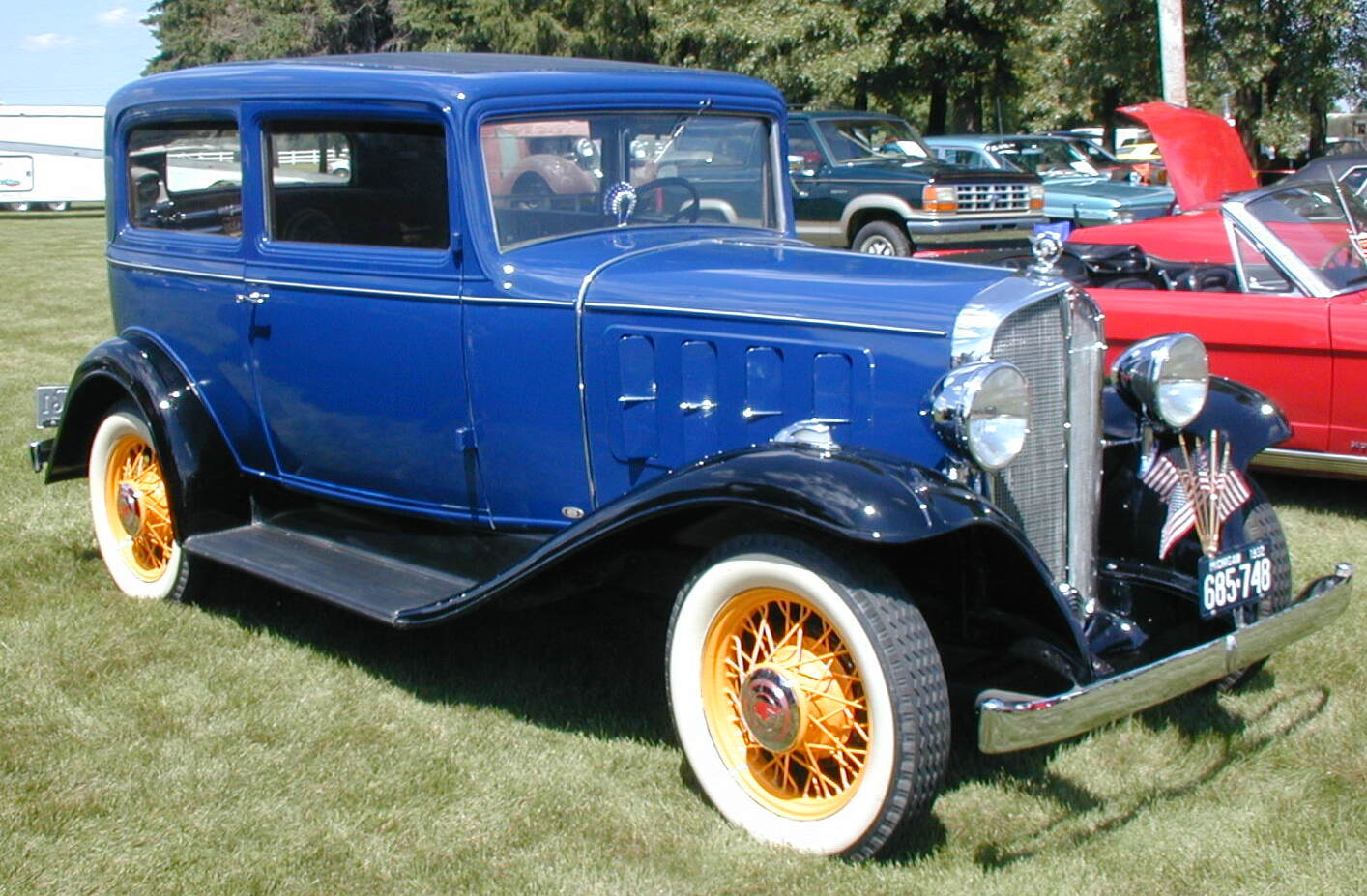
1932 Pontiac Series 402 Six 2-door 5-passenger Coach sedan

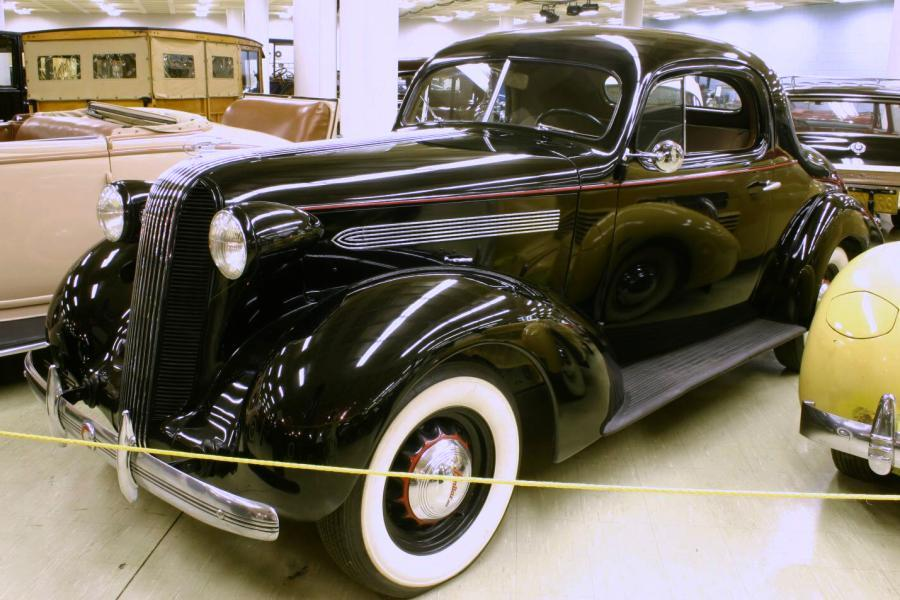
1936 Pontiac Master Six Series 6BB Coupe

The Oakland Motor Car Company was founded in 1907 in Pontiac, Michigan, by Edward Murphy, a manufacturer of horse-drawn carriages. The following year, another former buggy company executive, William C. Durant, founded General Motors in Flint, Michigan, as a holding company for the Buick Motor Company. GM soon bought other automakers, including Oldsmobile and Cadillac. In 1909, Oakland became part of GM. The first model made its debut as the Oakland Four from 1909 until it was replaced by the Oakland Six in 1916. In 1926 the Pontiac Series 6-27 was introduced as a junior brand to Oakland, which featured a six-cylinder engine. Within months of its introduction, Pontiac was outselling Oakland, and became its own GM division when Oakland was canceled in 1931.

It was named after the famous Odawa chief, who had also given his name to the city of Pontiac, Michigan, where the car was produced. Body styles offered included a sedan with both two and four doors, Landau Coupe, with the Sport Phaeton, Sport Landau Sedan, Sport Cabriolet, and Sport Roadster.

Pontiacs were also manufactured from knock-down kits at GM's Japanese factory at Osaka Assembly in Osaka, Japan, from 1927 until 1941.

Pontiac produced cars offering 40 hp (30 kW; 41 PS), 186.7 cu in (3.1 L) (3.25×3.75 in, 82.5×95mm) L-head straight-six cylinder engines in the Pontiac Series 6-27 of 1927; its stroke was the shortest of any American car in the industry at the time. The Series 6-27 sold 39,000 units within six months of its appearance at the 1926 New York Auto Salon, hitting 76,742 in 12 months. The next year, 1928, it became the top-selling six-cylinder car in the U.S., as well as ranking seventh in overall sales. When the Wall Street Crash of 1929 occurred in September, both Pontiac and Oakland sales dropped dramatically and because Oakland was the more expensive, GM leadership decided that Pontiac should remain.

1932 was the first year for the Pontiac Series 302 V8. The 1932 V8 had an oversquare bore and stroke of 3.4375 in (87.3 mm) x 3.375 in (85.7 mm) displacing 251 cu in (4.1 L) with a compression ratio of 5.2:1. Horsepower was rated at 85 hp (63 kW; 86 PS) @3200 RPM using three main bearings, solid valve lifters and a Marvel one-barrel carburetor. Unusually, Pontiac switched to the straight-eight for 1933 until it was replaced in 1954.

As the economy began to recover, by 1933, Pontiac had moved up to producing the least expensive cars available with straight-eight engines. This was achieved by using many components from the six-cylinder Chevrolet Master, such as the body. The Pontiacs were differentiated by a large chrome strip on the top and center of the front hood that Pontiac called the "Silver Streak". Only eight-cylinder engines were offered in 1933 and 1934, displacing 223.4 cu in (3.7 L) rated at 77 hp (57 kW; 78 PS).

In 1935, Pontiac shared the "torpedo" body appearance with the LaSalle and the Cadillac Series 60, just prior to its being used by Chevrolet, earning some media attention for the marque. At the 1939 New York World's Fair, a 1939 Deluxe Six was displayed with body panels made entirely from plexiglass. An unusual feature of the "torpedo"-bodied exhibition car was that, with the push of a button, the front half of the body would open showing the engine and the car's front seat interior.

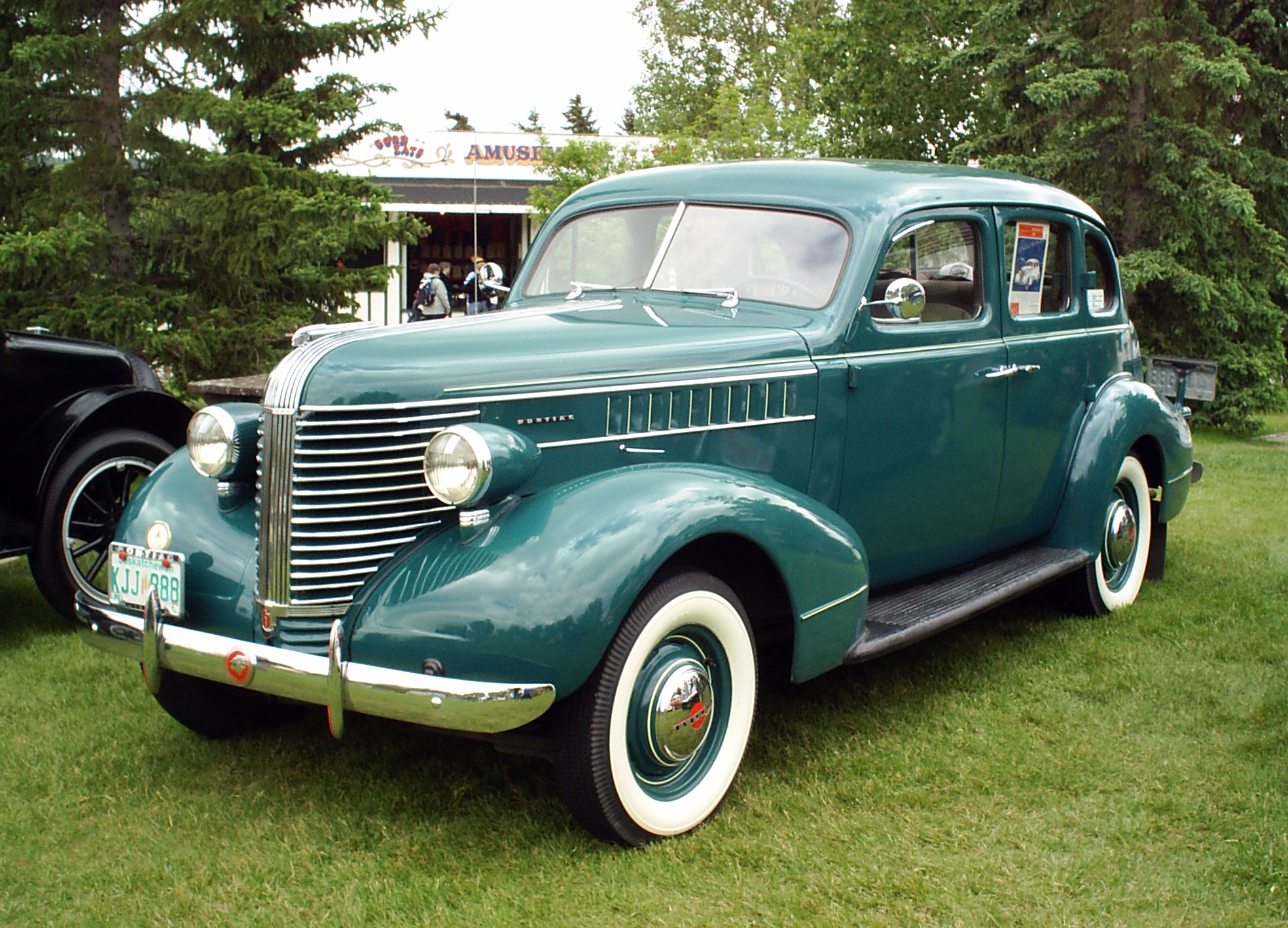
1938 Pontiac Deluxe Six Series 26

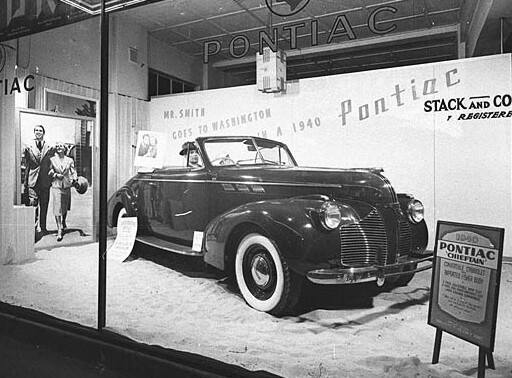
1940 Pontiac Chieftain in showroom, York Street, Sydney.

A major change occurred in 1937, when all Pontiac models except the new station wagon began using the all-steel B-body shared with Oldsmobile, LaSalle, and small Buicks. A new stronger X frame had a Hotchkiss drive using a two-part drive shaft. The eight-cylinder had a 122-inch (3,099 mm) wheelbase, while the six-cylinder had a 117-inch (2,972 mm) wheelbase. Both engines increased displacements with the six going to 222.7 cu in (3.6 L) producing 85 hp (63 kW; 86 PS) and the eight to 248.9 cu in (4.1 L) rated at 100 hp (75 kW; 101 PS).

From 1940 through 1942, the Pontiac Torpedo was the brand's only model built on three different bodies: the "A" body shared with Chevrolet, the "B" body shared with Oldsmobile and Buick, and the "C" body shared with the large Oldsmobile, Buick, and the small Cadillac. It shared some appearances with the Opel Kapitän. In 1941 the Pontiac Streamliner appeared with a straight-8 engine, and on February 2, 1942, the last civilian Pontiac automobile was manufactured in the United States, as all automobile factories converted to military production.

The prewar through the early 1950s Pontiacs were not powerful as they featured the heavy and long Pontiac straight-8 engine, which was less expensive to produce than the increasingly popular V8s. Their long crankshaft suffered from excessive flex, thus limiting them to a low compression ratio with a modest redline.

=== 1946–1954 ===
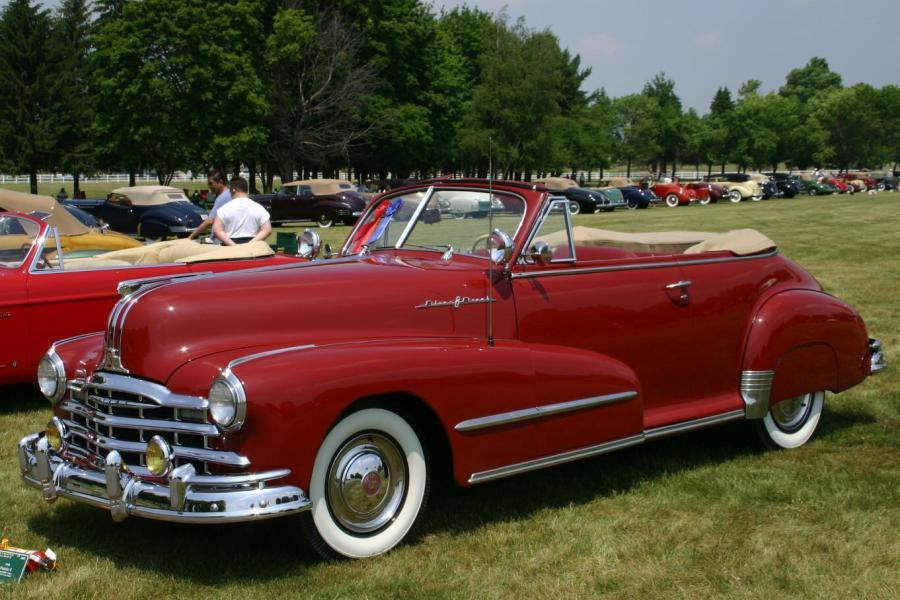
1948 Pontiac Silver Streak Convertible Coupe

From 1946 until 1948, all Pontiac models were essentially 1942 models with minor changes. The Hydramatic automatic transmission was introduced in 1948 and helped Pontiac sales grow even though their cars, Torpedoes, and Streamliners, were becoming out of date.

The first all-new Pontiac models appeared in 1949. They incorporated styling cues such as lower body lines and rear fenders that were integrated into the rear-end styling of the car. The Chieftain line was introduced to replace the Torpedo. Built on the GM B-body platform, the Chieftain featured different styling from the Streamliner. In 1950, the Catalina pillarless hardtop coupe was introduced as a "halo" model, similar to the Chevrolet Bel Air of the same year.

In 1952, Pontiac discontinued the Streamliner and replaced it with additional models in the Chieftain line built on the GM A-body platform. This single model line continued until 1954 when the Star Chief was added. The Star Chief featured a 11-inch (280 mm) stretch to the A-body platform giving it a 124-inch (3,100 mm) wheelbase.

The 1953 models were the first to have one-piece windshields instead of the previous two-piece units. While the 1953 and 1954 models were heavily reworked versions of the 1949-52 Chieftain models, they were engineered for the V8 engine that was supposed to be introduced on the 1953 models, but the Buick division complained to GM's management that the introduction might take sales away because Buick was introducing the new nailhead V8 in 1953.

In 1954, Pontiac continued to build upon the design and engineering of their vehicles, which had seen significant updates in previous years. While the 1953 and 1954 models were reworked versions of the 1949–1952 Chieftain models, the year 1954 brought a unique marketing strategy to the forefront. Pontiac introduced an advertising campaign that featured striking prints depicting the impressive feats of Native American tribes. These prints showcased various aspects of tribal life, from awe-inspiring acts of construction to hunting and other means of survival. The campaign not only highlighted the rich heritage and craftsmanship of Native American cultures but also added an element of cultural resonance to the Pontiac brand, creating a unique and memorable connection with potential customers.

=== 1955–1960 ===
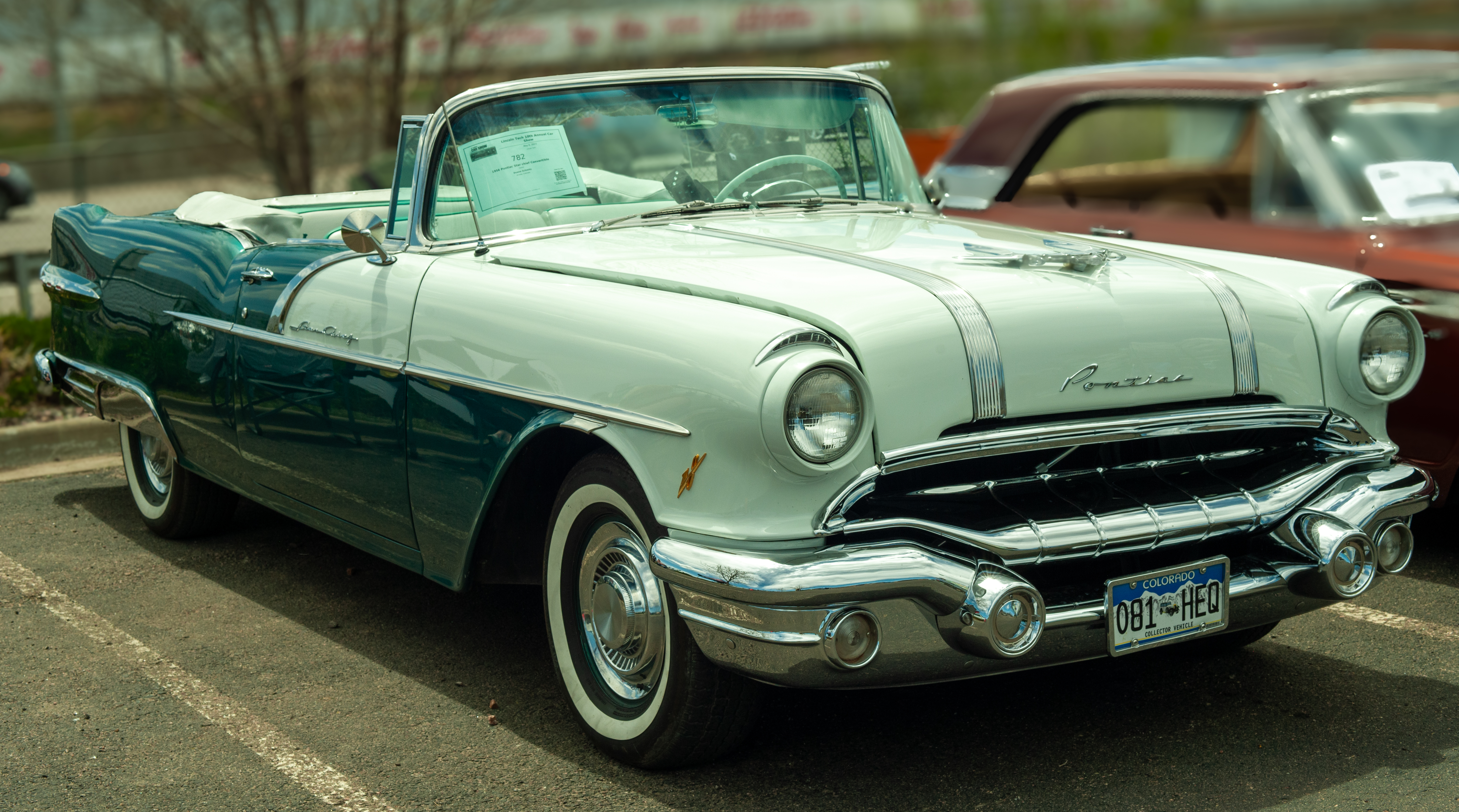
1956 Pontiac Star Chief Convertible in Glendale and Hialeah green two-tone

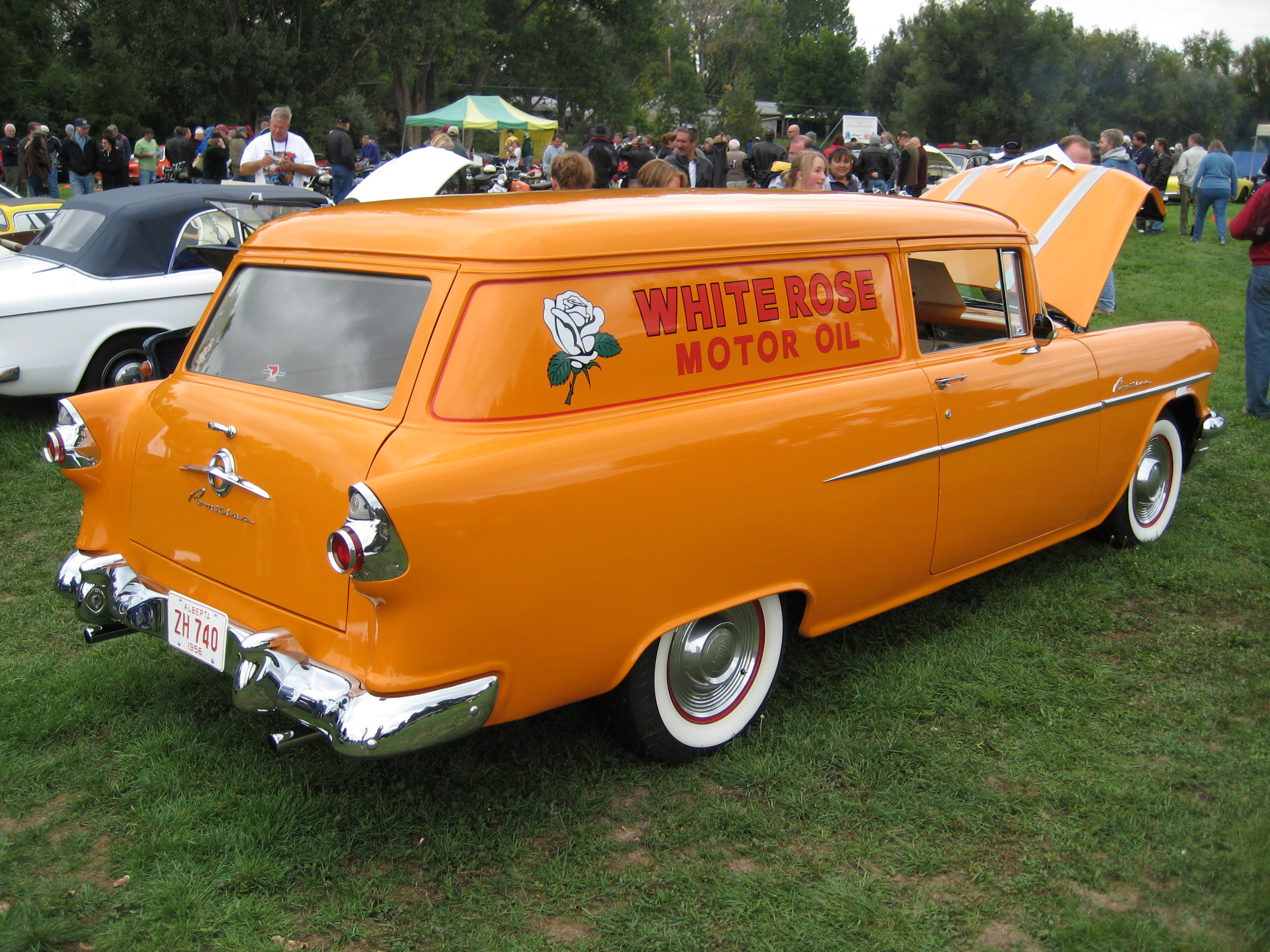
1956 Canadian Pontiac Pathfinder sedan delivery, 1,383 built, not available in the U.S.

Completely new bodies and chassis were introduced for the 1955 model year and sales increased. A new 173 hp (129 kW; 175 PS) overhead-valve Strato Streak V8 engine was introduced. With the introduction of this V8, the six-cylinder engines were discontinued; a six-cylinder would not return to the full-size Pontiac line until the GM corporate downsizing of 1977.

In 1956, when Semon "Bunkie" Knudsen became general manager of Pontiac, alongside new heads of engineering, E. M. Estes and John DeLorean, Knudsen began reworking the brand's image. One of the first steps involved the removal of the "silver streaks" from the hood and deck lid which were a traditional styling feature beginning in 1933. These were eliminated from the 1957 models just weeks before they were introduced. The first Bonneville was also introduced. This was a version of the Star Chief convertible to showcase Pontiac's first fuel-injected engine. About 630 Bonnevilles were built in 1957. As a sporting model, they were built on the short wheelbase Chieftain chassis. Pontiac marketing described all Pontiac's as "America's No. 1 Road Car".

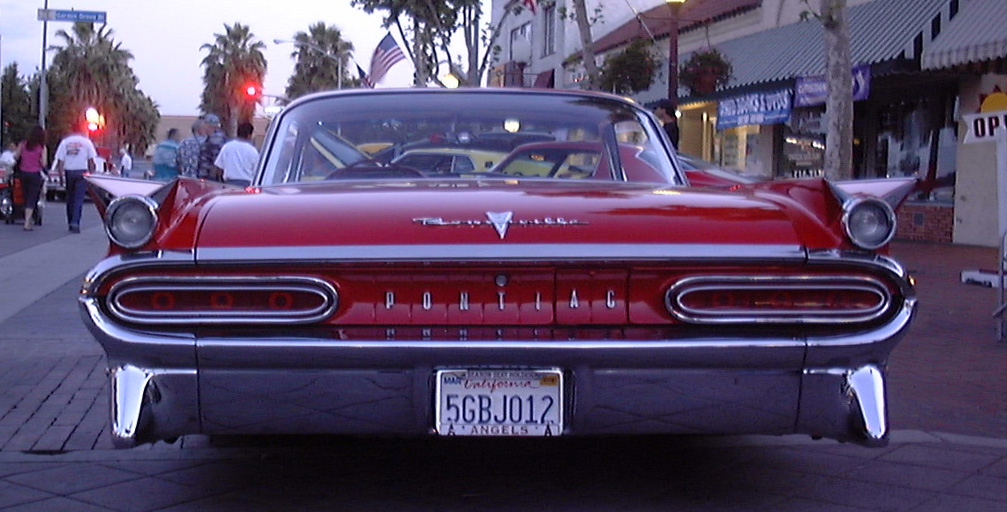
1959 Bonneville from the rear, showing double rear fins

The following year, the Bonneville became its own line, built on the 122-inch (3,100 mm) wheelbase of the B-body platform. A 1958 Tri power Bonneville was the pace car for that year's Indianapolis 500. The 1958 model year was final use of the "Indian" motif throughout the vehicle. The only exception would be the Indian head high-beam indicator light in the instrument cluster. All 1958 models featured ball joint front suspension replacing the previous kingpin design.

With the 1959 model year, Pontiac came out with its "Arrowhead" emblem, with the star design in the middle. The "Arrowhead" design ran all the way up the hood from between the split grille, and on Star Chief models, had eight chrome stars from the emblem design on the body sides as chrome trim. Knudsen directed that the Pontiacs received a completely reworked chassis, body, and interior styling. Quad headlamps, as well as a longer, lower body, were some of the styling changes.

The Chieftain line was renamed Catalina; the Star Chief was downgraded to replace the discontinued Super Chief series and for the first time did not have a two-door hardtop, only a two-door sedan along with a four-door hardtop and four-door sedan; in addition, there was no Star Chief wagon. The Bonneville was now the top of the line, coming in three body styles: a two-door hardtop, a four-door hardtop, and a four-door station wagon. The Star Chief's four-door "Vista" hardtop was also shared by the Bonneville. Catalina models included a two-door hardtop, two-door sedan, four-door sedan, and four-door hardtop as well as two station wagons, a six-passenger with two rows of seats, and a nine-passenger version with a rear-facing third row. Bonneville and Star Chief were built on a 124-inch (3,100 mm) wheelbase with the exception of the Bonneville wagon, and all Catalina models and the Bonneville wagon rode on a 122-inch (3,100 mm) wheelbase. Catalina was also 7 in (178 mm) shorter than Bonneville and Star Chief and weighed 100–200 lb (45–91 kg) less than its long-wheelbase counterparts. All 1959 Pontiacs were equipped with a 389 cu in (6.4 L) V8 engine with horsepower ratings from 215 hp (160 kW; 218 PS) to a 345 hp (257 kW; 350 PS) "Tri-power" carbureted version. All automatics were four-speed Super-Hydra-Matics or, as the Hydramatic Division that designed and built them called them, "Controlled coupling HydraMatic". Oldsmobile used this same transmission and called it Jetaway Hydramatic; Cadillac also used it and called it 315 or P 315 Hydramatic. A three-speed, column-mounted stick shift was standard on all Pontiacs. This coincided with major body styling changes across all models that introduced increased glass area, twin V-shaped fins, and lower hood profiles. Motor Trend magazine selected the Pontiac line as the 1959 Car of the Year. The 1959s featured a 5-inch (127 mm) wider track. The increase to 64-inch (1,626 mm) was because Knudsen noticed the new, wider bodies looked awkward on the carried-over 1958 frames. The new "Wide-Track" Pontiacs improved styling, handled better, and contributed to Pontiac's resurgence in the marketplace.

The 1960 models had a complete reskinning with the exception of the body's canopies, which remained identical to the 1959s, but removed the tail fins and the distinctive split grille. The 1960 models' standard engine had a power gain of 3 hp due to a compression increase of .25. The Ventura was introduced, and a more luxurious hardtop coupe with the four-door hardtop built on the shorter 122-inch (3,100 mm) wheelbase platform, thus positioned between the Catalina and Star Chief models. The Ventura featured the luxury features of the Bonneville in the shorter, lighter Catalina body.

=== 1961–1970 ===
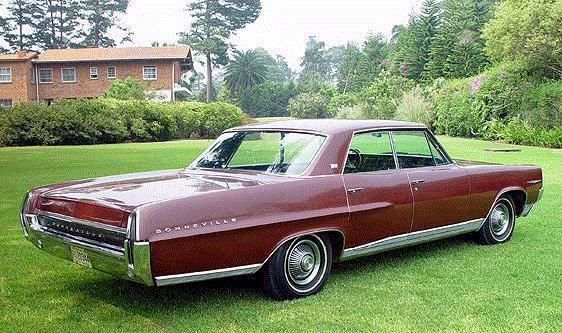
A 1964 Pontiac Bonneville Brougham

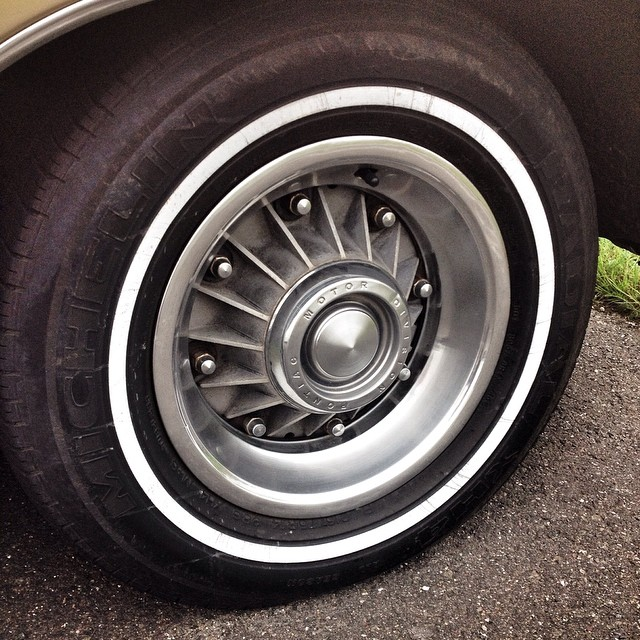
Full-sized Pontiacs from 1960 through 1968 were available with finned, eight-bolt wheels, that helped to cool the drum brakes.

Most of Pontiac's models built during the 1960s and 1970s were either styled like or were siblings with other GM makes (except Cadillac). Pontiac retained its own front- and rear-end styling, interiors, and engines.

The 1961 models were restyled. The split grille returned, as well as all-new bodies and a new design of a perimeter-frame chassis for all its full-size models (something which would be adopted for all of GM's intermediate-sized cars in 1964, and all its full-sized cars in 1965). These new chassis allowed for reduced weight and smaller body sizes. The similarly styled Chevrolet still used the "X" frame from the early 1960s.

A new compact Tempest was introduced for the 1961 model year. It was one of the three Buick-Olds-Pontiac (BOP) models introduced that year, sharing the platform with the Buick Special, Skylark, and Oldsmobile F-85. A four-cylinder engine was also introduced in the Tempest model line.

All three BOP cars were unibody, dubbed the Y-body platform, combining the frame and body into a single construction, making them comparatively lighter and smaller. All three put into production new technology pushed by John DeLorean, on which GM had been working for several years prior, but the Tempest was by far the most radical. A flexible steel shaft rotating at the speed of the engine delivered power from the front-mounted engine through a "torque tube" to a rear-mounted transaxle. This provided close to a 50/50 front-rear weight distribution that improved handling as well as incorporated four-wheel independent suspension. The design almost eliminated the large floor "hump" common to front-engined, rear-drive cars.

Though the Tempest's transaxle was similar to the one in the Corvair, introduced the year before, it shared essentially no common parts. GM had planned to launch a Pontiac version of the Corvair (dubbed "Polaris"), but Bunkie Knudsen—whose niece had been seriously injured in a Corvair crash—successfully argued against the idea. The Polaris design apparently made it to full-scale clay before it was canceled. Instead, DeLorean's "rope-shaft" design was green-lighted.

The Tempest won the Motor Trend "Car of the Year" award in 1961. Toward the end of 1961, an upscale version of the Tempest called the LeMans was introduced.

The Tempest featured a 194.5 cu in (3.2 L) inline slant-four cylinder engine, derived from the right bank of Pontiac's 389 V8, enabling it to be run down the same production line and reducing costs. the engine received a crankshaft designed for four cylinders, but this did not completely solve its balance issues. The engine gained the nickname "Hay Baler" because of its tendency to kick violently, like the farm machine.

An optional Buick 215 cu in (3.5 L) V8, was not popular when it was available for 1961 and 1962 in the Tempest. For 1963, Pontiac replaced it with a new "326" that was actually 336 cu in (5.5 L) V8 with a bore of 3.78 and stroke of 3.75 (same stroke as the 389). It was based and shared parts with the 389, but an altered, reduced bore. The car's body and suspension were also changed to be lower, longer, and wider. The response was that more than half of the 1963 Tempests and LeMans (separate lines for that one year only) were ordered with the V8. The next year, the 326 became a true 326 with a new bore size of 3.72. The Tempest's popularity helped move Pontiac into third place among American car brands in 1962, a position Pontiac would hold through 1970.

In November 1961, Knudsen moved to Chevrolet. Pete Estes now became general manager of Pontiac and DeLorean was promoted to Pontiac chief engineer. Both continued Knudsen's work of making Pontiac a performance-car brand. Pontiac capitalized on the emerging trend toward sportier bucket-seat coupes in 1962 by introducing the Grand Prix, taking the place of the Ventura, which now became a trim option on the Catalina. Although GM officially ended factory support for all racing activities across all of its brands in January 1963, Pontiac continued making larger engines with more power available across all model lines.

For 1963, the Grand Prix received the same styling changes as other full-sized Pontiacs such as vertical headlights and new body lines with a squared-off roofline with a concave rear window, along with less chrome. The concave rear window was replicated on Tempest/LeMans four-door intermediates in 1964 and 1965.

For 1964, the Tempest and LeMans' transaxle design was dropped and the cars were redesigned under GM's new A-body platform - frame cars with a conventional front-engined, rear-wheel drive layout. The most important of these is the GTO. In spite of a GM unwritten edict against engines larger than 330 cu in (5.4 L) in intermediate cars, DeLorean (with support from Jim Wangers from Pontiac's ad agency), came up with the idea to offer the GTO as an option package that included a 389 cu in (6.4 L) engine rated at 325 or 348 hp (242 or 260 kW; 330 or 353 PS).

The entire Pontiac lineup was selected as Motor Trend's Car of the Year for 1965, the third time Pontiac received this recognition. The February 1965 issue of Motor Trend was almost entirely devoted to Pontiac's Car of the Year award and included feature stories on the division's marketing, styling, engineering, and performance efforts along with road tests of several models. The GTO was split from being an option on the Tempest LeMans series to becoming a separate GTO series.

The 1966 model year saw the introduction of a completely new overhead camshaft (OHC) 6-cylinder engine in the Tempest. The 1962 Jeep Tornado engine was the first post-World War II U.S.-designed mass-produced OHC engine while the Pontiac OHC I6 was available in popular-priced domestic cars. In an industry first, plastic grilles were used on several models.

The 1967 model year saw the introduction of the Pontiac Firebird pony car, a variant of the Chevrolet Camaro. Intermediate-sized cars (Tempest, LeMans, GTO) were mildly face-lifted, but all full-size cars and GTO lost their Tri-Power engine option, though they did get a larger 400 cu in (6.6 L) V8 that replaced the previous 389. Full-sized cars got a major facelift with rounder wasp-waisted body lines, a name change for the mid-line series from Star Chief to Executive as well as a one-year-only Grand Prix convertible.

1968 introduced the Endura 'rubber' front bumper on the GTO, the precursor to modern cars' integrated bumpers, and the first of a series of "Ram Air" engines, which featured the induction of cold air to the carburetor for more power. The Tri carburetor deletion came from the 14th floor of GM banning multiple carburetions and was headed by GM president Ed Cole. The Ram Air V option was not popular. Full-sized cars and intermediates reverted from vertical to horizontal headlights while the 2+2 was dropped from the lineup.

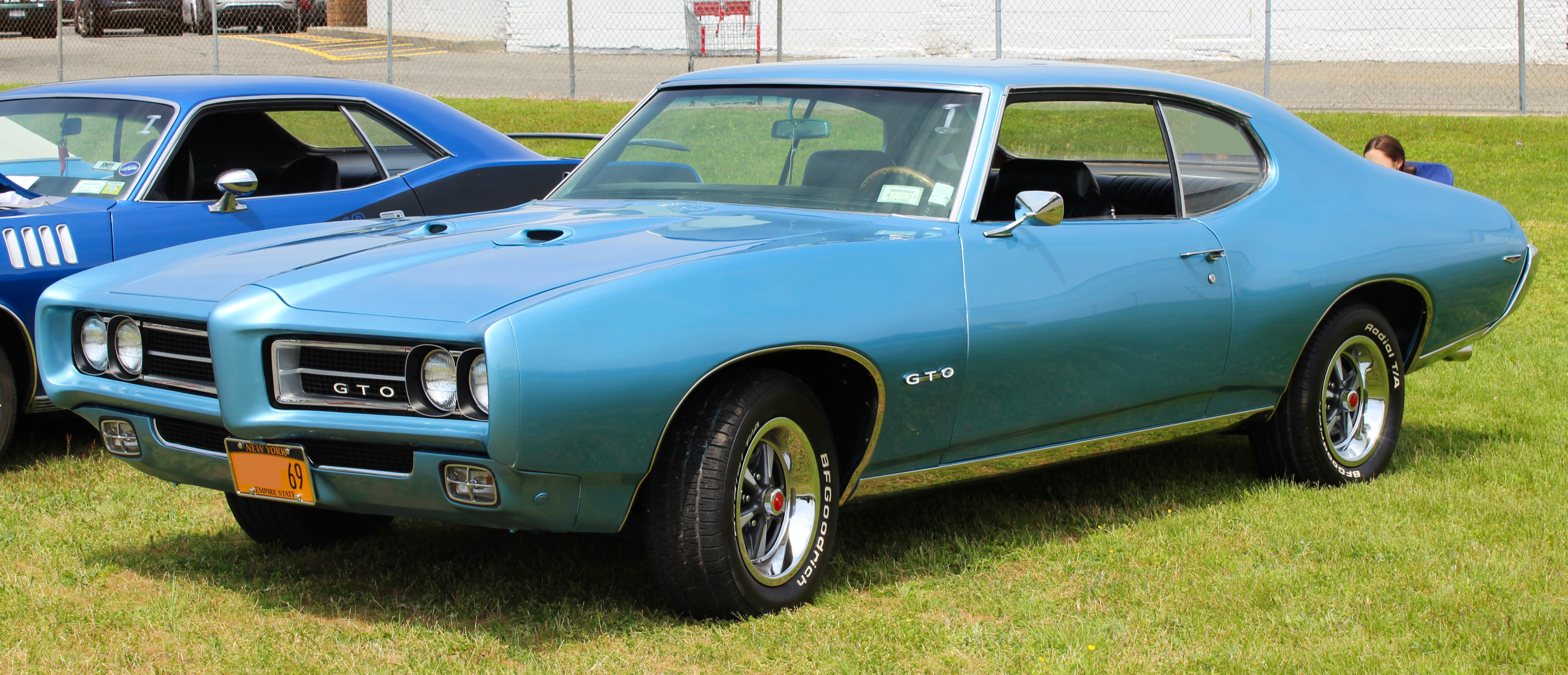
1969 Pontiac GTO

For 1969, Pontiac moved the Grand Prix from the full-sized lineup into a G-body model of its own based on the A-body intermediate four-door modified from 116 in (2,946.4 mm) to 118 in (2,997.2 mm) wheelbase chassis, but with different styling and long hood/short deck proportions to compete in the intermediate-sized personal luxury car segment. Pete Estes, who like Knudsen had moved to be general manager of Chevrolet in 1966, and DeLorean, general manager of the Pontiac division, needed a car to take the place of the sagging sales of the full-size Grand Prix, but the development cost of the car was too much of burden for Pontiac division alone, so Delorean went to his old boss at Chevrolet to gather support for the development cost of the new "G" body Grand Prix. Estes agreed to share in the cost and allow Pontiac to have a one-year exclusivity on this new car; the next year Chevy would follow with its version which was called Chevrolet Monte Carlo. The new Grand Prix was such a sales success in 1969 as dealers moved 112,000 units - more than four times the number of Grand Prixs sold in 1968. Full-sized Pontiacs were also restyled but retained the same basic under-body structure and chassis that debuted with the 1965 model — the roof-lines for the four-door pillared sedans and Safari wagons were the same as the 1965 models, while the two-door semi-fastback design gave way to a squared-off notch-back style and four-door hardtop sedans were also more squared off than 1967 and 1968 models. The GTOs and Firebirds received the Ram Air option, the GTO saw the addition of the "Judge" performance/appearance package, and the Firebird also got the "Trans Am" package. Although originally conceived as a 303 cu in (5.0 L) model to compete in the Trans Am racing series, in a cost-saving move the Pontiac Trans Am debuted with the standard 400 cu in (6.6 L) engines. This year also saw DeLorean leaving the post of general manager to accept a similar position at GM's Chevrolet division. His replacement was F. James McDonald.

Pontiacs built in the late 1960s conformed to new U.S. Federal Motor Vehicle Safety Standards. These included energy-absorbing interior parts such as steering columns, steering wheels, knobs and handles, dual-circuit hydraulic brake systems, shoulder belts, side marker lights, and headrests.

The 1969 Firebirds received a heavy facelift but otherwise continued much the same as the original 1967 model. It was the final year for the overhead cam six-cylinder engine in Firebirds and intermediates, and the Firebird convertible (until 1991). Production of the 1969 Firebirds was extended into the first three months of the 1970 model year (all other 1970 Pontiacs debuted September 18, 1969) due to a decision to delay the introduction of an all-new 1970 Firebird (and Chevrolet Camaro) until February 26, 1970.

In addition in the late-1960s, GM directed their GM and Pontiac divisions to develop concept mini-cars called commuter cars for urban drivers. GM developed a gasoline-electric drive hybrid, the XP-833, and the Pontiac X-4, a rear-wheel drive mid-engine car that was powered by a radical X-shaped aircraft type air-cooled two-stroke radial engine where the standard crankshaft was replaced by a unit called a Scotch yoke. While the GM car was fully tested, the Pontiac concept was not. Neither was placed in production.

=== 1970–1982 ===
Increasing insurance and fuel costs for owners decreased demand for muscle cars, along with federal emissions and safety regulations, put an end to the unrestricted, powerful engines of the 1960s. Safety, luxury, and economy would become the new watchwords of this decade. Engine performance began declining in 1971 when GM mandated that all engines be capable of using lower-octane unleaded gasoline, which led to drops in compression ratios, along with performance and fuel economy. This, coupled with trying to build cars as plush as GM's more luxurious Buicks and Oldsmobiles, contributed to the start of Pontiac's slow decline from its late-1960s highs.

In mid-1971 Pontiac introduced the compact, budget-priced Ventura II (based on the third generation Chevrolet Nova). This same year, Pontiac completely revamped its full-size car lineup. The flagship Bonneville was replaced with the more opulent Grand Ville, while a new generation of full-size Safari station wagons was introduced. These wagons featured a new tailgate known as a 'Clamshell' design; rather than swing upward or outward, the steel portion of the tailgate lowered into the body below the cargo floor and the rear window raised into the roof. The design featured a power-operated glass and either a manual or power-assist tailgate. The power tailgate, the first in station wagon history, ultimately supplanted the manual tailgate, which required marked effort to lift from storage.

The 1972 models saw the first wave of emissions reduction and safety equipment and updates. GTO was a now sub-series of the LeMans. The Tempest was discontinued, after being renamed 'T-37' and 'GT-37' for 1971. The base 1972 mid-sized Pontiac was now called LeMans. James MacDonald left the post of general manager to be replaced by Martin J. Caserio in late 1972. Caserio was the first manager in over a decade to be more focused on marketing and sales than on performance.

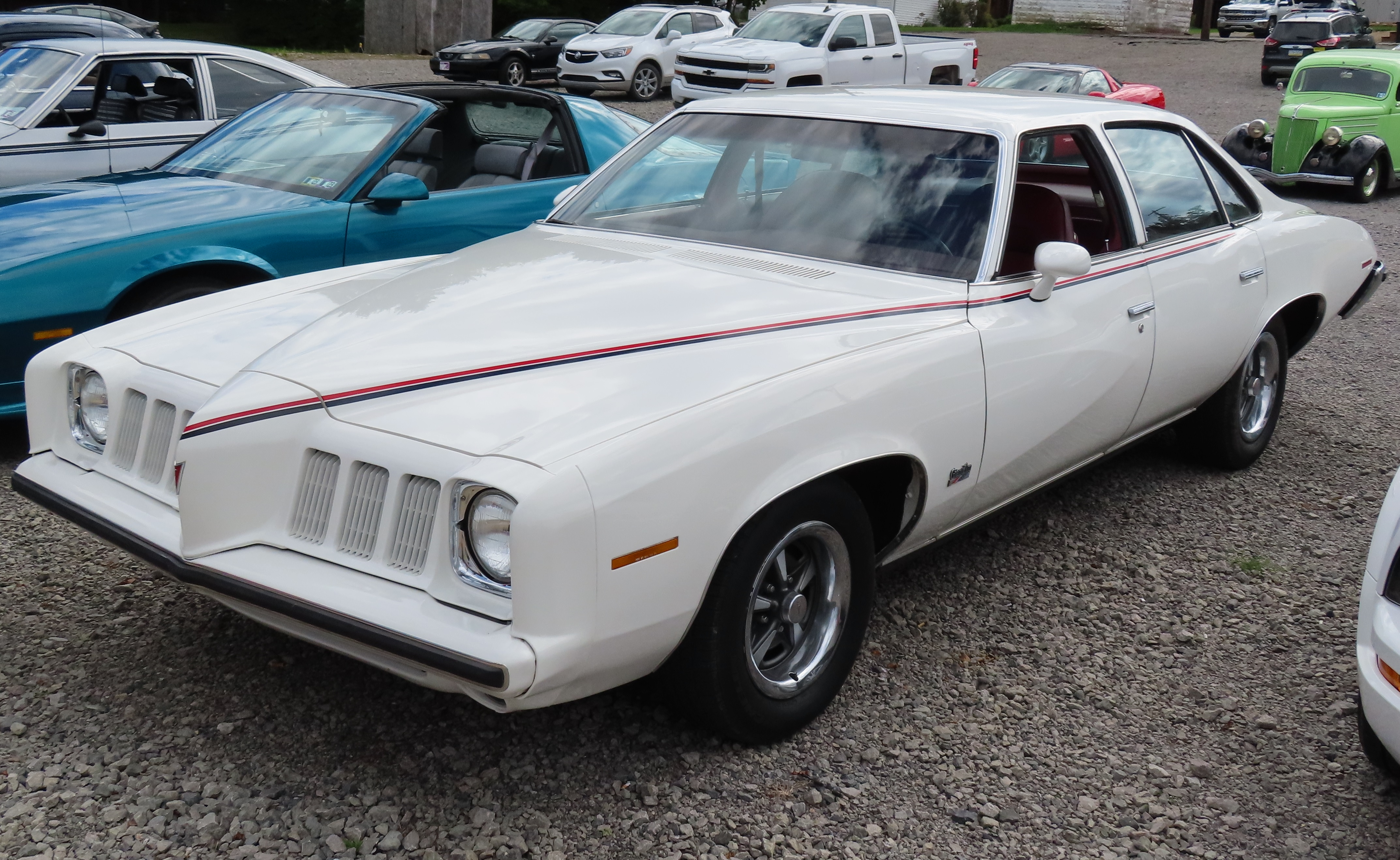
1973 Pontiac Grand Am, the first model year of the Grand Am

For 1973, Pontiac followed suit with the rest of the General Motors divisions and introduced their variants of the all-new GM "A" body, known as the 'Colonnade' style due to the roof treatment's pillared look. "A" body Pontiac models included the mid-sized LeMans and all-new Grand Am as part of the LeMans line. The compact Ventura and personal-luxury Grand Prix were also restyled for 1973. Other models, including the big cars and Firebirds, received only minor updates.

Again, power dropped across all engines as more emissions requirements came into effect. The 1973 Firebird Trans Am's factory-applied hood decal, a John Schinella stylized interpretation of Native American bird designs, took up most of the available space on the hood. Also in 1973, the new Super Duty 455 engine ("Super Duty" harkening back to Pontiac's Racing Engines) was introduced. Although it was originally to be available in GTOs and Firebirds, only a few SD 455 engines made it into Firebird Trans Ams that year. One so equipped was tested by Car and Driver magazine, which proclaimed it the last of the fast cars. The SD 455 was available for one more year in the Trans Am.

As emissions regulations were increasing, two of the three iterations of the 455 cu in (7.5 L) engine were discontinued after 1974, with the final version of the 455 remaining available through 1976.

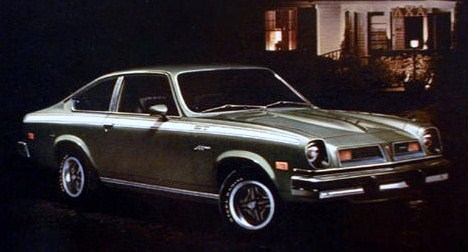
1975 Pontiac Astre

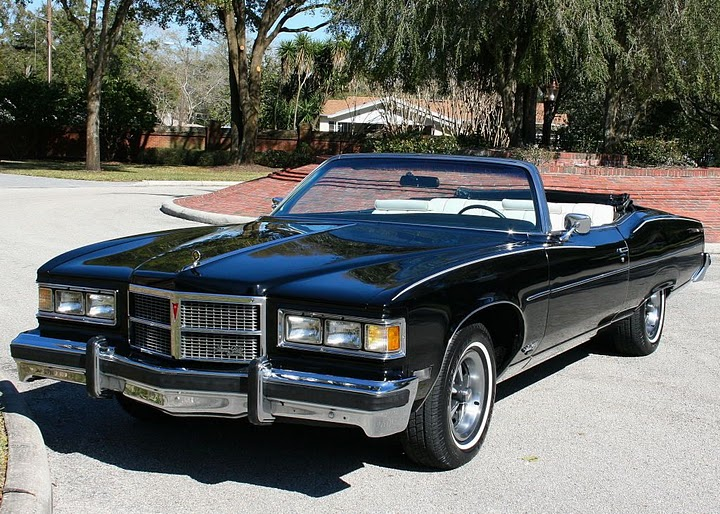
1975 Grand Ville was the last full-size convertible built by Pontiac.

For 1975, Pontiac introduced the new sub-compact Astre, a version of the Chevrolet Vega. This was the brand's entry into the fuel economy segment of the market. Astre had been sold exclusively in Canada since 1973. It was offered through the 1977 model year. 1975 would also be the end of Pontiac convertibles for the next decade.

The 1976 models were the last of the traditional American large cars powered by mostly big-block V8 engines. After this year, all GM full-size models would go through "downsizing" and shrink in length, width, weight, and available engine size. The 1976 Sunbird, based on the Chevrolet Vega and Monza's equivalent, joined the line. It was first offered as a Notchback, with a Hatchback body style added in 1977. The Vega Wagon body style was added in 1978, Sunbird Safari Wagon, replacing the Astre Safari Wagon. The Sunbird was offered in its rear-wheel-drive configuration through the 1980 model year. (Sunbird Safari wagon through 1979.)

For the 1977 model year, the full-sized Pontiacs received the same "downsizing" as GM's other "B" body cars. The Grand Ville was dropped, but the new Bonnevilles and Catalinas continued to be best-sellers, although their styling shared more similarity to the Chevrolet Caprice than ever before.

In mid-year 1977, Pontiac introduced the Phoenix, an upscale version of the Ventura which replaced the Ventura entirely after the end of the 1977 model year. Pontiac also introduced its 151 cu in (2.5 L) "Iron Duke" 4-cylinder overhead valve engine. It was first used in the 1977 Astre, replacing Astre's aluminum-block 140 cu in (2.3 L) Vega engine. The 'Iron Duke' engine would later go into many GM and non-GM automobiles into the early 1990s. The 151 cubic inch I4 and the 301 cu in (4.9 L) V8 were the last two engines designed solely by Pontiac. Subsequent engine design would be accomplished by one central office with all designs being shared by each brand.

The remainder of the 1970s and the early 1980s saw luxury, safety, and economy becoming ever-more important selling points in Pontiac products. Wire-spoked wheel covers returned for the first time since the 1930s. More station wagons than ever were being offered. Padded vinyl roofs were options on almost every model. Rear-wheel drive began its slow demise with the introduction of the first front-wheel drive Pontiac, the 1980 Phoenix (a version of the Chevrolet Citation).

The Firebird was successfully marketed by product placement in the Smokey and the Bandit film and The Rockford Files TV show. The Firebird was available with Formula and Trans Am packages, and a turbocharged V8—a Pontiac first—was also available for the 1980 and 1981 model years.

=== 1982–1988 ===
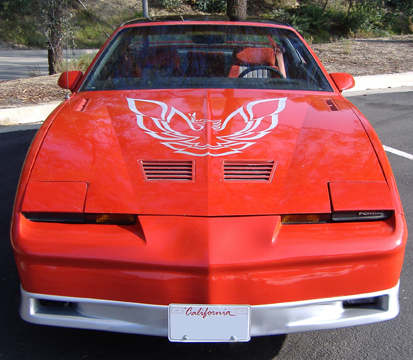
1985 Firebird Trans Am

Introduced in 1982, the wedge-shaped Firebird was introduced, marking the first major redesign of the pony car since 1970. Embedded marketing in the television series Knight Rider was successful. Pontiac introduced more performance-oriented models over the next decade. The Trans Am also set a production aerodynamic mark of .32 cd. A convertible body style was reintroduced after nine years. GM adapted the J-body cars and the all-new 1982 J2000 (later renamed Sunbird) had a convertible as part of its line.

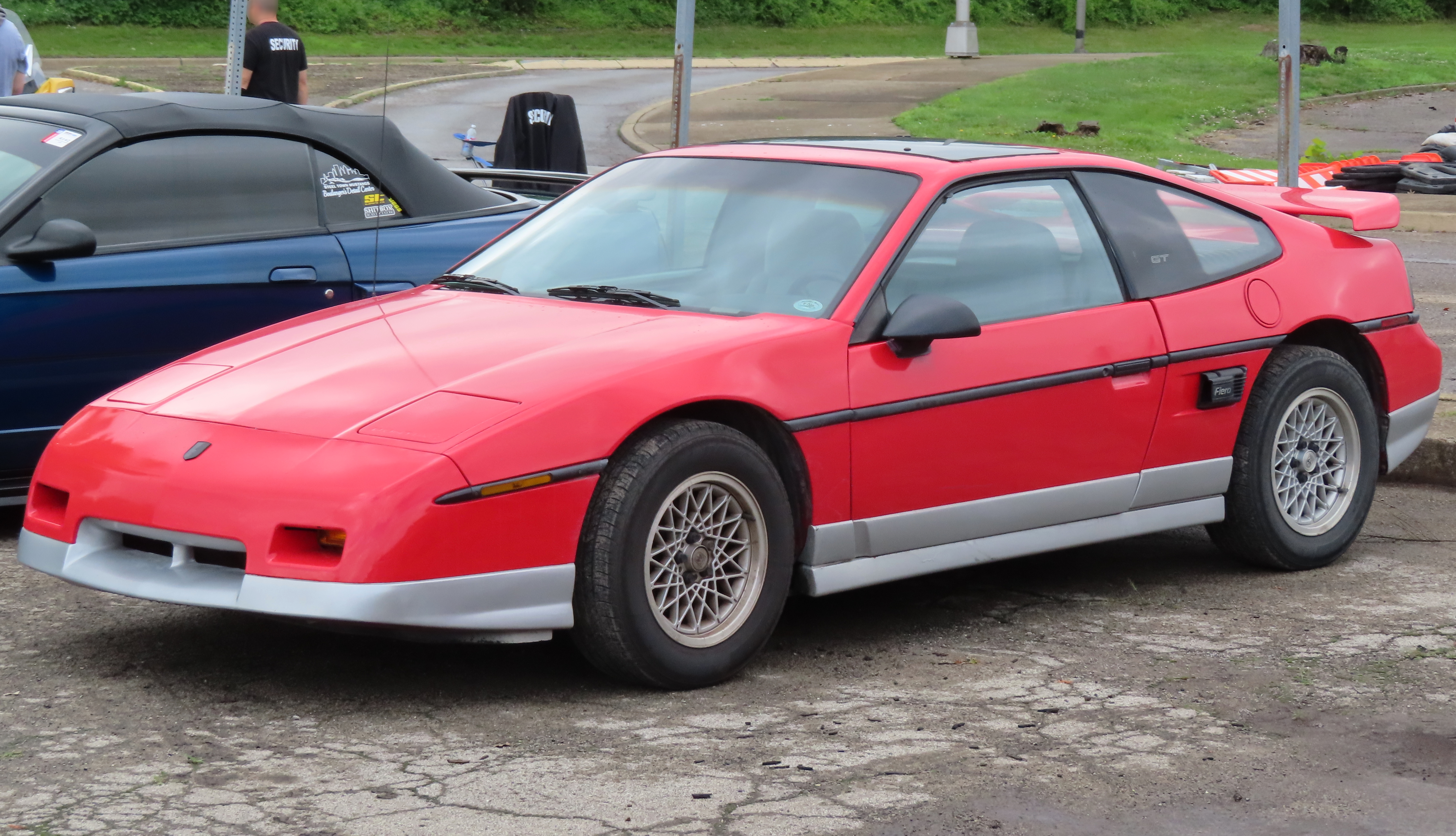
1987 Fiero GT

The 1984 Fiero was a major departure from anything Pontiac had produced in the past. A two-seat, mid-engined coupe. The Fiero was partially responsible for Pontiac seeing its first increase in sales in four years. Pontiac also began to focus on technology. In 1984, a Special Touring Edition (STE) was added to the 6000 line as a competitor to European road cars such as the Mercedes 190. The STE sported digital instruments and other electronics as well as a more powerful V6 and retuned suspension. Later iterations would see some of the first introductions on Pontiacs of anti-lock brakes, steering wheel-mounted radio controls, and other features.

Pontiac imported the Canadian market Pontiac Parisienne, which featured the Bonneville's deluxe trim. This car, although a Pontiac in name, was no more than a slightly re-trimmed Caprice. The Parisienne sold in profitable numbers and this car continued in production until 1986 for the sedan, and 1989 for the Safari station wagon.

With the exception of the Parisienne Safari, the Firebird, and Fiero, beginning in 1988 all Pontiacs, with the exception of the Firebird, switched to front-wheel drive platforms. For the first time since 1970, Pontiac was the number three domestic car maker in America. The median age of Pontiac owners dropped from 46 in 1981 to 38 in 1988.

=== 1989–1997 ===
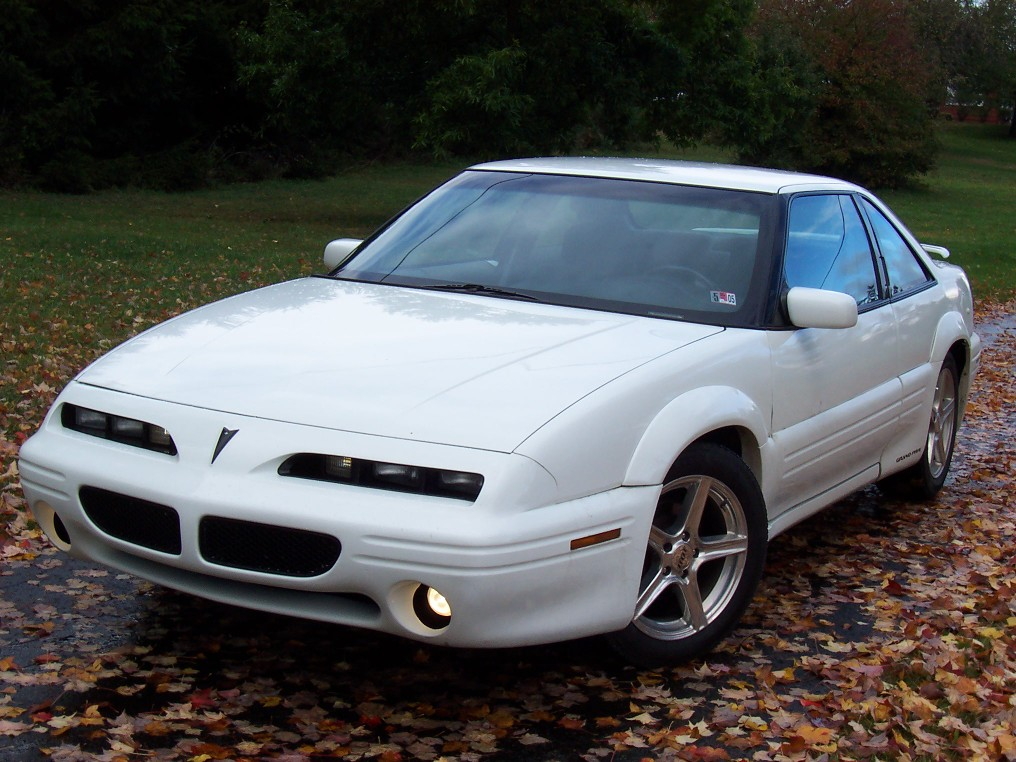
A mid-1990s Grand Prix

Pontiacs introduction included anti-lock brakes, GM's Quad-4 engine, airbags, and composite materials. Safari station wagon production ended in 1989, the last V8-powered full-sized, rear-wheel drive Pontiac until the 2009 G8. The 1990 model year saw the launch of Pontiac's first minivan and light truck, the Trans Sport. In addition, the Grand Prix line added its first-ever 4-door model, offered in LE and STE trims. At the end of the 1991 model year, the 6000 was discontinued in favor of the newly expanded Grand Prix lineup and the new Trans Sport minivan, which replaced the 6000 station wagon.

In 1992, a brand-new Bonneville was introduced. This full-size model featured aerodynamic styling, large expanses of curved glass, front-wheel drive, and the 3800 Series I V6 as standard equipment. A new sub-model, the SSEi, was introduced in 1992 carrying all standard equipment from the SSE model, plus the 205 hp supercharged 3800 V6. For 1993, the Bonneville added a new option package (H4U) called the Sport Luxury Edition (SLE), which was available on the SE model. This package included leather bucket seats, a specific grille, side trim, exhaust, dash trim, lace-styled alloy wheels, as well as a rear spoiler, sport handling suspension systems, and anti-lock brakes.

An all-new Firebird was introduced in 1993. It was powered by either a 3.4 L V6 with 160 hp (119 kW; 162 PS), or in Trans Am guise a 275 hp (205 kW; 279 PS) LT-1, a 350 cu in (5.7 L) V8, and could be backed by a T-56 six-speed manual. The Sunbird was replaced with the (still J-body) Sunfire in 1995. While a V6 engine was no longer available in the J-car, sedan, coupe, and convertible body styles did survive. For 1996 the Bonneville received updated front and rear fascias along with several other enhancements. The 3800 Series II V6 had become standard in 1995, featuring 205 hp. The updated supercharged 3800 Series II was now rated at 240 hp (179 kW; 243 PS) 240 hp.

Division Sales Figures

| Year | Sales |
|---|---|
| 1989 | 801,600 |
| 1990 | 636,390 |
| 1991 | 518,598 |
| 1992 | 519,925 |
| 1993 | 533,776 |
| 1994 | 577,022 |
| 1995 | 589,192 |
| 1996 | 479,973 |
| 1997 | 563,897 |

=== 1997–2004 ===
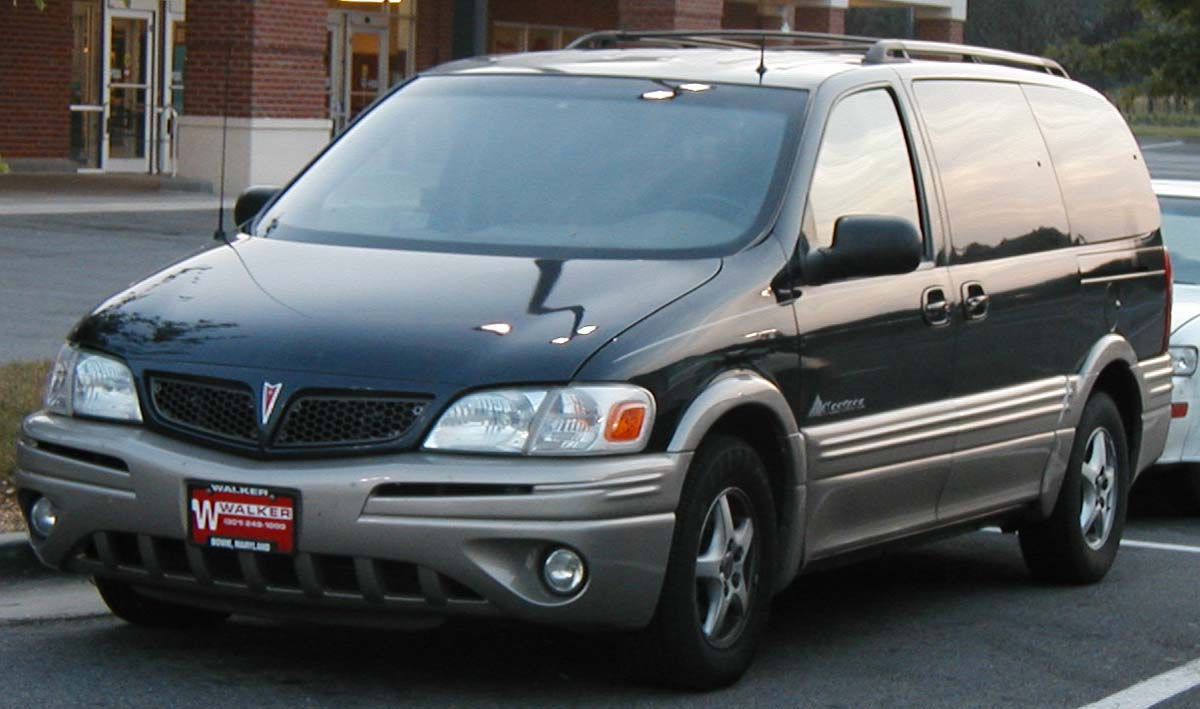
An early-2000s Montana minivan

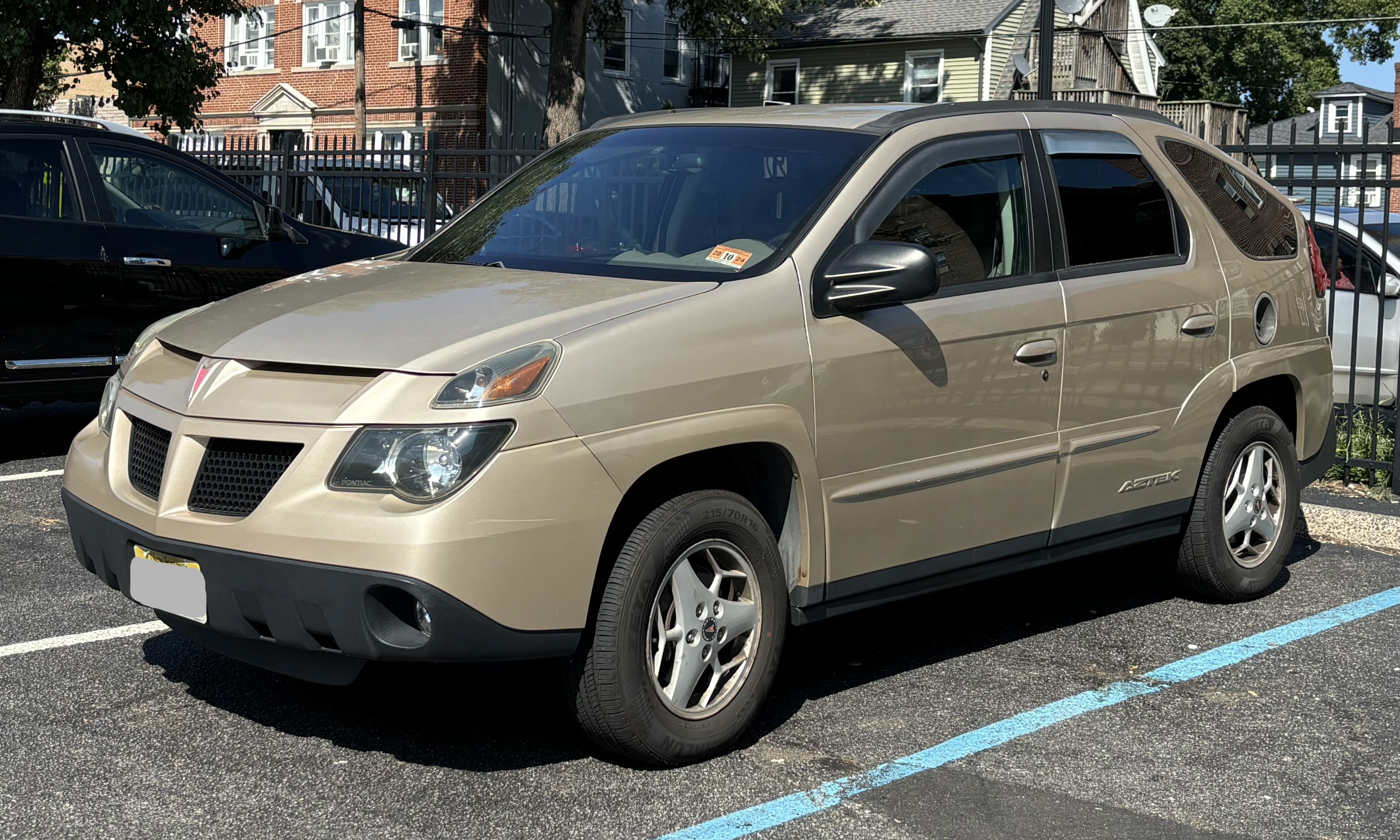
2003 Aztek

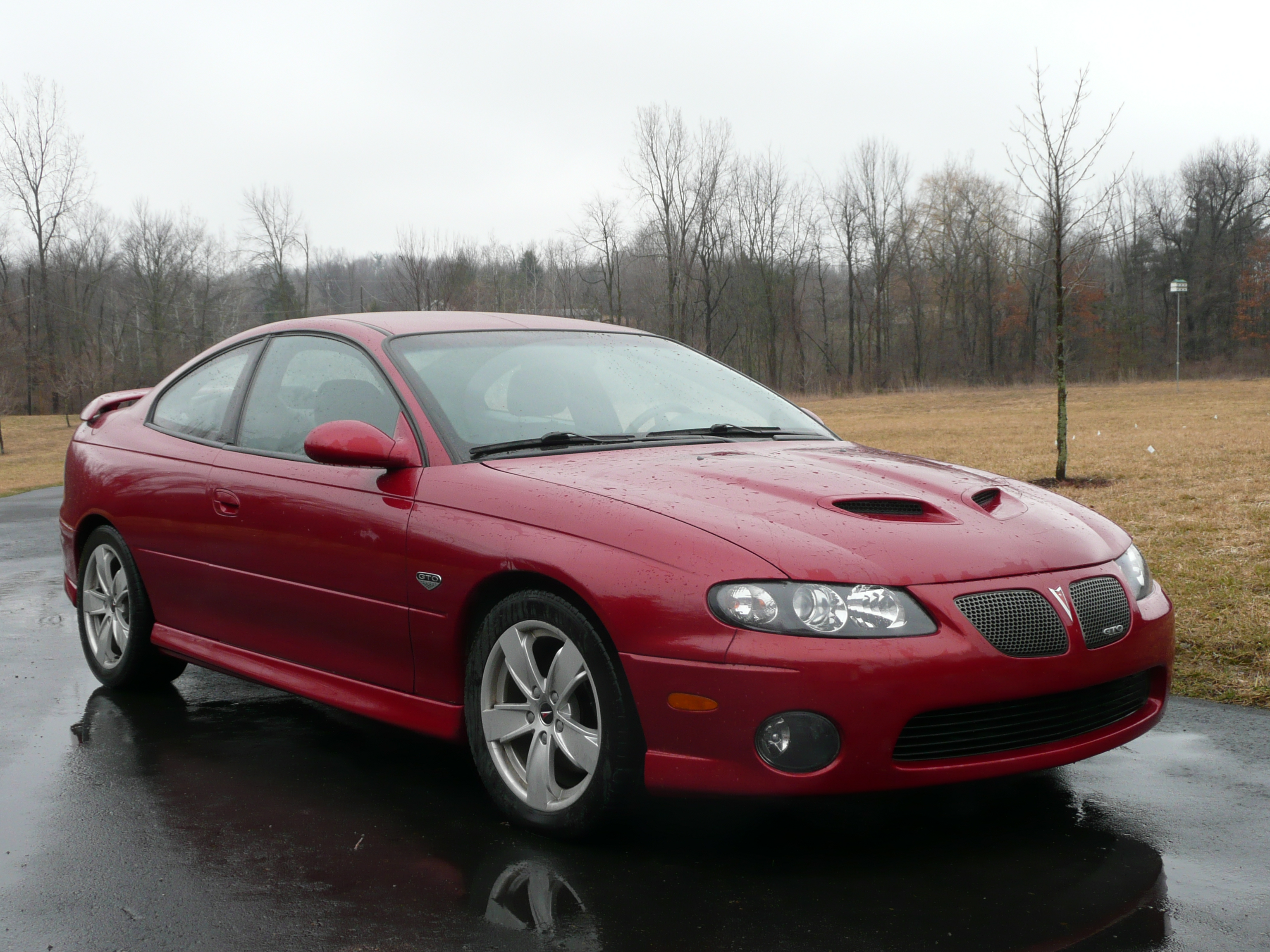
2006 GTO (LS2 V8 version)

The 1996 model year was the last year for the fifth-generation Grand Prix. The Grand Prix debuted in 1997 with the "Wider is Better" advertising campaign. The GTP trim level was added to the Grand Prix. It featured a supercharged 3.8 L V6 rated at 240 hp (179 kW; 243 PS) and 280 lb⋅ft (380 N⋅m) of torque. One design highlight of this generation Grand Prix is the sharing of the roof's sheet metal between both coupe and sedan models.

In 1998 the Firebird was updated. The TransAm received the LS-1 engine which produced 305 hp (227 kW; 309 PS). The WS6 option saw this number increase to 320 hp (239 kW; 324 PS) and the addition of Ram Air and stiffer springs. The 1999 model year saw the replacement of the Trans Sport with the larger Montana minivan.

In 2000, the Bonneville received the first major redesign since 1992 and was based on the G-Body, shared with the Oldsmobile Aurora and Buick LeSabre. In 2001 Pontiac introduced the Aztek into the emerging SUV market segment.

In 2002, both the Firebird/Trans Am and Camaro were discontinued as a result of declining sales and a saturated sports market. The coupe version of the Grand Prix was also discontinued. The 2003 Vibe arrived in spring 2002, a Toyota-based compact wagon built at the NUMMI joint-venture plant. Also, in 2003, it was announced that the Grand Prix would be in the last year of its generation, with an improved seventh generation on the way for 2004. It would also be Pontiac's final year in NASCAR. Pontiac's final victory in the NASCAR Cup Series would be achieved by Ricky Craven in one of the closest finishes in NASCAR history, with David Green scoring their last second-tier series win at the Mr. Goodcents 300 at Kansas Speedway. A few surplus Pontiacs continued running in the Busch Series through 2005, in the ARCA Racing Series through 2007, with factory support in the NASCAR Canadian Tire Series from 2007 to 2009, and in the NASCAR Whelen Modified Tour as late as 2016, six years after the marque went defunct; Pontiac cars can still be found in local and regional stock car leagues.

The 2004 model year saw the reintroduction of the Pontiac GTO (based on the Australian-developed Holden Monaro). The GTO was also initially powered by the 350 hp (261 kW; 355 PS) LS-1 V8 in its first model year. It had an independent front and rear suspension and an upscale full leather interior. Sales did not reach the 18,000 units that GM predicted. The LS1 engine was dropped in 2004. Pontiac added the drive-by-wire 400 hp (298 kW; 406 PS) LS2 V8 for the 2005 and 2006 model years at no additional cost. Additional upgrades also consisted of stainless steel dual exhaust outlets, larger Corvette-sourced PBR brakes with EBD, larger front vented rotors with vented rear rotors, and functional heat extractor hood scoops. The Bonneville introduced the GXP trim level to replace the SSEi. The Bonneville GXP featured a 4.6 Northstar V8, borrowed from Cadillac, and replaced the Supercharged 3800 Series II. The redesigned Grand Prix made its appearance and featured a GT and GTP trim level. The GTP's new 3.8 L supercharged V6 now made 260 hp (194 kW; 264 PS), up 20 from the previous generation. TAPshift was also introduced as well as a Competition Group package (Comp G).

=== 2005–2010 ===
While Oldsmobile was discontinued in 2004, Pontiac underwent a complete product revamping. The Grand Am was replaced with the mid-size G6 in 2005. The Grand Am was produced for the 2005 model year to fill the gap until the new G6 coupe and convertible became available for that model year. Production of the Bonneville officially ended in 2005 after nearly fifty years of production. Although not directly replaced, the RWD G8 introduced for the 2008 model year filled some market segments. The Solstice concept shown in 2002 was approved for production as a roadster (2006–2009), and, for a few months, 1,266 coupes (2009) were built in Wilmington, Delaware, before the end of Pontiac. In contrast, over 64,000 Solstice Convertibles were manufactured on that same line. The controversial Aztek was phased out and replaced by the Torrent, which was identical to the Chevrolet Equinox.

In 2005, the Sunfire was discontinued and replaced by the new Pontiac Pursuit (later named G5 for the American market). Initially, Pontiac did not plan on offering the G5 in the United States; however, dealer pressure to fill the gap left by the discontinuation of the Sunfire caused Pontiac to introduce only the coupe variation into the U.S. The four-door sedan version was available in Canada as the Pursuit throughout the model run. The high-performance GXP trim was introduced in the Grand Prix line in 2005, adding GM's LS4 V8 rated at 303 hp (226 kW; 307 PS) and 323 lb⋅ft (438 N⋅m) of torque. This engine was built to give buyers a V8 sedan option until the all-new G8 arrived in 2008. In 2008, the Grand Prix ended production, and the launch of the Australian-built RWD G8 commenced. The G8 gained positive reception for its high performance and low costs. Many noted the G8 as the poor man's BMW M5 due to its similar performance at a much lower price. The G8 GXP was the most powerful production car Pontiac had ever built and is regarded as the best driver's car ever to wear the Pontiac badge. The Holden Ute was scheduled to launch as the G8 ST before being canceled in January 2009 due to GM's financial situation. It was later announced that the G8 may not see a second generation. Towards the end of the decade, many rumors began spreading that Pontiac would become reliant on RWD. Reports ranged from a compact sedan based on the Alpha platform to a new RWD G6 for the 2013 model year. Many reports suggested that the Trans Am/Firebird would return after GM confirmed the rebirth of the Camaro. However, no official company statements confirmed these.

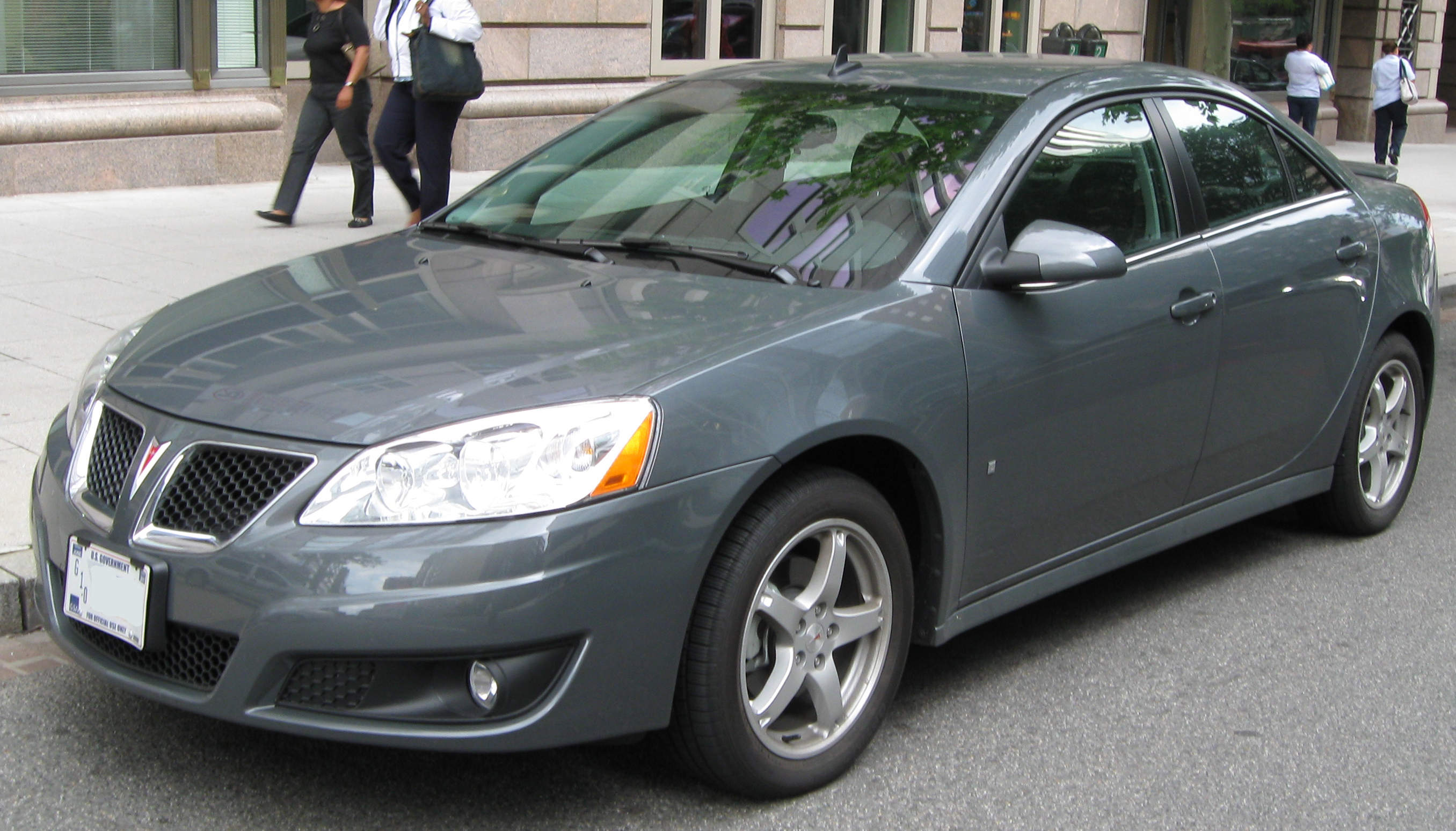
The G6 was the last Pontiac manufactured by General Motors (2009.5 model shown).

On December 2, 2008, General Motors proposed the elimination of numerous brands, including Pontiac, to appease Congress with the objective of receiving a $25 billion loan from the government. On February 17, 2009, GM proposed the sale or elimination of its Saturn division, the sale of Saab, and either the sale or elimination of Hummer, depending on whether a buyer could be found quickly. GM clarified that Pontiac would have begun to focus on "niche" models aimed at the "youthful and sporty" segment, but did not provide specifics. Pontiac was to trim its number of models to four. However, there were discussions of retaining only one model. By April 2009, several automotive websites and business publications were reporting that GM was doing a study suggesting it might eliminate the brand, along with sister truck brand GMC. On April 23, a report from an insider was published stating the company would be dissolving the Pontiac brand while preserving the GMC truck line, and the Chevrolet, Cadillac, and Buick brands. The decision to dissolve Pontiac was made primarily due to the increasing threat of a bankruptcy filing if the June 1 deadline could not be met. The company dropped the Pontiac automobile and phased out all of its remaining models in 2010. Though both production and franchise agreements ended in 2010, Pontiac remains a registered and active trademark of GM for licensing purposes.

General Motors would eliminate an additional 7,000 to 8,000 factory jobs in the United States and shed 2,600 dealers by 2010 under a revised business plan. GM Chief Executive Officer Fritz Henderson said the Pontiac brand would be closed by 2010, calling it an "extremely personal decision". In addition to speeding up decisions on Saturn, Saab, and Hummer, GM would be left with four brands—Chevrolet, Buick, GMC, and Cadillac.

In early May 2009, Jim Waldron, a Davison, Michigan, Pontiac dealer, announced his interest in purchasing the Pontiac brand and logos. He had found financing to buy them along with some soon-to-be shuttered GM plants to build cars. However, GM had already decided to retire the brand as it has begun to sell off its remaining inventory and said that, unlike Saturn, Hummer, and Saab, Pontiac was not for sale.

The Pontiac brand was pulled after the 2009 model year in Mexico and the brand was renamed Matiz, selling only one vehicle, the Matiz G2 (Matiz's logo is similar to Pontiac's).

The last Pontiac, a 2010 model year G6 four-door sedan powered by the 3.5L LZ4 V6 engine and painted in Summit White, was built at the Orion Township Assembly Line and shipped on January 4, 2010 with vehicle identification number 1G2ZA5EK7A4166963. It was acquired by the Pontiac Transportation Museum based in Pontiac, Michigan on March 17, 2023, and now resides there.

Pontiac was one of three brands GM discontinued in 2010; the other two were Hummer and Saturn.

== Leadership ==
- Alfred R. Glancy (1926–1933)
- Harry J. Klingler (1933–1950)
- Arnold Lenz (1950–1956)
- Semon "Bunkie" Knudsen (1956–1961)
- Elliott M. "Pete" Estes (1961–1965)
- John Z. DeLorean (1965–1969)
- James W. McDonald (1969–1972)
- Martin J. Caserio (1973–1975)
- Alex C. Mair (1975–1978)
- Robert C. Stempel (1978–1980)
- William E. "Bill" Hoglund (1981–1984)
- John Middlebrook (1984–1996)
- Roy S. Roberts (1996–1998)
- Lynn Myers (1999–2003)
- Kurt Ritter (2003–2004)
- Jim Bunnell (2004–2006)
- Susan Docherty (2006–2009)

== Style trademarks and logo ==
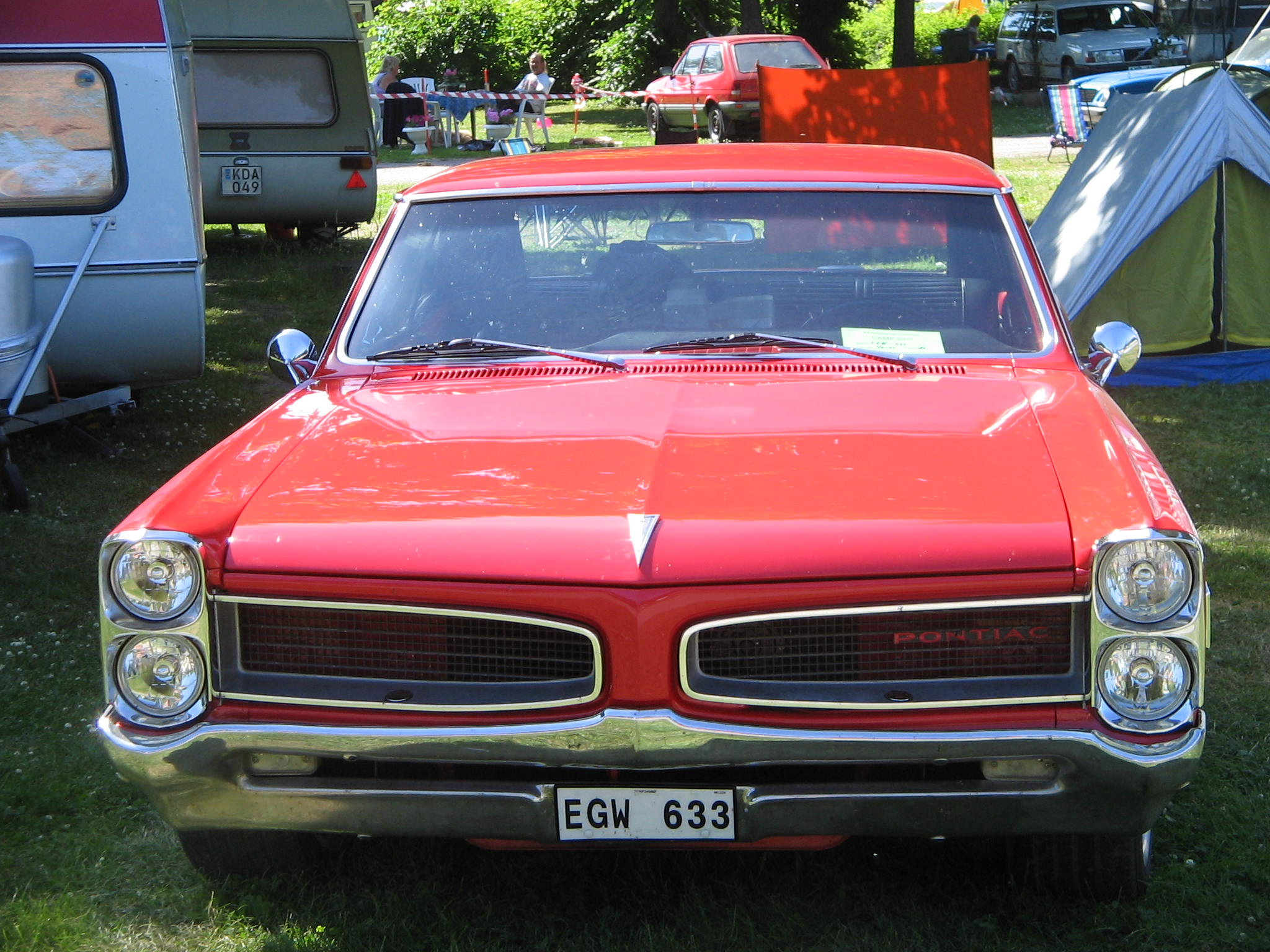
Split grille and arrowhead logo in a 1966 Pontiac GTO

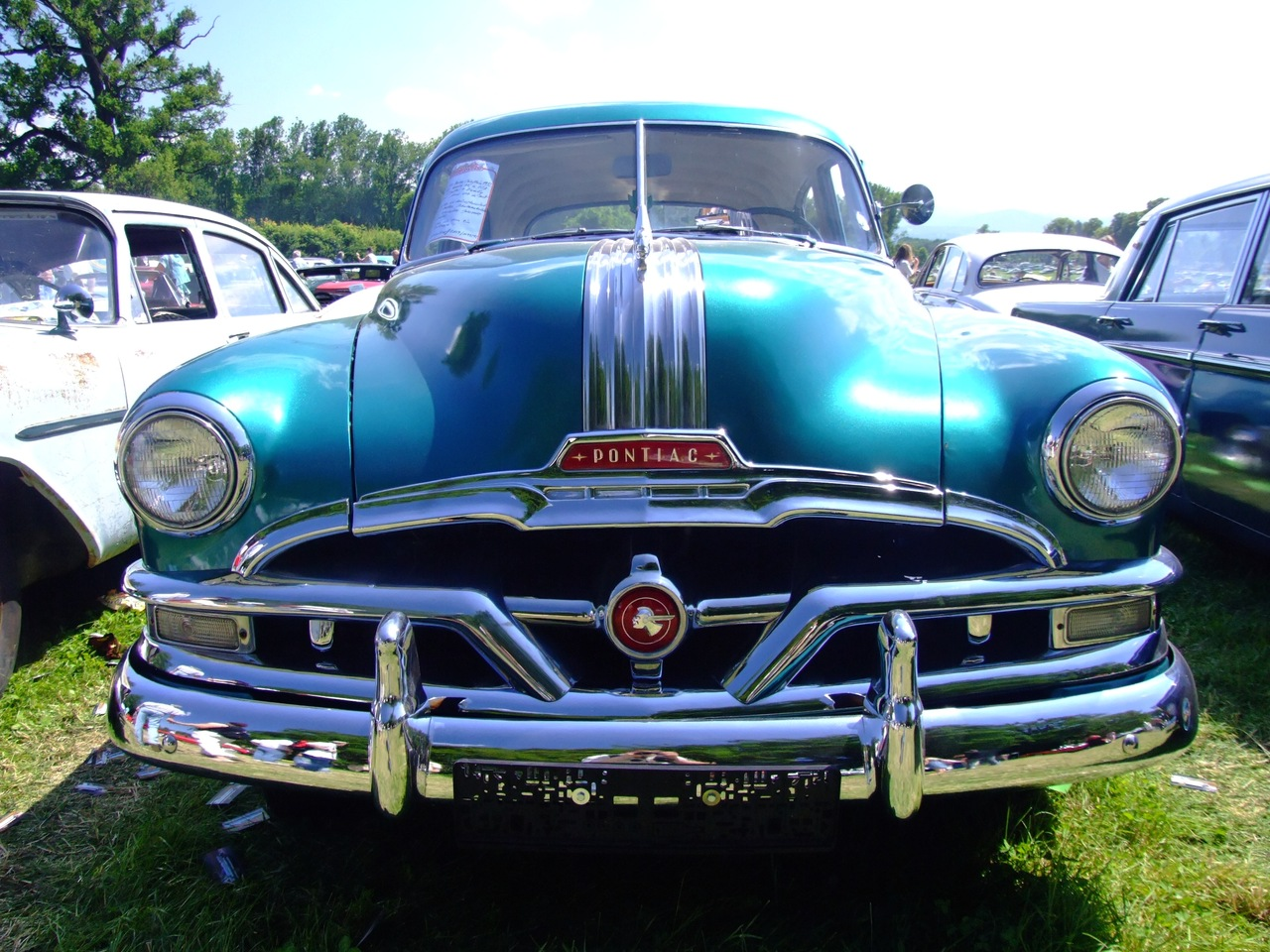
American Indian headdress and silver streak in a 1952 Pontiac Chieftain

A Native American headdress was used as a logo until 1956. This was updated to the Native American red arrowhead design for 1957 for the remainder of the brand's run in all usage except the high-beam indicator lamp, which retained the original logo through 1970. The arrowhead logo is also known as the Dart.

Besides the logo, another identifying feature of Pontiacs was their "Silver Streaks"—one or more narrow strips of stainless steel which extended from the grille down the center of the hood. Eventually, they extended from the rear window to the rear bumper as well, and finally; along the tops of the fins. Although initially a single band, this stylistic trademark doubled to two for 1955 and 1956. The Streaks were discontinued the same year as the Indian Head emblems (1957).

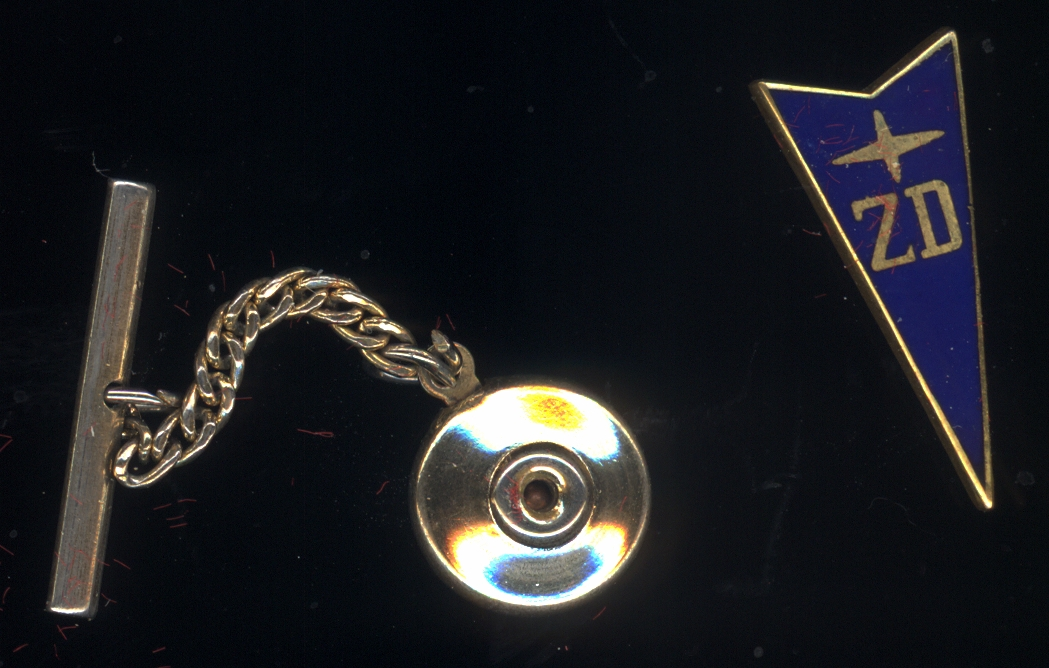
Pontiac Motors Division, Zero Defects tie tack (mid-1960s)

One long-familiar styling element was the split-grille design which was introduced in 1959 to complement the make's new "wide track" stance. The 1960 models, however, reverted to the full-width grille styling. The split grille then returned for the 1961 model year and would remain as the marque's trademark. Other styling cues were the pointed "arrowhead" nose (in the 1960s and 1970s), and "grilled-over" (in the 1960s), or multiple horizontal-striped taillights. This later feature originated with the 1963 Grand Prix, and although the 1962 Grand Prix also had rear grillework, the taillight lenses were not behind it. Less longstanding but equally memorable is the "cladding" common on the doors and fenders of Pontiacs produced in the 1990s and 2000s. Rather than minimizing the side bumper, Pontiac designers put two troughs going along the length. Bumpers with this appearance were found on nearly all Pontiacs until the arrival of the G6. From 2004 onwards, new Pontiacs had cleaner, more premium styling, but retained the traditional split grille.

=== Name controversy ===
The name "Pontiac" had come from the Odawa leader who had fought against the British for Fort Detroit in the 18th century. As mentioned above, GM would incorporate Native American imagery into Pontiac and would use Native American names for its cars on the brand. However, there was never controversy during the brand's lifespan.

Although GM had already discontinued the Pontiac brand, the fact that GM had used the name gained some controversy in 2021 when the Cherokee Nation asked Jeep to rename its popular Jeep Cherokee and Grand Cherokee vehicles. In its statement, the Cherokee Nation cited GM's use of Pontiac as well as the RV manufacturer Winnebago Industries as other examples of Native American names being used on vehicles.

== Canadian/export models ==
Pontiacs were built in Canada by Canadians in GM Canada with Canadian raw materials beginning in 1926, with factories in Oshawa, Ontario, and Regina, Saskatchewan. The models they produced were largely the same as their American counterparts. Canadian cars had Canadian oak in the bodies, not peach wood like the U.S. cars. The first significantly different model was the "224", introduced in 1937 with a Canadian-built 224 cu in (3.7 L) version of the then-new Chevrolet straight-six. After 1940 the 239 cu in (3.9 L) Pontiac Flathead Six was used, but otherwise, the Canadian Pontiacs shared chassis and body parts with the Chevrolets as a measure to reduce the cost of production for the relatively small Canadian market.

After the Second World War, the Pontiac brand continued to be very popular, and the product line was further harmonized with the Canadian Chevrolet products. In the late 1940s and early 1950s, the U.S. market embraced eight-cylinder engines and Pontiacs equipped with the straight-eight engine were popular, but in Canada, the straight-six continued to be the popular offering. Beginning in 1953 the model lineup consisted of the base "Pathfinder", mid-range "Pathfinder Deluxe", and top-of-the-line "Laurentian". The chassis was shared with the Chevrolet, and the interiors were a combination of Chevy and Pontiac parts.

By 1955, the U.S. and Canadian Pontiac lines had diverged almost completely, with the US models positioned as "mid-market" cars available exclusively with the new 287 cu in (4.7 L) Pontiac V8, while in Canada the brand was still positioned as an entry-level marque. The Canadian dealership lines were either Chevrolet-Oldsmobile-Cadillac or Pontiac-Buick-GMC; small towns usually had only one or the other, but not both, so it was imperative to keep Pontiac prices competitive with Plymouth and Ford (and Chevrolet). Producing two entirely separate engine series would have increased costs, so the 261 cu in (4.3 L) Chevrolet straight-six replaced the Pontiac Flathead Six, and the new 265 cu in (4.3 L) Chevrolet V8 replaced the old Pontiac straight-eight.

In 1958, the "Strato-Chief" replaced the "Pathfinder Deluxe", and in 1959 the line was reorganized with "Laurentian" in mid-range and the new "Parisienne" inserted at the top (similar to the U.S. market Bonneville). Even after the Canadian market was opened by the signing of the 1965 Autopact the Canadian full-sized Pontiac lineup—and the practice of building them on Chevrolet chassis with Chevrolet engines—continued mostly unchanged into the 1980s (although the Strato-Chief was dropped in 1970).

GM Canada also built right-hand drive versions of their Pontiacs for export to Australia, New Zealand, and South Africa as knock-down kits until the late 1960s. The interiors of these cars more closely resembled the equivalent Chevrolets than the Canadian market cars did, as the Chevys had already been designed for right-hand drive.

When the compact Chevrolet Corvair and Pontiac Tempest were introduced in 1960 the Corvair was built in Canada, but the Tempest was not. Importing the Tempest into Canada from the United States was not a viable option as the duties that would have had to have been paid would have substantially increased the price of what was supposed to be the least-expensive Pontiac. Tentative plans to build a Pontiac version of the Corvair were scrapped when the more conventional Chevy II was introduced in late-1961. GM Canada developed a new brand exclusively for the Canadian market for their rebadged Chevy IIs, the Acadian. Acadians were sold alongside the rest of the Pontiac lineup at Pontiac-Buick-GMC dealerships until 1971. When the mid-sized Chevrolet Chevelle was introduced in 1964 it was sold in Canada as the Acadian Beaumont ('Beaumont' was formerly the top-level trim of Chevy II-based Acadian), and in 1966 Beaumont became its own marque. The Beaumont-badged Chevelles were in production in Canada until 1969.

Even after the 1965 Autopact (and Canada–United States Free Trade Agreement that replaced it in 1988), the practice of building Pontiac-badged Chevrolets for sale at Canadian dealers continued until the brand was discontinued in 2010. Such cars include the Astre (based on the Vega), the Acadian (based on the Chevette), the Tempest (based on the Corsica), and the Pursuit (based on the Cobalt; later badged as the "G5 Pursuit" and simply "G5"). There were also Pontiac-badged versions of captive imports more commonly known with Chevrolet/Geo badging in the United States: the Sunburst (based on the Isuzu I-Mark/Chevrolet Spectrum), the Firefly (based on the Suzuki Cultus/Chevrolet Sprint), the Sunrunner (based on the Suzuki Vitara/Geo Tracker), and the Wave (based on the Daewoo Kalos/Chevrolet Aveo; later badged the "G3 Wave" and "G3").

== Engines ==
Pontiac engineer Clayton Leach designed the stamped steel valvetrain rocker arm, a simplified and reliable alternative to a bearing-equipped rocker. This design was subsequently picked up by nearly every OHV engine manufacturer at one point or another.

Pontiac began work on a V8 configuration in 1946. This was initially intended to be an L-head engine, and 8 experimental units were built and extensively tested by the end of the 1940s. But testing comparisons to the OHV Oldsmobile V8 revealed the L-head could not compete performance-wise. So, in addition to building a new Pontiac Engineering building in 1949–1951, the decision to re-direct the V8 to an OHV design delayed its introduction until the 1953 model year, however, the Buick division was introducing its new engine (Nail valve V-8) in 1953 and asked the corporation to hold back or delay Pontiac's V8 introduction until the 1955 model year which it did.

In mid-1956, Pontiac introduced a higher-powered version of its V8. Among other things, this version of the engine was equipped with a high-performance racing camshaft and dual 4-barrel carburetors. This was the first in a series of NASCAR-ready pre- Super-Duty V8 engines and introduced the long line of multi-carburetor-equipped engines that saw Pontiac become a major player during the muscle car and pony car era of the 1960s. The enlarged 1956 Pontiac V8 found its way into light-duty GMC pickup trucks.

Pontiac's second-generation V8 engines shared numerous similarities, allowing many parts to interchange from its advent in 1959 to its discontinuation in 1979. Displacement ranged from 287 to 455 cu in (4.7 to 7.5 L). The similarity of the engines (except for the 301 & 265 versions) makes rebuilding these engines relatively easier. This feature also made it possible for Pontiac to develop the modern muscle car, by the relatively simple process of placing its second largest-displacement engine, the 389 cu in (6.4 L) into its mid-size car, the Le Mans, making the Pontiac LeMans GTO.

From their inception in the 1950s until the early 1970s, Pontiac engines were known for their performance. The 455 cu in (7.5 L) V8 was the largest and available in most Pontiacs except in the compact-size cars. At the height of the horsepower era, Pontiac engines reached ratings of 390 hp (291 kW; 395 PS) (SAE gross), though other engines achieved considerably higher outputs. Federal emissions laws eventually brought the horsepower era to a close and resulted in a steady decline for Pontiac's engines. One holdout to this industry-wide slide was the Super Duty 455 engine of 1973–1974. Available only in the Firebird Formula and Trans Am models, this was rated at 310 hp (230 kW) net initially but after having issues passing EPA emissions tests, the camshaft was changed to the old RA III cam, and with the change came a 290 hp (220 kW) net rating. The engine was the pinnacle of Pontiac engine development and was a strong performer that included a few race-specific features, such as provisions for dry-sump oiling.

The only non-traditional Pontiac V8 engines were the 301 cu in (4.9 L) and the 265 cu in (4.3 L). Produced from 1977 through 1981, these engines had the distinction of being the last V8s produced by Pontiac; GM merged its various brands' engines into one collectively shared group in 1980, entitled General Motors Powertrain. The 301 had a 4-inch (100 mm) bore and 3-inch (76 mm) stroke, identical to the 302 cu in (4.9 L) version of the Chevrolet small-block engine and Ford Boss 302 engine.

Pontiac engines were not available in Canada however, but were replaced with Chevrolet engines of similar size and power, resulting in such models as the Beaumont SD-396 with a Chevrolet big-block 396 cu in (6.5 L) V8.

=== Carburetors ===
Pontiac used Carter 1-barrel carburetors for many years but, by the time of the second generation, the V8 engines had switched mostly to 2-barrel offerings. These also were the basis for the Tri-Power setups on the engines.

The Tri-Power setup included one center carburetor with idle control and two end carburetors that did not contribute until the throttle was opened more than halfway. This was accomplished two ways, mechanically for the manual transmission models, and via a vacuum switch on the automatics. This went through various permutations as it was only a factory-installed option from 1957 through 1966.

Pontiac also had a square-bore 4-barrel at the time, but this was rated at lower horsepower than the Tri-Power. This carburetor was later replaced by the Quadrajet, a spread bore. The term "Spread-bore" signifies the difference in sizes between the primaries and secondaries, using smaller primaries paired with larger secondaries for increased airflow at wider throttle with fuel delivery changes akin to the two-plus-four benefit of Tri-Power but with a single carburetor. The Quadrajet was not the only thing that gave the top GTO 400 engine and the 428 H-O engines the same horsepower as the 389 and 421. The new engine had redesigned cylinder heads with different valve angles and larger ports that allowed for larger diameter intake and exhaust valves.

By the end of the muscle car era, the Quadrajet setup had become common on Pontiac engines. The Quadrajet design continued until 1990 for Oldsmobile V8 applications, with added computer controls to meet emissions and fuel economy standards.

== Models ==
- Pontiac 2+2 (1964–1970)
- Pontiac 1000 (1983–1987)
- Pontiac 2000 (1983)
- Pontiac 2000 Sunbird (1983–1984)
- Pontiac 6000 (1982–1991)
- Pontiac Acadian (1976–1987, rebadged Chevrolet Chevette/Pontiac T1000/1000, Canada)
- Pontiac Astre (1975–1977; 1973–1977 Canada)
- Pontiac Aztek (2001–2005)
- Pontiac Bonneville (1957–2005)
- Pontiac Catalina (1959–1981)
- Pontiac Chieftain (1949–1958)
- Pontiac Custom S (1969)
- Pontiac De–Lux (1937)
- Pontiac Executive (1967–1970)
- Pontiac Fiero (1984–1988)
- Pontiac Firebird (1967–2002)
- Pontiac Firefly (1985–2001, rebadged Chevrolet Sprint/Geo Metro/Suzuki Cultus, Canada)
- Pontiac G3 (2006–2009 (Mexico), 2009 (US), rebadged Chevrolet Aveo/Daewoo Gentra)
- Pontiac G4 (2005–2009, rebadged Chevrolet Cobalt, Mexico)
- Pontiac G5 (2007–2009, rebadged Chevrolet Cobalt)
- Pontiac G6 (2004–2010)
- Pontiac G8 (2008–2009, rebadged Holden VE Commodore, Australia)
- Pontiac GT–37 (1970–1971)
- Pontiac Grand Am (1973–1975, 1978–1980, 1985–2005)
- Pontiac Grand Prix (1962–2008)
- Pontiac Grand Safari (1971–1978)
- Pontiac Grand Ville (1971–1975)
- Pontiac Grande Parisienne (1966–1969, Canada)
- Pontiac GTO (1964–1974, 2004–2006 as rebadged Holden Monaro)
- Pontiac J2000 (1982)
- Pontiac Laurentian (1955–1981, Canada)
- Pontiac LeMans (1962–1981, 1988–1993)
- Pontiac Matiz (1998–2005, rebadged Chevrolet Matiz, Mexico)
- Pontiac Matiz G2 (2006–2010, rebadged Chevrolet Matiz, Mexico)
- Pontiac Montana (1999–2005)
- Pontiac Montana SV6 (2005–2006, continued in production for Canada and Mexico until 2009)
- Pontiac Parisienne (1983–1986; 1958–1986, Canada)
- Pontiac Pathfinder (1955–1958, Canada)
- Pontiac Phoenix (1977–1984)
- Pontiac Pursuit (later G5 Pursuit) (2005–2006, rebadged Chevrolet Cobalt, Canada)
- Pontiac Safari (1955–1989)
- Pontiac Silver Streak
- Pontiac Solstice (2006–2009)
- Pontiac Star Chief (1954–1966)
- Pontiac Star Chief Executive (1966)
- Pontiac Strato-Chief (1955–1970, Canada)
- Pontiac Streamliner (1942–1951)
- Pontiac Sunbird (1975–1980, 1985–1994)
- Pontiac Sunburst (1985–1989, rebadged Chevrolet Spectrum/Isuzu Gemini, Canada)
- Pontiac Sunfire (1995–2005)
- Pontiac Sunrunner (1994–1997, rebadged Geo Tracker/Suzuki Escudo, Canada)
- Pontiac Super Chief (1957–1958)
- Pontiac T1000 (1981–1982)
- Pontiac T-37 (1970–1971)
- Pontiac Tojan (1985–1991)
- Pontiac Tempest (1961–1970; 1987–1991, rebadged Chevrolet Corsica, Canada)
- Pontiac Torpedo (1940–1948)
- Pontiac Torrent (2006–2009)
- Pontiac Trans Am (1969–2002)
- Pontiac Trans Sport (1990–1998)
- Pontiac Ventura (1960–1970 full-size, 1973–1977 compact)
- Pontiac Ventura II (1971–1972)
- Pontiac Vibe (2003–2010, rebadged Toyota Voltz)
- Pontiac Wave (later G3 Wave) (2004–2010, rebadged Chevrolet Aveo/Daewoo Gentra, Canada)

== Evolution of models ==
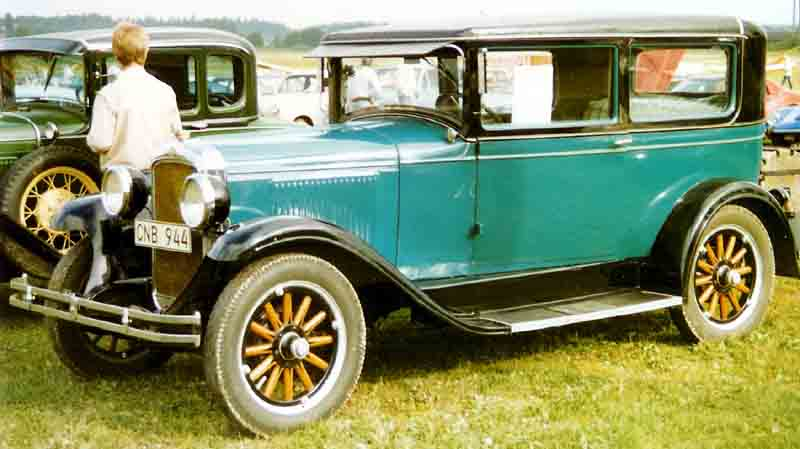
1928 Pontiac New Series 6-28 8240 2-door Sedan

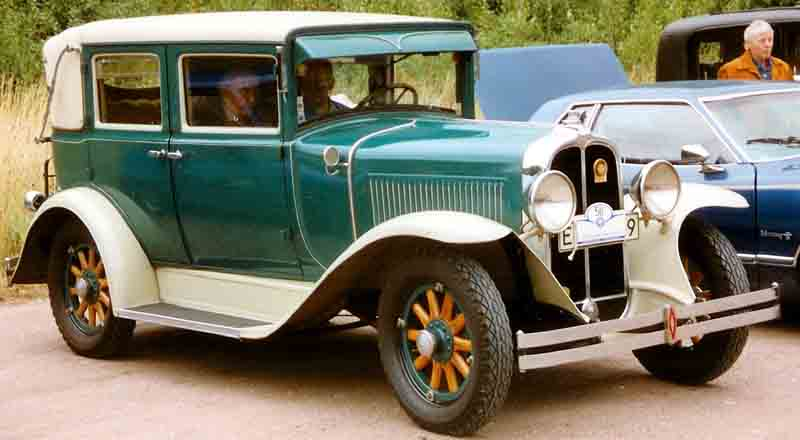
1929 Pontiac Big Six Series 6-29 8930 4-Door Landaulette

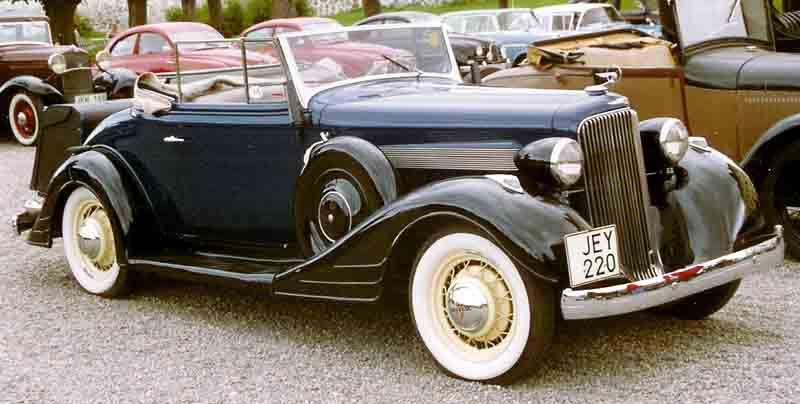
1934 Pontiac Series 603 34318 Convertible Coupé

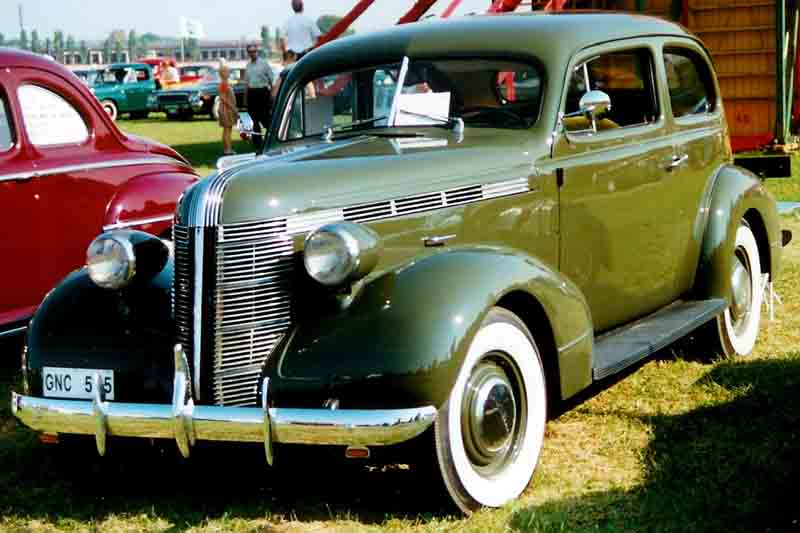
1937 Pontiac De Luxe Series 26 2611 2-door Touring Coach

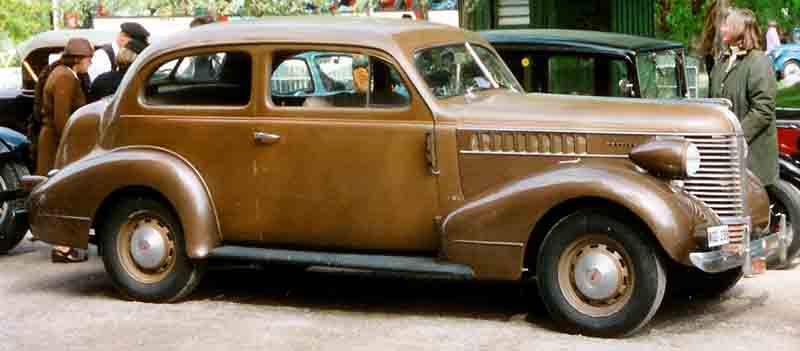
1938 Pontiac De Luxe Series 26 2611 2-door Touring Sedan

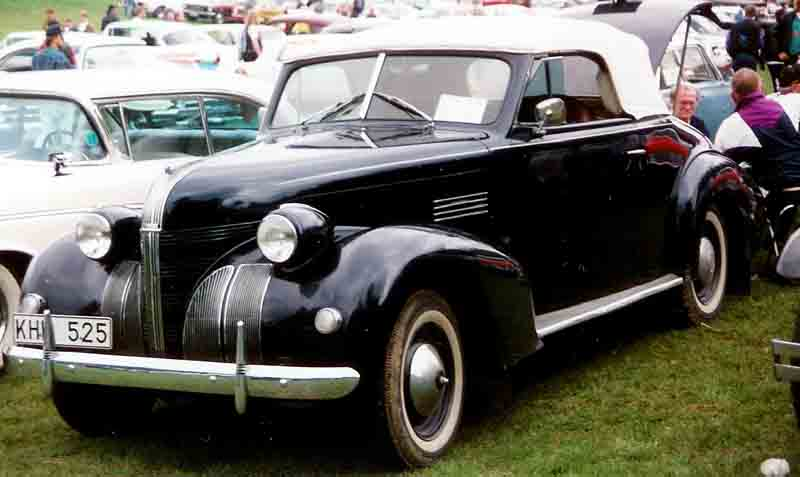
1939 Pontiac De Luxe Convertible Coupé

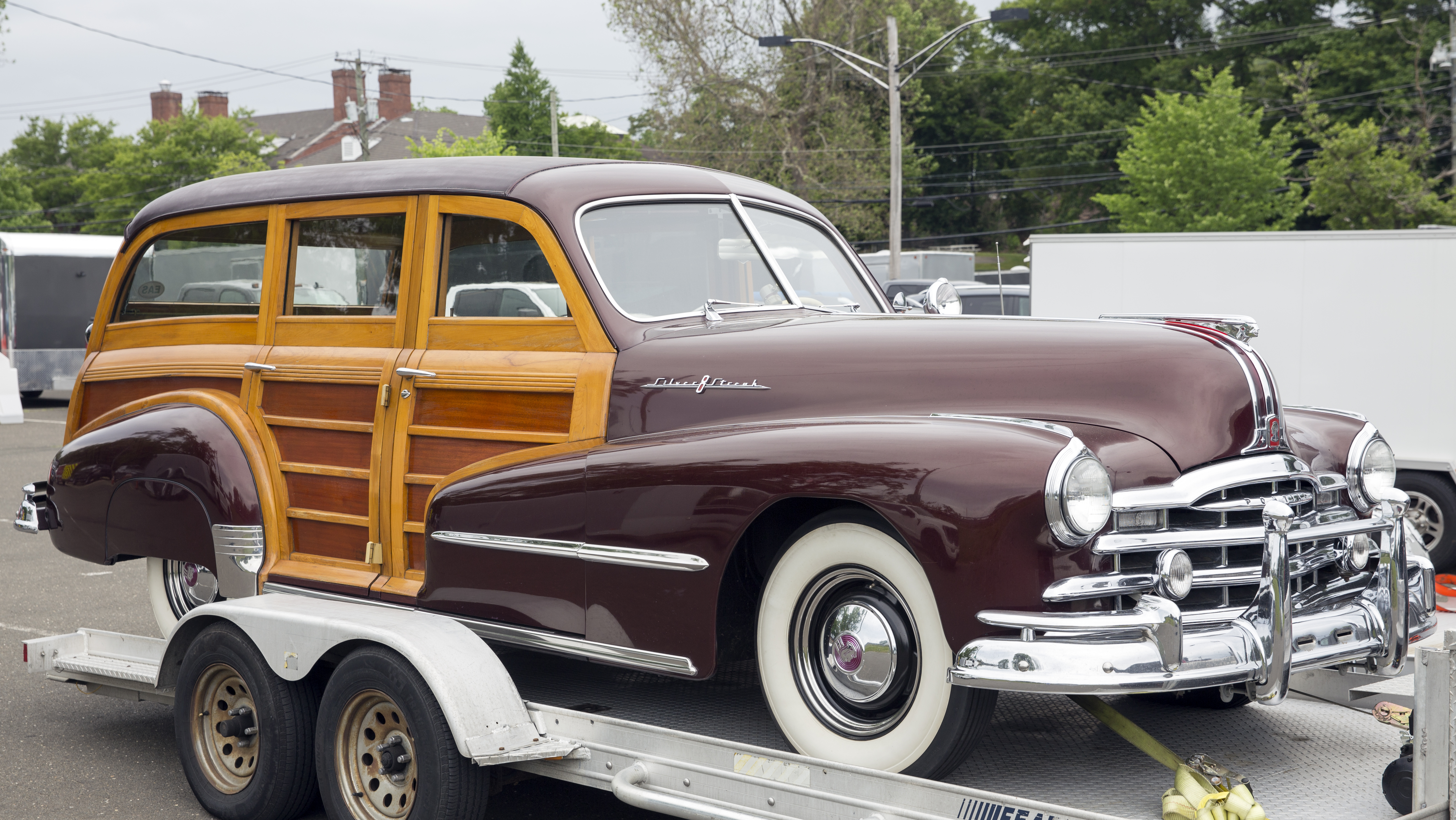
1948 Pontiac Streamliner Station Wagon

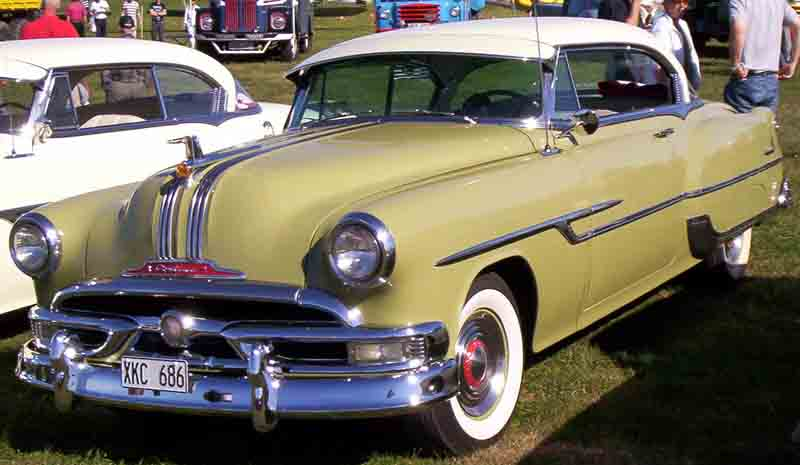
1953 Pontiac Chieftain Catalina

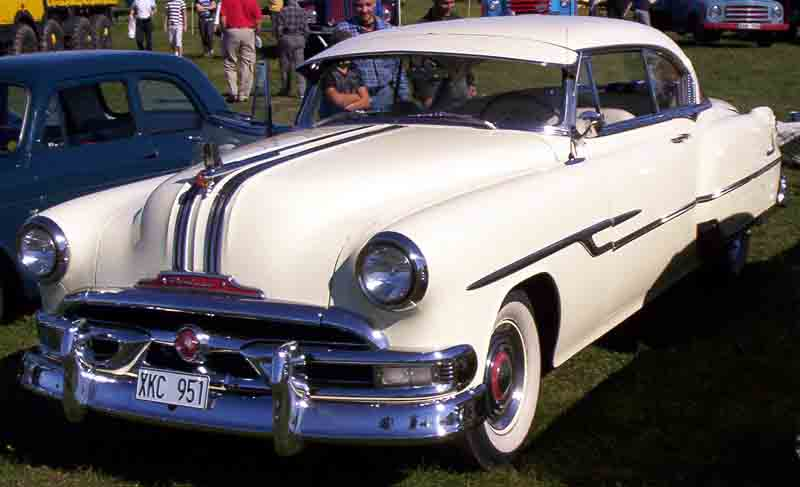
1953 Pontiac Chieftain Catalina

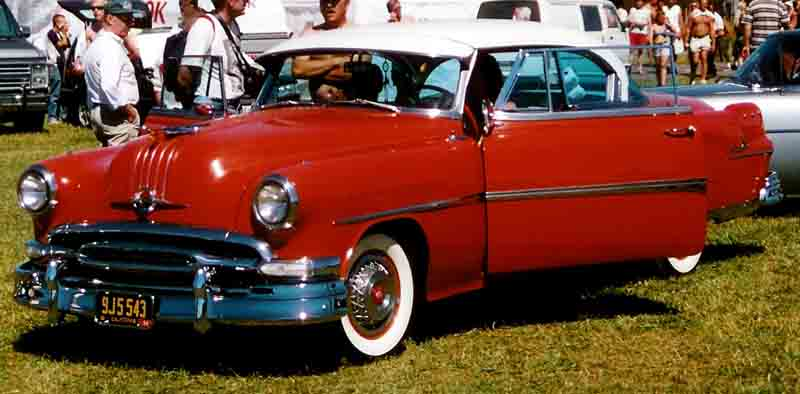
1954 Pontiac Star Chief

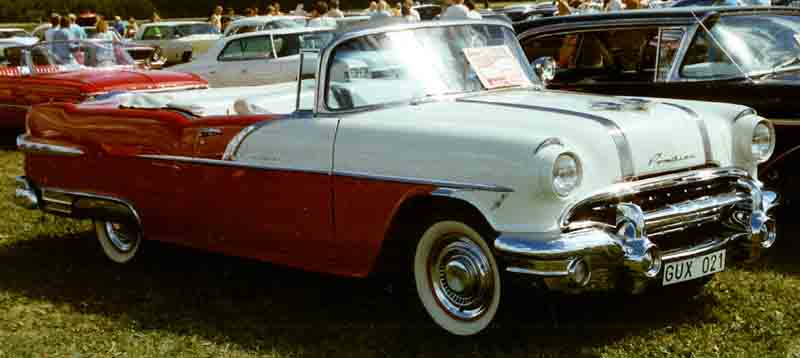
1956 Pontiac Laurentian Convertible

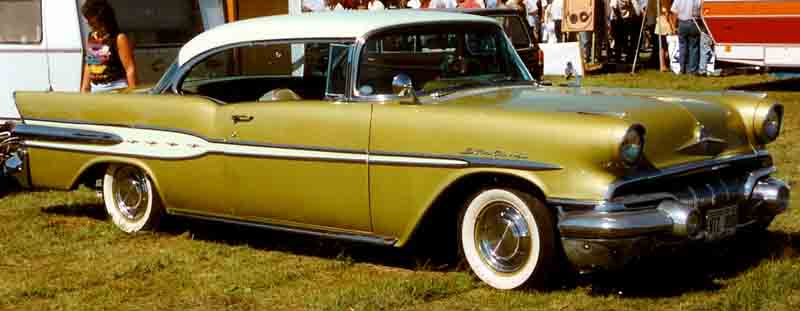
1957 Pontiac Star Chief

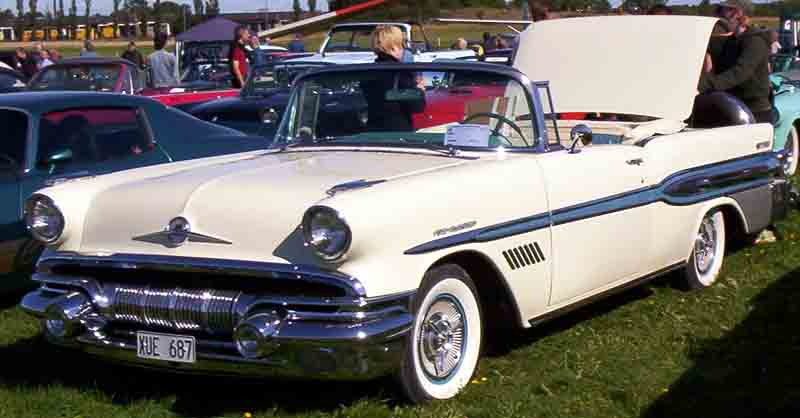
1957 Pontiac Bonneville Convertible

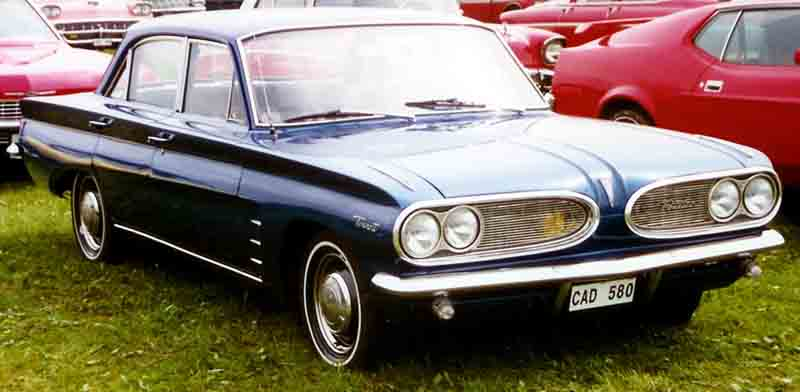
1961 Pontiac 2119 Tempest

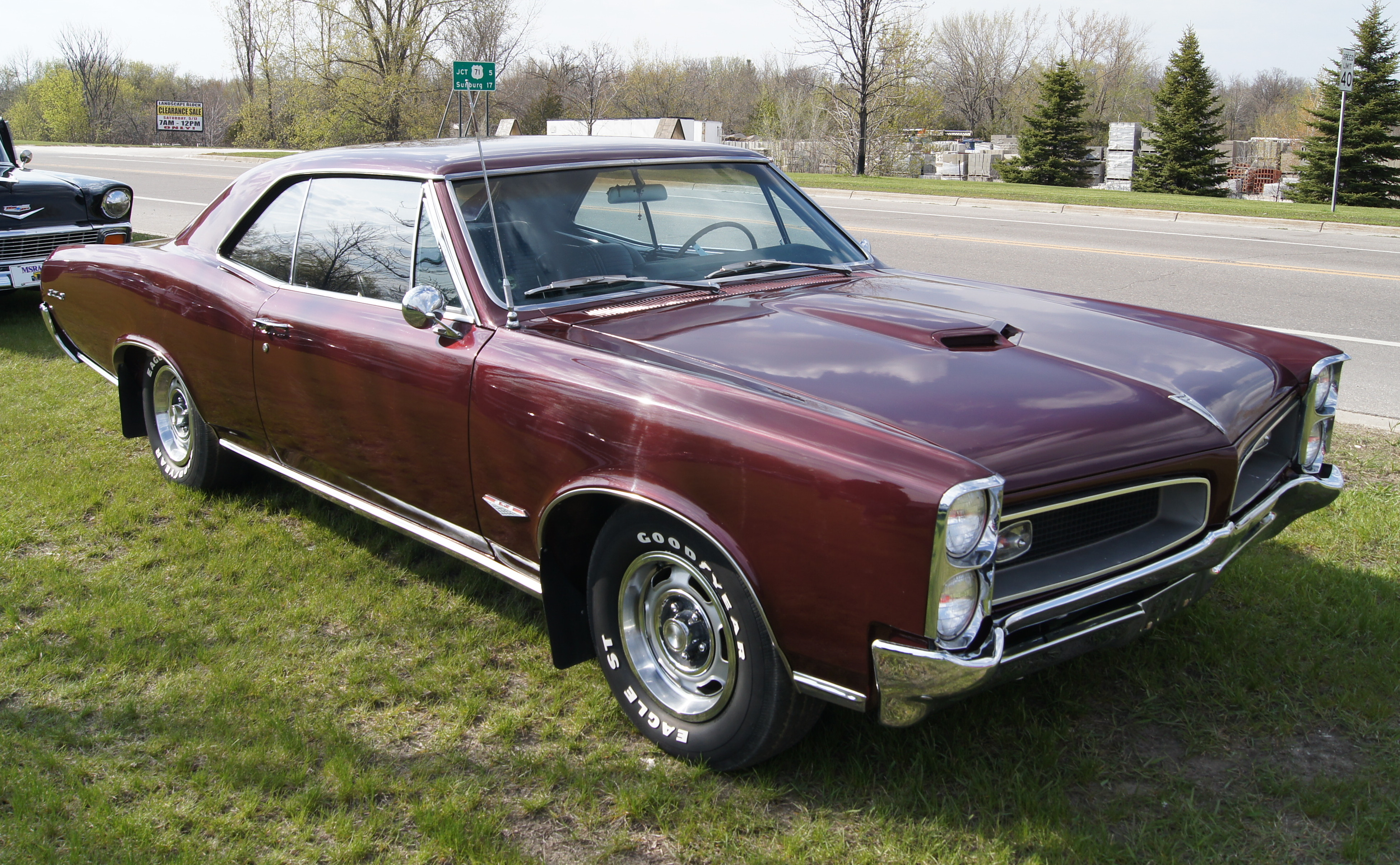
1966 Pontiac GTO

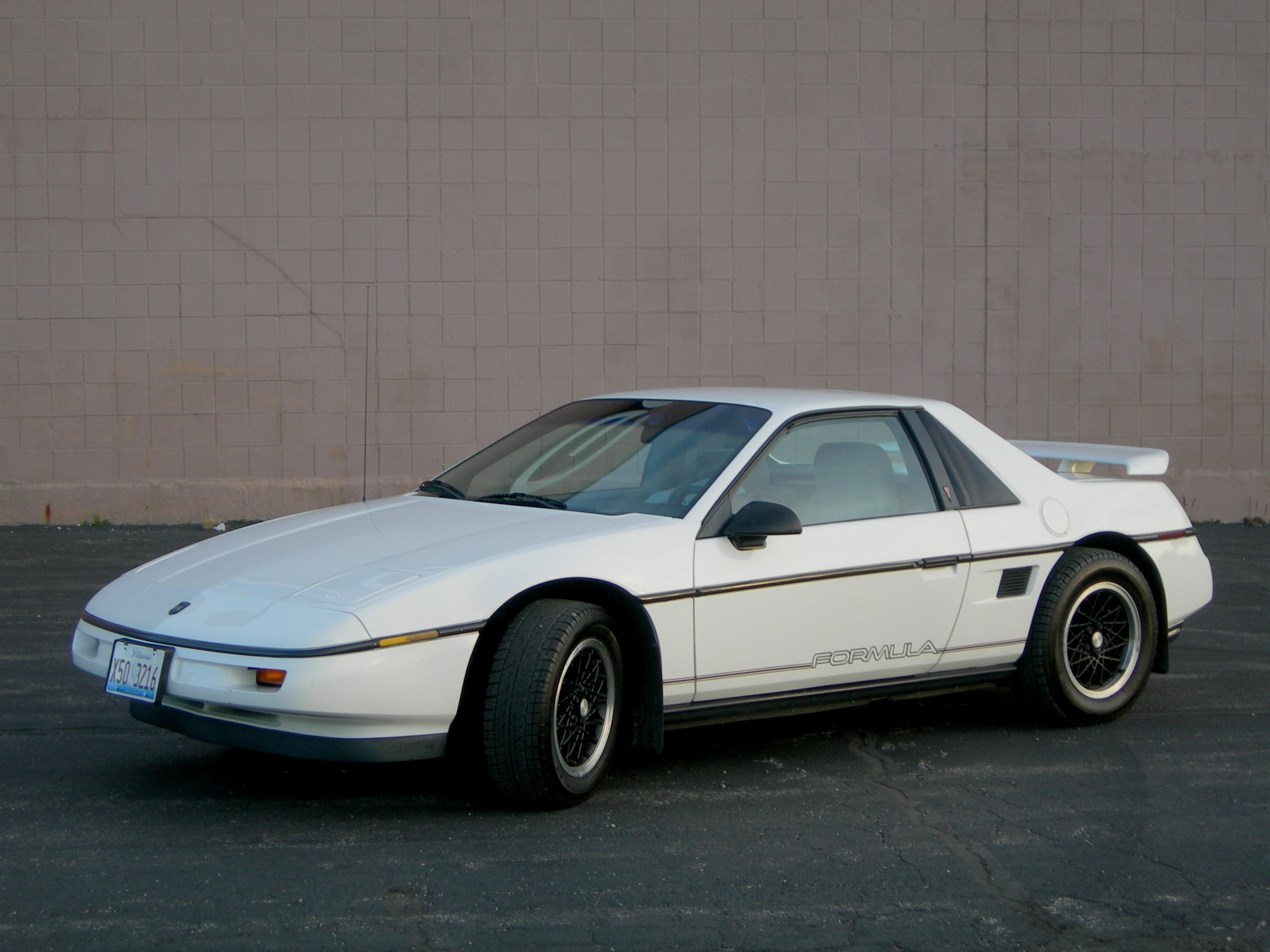
1988 Pontiac Fiero

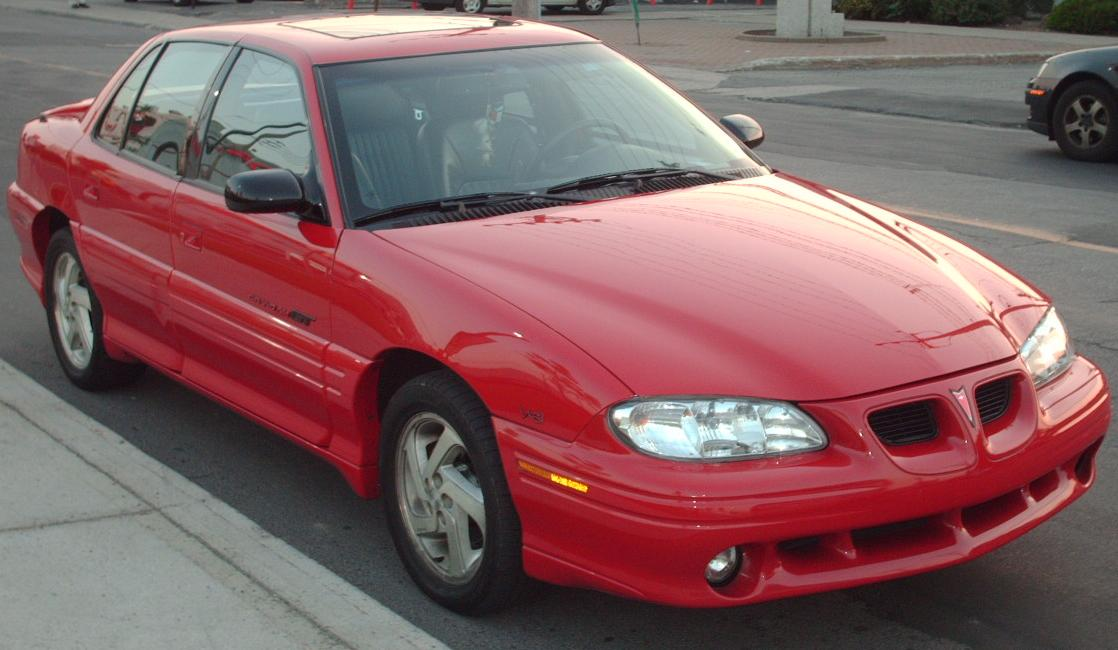
1996–1998 Pontiac Grand Am Sedan

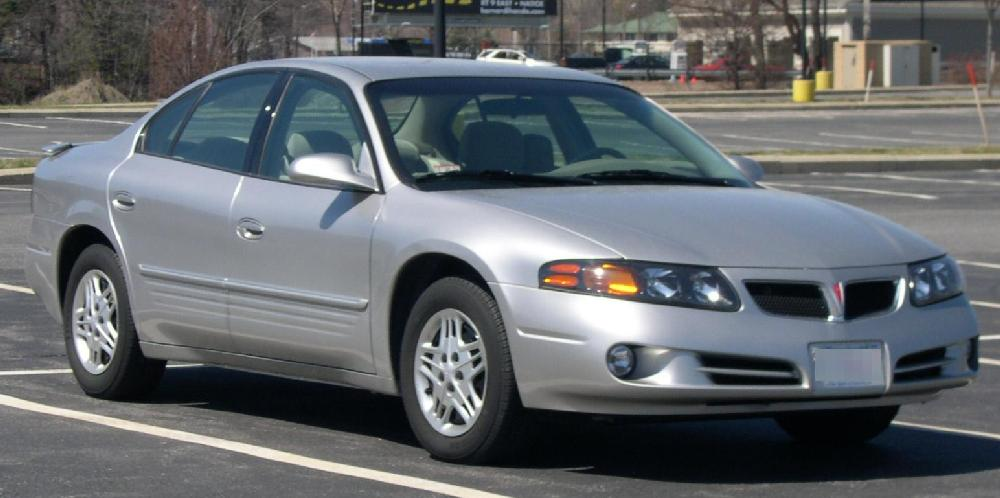
2003 Pontiac Bonneville

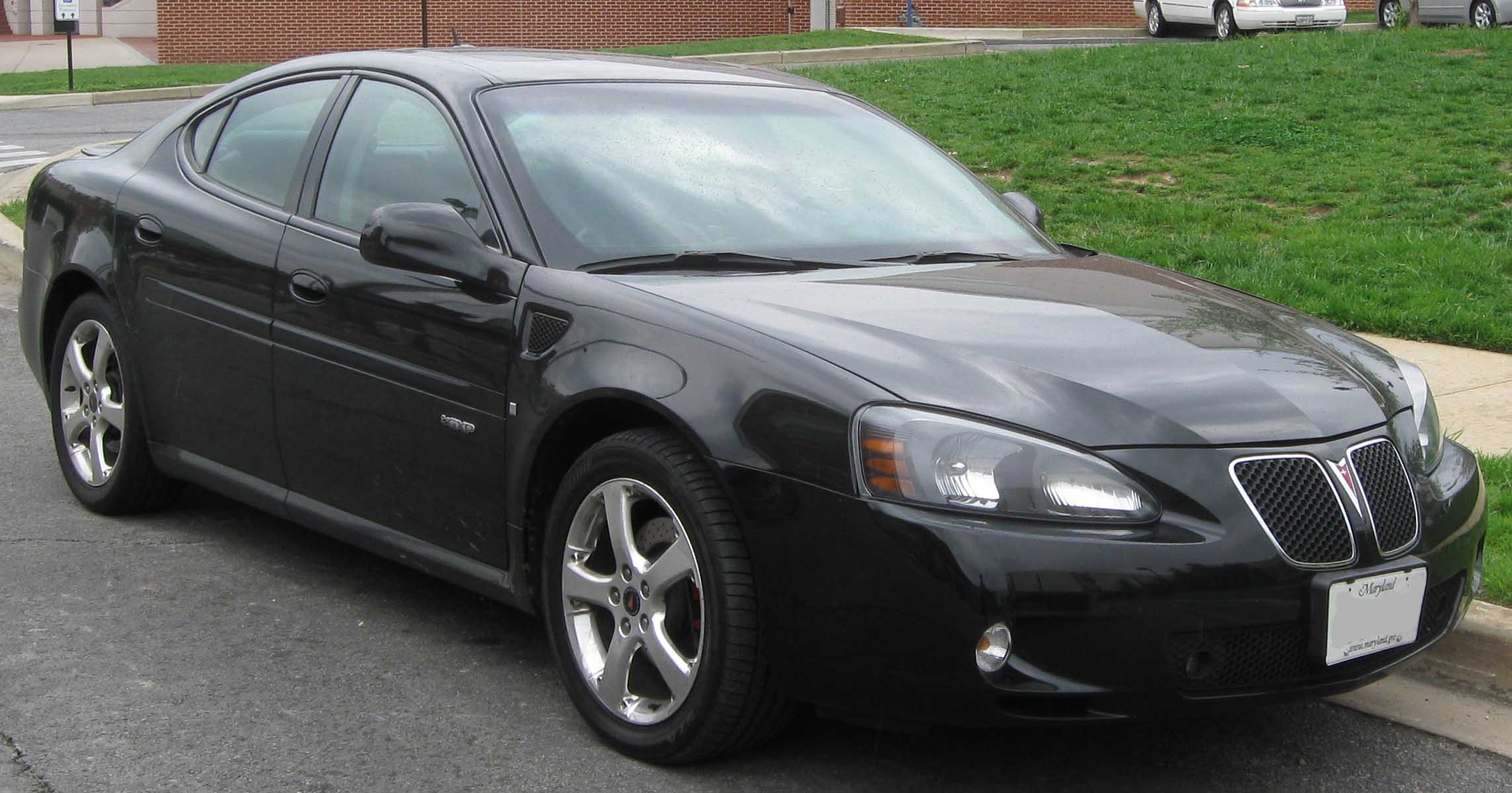
2005 Pontiac Grand Prix GTP

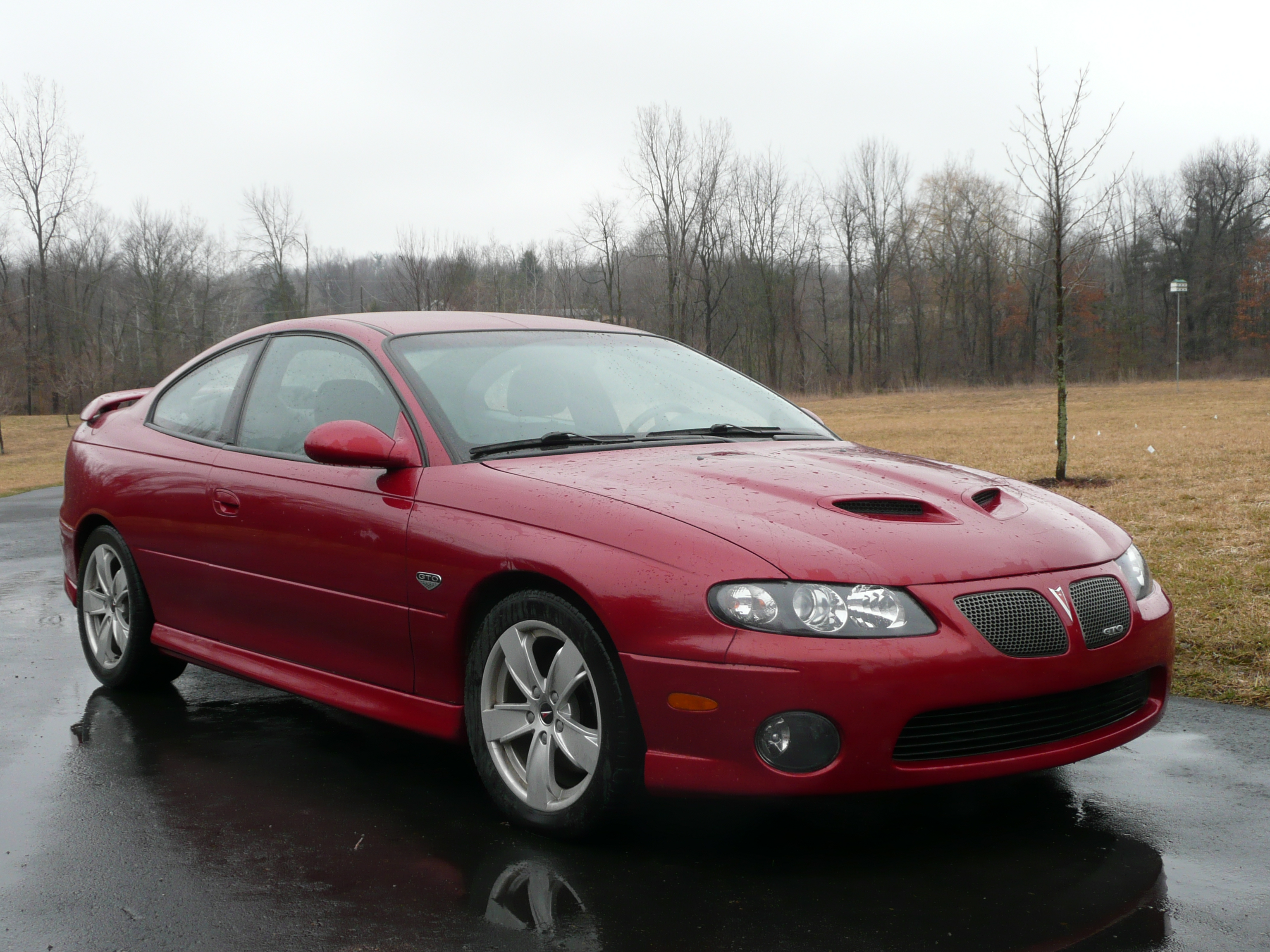
2006 Pontiac GTO

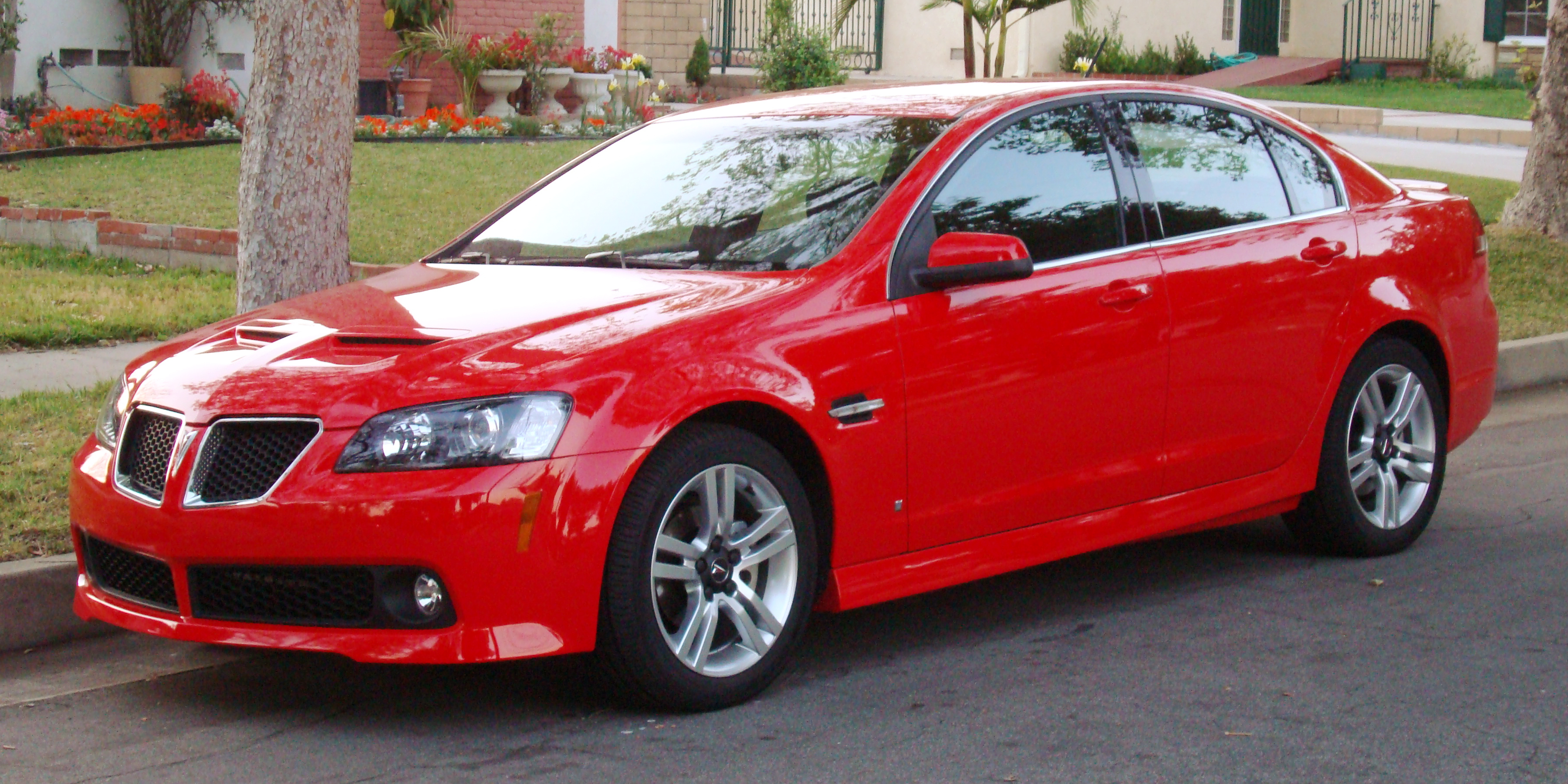
2008 Pontiac G8

== See also ==
- Category:Pontiac vehicles
- List of GM engines
- Pontiac (person)
- Pontiac V8 engine
- Pontiac Straight-6 engine
- Pontiac Straight-8 engine
- Pontiac, Michigan

== Bibliography ==
- Flammang, James; Kowalke, Ron (1999). The Standard Catalog of American Cars 1976–1999. Krause Publications. ISBN 0-87341-755-0.
- Gunnell, John, ed. (1987). The Standard Catalog of American Cars 1946–1975. Krause Publications. ISBN 0-87341-096-3.
- Wangers, Jim (1998). Glory Days: When Horsepower and Passion Ruled Detroit. Bentley. ISBN 9780837602080.
