= Chevrolet Tracker (Americas) =

Mini suburban utility vehicle by General Motors

Geo/Chevrolet Tracker
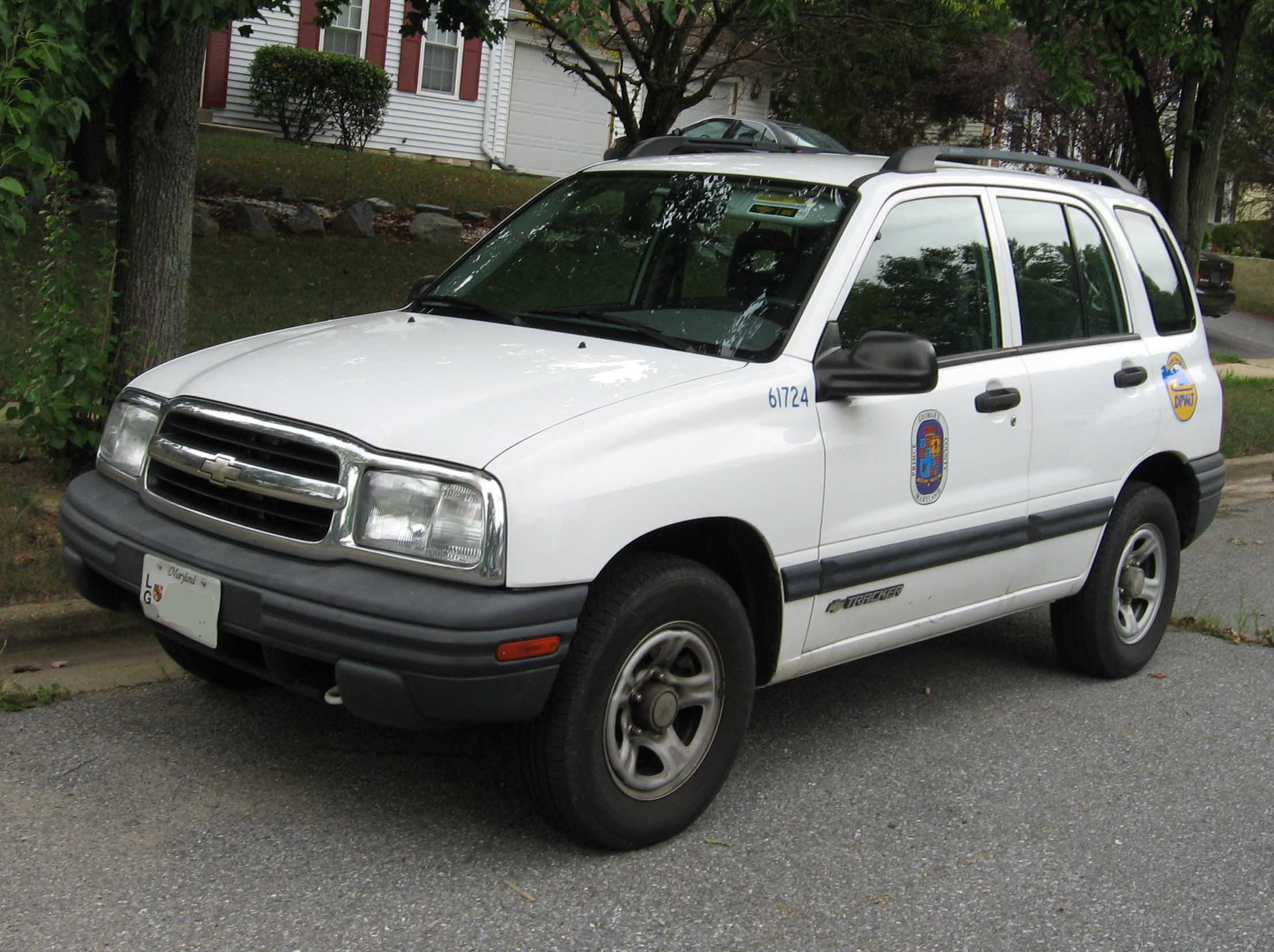

Overview
- Manufacturer: Suzuki; General Motors; CAMI Automotive
- Production: 1988–1990 (Japan); 1989–2004 (Canada/U.S.); 2004–2007 (Argentina); 1996–2016 (Ecuador)

Body and chassis
- Class: Mini SUV; Compact SUV
- Body style: 4-door SUV; 2-door convertible 2-door SUV
- Layout: Front engine, rear-wheel drive / four-wheel drive

Dimensions
- Wheelbase: 4-door: 2480mm
- Length: 4-door: 4135mm
- Width: 4-door: 1710mm
- Height: 4-door: 1685mm

Chronology
- Successor: Pontiac Aztek (Canada); Chevrolet Equinox (U.S. & Canada); Chevrolet Captiva (Mexico); Chevrolet Trax (Europe); Chevrolet Tracker (2019)

The Chevrolet Tracker, formerly the Geo Tracker, is a mini SUV produced for Chevrolet and Geo by CAMI Automotive in Ingersoll, Ontario. The Tracker was produced under many brands in several different editions and in many countries.

== First generation ==
First generation
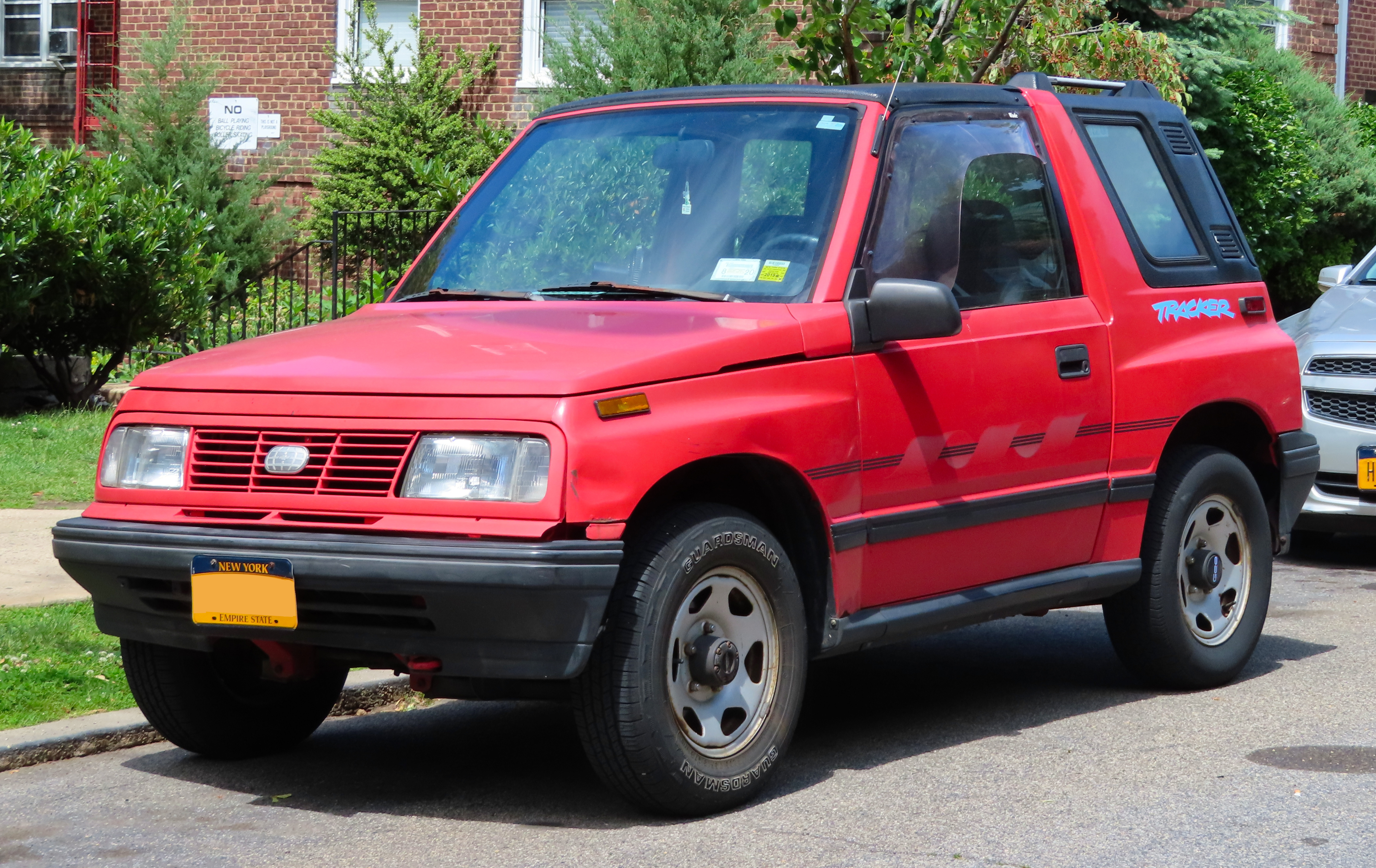

Overview
- Also called: Chevrolet Tracker (1998 & 1989–1991 Canada); GMC Tracker; Asüna Sunrunner; Pontiac Sunrunner; Chevrolet Vitara
- Production: 1989–1998
- Assembly: Hamamatsu, Japan; Ingersoll, Ontario, Canada; Kosai, Japan; Quito, Ecuador

Body and chassis
- Related: Suzuki Escudo; Suzuki Sidekick; Suzuki Samurai; Suzuki Vitara; Suzuki Jimny; Suzuki X-90

Powertrain
- Engine: 1.6 L G16 (LS5/L01) I4
- Transmission: 5-speed manual 3-speed GM TH180 automatic 4-speed Aisin 03-72LE automatic

Dimensions
- Wheelbase: 2-door: 86.6 in (2,200 mm); 4-door: 97.6 in (2,479 mm)
- Length: 2-door:142.5 in (3,620 mm) (1989–1995); 143.7 in (3,650 mm) (1996–98); 4-door: 158.7 in (4,031 mm)
- Width: 2-door: 64.2 in (1,631 mm); 4-door: 64.4 in (1,636 mm)
- Height: 2-door: 65 in (1,651 mm) (1989–1991); 65.6 in (1,666 mm) (1992–93); 64.3 in (1,633 mm) (2WD, 1994–98); 65.1 in (1,654 mm) (4WD 1994–98); 4-door: 65.7 in (1,669 mm) (2WD); 66.5 in (1,689 mm) (4WD); GMC Tracker: 65.8 in (1,671 mm)

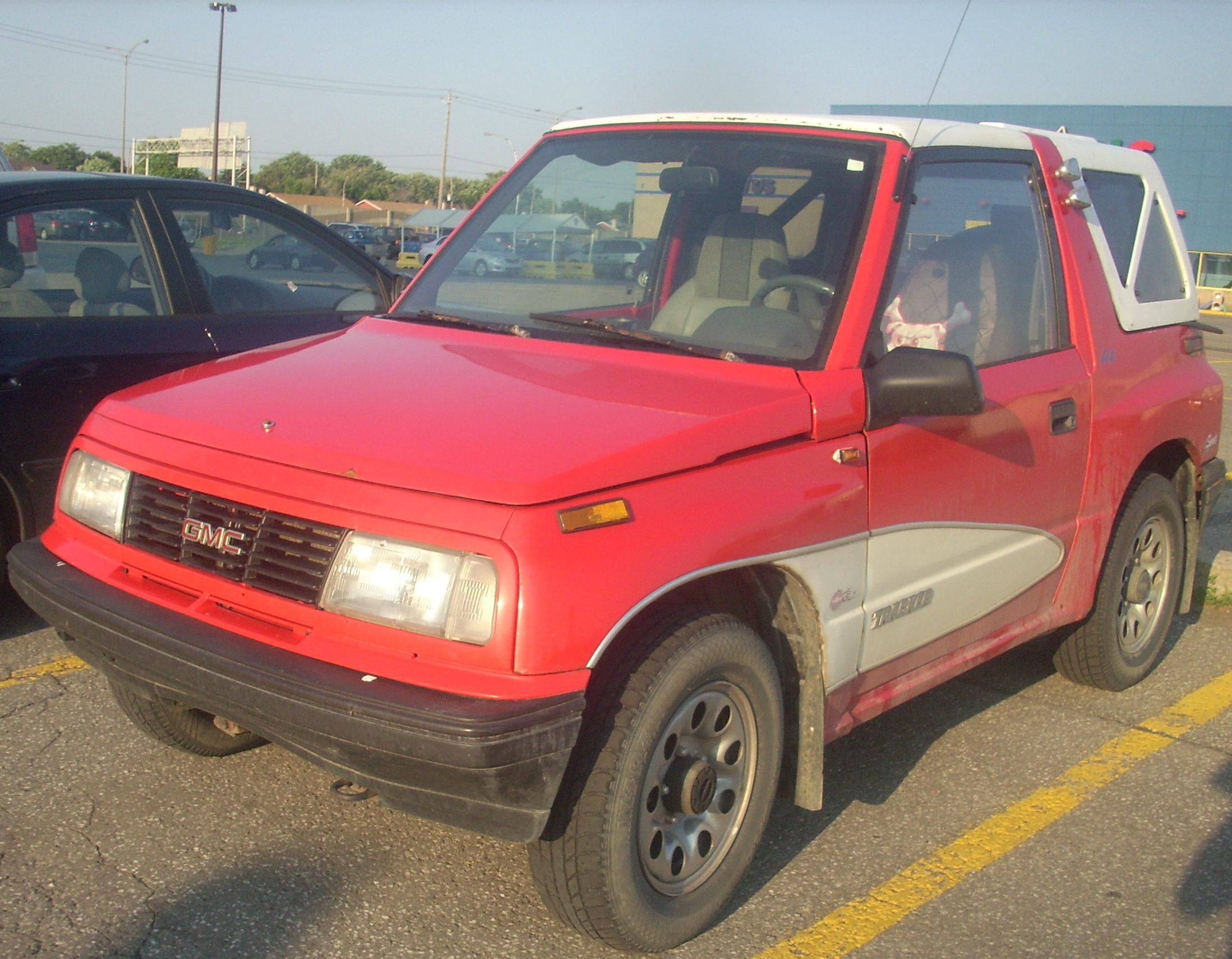
GMC Tracker (Canada)

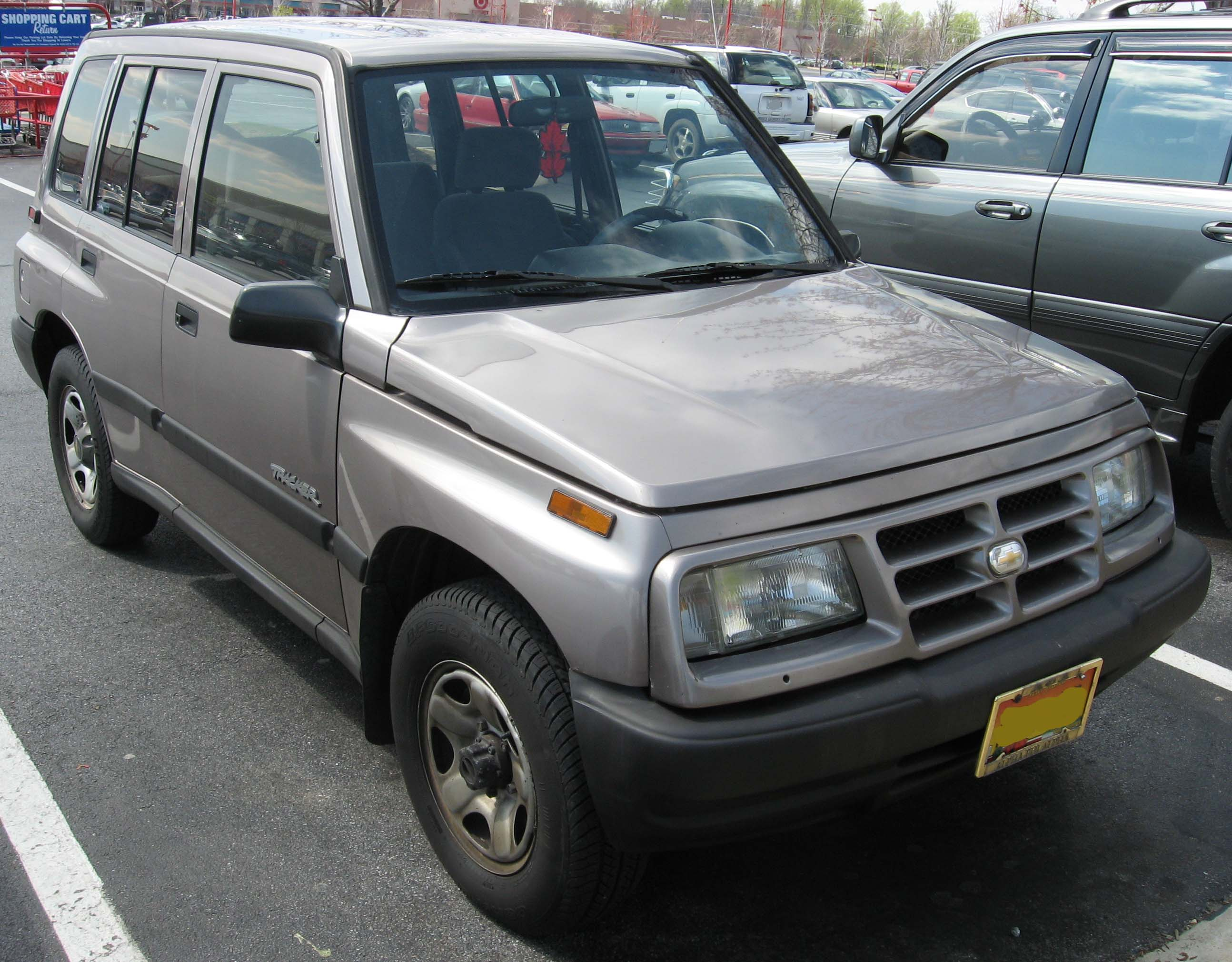
1998 Chevrolet Tracker 4-door

The Geo Tracker was a mini SUV introduced in late 1988 as a 1989 model. It was developed by CAMI which was a joint venture between General Motors of Canada and Suzuki. North American models were to be built in CAMI's Ingersoll, Ontario, Canada plant alongside its almost identical twin, the domestic-built Suzuki Sidekick (Escudo). Nearly all 1989 and some 1990 Trackers were built in Japan and imported to the US because of delays at the CAMI factory in Canada. In late 1989, production began in Ingersoll with about 6,100 Geo Trackers finished, with annual production projected to be around 200,000 units. In the beginning, all Canadian-made Trackers were sent to the United States to circumvent the 25 percent Chicken Tax; the Canadian market was supplied entirely from Japan. Suzuki Sidekicks were added to the production line during 1990.

The Tracker was originally powered by Suzuki's 1.6L SOHC four-cylinder engine producing 80 hp (60 kW). The trim levels in 1989 were base convertible, base two-door hardtop, two-door XL bed, and LSi hardtop. LSi equipment included air conditioner, chrome rally wheels, intermittent wipers, rear window wiper/washer, spare tire cover, three-speed GM Turbo-Hydramatic 180 automatic transmission, tinted glass, and special red/black front and rear bucket seats. In 1990 the LSi trim was made available on the convertible models also. All Trackers were four-wheel drive until a base two-wheel drive convertible was introduced in 1992. The two-door hardtop models were available until 1995 when they were discontinued to make way for the four-door hardtop wagon that was to be introduced the following year. The two-door XL bed was a North America only edition which came with four more inches in the rear and a sealed two door cab. Although Suzuki started importing four-door Sidekicks in 1991, CAMI did not start producing them until the 1996 model year, when America got a four-door Geo Tracker, now powered by Suzuki's G16B 16-valve 1.6L boasting 96 hp (72 kW). In 1997, the Geo nameplate was merged back into Chevrolet and all Geo models, including the Tracker, Tracker XL, and all subsequent editions were rebadged as Chevrolet in 1998.

The Tracker was different from most other light SUVs on the market in that it is based on a rugged light-truck chassis and certified as a light truck. Although it appeared to be a comfortable passenger SUV, it was bolstered by a sturdy off-road four-wheel-drive system with a conventional light truck engine and transmission coupled to a hi-lo, 2-4 transfer case. The Tracker had a strong front suspension with a rugged recirculating ball steering box. The conventional front differential was rigidly mounted ahead of the engine, with CV axles connecting the coil-spring front hubs to the differential case. The rear axle was a conventional light truck unit on coil springs. As a result of the truck-like underpinnings, the Tracker had a fairly truck-like ride, but the benefit was its notable durability in harsh conditions.

The production of the first-generation model of the Tracker (and Sidekick) came to an end in Ontario after 1998 in order to make way for the second generation of Tracker/Vitara. However, the first generation Sidekick continued in production in other countries until 2004.

=== Canada ===
When the Geo Tracker was introduced in the United States, the Geo brand was not available in Canada. Because of this the Tracker was introduced there as both the Chevrolet Tracker and the GMC Tracker. The Chevrolet Tracker was sold at Chevrolet dealerships in Canada starting in 1989. Initially there were three models: a base convertible, base hardtop and a CL hardtop (CL is equivalent to the LSi in the Geo line). In 1990 a CL convertible was added to the line-up. 1991 was the last year for the Chevrolet Tracker as the Geo marque was brought to Canada in 1992 and all Chevrolet Trackers were renamed Geo Trackers, yet they continued to display the Chevrolet "bowtie" symbol on the front grille emblem until the end of production in 1998. All 1989–1990 Chevrolet Trackers were four-wheel drive. From 1991 on, the Geo Tracker sold in Canada was identical to its US counterpart. The GMC Tracker was also introduced for the 1989 model year to be sold at Pontiac-Buick-GMC dealerships in Canada. Just like the Chevrolet and Geo initially there were three models: base convertible, base hardtop and SLE hardtop (SLE being equipped the same as the CL and LSi of the other marques). In 1990 an SLE convertible was added to the lineup. 1991 was the last year for the GMC Tracker as GM introduced the Asüna marque in 1992 and the GMC Tracker was renamed the Asüna Sunrunner. The Sunrunner was marketed as more upmarket and had no base model, with all of the Sunrunners being equipped like the SLEs were. The Asüna brand did not last long though, and after only two years (1992 and 1993) the Sunrunner was rebranded as a Pontiac. The Pontiac Sunrunner was sold in Canada from 1994 to 1998 in both base and top-of-the-line GT trim. It was available in two- and four-wheel drive and in both convertible and hardtop body-styles. While the Geo Tracker was also sold as a four-door wagon beginning in 1996, the Sunrunner never got this body style. The Sunrunner was discontinued without a direct replacement in 1998.

== Second generation ==
Second generation
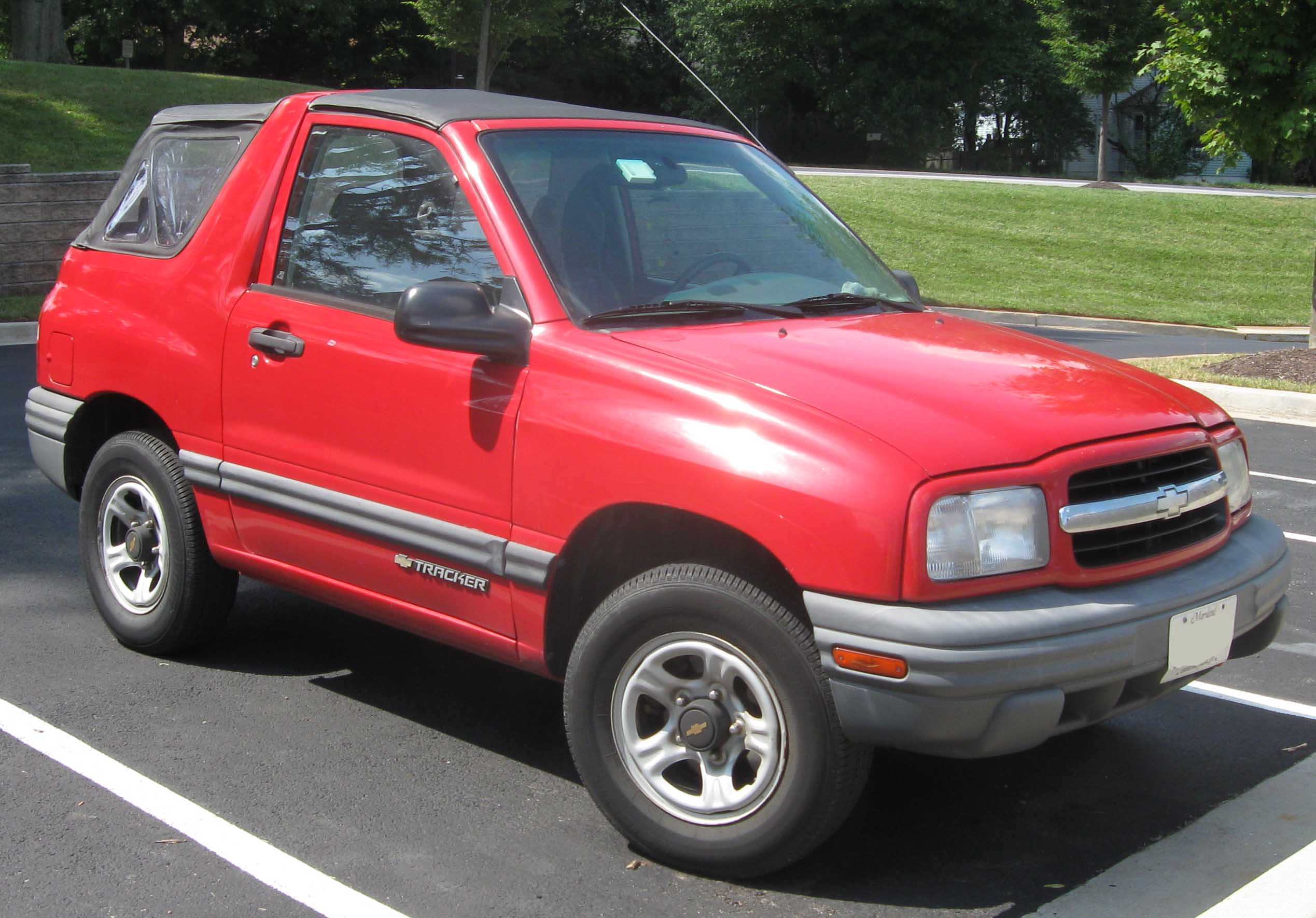

Overview
- Also called: Suzuki Vitara
- Production: 1999–2004 (Canada); 1999–2008 (Argentina); 1999–2016 (Ecuador)
- Model years: 1999–2004 (Canada); 2000–2008 (Argentina); 2001-2017 (Ecuador)
- Assembly: Ingersoll, Ontario, Canada; Kosai, Japan; Quito, Ecuador; Rosario, Argentina

Body and chassis
- Platform: GMT190
- Related: Suzuki Escudo; Suzuki Samurai; Suzuki Vitara; Suzuki Grand Vitara; Suzuki XL-7; Chevrolet Tracker; Suzuki Jimny; Suzuki X-90

Powertrain
- Engine: 1.6 L L01 I4; 2.0 L J20A I4 130 hp 2.5 L H25A V6 155 hp
- Transmission: 5-speed manual 4-speed Aisin 03-72LE (A44DE) automatic

Dimensions
- Wheelbase: 2-door: 86.6 in (2,200 mm); 4-door: 97.6 in (2,479 mm)
- Length: 2-door 2WD: 151.6 in (3,851 mm); 2-door 4WD: 151.8 in (3,856 mm); 4-door 2WD: 162.6 in (4,130 mm); 4-door 4WD: 162.8 in (4,135 mm)
- Width: 67.3 in (1,709 mm)
- Height: 2002–04 2-door 2WD: 65.7 in (1,669 mm); 2-door 4WD & 1999–2001 2WD 2-door: 66.5 in (1,689 mm); 4-door 2WD: 65.6 in (1,666 mm); 4-door 4WD: 66.3 in (1,684 mm)

In 1999, the Sidekick was discontinued, and a second generation Tracker was introduced, differing from the Sidekick's successor, the Grand Vitara. A Suzuki version of this North American-exclusive Tracker was sold in the North American market as a Suzuki Vitara, which is shorter than the Grand Vitara. In Mexico, the second-generation Tracker remained in production and was sold there as Chevrolet Tracker. The Tracker series was discontinued in the United States and Canada in 2004, but all models including the LJ80/Jimny are still in production in other Suzuki plants. Some Trackers and Sidekicks were made at a Suzuki plant in Kosai, Japan.

The 1st generation Tracker was sold as the Chevrolet Vitara in Latin America, and the 2nd generation Tracker is sold as the Chevrolet Grand Vitara in Latin American countries. In North America, the first generation Tracker was sold as a Chevrolet in 1998 after GM discontinued the Geo brand. In Latin America, GM made the Suzuki Vitara/Grand Vitara and sold it as Chevrolet Vitara/Grand Vitara (Colombia, Ecuador and Venezuela produced in GM Ecuador) or Suzuki Grand Vitara (Argentina) and Chevrolet Tracker (Brazil and Mexico) - both produced by GM Argentina. On January 27, 2004, production of the Chevrolet Tracker was discontinued at the CAMI plant in Ingersoll, Ontario, and replaced with the Chevrolet Equinox.

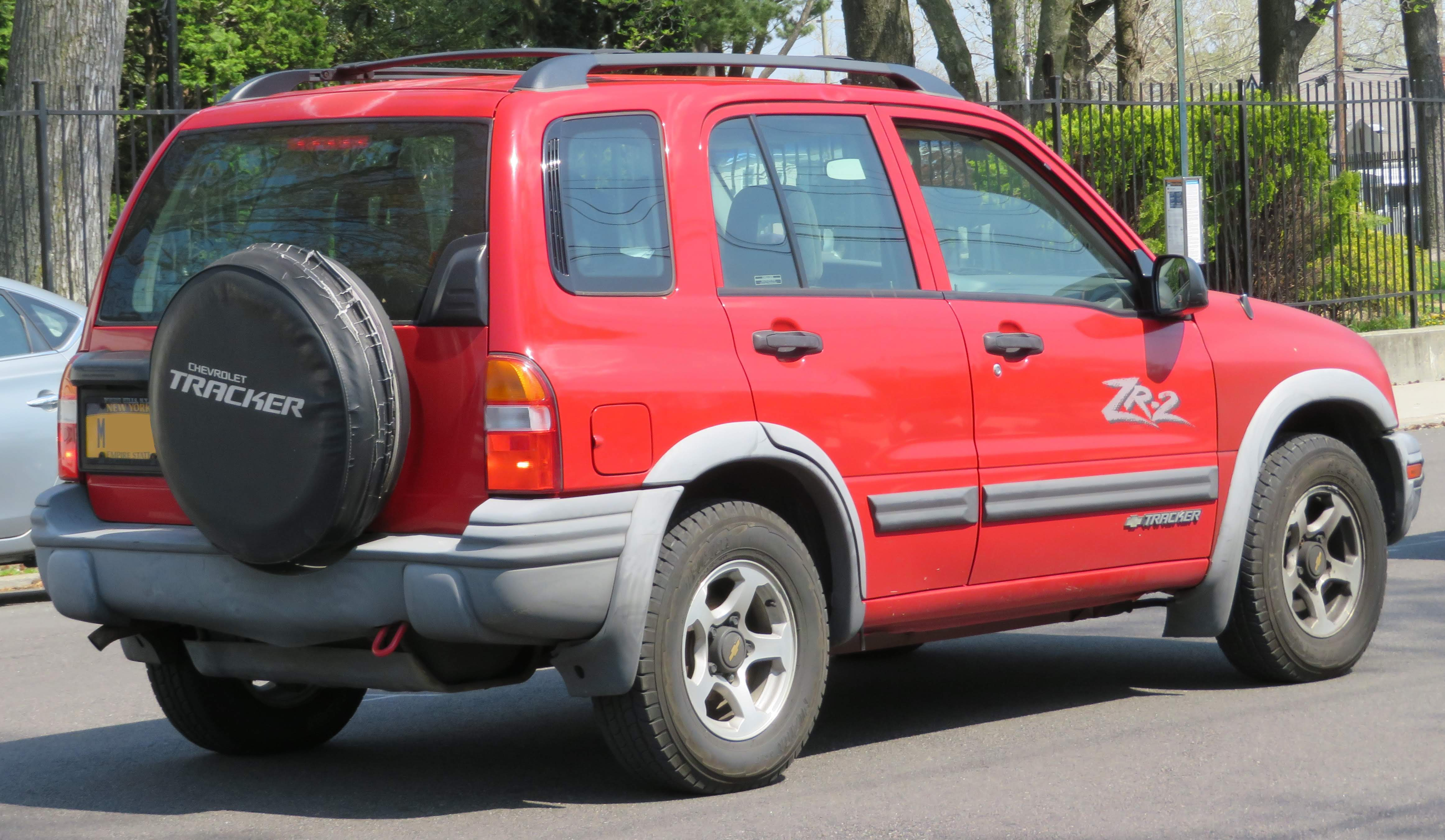
Rear view

== Markets ==
=== Mexico ===
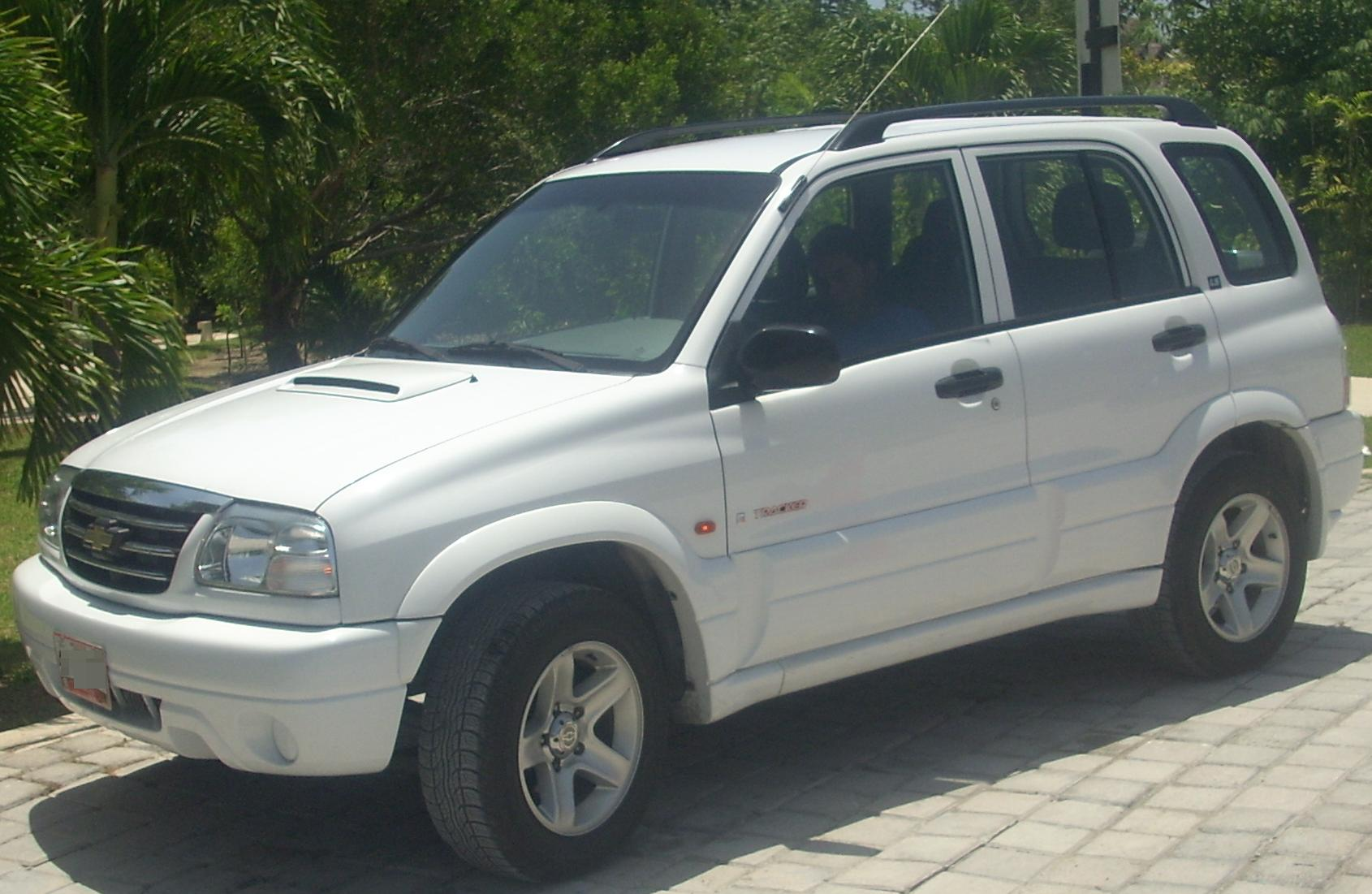
2006–2008 Chevrolet Tracker (Mexico)

Geo Tracker was sold since 1994 (Imported from Canada) three-door soft top 4WD or 2WD, automatic or manual transmissions. In 1996 Geo Tracker was dropped, and back 1998 from Canada as Chevrolet Tracker three-door soft top or five-door hard top available in 2WD or 4WD automatic or manual. In 2000, a new generation Chevrolet Tracker was available as a three-door soft top or five-door hard top 2WD or 4WD, manual or automatic; in 2001 the soft top was dropped. The V6 option with 2WD or 4WD automatic was available from 2002 to 2004. Even though the Tracker was discontinued in the U.S. and Canada, the Tracker continued sales in Mexico and Brazil imported from Argentina, although the model was face-lifted in 2005 from Suzuki Grand Vitara. For the 2006 model year, the silver GM logo was added on the front doors. The Tracker was replaced in the summer of 2008 by the Saturn Vue in the U.S. and Canada (Chevrolet Captiva Sport in Mexico).

=== Philippines ===
In the Philippines, General Motors introduced the Tracker in late 1999, sold alongside the related Suzuki Grand Vitara. Imported from Canada, it was powered by Suzuki's 2.0 L J20A four-cylinder engine coupled to a 4-speed automatic transmission. Standard equipment included a leather wrapped steering wheel, power seats with lumbar support (driver side only), 4-speaker infotainment system with CD playback, rear seats, and central locking. Some were also equipped with spare tires at the back. Due to low sales, GM pulled the Tracker from the market in 2001.

=== Brazil ===
First-generation Geo Trackers made in Canada were never offered by GM officially. Still, private importers brought them to the country, even though Suzuki brought the Suzuki Vitara from Japan. Private importers also brought to the country soft-top and four-door Sidekicks made in Canada.

For the second generation, it became initially available in the country in 2001, with only a diesel engine and four-door body style. Suzuki also offered the Grand Vitara at the time, with more engine choices and also a two-door hardtop and the XL-7. As the dollar soared, Suzuki left the Brazilian market in 2003.

Even though the Tracker was discontinued in the U.S. and Canada, the Tracker continued sales in Mexico and Brazil, although the model received a facelift in 2005. For the 2006 model year, the silver GM logo was added on the front doors. The Tracker was finally replaced by the 4-cylinder versions of the already introduced Chevrolet Captiva Sport (Saturn Vue in the U.S. and Canada, even though the Vue and Captiva are both built in Mexico) in the summer of 2008.

== Safety report ==
According to a 1995 report by the Insurance Institute for Highway Safety, the 1991–1993 two-wheel drive Geo Tracker had 21 driver fatalities for 66,210 registered vehicles, the highest incidence reported, at 3.2 per 10,000 vehicles. The 4x4 version, however, reported 48 driver fatalities for 271,355 registered vehicles (1.8 per 10,000). The IIHS states that the small utility class had a total of 366 driver fatalities for 2,144,891 total registered vehicles (1.6 per 10,000). This study was widely criticized for faulty comparisons. For example, this study does not note the difference between two-door models and four-door models. A later IIHS study clearly shows that, while two-door Trackers have a slightly below-average injury rate, the four-door models are better than the average for utility vehicles.

== Rebadged Chevrolet Trax ==
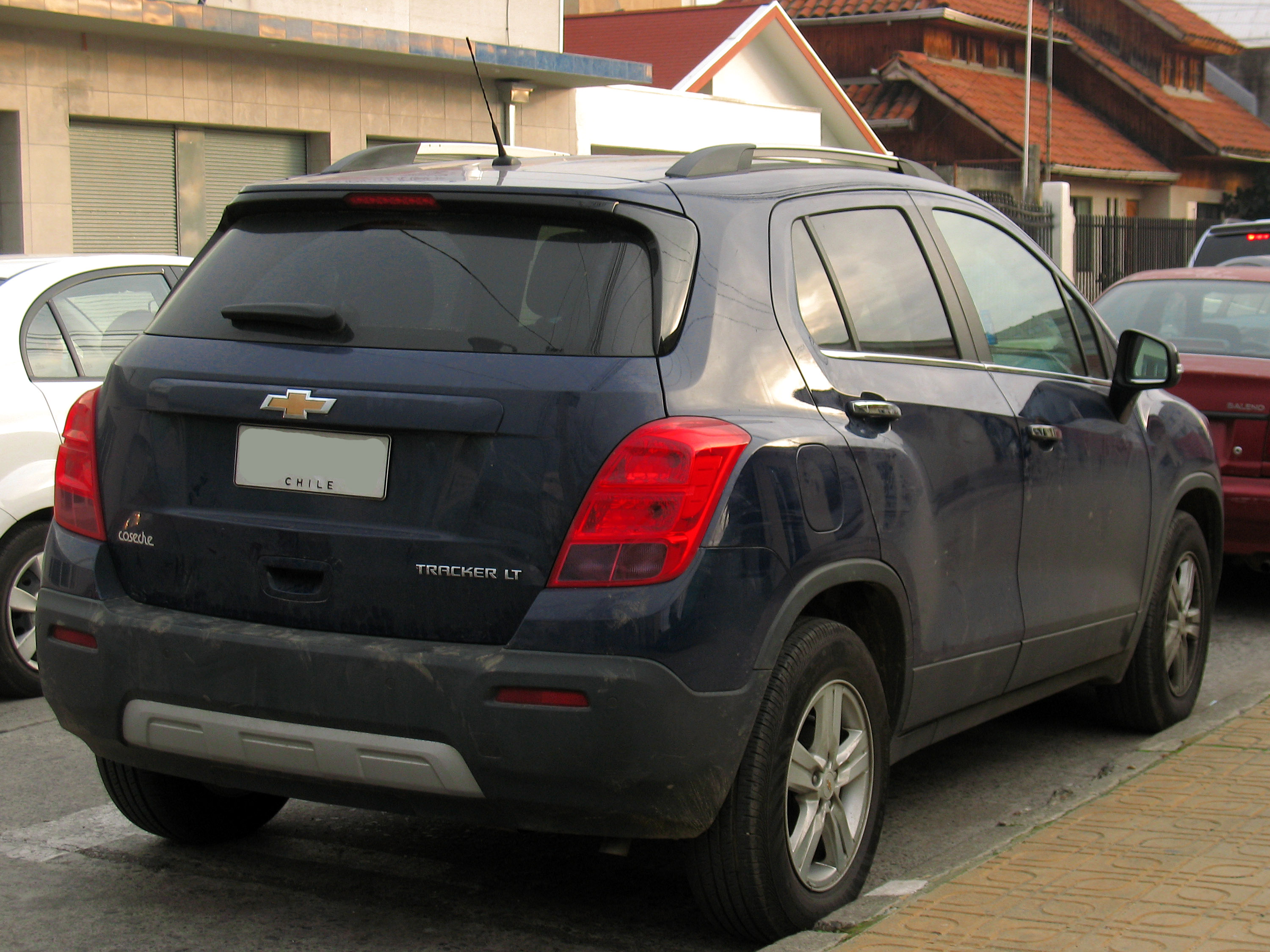
Chevrolet Tracker (Chile)

The Chevrolet Trax was sold in Russia and South America as the Tracker. In Russia, the name Trax would be too closely related to the word trakh (Rus. трах), which is a colloquialism for copulation.
