= Travis Katz =

Technology entrepreneur and investor

- Education: Stanford University; Wharton School of the University of Pennsylvania
- Occupation: Entrepreneur
- Known for: Founder and CEO, Trip.com
- Title: Vice President and General Manager, YouTube

Travis Katz is an American technology entrepreneur and investor. He is currently the General Manager of Shopping for YouTube. Katz served as the president and CEO of GM-backed electric vehicle maker BrightDrop, co-founded Fox Interactive Media, led the global expansion of social networking site MySpace, and was co-founder and CEO of online travel site Trip.com, which was acquired by CTrip in 2017.

== Early life and education ==
Travis Katz grew up in Englewood, Colorado. Katz attended Stanford University, where he graduated with a degree in Public Policy. He later attended the Wharton School of Business at the University of Pennsylvania, where he graduated with an MBA in 2001, earning deans' list honors.

== Career ==
=== World Bank ===
Katz started his career at the World Bank in Washington, D.C., where he focused his research on decentralization and urban development in Latin America. He co-authored a number of case studies with Tim Campbell on improving city governance and urban innovation in Latin America and the Caribbean, and co-organized the first ever Latin American Conference of Mayors, bringing together mayors of major cities from throughout the region to exchange learnings and best practices. From there, Katz joined a joint program of the World Bank and the United Nations Development Program focused on improving access to clean water and sanitation in the developing world. While there he co-authored with Jennifer Sara a widely cited report on how improve the sustainability of investments in rural water supply, based on field research Katz oversaw in Africa, Asia and Latin America.

=== Fox Interactive Media ===
Katz joined Fox Entertainment Group in 2003 to work on corporate and business development, including the launch of action sports network, FUEL. During this time, Katz was identified by CEO Rupert Murdoch as one of "four rising stars" asked by Murdoch to develop a strategy for how to use the web to distribute News Corp’s content to new audiences. Together with Ross Levinsohn, Adam Bain and Michael Kirby, Katz founded Fox Interactive Media, and was given a "war chest of $2 billion" to acquire digital businesses, including MySpace, Photobucket, Rotten Tomatoes, and IGN. Within a year of launching the business, Fox Interactive Media had overtaken Yahoo! to be the most visited property on the Internet.

=== MySpace ===
In February 2006, Katz joined social media company MySpace to lead the company's expansion outside of the United States. By January 2007, Katz had launched the MySpace business in 11 countries, and 25% of MySpace's 325,000 new sign ups were coming from outside the US. By 2008, Katz had launched MySpace in 29 countries, and had taken over international operations for other News Corp digital brands, including IGN and Rotten Tomatoes. Katz left MySpace in July 2009.

=== Trip.com ===
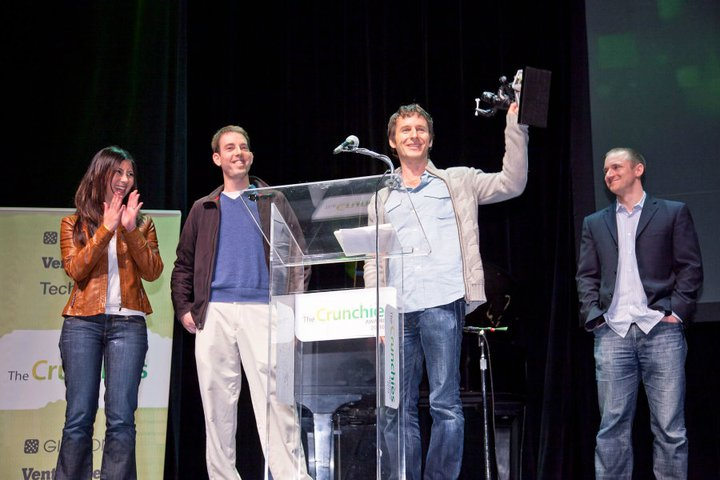
Travis Katz Accepting the Crunchies Award for Trip.com with Co-Founder Ori Zaltzman

In 2010, Katz launched an online travel company under the name Gogobot. The company was later rebranded Trip.com. Trip.com used artificial intelligence to provide travelers with real time recommendations based on their interests, location, weather and other signals. The site raised $39M over 3 rounds from Redpoint Ventures, HomeAway, Battery Ventures and Innovation Endeavors. In October 2017, Trip.com was acquired by Chinese travel company Ctrip and became that company's flagship brand outside of China. At the time of the acquisition, Ctrip reported the site had 60 million users. Following the acquisition, Katz worked as vice president of product for Skyscanner, a Ctrip company, where Trip.com's recommendations technology, as well as reviews and photos, were integrated.

=== BrightDrop ===
In 2020, Katz joined as founding CEO and President of BrightDrop, a new electric vehicle company, backed by General Motors, targeting commercial delivery. The vision was to combine the speed and agility of a Silicon Valley startup with GM's scale and strengths in manufacturing and supply chain. GM committed $800M up front to get the venture off the ground and build out the factory in Ingersol, Ontario.

Under Katz's leadership, the company delivered its first electric vehicles, the Zevo 600, to FedEx in December 2021, just twenty months from the vehicle's conception, making it the fastest vehicle to market in GM's history. BrightDrop secured contracts with FedEx, Walmart and Merchants Fleet, as well as an agreement to develop service vehicles for Verizon. In November, 2022, GM announced BrightDrop was on track to deliver $1 billion in revenue in 2023, making it one of the fastest companies in history to achieve this milestone.

In November, 2023, following a commitment by GM to cut $3B in expenses, the company announced it was bringing the independent BrightDrop unit in house, and would continue to manufacture the BrightDrop vans as part of Chevrolet's commercial portfolio.

=== YouTube ===
In 2024, Katz joined YouTube as the General Manager and Vice President for YouTube Shopping, where he oversaw significant expansion of the platform's e-commerce capabilities. Under his leadership, YouTube Shopping experienced significant growth, with its global gross merchandise volume (GMV) jumping 13-fold between the first quarter of 2024 and the first quarter of 2026. By 2026, the program had expanded to more than 35 countries and enrolled more than 1.3 million creators. Katz spearheaded major strategic partnerships to bolster the platform's retail network, most notably signing Amazon to the YouTube Shopping Affiliate Program in August 2026, complementing earlier integrations with major brands such as Walmart, Sephora, Nike, and Home Depot. During his tenure, Katz drove the incorporation of key artificial intelligence capabilities into the shopping experience, for example developing AI models that could automatically detect products in videos and suggest tags for creators to add.

== Personal life ==
Katz lives with his family in Menlo Park, California. He is an active traveler who has visited more than 54 countries. He met his wife on a camel safari in Jaisalmer, India.
