= CAMI Assembly =

General Motors Canada assembly plant

Coordinates: 43°01′01″N 80°53′15″W

- Operated: April 1, 1989; 37 years ago
- Location: 300 Ingersoll Street; Ingersoll, Ontario, Canada
- Industry: Automotive
- Products: Automobiles, BrightDrop Zevo 600
- Area: 1,700,000 square feet (157,900 m^{2})
- Owner: General Motors Canada
- Website: gmcamiassembly.ca
- Defunct: October 21, 2025; 13 months ago

CAMI Assembly (an initialism of its original name, Canadian Automotive Manufacturing Inc.) was an automotive assembly plant in Ingersoll, Ontario, Canada, owned and operated by General Motors Canada. CAMI occupied 570 acres (230 ha) and had 1,700,000 square feet (157,900 m^{2}) of floor space of which 400,000 square feet (37,161 m^{2}) was added in 2016, as part of a $560 million investment.

CAMI was established in 1989 as a joint venture with Suzuki, and has been wholly owned by GM since 2009. It uses the CAMI Production System (CPS), a set of operating philosophies that guide team members in manufacturing vehicles. The basis of the system was working in teams performing standardized work. This was based on the Japanese production system, which was built on a team concept. The plant shut down in 2025.

== History ==
CAMI was an independently incorporated joint venture of automobile manufacturing in Ingersoll, Ontario, Canada and formed the third step of General Motors' three-pronged initiative of the mid-1980s to capture and practice the Japanese mystique of automotive management. The other two were United Australian Automobile Industries between Toyota and Holden in Australia, and NUMMI in California with Toyota and GM, the latter a wholly owned alternative to apply its learnings into practice. CAMI was the least successful of the trio for decades, but is now the sole survivor.

Production began in late 1989 after several delays. To circumvent the American 25 percent "Chicken tax", the entire Canadian production of Geo Trackers was initially shipped to the United States. The Canadian market, not afflicted by a similar tariff, was supplied directly from Japan.

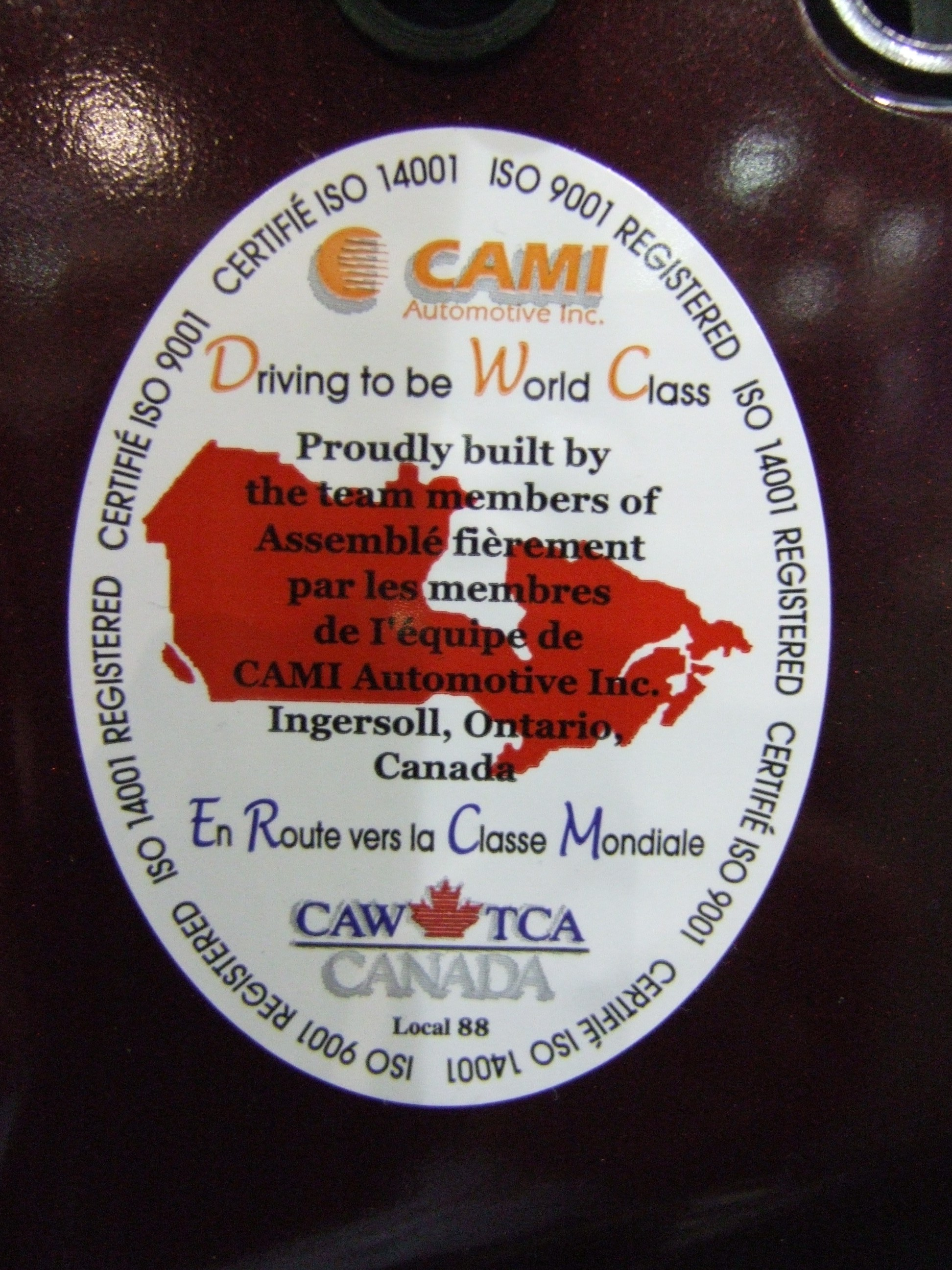
CAMI certification sticker on a Chevrolet Equinox, 2007

In November 2009, GM announced to invest US$85 million investment at the plant, raising production by 40,000 vehicles to 240,000 by adding a third shift, resulting in the recall of about 150 laid-off autoworkers in preparation of the 2010 Chevrolet Equinox and GMC Terrain. Until December 2009, ownership of CAMI was split 50-50% between Suzuki and General Motors of Canada Ltd. The former withdrew from the venture after it stopped production of its XL7 models at CAMI in June 2009 due to poor sales.

In December 2010, contrary to conditions set out by Canadian federal and Ontario provincial governments, GM laid off approximately 90 salaried staff as a result of its takeover of the CAMI Assembly plant.

From 2013 the plant has produced vehicles based on GM's Theta platform for crossover SUVs; production of the second generation Chevrolet Equinox for fleet sales continued even as production of the third generation model started on 8 January 2017. In 2013 GM announced a US$200 million (C$250 million) investment for a new body shop and flexible manufacturing equipment and tooling to support future production.

In early 2015, GM announced to invest US$450 million (C$560 million) in the plant in preparation for production of the next generation Chevrolet Equinox. The amount included C$190 million at the plant and C$370 million in vendor tooling with suppliers.

In January 2017, GM announced it would cut 625 workers as a result of shifting production of the second generation GMC Terrain to Mexico and phasing out the second generation Chevrolet Equinox earlier than planned. CAMI Automotive has 2,800 hourly and 300 salaried employees in early 2017 before the layoff. CAMI also supplied unfinished bodies of Chevrolet Equinox to GM's Oshawa Car Assembly for painting and final assembly. The arrangement ended after the production of the second generation Chevrolet Equinox ceased in 2017. In response to the Terrain's shifting and due to the production of the Equinox in two plants in Mexico, workers went on a strike, demanding CAMI become the main assembly point of the Equinox. The strike ended on October 16, 2017.

In 2021, GM announced CAMI Assembly would transition to the BrightDrop platform (starting in May 2022) to become General Motors Canada's first commercial EV manufacturing plant. Announced initial buyers include FedEx and Walmart. The plant began production of the BrightDrop Zevo 600 in December 2022, and the Zevo 400 in 2023.

The first BrightDrop vehicles were produced in early December 2022, with a grand opening event attended by various dignitaries. GM also announced package delivery service [FEDEX] as its first international EV customer. The plant shut down in October 2025 due to poor sales of the BrightDrop vehicles.

== Vehicles produced ==
=== Former ===
- Chevrolet BrightDrop 400 (2023–2025)
- Chevrolet BrightDrop 600 (2022–2025)
- Chevrolet Equinox (2004–2022)
- Chevrolet/Geo Metro (1989–2001)
- Chevrolet/Geo/GMC Tracker (1989–2004)
- GMC Terrain (2009–2017)
- Pontiac Firefly (1989–2001)
- Pontiac/Asüna Sunrunner (1989–1998)
- Pontiac Torrent (2006–2009)
- Suzuki Grand Vitara (1998–2005)
- Suzuki Sidekick (1989–1998)
- Suzuki Swift (1989–2001)
- Suzuki XL-7 (2006–2009)

== Historical timeline ==
- 1986 - CAMI Automotive established
- 1989 - Production of J1 (and Geo Tracker), M2 (Geo Metro) begins - 6,760 vehicles were built in calendar year 1989.
- 1990 - Suzuki Sidekick production added.
- 1993 - Total CAMI production reaches 500,000.
- 1994 - Production of M3 (Geo Metro and Pontiac Firefly) begins.
- 1996 - Total CAMI production reaches 1.5 million vehicles.
- 1998 - Production of J2 (Suzuki Vitara and Geo Tracker) begins and CAMI receives ISO 9002 registration for its Quality Management System.
- 2000 - CAMI receives ISO 14001 registration for its Environmental Management System.
- 2003 - Total CAMI production reaches 11.5 million vehicles.
- 2004 - Production of Chevrolet Equinox begins.
- 2005 - Production of Pontiac Torrent begins.
- 2006 - Production of Suzuki XL7 begins.
- 2009 - Production of Suzuki XL7 put on indefinite hold.
- 2009 - Production of GMC Terrain begins.
- 2009 - Suzuki withdraws from venture; gives General Motors full control.
- 2016 - Plant expansion
- 2017 - Production start of third generation Equinox; production of sister second generation Terrain moved to Mexico; in response of the Terrain's moving to Mexico, workers go on a strike demanding CAMI to become the main assembly point of the Equinox in order to prevent more shiftings to Mexico.
- 2022 - Production of the Chevrolet Equinox ends April 29, 2022.
- 2022 - Plant retools for BrightDrop production
- 2022 - Production of the BrightDrop Zevo 600 begins December 2022.
- 2023 - Production of the BrightDrop Zevo 400 begins.
- 2025 - Production of the Chevrolet BrightDrop ends October 21, 2025.

== Awards and highlights ==
- In the 2005 Harbour Report, CAMI was ranked No. 3 in truck assembly in the Small SUV category of the 45 auto assembly plants in North America.
- Recognized as the most efficient plant in North America four years in a row (2012, 2013, 2014, and 2015)
- J.D. Power Silver Plant Award for the Americas – June 2014
- Landfill Free status achieved in January 2014
- Clean50 - 'Leaders in Sustainability' Top 15 Project winner - September 2015
- Best GMNA Plant in Wiring Warranty Performance – February 2014

== See also ==
- United Australian Automobile Industries (UAAI) — A similar joint venture in Australia between Toyota and GM-Holden from 1989 to 1996.
- NUMMI — A similar joint venture in United States between Toyota and General Motors from 1984 to 2009; now a 100% Tesla Motors owned and operated plant.
