= BrightDrop =

Former electric commercial vehicle marque by General Motors

- Type: Subsidiary
- Industry: Automotive; Technology
- Founded: January 12, 2021; 5 years ago
- Defunct: 2024
- Fate: Merged into Chevrolet
- Key people: Travis Katz (President and CEO, January 2021 – December 2023)
- Products: BrightDrop Zevo
- Parent: General Motors
- Website: gmenvolve.com/brightdrop

BrightDrop was a subsidiary business created by the American manufacturer General Motors in 2021. The business offered a system of connected products targeting first- and last-mile delivery customers, including light commercial electric vehicles, ePallets, and cloud-based software.

Its first products, the BrightDrop Zevo delivery van and Trace electric cart, were unveiled at the Consumer Electronics Show in Las Vegas, Nevada on 12 January 2021. General Motors invested $800 million to produce the Zevo 600 in the CAMI Assembly manufacturing facility in Ingersoll, Ontario. In 2022, CEO Travis Katz shared as part of GM's Investor day that the company was on track to generate $1 billion in revenue in 2023.

In 2024, the BrightDrop division was merged into Chevrolet, with the Zevo being renamed the Chevrolet BrightDrop beginning with the 2025 model year.

== History ==
BrightDrop was one of the first successful businesses started in GM's Global Innovation incubator, headed at the time by engineer Pam Fletcher. Study of potential concepts for urban delivery began in September 2019 under the code name Smart Cargo. By February 2020, the Smart Cargo concept had evolved to include a potential electric delivery van and an electrically propelled container for delivery businesses. Later that year, GM appointed technology entrepreneur and investor Travis Katz to become president and CEO of BrightDrop. Previously, Katz had held executive roles at Redpoint Ventures, Skyscanner, and MySpace; he was also CEO and co-founder of Trip.com.

GM CEO Mary Barra introduced the BrightDrop brand as part of her address at the Consumer Electronics Show in January 2021. After the announcement, GM's stock reached its highest price since its initial public offering in 2010.

In 2021, FedEx was announced as the first commercial customer for BrightDrop vehicles, which placed an initial order for 500 Zevo 600 vehicles. Merchants Fleet, a fleet management company, is slated to purchase an additional 12,600 Zevo 600s starting in 2023.

BrightDrop changed the names of its entire lineup of products in April 2022. The EV600 was renamed to Zevo inclusive of two variants, the Zevo 600 and Zevo 400 (previously known as EV600 and EV410 respectively) and the BrightDrop Trace (previously known as EP1.)

In 2022, GM retooled the CAMI Assembly plant in Ingersoll, Canada to the BrightDrop platform, to become General Motors Canada's first commercial electric vehicle manufacturing plant. GM stated that it invested $2 billion converting the plant to a state of the art EV manufacturing facility. Canadian Prime Minister Justin Trudeau and Ontario Premier Doug Ford attended the opening of the plant in December, 2022.

In March 2023, BrightDrop shipped the first 500+ Zevo 600s built at the CAMI Assembly facility.

As of April 2023, BrightDrop had more than 30 commercial customers, including Walmart, Hertz, DHL Express, Purolator Inc., American Tire Distributors, WasteNot Compost and Rexel USA. Ryder plans to purchase 4,000 BrightDrop Zevo 600 and Zevo 400 electric vans for its lease and rental fleet through 2025, with the first 200 arriving in 2023.

On November 16, 2023, GM integrated BrightDrop more closely into GM's Envolve commercial business to provide fleet customers with an "efficient single point of contact." CEO Travis Katz stepped down from the CEO role.

== Products ==
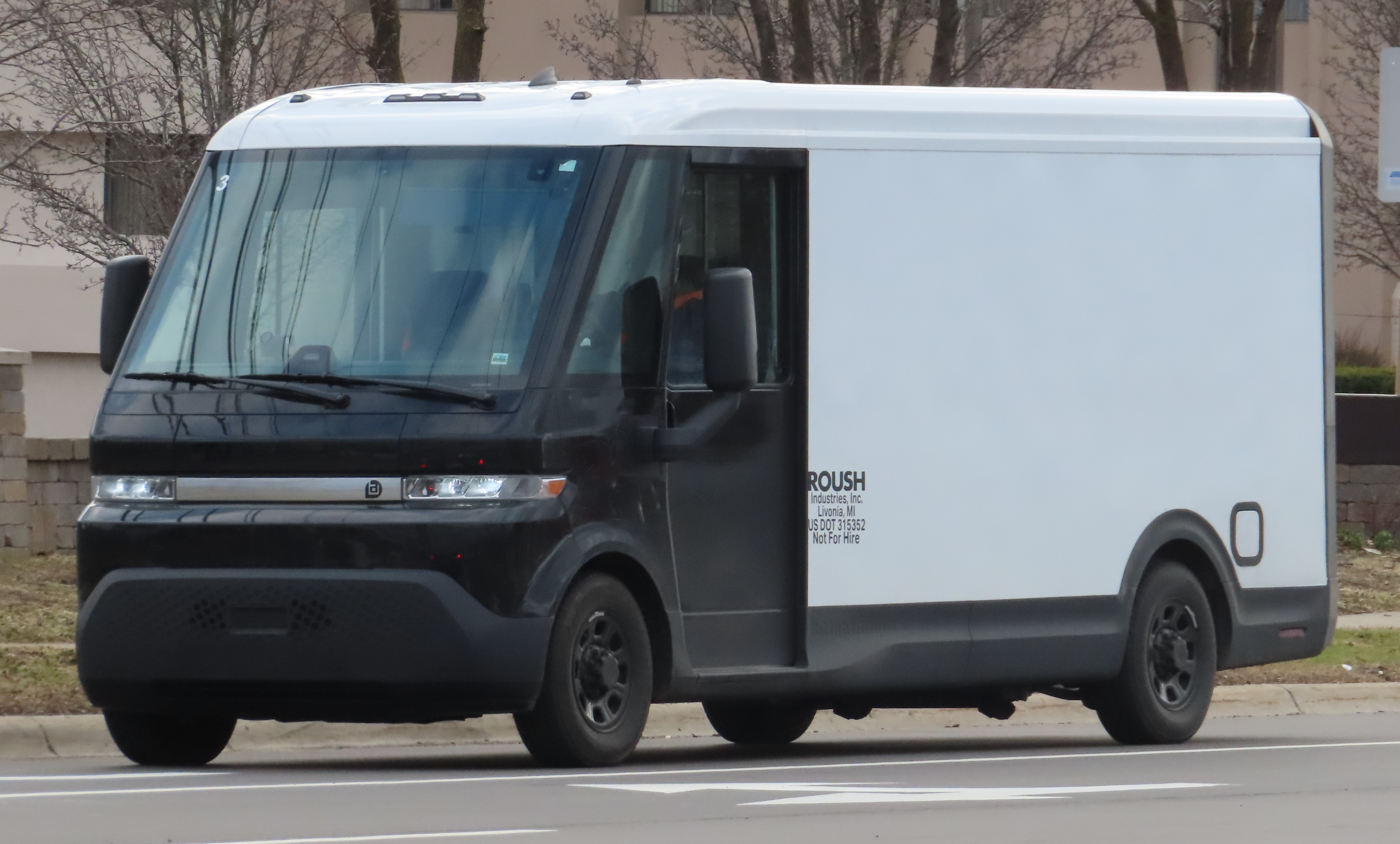
BrightDrop Zevo 600 all-electric delivery van

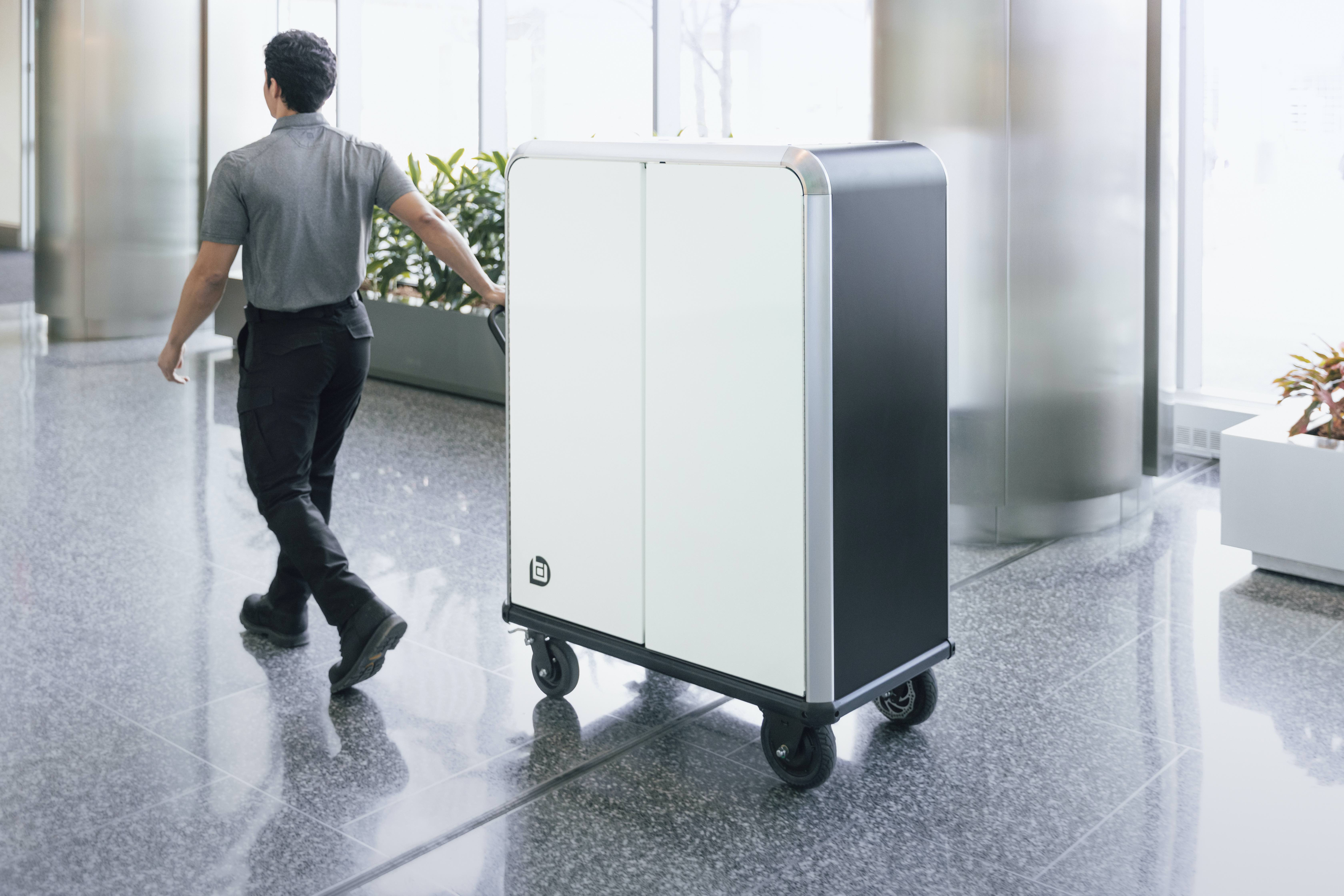
BrightDrop Trace electric delivery cart

BrightDrop's first two products are the Zevo 600 electric van and Trace electric pallet. The Zevo 600 is powered by GM's Ultium battery platform and is purpose-built for the delivery of goods and services over long distances. It has a built-in security system and a range of 250 miles per charge. Its name is a play on its 600 cubic feet of cargo space.

The BrightDrop Trace can carry up to 23 cubic feet and 200 pounds. It has a built-in electric motor to move at a speed of up to 3 miles per hour, adjusting to the walking speed of its operator. It helps delivery workers move goods over short distances, like from a van to a customer's front door. It has adjustable shelves and doors that can be remotely locked and unlocked. In a pilot program with FedEx, couriers were able to handle 25% more packages per day with the Trace and experienced less physical strain.

The company also has a cloud-based software platform accessible by web or mobile app. Its software can monitor vehicle locations and battery charges, manage vehicles remotely, predict maintenance needs, and optimize routes.

A smaller version of BrightDrop's van, called the Zevo 400, was built at the CAMI Assembly Plant in Ingersoll, Canada from 2023, with the first models going to the fleet of Verizon.

== Operations ==
BrightDrop developed electric vans, related hardware, support services and software for use by commercial delivery firms. It was part of a larger initiative at GM to have an all-electric lineup of vehicles by 2035.
