= Chevrolet BrightDrop =

Electric van produced by General Motors

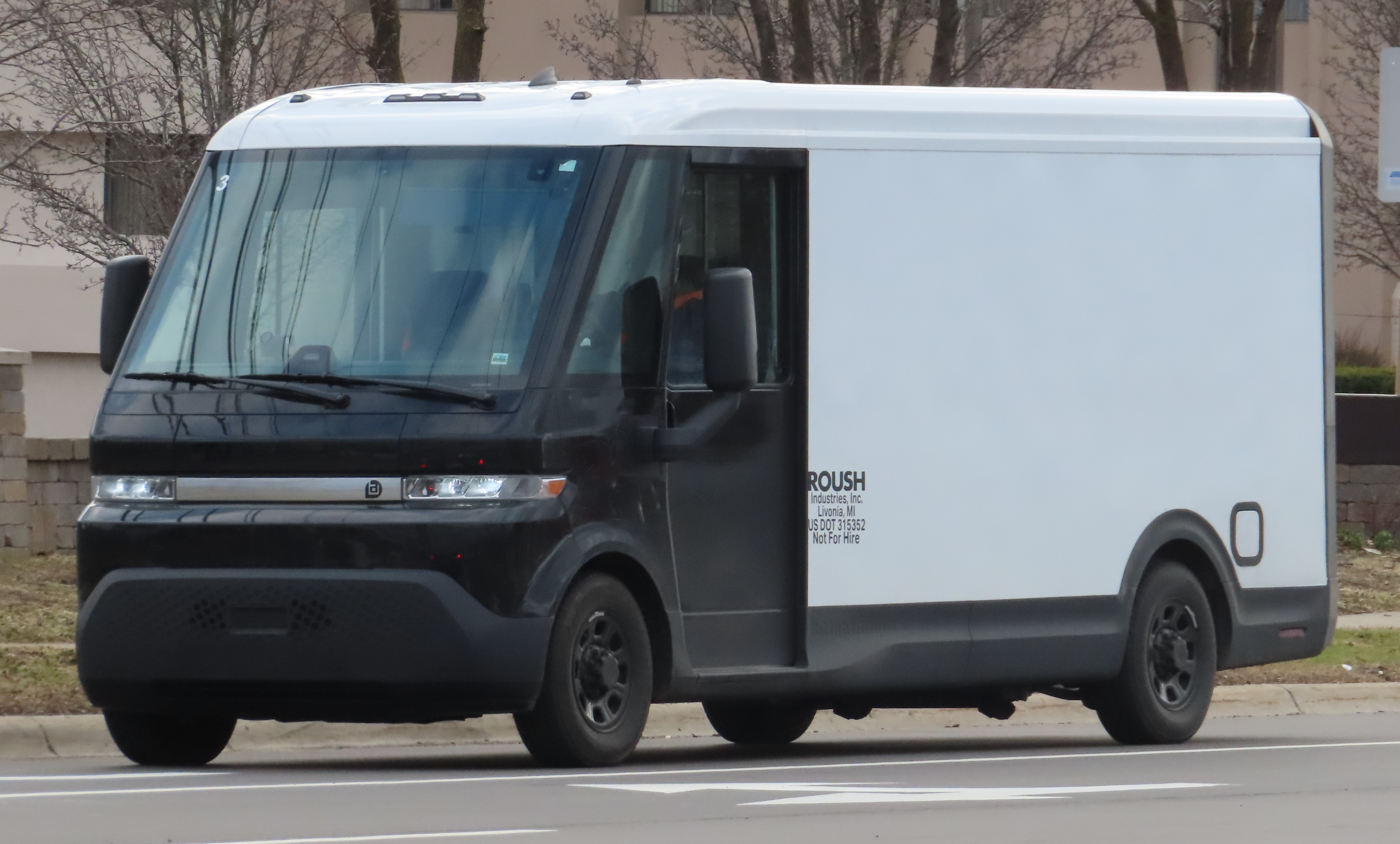
- 2022 BrightDrop Zevo 600

Overview
- Manufacturer: General Motors
- Also called: BrightDrop Zevo (2022–2024)
- Production: 2022–2025
- Assembly: Canada: Ingersoll, Ontario (CAMI Assembly)

Body and chassis
- Class: Medium duty truck
- Body style: Delivery van
- Layout: FWD & AWD
- Platform: General Motors BV1

Powertrain
- Electric motor: 1 or 2 Ultium Drive units
- Battery: 121 or 173 kWh
- Electric range: 160–270 mi (260–430 km)

Dimensions
- Length: 238–290 in (6,000–7,400 mm)
- Width: 106 in (2,700 mm)
- Height: 109 in (2,800 mm)
- Curb weight: 7,200–8,500 lb (3,300–3,900 kg)

The Chevrolet BrightDrop, formerly the BrightDrop Zevo, is a battery electric delivery van produced by General Motors (GM). It was unveiled at the Consumer Electronics Show on January 12, 2021, under the BrightDrop brand, with production beginning in December 2022. Since the 2025 model year, the van has been marketed under the Chevrolet brand and is available through select Chevrolet dealerships.

It comes in two models: the larger Chevrolet BrightDrop 600 (formerly the BrightDrop Zevo 600 and BrightDrop EV600), with approximately 600 cubic feet (17 m^{3}) of cargo volume, and the smaller Chevrolet BrightDrop 400 (formerly the BrightDrop Zevo 400 and BrightDrop EV410), with approximately 400 cubic feet (11 m^{3}) of cargo volume.

== History ==
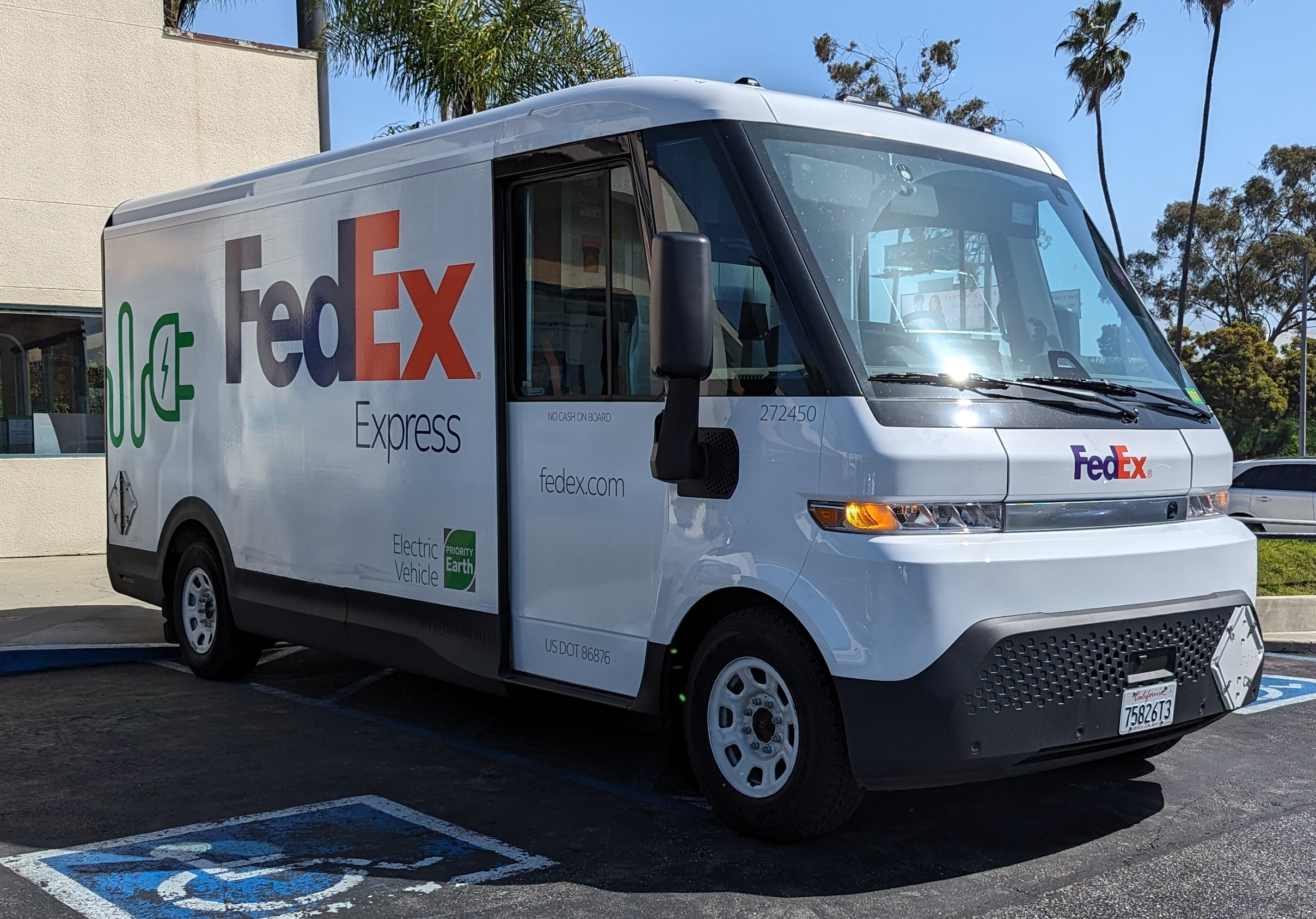
Brightdrop Zevo 600 operated by FedEx in Hawthorne, California (2024)

Rumors began circulating in June 2020 that GM was developing an all-electric delivery van, codenamed "BV1". Earlier reports from December 2019 indicated that an electric van would be built at Detroit/Hamtramck Assembly. At that time, contracts for 100,000 Rivian EDV electric delivery vans ordered by Amazon and 10,000 Arrival Vans ordered by UPS were collectively valued at US$4 billion.

The BrightDrop EV600 was unveiled as the brand's first vehicle at the Consumer Electronics Show in Las Vegas, Nevada, on January 12, 2021, alongside the EP1 electric pallet cart. GM announced that FedEx had ordered 500 EV600s. The smaller EV410 was first shown in September 2021; telecommunications company Verizon was the launch customer, with deliveries scheduled for 2023.

In April 2022, BrightDrop announced it had renamed its products; the EV600 and EV410 became the Zevo 600 and Zevo 400, respectively. The EP1 was renamed the Trace (e-cart spelled backward).

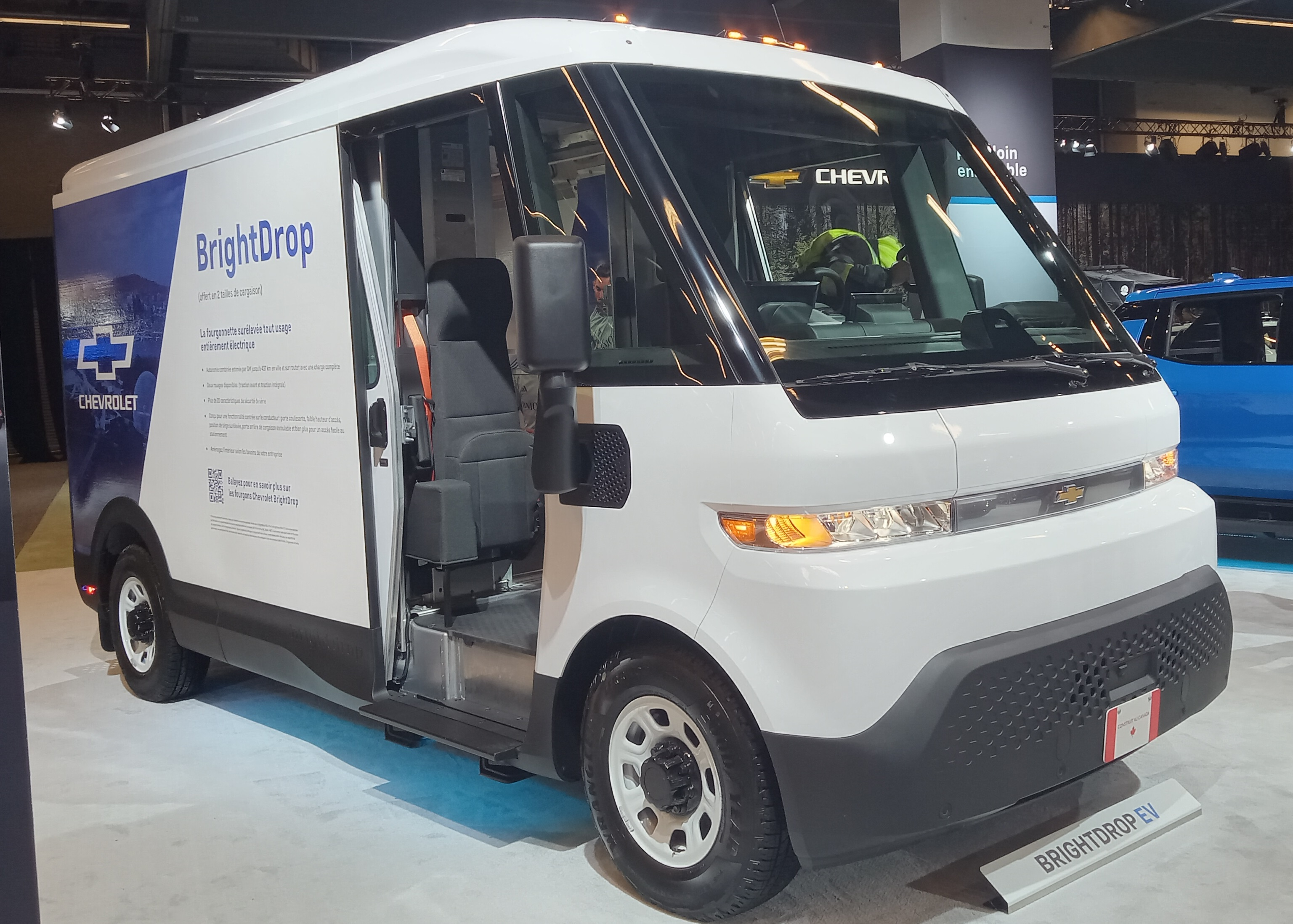
2025 Chevrolet BrightDrop 400 on the 2025 Montreal International Auto Show

GM partnered with KUKA, a supplier, to build the initial batch of vehicles in Michigan to meet the 2021 delivery target. GM shifted production to the CAMI Automotive factory in Ingersoll, Ontario, in November 2022. Some of the robots and tools used by KUKA were transferred to CAMI; CAMI staff used the initial batch to refine production processes. Zevo 600 production at CAMI began on December 5, 2022. At full capacity, CAMI is expected to build 50,000 vans per year. Production of the Zevo 400 was scheduled to begin in late 2023.

In addition to FedEx and Verizon, fleet management company Merchants Fleet placed an order for 18,000 EV600 and EV410 vans by November 2021. FedEx received the first five EV600 vans from its 500-vehicle order in December 2021, operating them out of its Inglewood, California facility. FedEx later increased its order by 2,000 units, and Walmart reserved 5,000 units in January 2022. Consumer sales were scheduled to commence in 2022. In September 2022, Hertz announced it would order up to 175,000 electric vehicles from GM, including an unspecified number of BrightDrop Zevo 600 vans. BrightDrop announced its first international order in December 2022, delivering vans to DHL Express Canada.

Orders for the Zevo 400 opened in August 2023 for the 2024 model year, alongside the introduction of a smaller 14-module battery as standard equipment for all Zevo models and interior design changes. In October 2023, production of all BrightDrop Zevo vans was paused for approximately six months due to Ultium battery supply issues, resuming in April 2024.

On January 11, 2024, GM recalled all 2022 model year BrightDrop EV600 vans. The recall affected 66 vehicles, approximately 5% of which were estimated to have a front-drive unit that could leak oil and pose a fire risk. The recall did not involve the high-voltage traction battery.

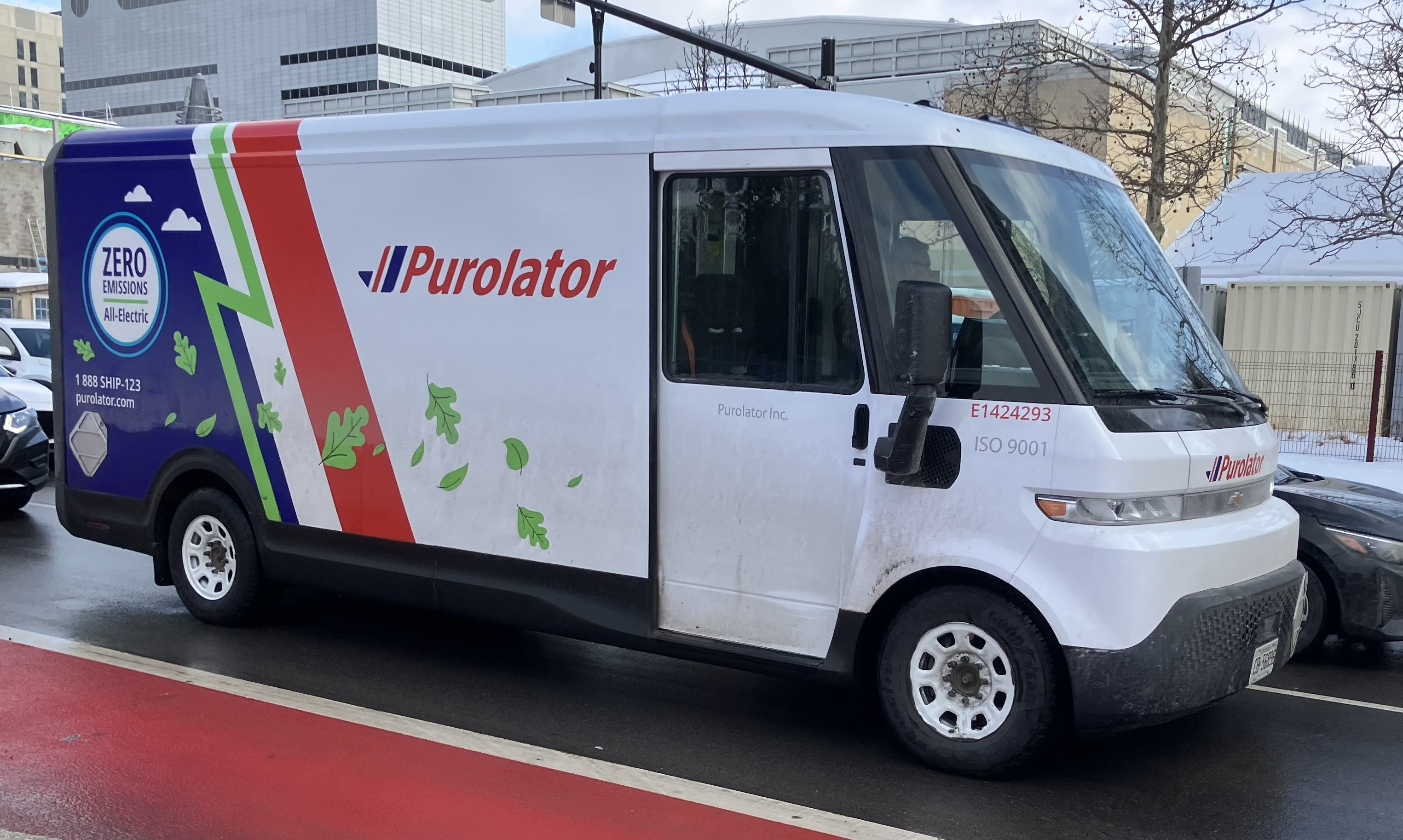
A Brightdrop Zevo 600 in Canada operated by Purolator

The replacements for the Chevrolet Express and GMC Savana were scheduled for the 2026 model year. They were anticipated to use Ultium battery technology and may have adopted a smaller version of the Zevo platform.

For the 2025 model year, the vehicles were rebranded from BrightDrop Zevo 400 and BrightDrop Zevo 600 to Chevrolet BrightDrop 400 and Chevrolet BrightDrop 600.

During GM’s Q3 2025 earnings call, CEO Mary Barra officially confirmed the decision to halt production of the BrightDrop van, citing low demand, changing regulations, and the loss of U.S. tax credits.

== Design ==
The BrightDrop range is based on the Ultium battery announced by GM in 2020. Because the van does not need a drive train axle, engineers were able to lower the step-in height by 2 inches (5.1 cm), improving ergonomics and reducing the physical strain on delivery drivers. The body is made of composite materials incorporating recycled content, riding on a typical battery-electric vehicle skateboard chassis with the underfloor traction motors and battery lowering the vehicle's center of gravity. The chassis uses high-strength steel in the rocker panels, door reinforcement beams, floor structure, and side pillars extending forward from the front firewall.

Specifications
Model Parameter			BrightDrop 400		BrightDrop 600	
Model Parameter			FWD	AWD	FWD	AWD
Dimensions (external)	Wheelbase		153.1 in (3,890 mm)		183.5 in (4,660 mm)	
Dimensions (external)	Length		238.61 in (6,061 mm)		290 in (7,366 mm)	
Dimensions (external)	Width (w/ mirrors)		106.2 in (2,697 mm)			
Dimensions (external)	Height (excl. antenna)		109.2 in (2,774 mm)		108.79 in (2,763 mm)	
Power	Horsepower		240 hp (243.3 PS; 179.0 kW)	300 hp (304.2 PS; 223.7 kW)	240 hp (243.3 PS; 179.0 kW)	300 hp (304.2 PS; 223.7 kW)
Power	Torque		300 lb⋅ft (406.7 N⋅m)	390 lb⋅ft (528.8 N⋅m)	300 lb⋅ft (406.7 N⋅m)	390 lb⋅ft (528.8 N⋅m)
Cargo (interior)	Length		117.51 in (2,985 mm)		168.9 in (4,290 mm)	
Cargo (interior)	Width (wall to wall)		83.68 in (2,125 mm)			
Cargo (interior)	Height (door open)		76 in (1,930 mm)			
Cargo (interior)	Volume		412.1 ft^{3} (11.67 m^{3})		614.7 ft^{3} (17.41 m^{3})	
Weight	Curb	EW2 Std	7,240 lb (3,280 kg)	7,470 lb (3,390 kg)	7,590 lb (3,440 kg)	7,820 lb (3,550 kg)
Weight	Curb	ETJ Max	—N/a	8,170 lb (3,710 kg)	—N/a	8,520 lb (3,860 kg)
Weight	Payload	EW2 Std	C5F: 2,510–2,690 lb (1,140–1,220 kg); C7E: 3,520–3,710 lb (1,600–1,680 kg)	C5F: 2,280–2,460 lb (1,030–1,120 kg); C7E: 3,290–3,480 lb (1,490–1,580 kg)	C5F: 2,190–2,340 lb (990–1,060 kg); C7E: 3,200–3,350 lb (1,450–1,520 kg)	C5F: 1,970–2,110 lb (890–960 kg); C7E: 2,980–3,130 lb (1,350–1,420 kg)
Weight	Payload	ETJ Max	—N/a	C5F: 1,560–1,770 lb (710–800 kg); C7E: 2,570–2,780 lb (1,170–1,260 kg)	—N/a	C5F: 1,250–1,420 lb (570–640 kg); C7E: 2,260–2,430 lb (1,030–1,100 kg)
Weight	GVWR	C5F	9,990 lb (4,530 kg)			
Weight	GVWR	C7E	11,000 lb (5,000 kg)			

=== Powertrain ===
The first vans were equipped with an all-wheel drive system using two traction motors, one each for the front and rear axles, and the combined output is 300 hp (220 kW) and 390 lb⋅ft (530 N⋅m). A front-wheel drive variant was introduced with the 2025 model year; single-motor peak output is 240 hp (180 kW) and 300 lb⋅ft (410 N⋅m). Deleting the rear traction motor reduces curb weight by 220–240 lb (100–109 kg).

The regular production option (RPO) ETJ "Max" high voltage traction battery in the BrightDrop uses 20 Ultium modules; for comparison, the GMC Hummer EV uses 24 Ultium modules and has an usable capacity of 212.7 kW-hr, and the Zevo "Max" battery has an estimated capacity of 173 kW-hr. The 20-module "Max" battery is available only with all-wheel drive. A smaller 14-module "Standard" battery, RPO EW2 is available for both front- and all-wheel drive models; the curb weight decreases by 520–700 lb (240–320 kg) with the "Standard" battery; estimated capacity of the "Standard" battery is 121 kW-hr.

The BrightDrop 600 is capable of recharging at rates of up to 120 kW (DC) or 11.5 kW (AC). A 19.2 kW (AC) charger is available as an option.

The combined (city + highway) estimated driving range is 159 and 272 mi (256 and 438 km) with the standard and max batteries, respectively; at launch, the range was estimated at 250 mi (400 km), which allows the vans to charge overnight for a full day of deliveries. Typical delivery routes average between 100 and 150 mi (160 and 240 km) per day, and the range was designed initially to ensure that delivery drivers could complete an entire route with confidence regardless of weather or traffic conditions. In addition, more gentle or partial charging cycles can be applied, which would prolong the life of the traction battery.

=== Cargo ===
The BrightDrop 600 has an advertised 600 cubic feet (17 m^{3}) of cargo volume and a GVWR of under 10,000 pounds (4,500 kg), providing an estimated payload rating of 2,200 lb (1,000 kg). The smaller BrightDrop 400 has 410 ft^{3} (12 m^{3}) of cargo volume, with a body approximately 20 ft (6.1 m) long, designed to fit in a standard parking space; the BrightDrop 400 rides on an approximately 150 in (3,800 mm) long wheelbase.

There are two rear axle options available; the standard, designated RPO C5F, carries a gross vehicle weight rating of 9,900 lb (4,500 kg), while RPO C7E uses an uprated rear axle to increase GVWR to 11,000 lb (5,000 kg), accommodating greater payload weight.

The BrightDrop 600 has a sliding curbside door that is 3 ft (0.91 m) wide to facilitate moving bulky packages, and the dashboard on that same curb side has a depression that can accommodate two standard United States Postal Service bins. The cargo area is separated from the driver's compartment with a sliding bulkhead door, and a translucent roof is available along with standard motion-activated LED lights to illuminate the rear, which will accommodate a standing person who is 6 ft 4 in (1.93 m) tall without stooping. When the exterior roll-up door is up, the rear opening measures 60.0 in (1,520 mm) wide and 72.0 in (1,830 mm) high.

=== Driver assistance ===
Advanced driver-assistance systems include pedestrian detection, automatic emergency braking, and a rear-view camera. For the driver's convenience, the vehicle has parking assistance and may be locked, unlocked, or started remotely; fleets can monitor battery state of charge and track vehicle locations remotely as well. The steering wheel and seat are equipped with haptic technology to warn the driver of potential hazards through vibration.

Current displays use Android Automotive OS, but the interface may be customized in the future. Electronic systems and accessories are operated from the low-voltage (12V) battery, which is carried at the driver's feet.

== Sales ==
Calendar year	U.S.
2022	146
2023	497
2024	1,529

== End of production ==
In October 2025, GM confirmed it was ending production of the BrightDrop citing lower than anticipated demand, bringing the line to an end. GM said the decision had nothing to do with tariffs or trade.
