= Suzuki XL-7 =

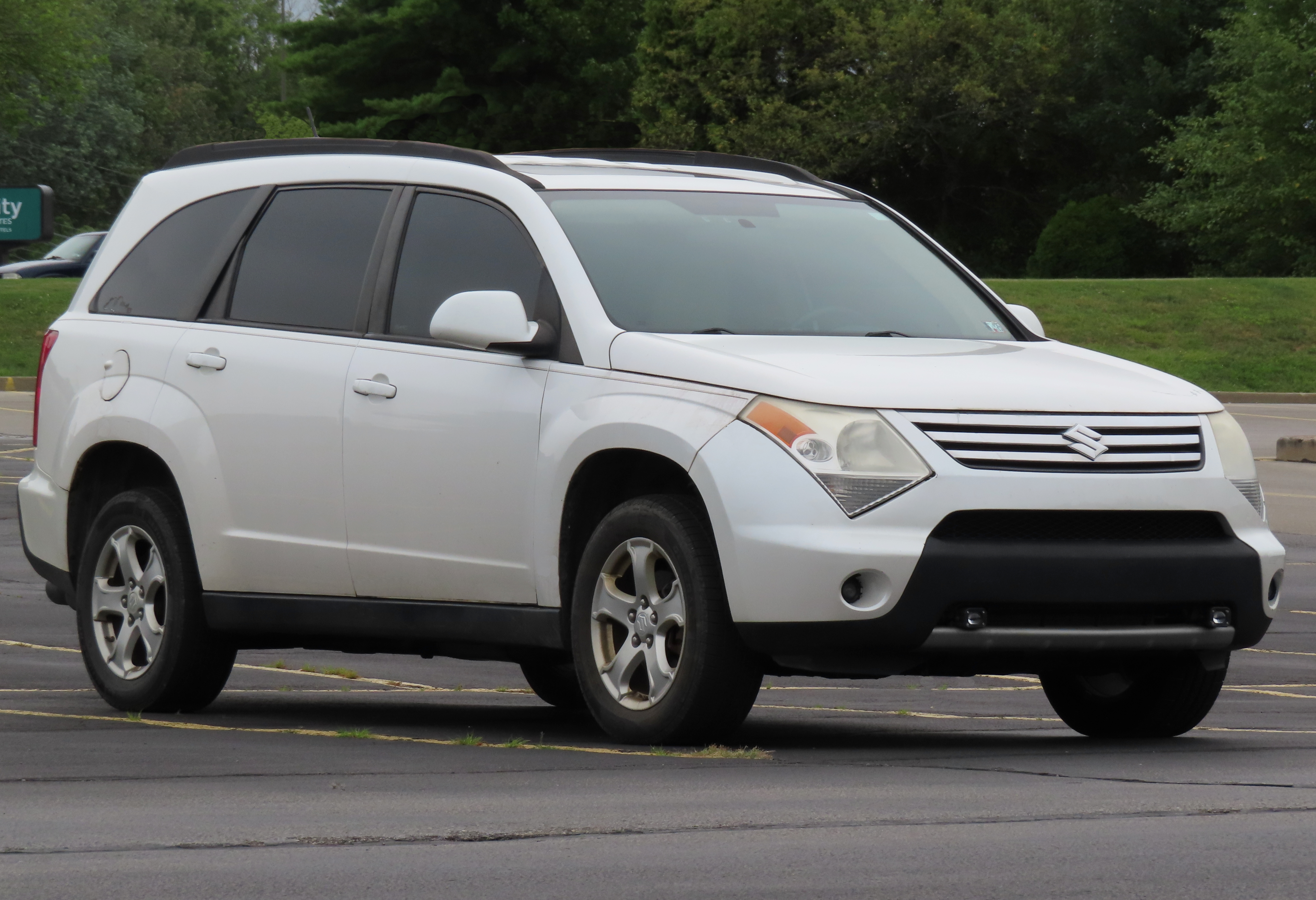

Overview
- Manufacturer: Suzuki (1998–2006); General Motors (2006–2009)
- Production: 1998–2009

Body and chassis
- Class: Full-size SUV (1998–2006); Mid-size crossover SUV (2006–2009)
- Body style: 5-door SUV
- Layout: Front-engine, rear-wheel-drive (1998–2006); Front-engine, front-wheel-drive (2006–2009); Front-engine, four-wheel-drive (1998–2009)

Chronology
- Successor: Chevrolet Captiva; Chevrolet Equinox (North America)

The Suzuki XL-7 (styled as XL7 for the second generation) is a mid-size SUV sold by Suzuki from 1998 to 2009, over two generations. Slotted above the Grand Vitara in Suzuki's lineup, the XL-7 offered three-row seating. XL-7 stands for "Xtra Large 7-seater".

== First generation (XL-7; 1998) ==
First generation
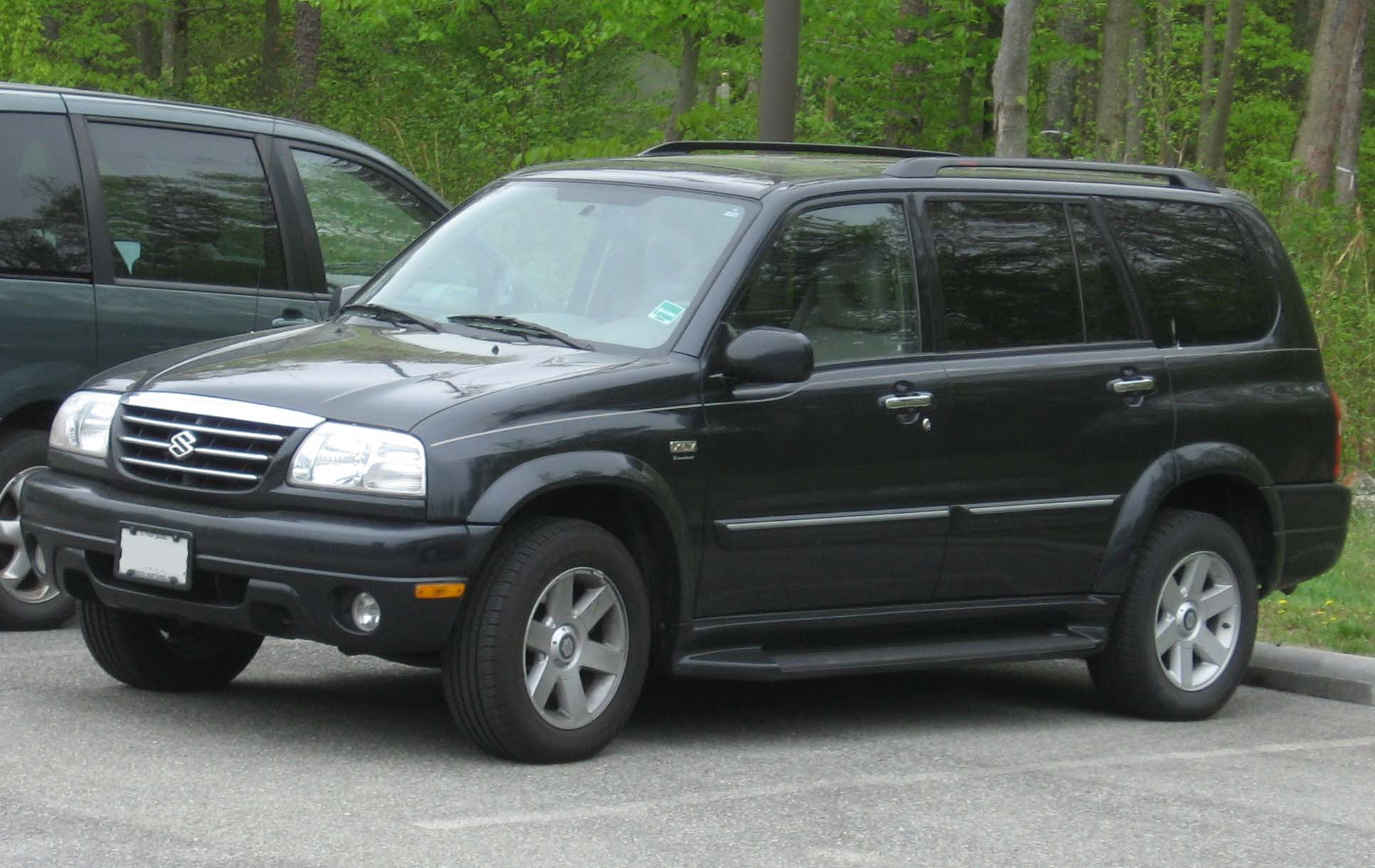

Overview
- Also called: Suzuki Grand Escudo (Japan); Suzuki Grand Vitara XL-7; Suzuki Grand Escudo XL-7 (Indonesia); Chevrolet Grand Vitara XL-7
- Production: 1998–2006
- Model years: 1999–2006
- Assembly: Japan: Iwata, Shizuoka (Iwata Plant); Indonesia: Bekasi (Suzuki Indonesia)

Body and chassis
- Class: Mid-size SUV
- Layout: Front engine, rear-wheel drive / four-wheel drive
- Related: Suzuki Escudo / Suzuki Vitara

Powertrain
- Engine: Gasoline: 2495 cc H25A V6; 2736 cc H27A V6; Diesel: 1997 cc DW10 common rail TD I4
- Transmission: 5-speed manual 4-speed automatic

Dimensions
- Wheelbase: 110.2 in (2,799 mm)
- Length: 187.4 in (4,760 mm) (2002–06); 183.6 in (4,663 mm) (1998-01)
- Width: 70.1 in (1,781 mm)
- Height: 68.0 in (1,727 mm); 67.5 in (1,714 mm)

The first-generation Grand Vitara XL-7 or just XL-7 was a Suzuki design, had a body-on-frame construction, and was essentially a stretched Grand Vitara. The North American version had a Suzuki-designed 2.5- or 2.7-liter V6 engine, on a rear-wheel drive-based platform with optional four-wheel drive. Beginning in 2003, European versions were also available with a 2.0-liter Peugeot turbodiesel engine producing 109 PS (80 kW).

A unique trait in the US market in this segment was that the XL-7 was available with a five-speed manual transmission, in both five- and seven-seat variants.

When introduced, the XL-7 was the least expensive SUV available with three-row seating in North America. It was awarded the Consumers Digest "Best Buy" award. However, sales slowed as the vehicle aged relative to the competition.

In Thailand, the Grand Vitara XL-7 was Imported by Siam International Corporation Co. Ltd. on 2002.

In Indonesia, the Grand Escudo XL-7 was launched on July 19, 2003, at the 12th Gaikindo Auto Expo.

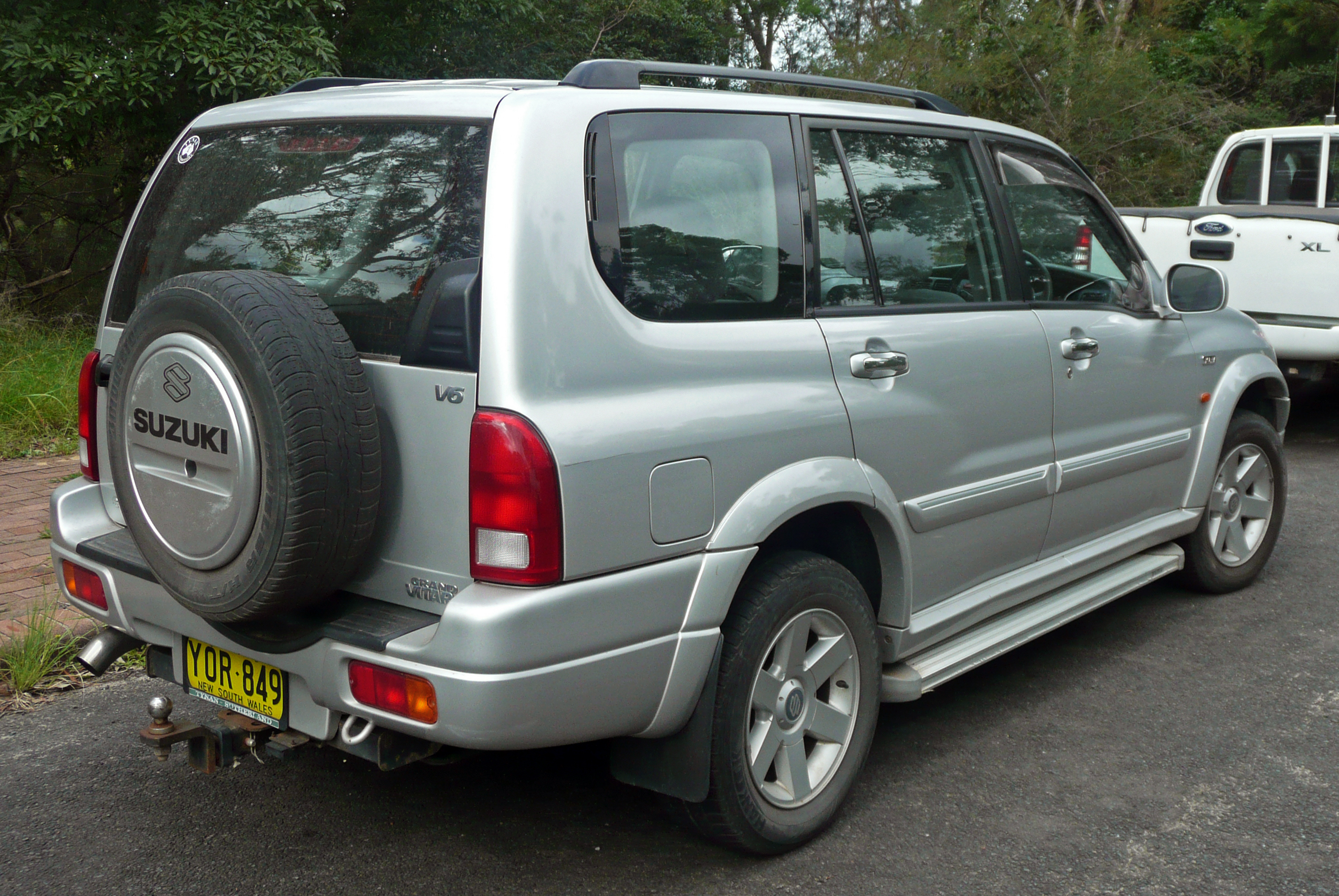
1999–2000 Suzuki Grand Vitara XL-7 (JA; pre-facelift, Australia)

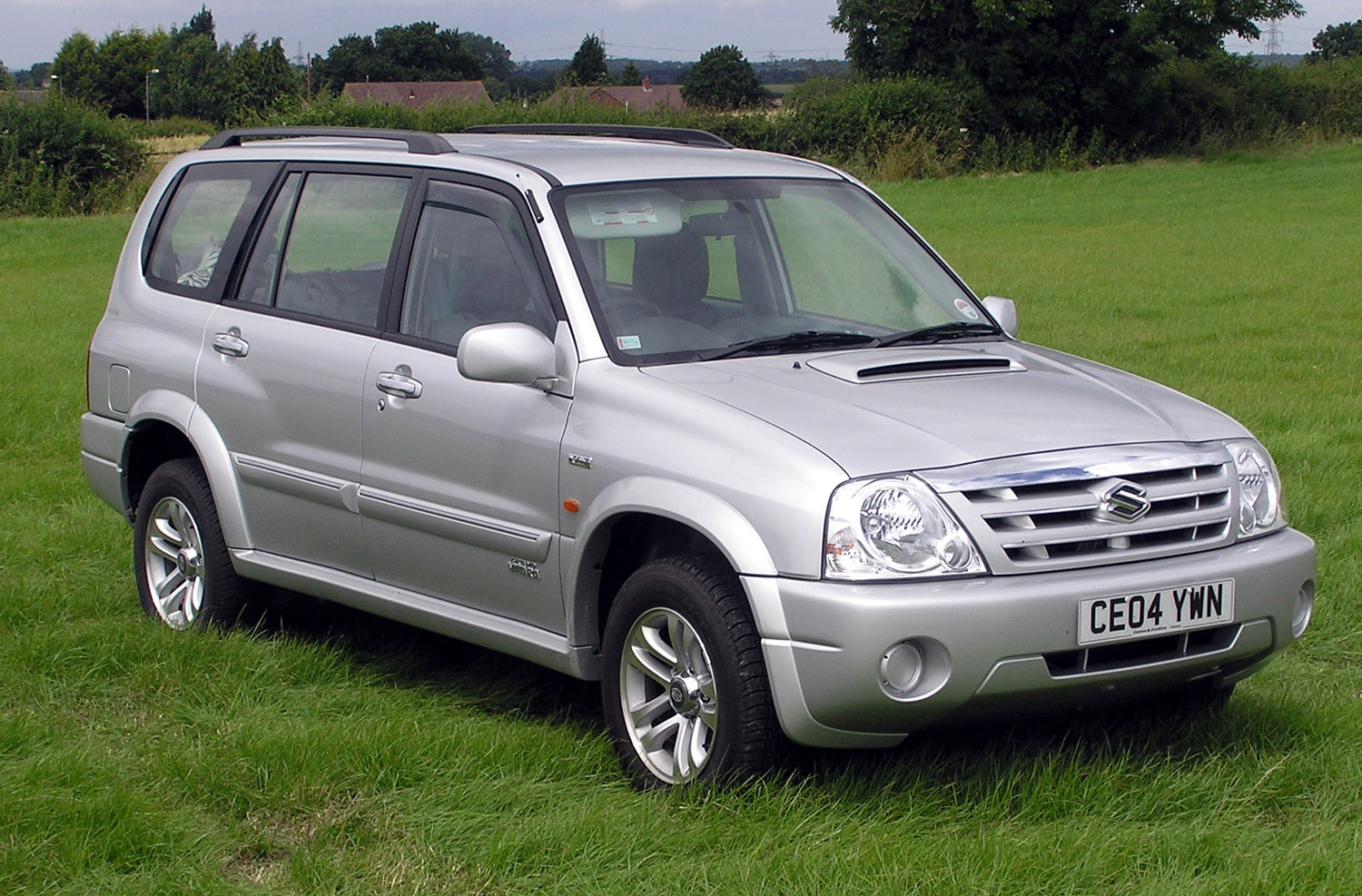
2004 Suzuki Grand Vitara XL-7 (facelift, UK)

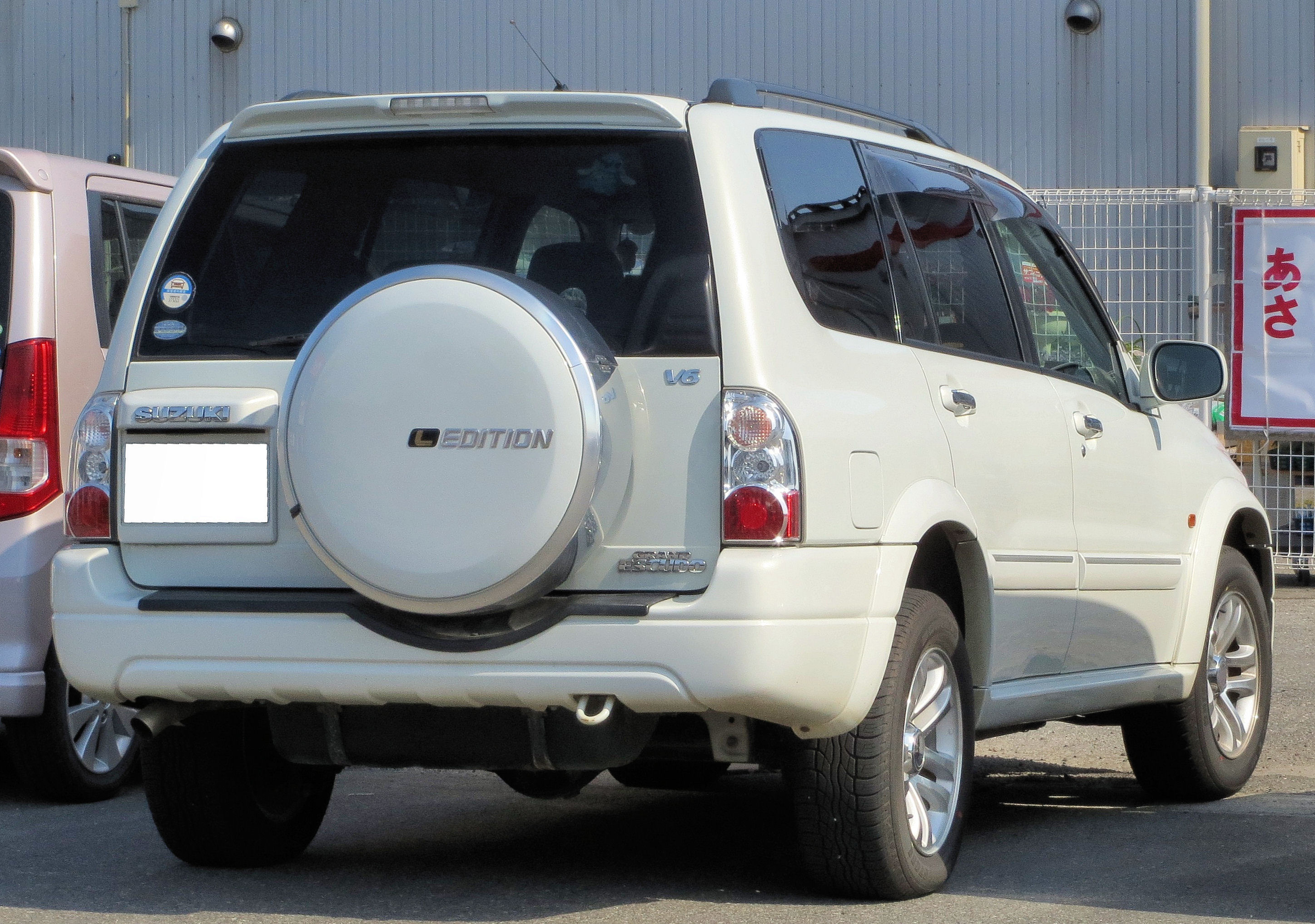
Suzuki Grand Escudo L-Edition (facelift, Japan)

== Second generation (XL7; 2006) ==
Second generation (Suzuki XL7)
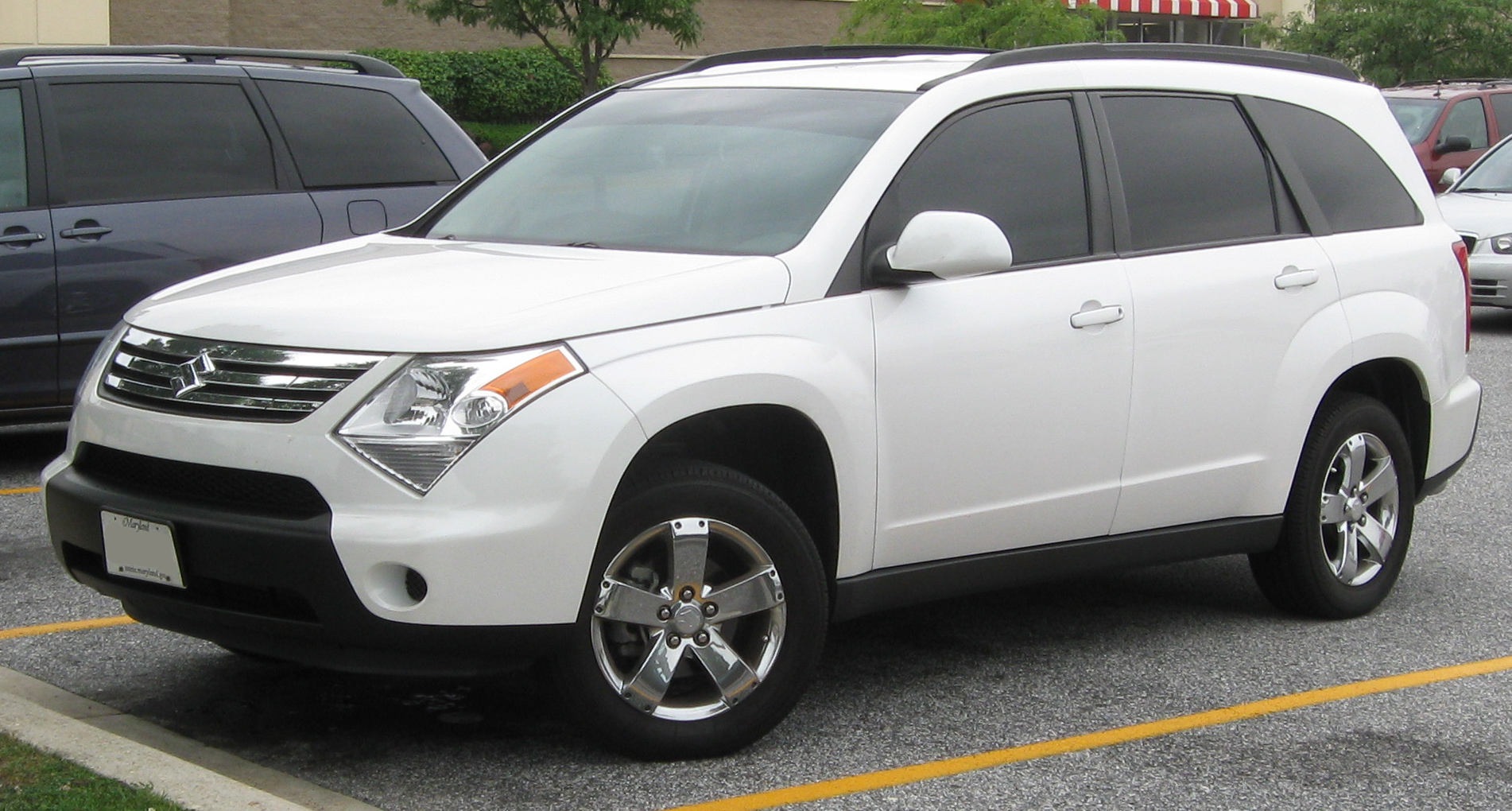

Overview
- Production: 2006–2009
- Model years: 2007–2009
- Assembly: Canada: Ingersoll, Ontario (CAMI)

Body and chassis
- Class: Mid-size crossover SUV
- Layout: Front-engine, front-wheel drive or all-wheel drive
- Platform: GM Theta platform/GMT193
- Related: Chevrolet Equinox; Pontiac Torrent; Saturn Vue

Powertrain
- Engine: 3.6 L N36A V6
- Transmission: 5-speed manual 5-speed automatic (2007-08); 6-speed automatic (2009)

Dimensions
- Wheelbase: 112.4 in (2,855 mm)
- Length: 197.2 in (5,009 mm)
- Width: 72.2 in (1,834 mm)
- Height: 68.9 in (1,750 mm)

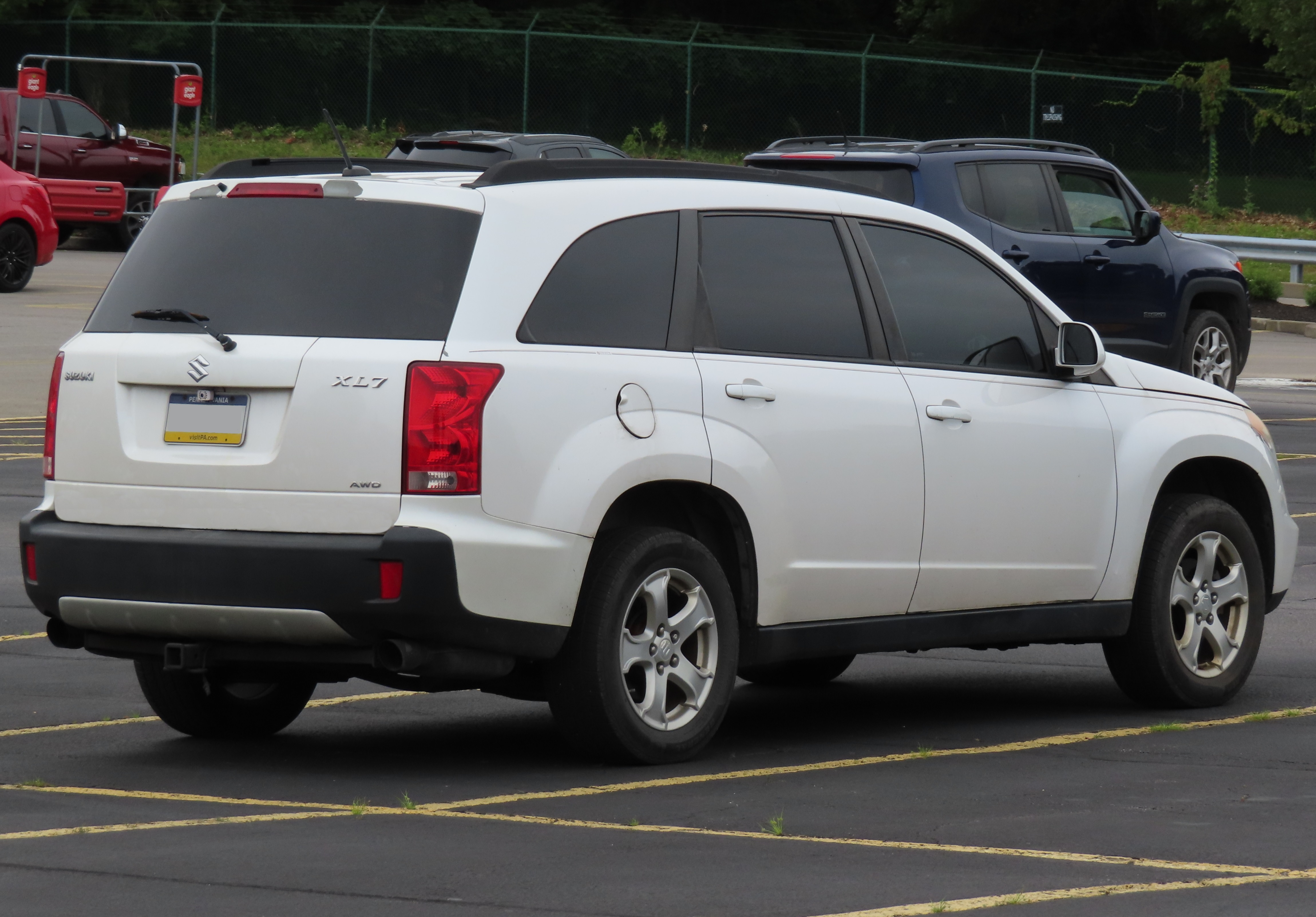
Rear view

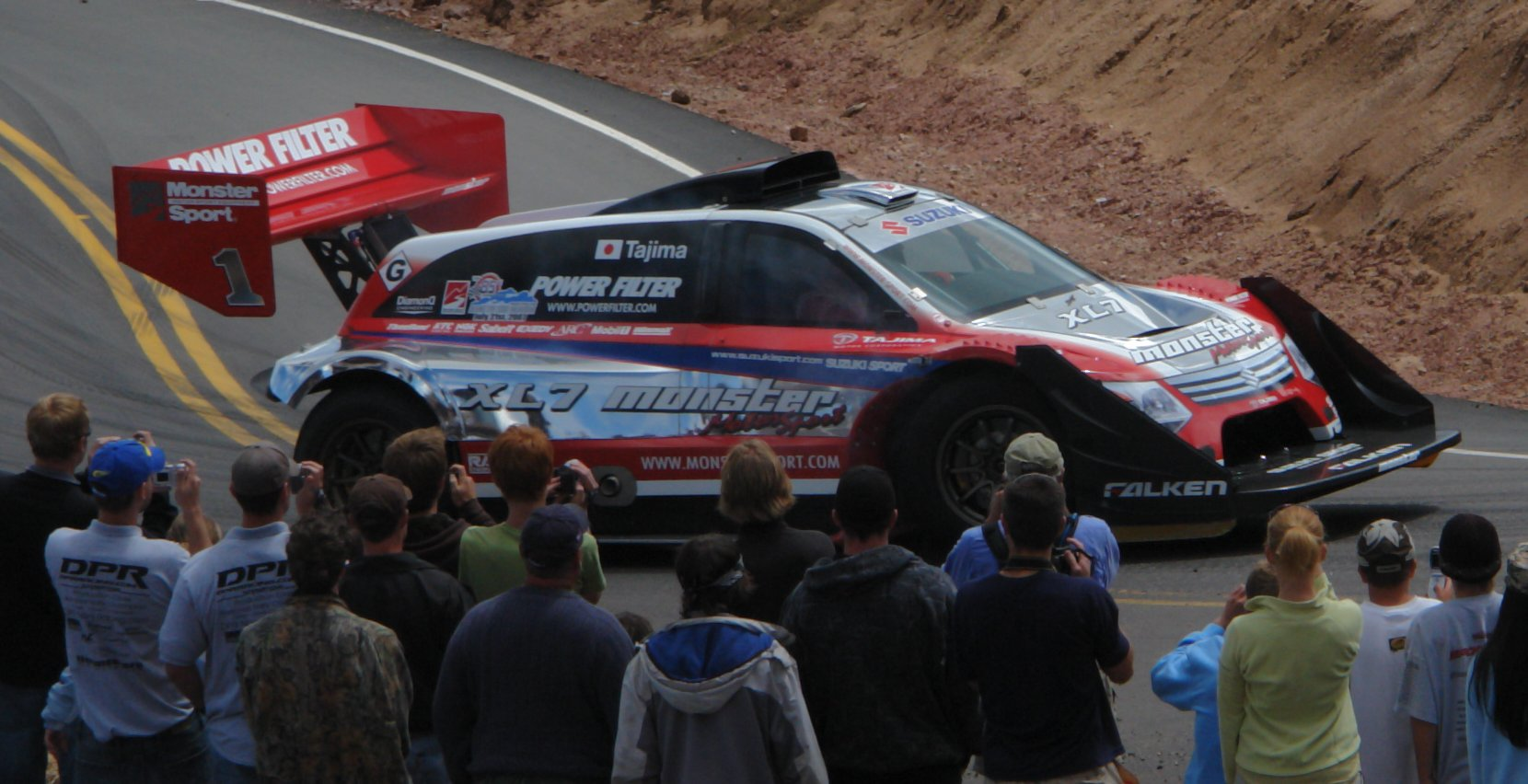
Suzuki XL7 of Nobuhiro Tajima at the 2007 Pikes Peak International Hill Climb during the record breaking run

Introduced on November 22, 2006, Suzuki partnered with General Motors to build the 2007 model year version, now called XL7 (without the hyphen). It used the same unibody platform and many of the same components as the Chevrolet Equinox, Pontiac Torrent, Saturn Vue and Opel Antara but incorporated third-row seating exclusive to the Suzuki. The second generation model used a version of the GM High Feature engine – designated N36A by Suzuki – built in Japan and shipped to CAMI Automotive in Ingersoll, Ontario, Canada, where the XL7 was assembled alongside the Equinox and Torrent. Styling cues on the 2007 model include a chrome slotted grille and trapezoidal headlights. It no longer has the spare tire mounted on the rear door.

From its introduction in 2007 until its discontinuation in 2009, the second-generation Suzuki XL7 was available in five trim levels: Base (2007-08 only), Special (2007 only), Premium (2008-2009 only), Luxury (2007-2009), and Limited (2007-2009). Depending upon the trim level selected, both two-row, five-passenger seating and XL7 specific three-row, seven-passenger seating were available (the related Chevrolet Equinox and Pontiac Torrent did not offer third-row seating as an option). All XL7s came decently equipped, and depending upon the trim level selected, could be equipped with options such as a premium audio system with a subwoofer and an amplifier, faux wood interior trim, luxury leather-trimmed seating surfaces with power-adjustable and heated dual front bucket seats, remote start, a security system, chrome-clad aluminum-alloy wheels, a power sunroof, a Bluetooth hands-free phone system (2009 models only), a single-disc, CD/MP3 player audio system, a six-disc, in-dash CD/MP3 changer audio system, a touchscreen GPS navigation system with SiriusXM Nav Traffic, SiriusXM Satellite Radio, and a rear backup camera system, among other options. Unlike the related Chevrolet Equinox and Pontiac Torrent, the General Motors (GM) OnStar in-vehicle telematics system was not available on the XL7.

All second-generation XL7s were powered by the General Motors (GM) High-Feature V6 producing 252 hp (188 kW) and 243 lb⋅ft (329 N⋅m) of torque. This was coded N36A by Suzuki. While 2007 and 2008 models used a five-speed automatic transmission, 2009 models received a new six-speed automatic transmission. Both Front Wheel Drive (FWD) and All Wheel Drive (AWD) models of the XL7 were available.

In May 2009, Suzuki halted production of the XL7 indefinitely due to low demand. Through May 10, 2009, CAMI Automotive had only produced four XL7s for Suzuki after producing more than 12,000 units the previous year. While no direct replacement to the three-row XL7 was available (General Motors offered the larger Buick Enclave, Chevrolet Traverse, and GMC Acadia midsize three-row crossover SUVs), the Chevrolet Equinox and GMC Terrain were considered the successors to the two-row XL7. The 2009 XL7 would be the final vehicle built by General Motors (GM) in partnership with Suzuki Motors.

== Markets ==
The second generation XL7 was also sold in Latin America, the Middle East, etc.

== Sales ==
Calendar year	United States
1998	591
1999	35
2000	3
2001	25,096
2002	27,295
2003	22,560
2004	18,501
2005	15,472
2006	10,948
2007	23,176
2008	22,554
2009	4,357
2010	313
2011	48
2012	10

== Other versions ==
The XL7 nameplate was revived in 2020 for a mechanically unrelated crossover-inspired derivative of the second-generation Ertiga multi-purpose vehicle (MPV).

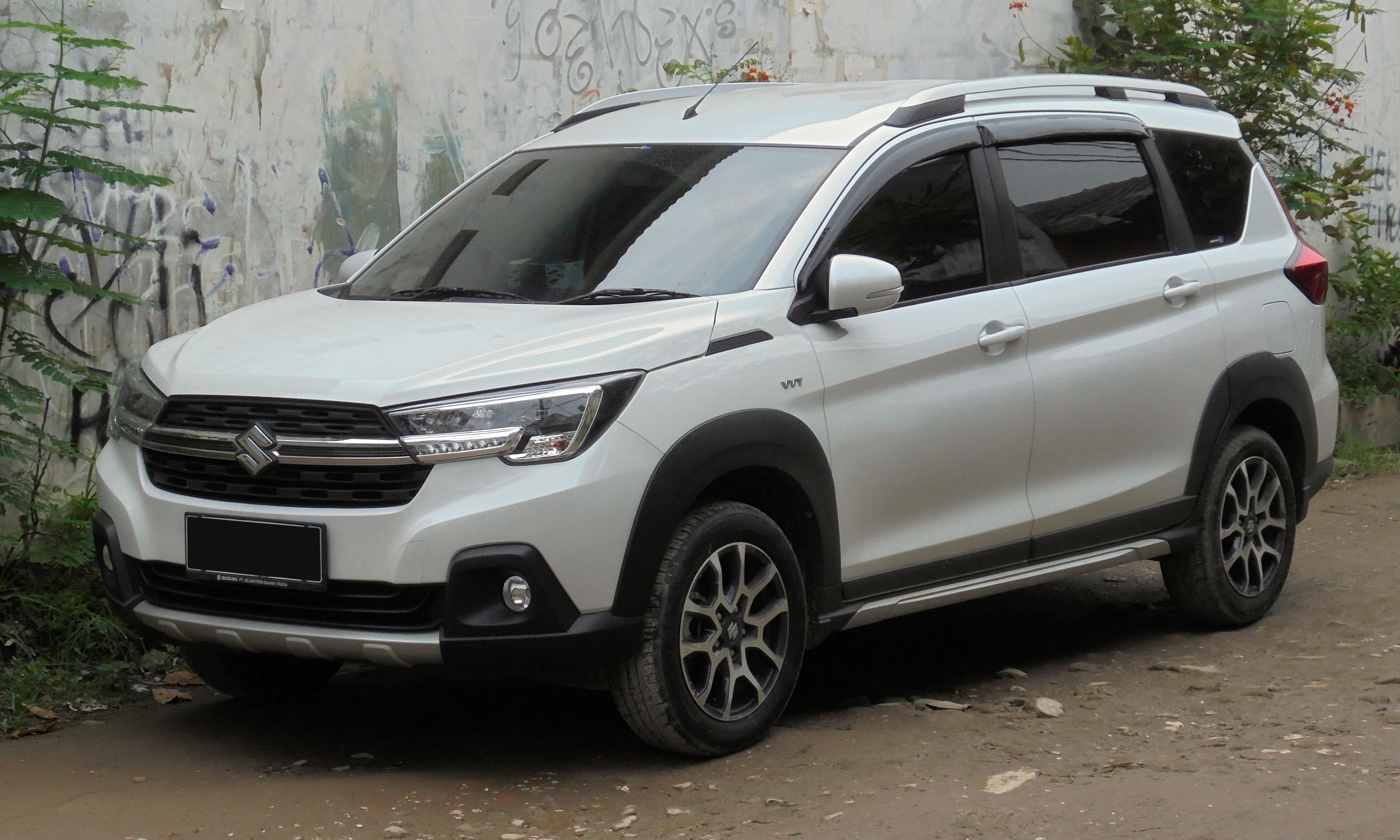
Ertiga-based XL7
