= Suzuki H engine =

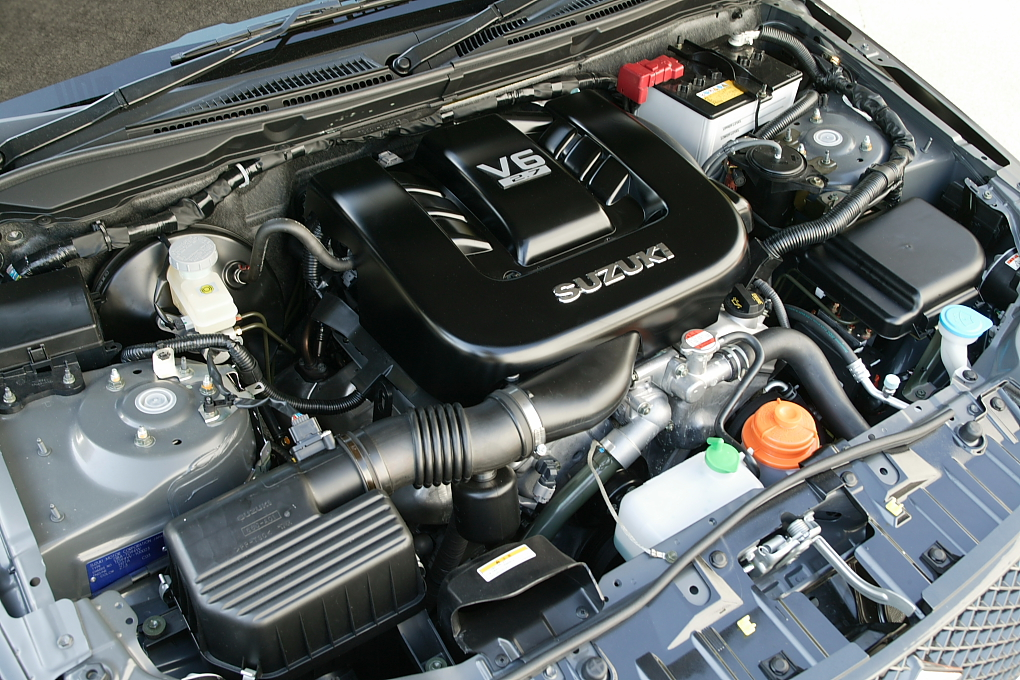

Overview
- Manufacturer: Suzuki
- Production: 1994-2009

Layout
- Configuration: Naturally aspirated 60° V6
- Displacement: 2.0 L (1,998 cc); 2.5 L (2,495 cc); 2.7 L (2,736 cc)
- Cylinder bore: 78 mm (3.07 in); 84 mm (3.31 in); 88 mm (3.46 in)
- Piston stroke: 69.7 mm (2.74 in); 75 mm (2.95 in)
- Cylinder block material: Aluminum
- Cylinder head material: Aluminum
- Valvetrain: DOHC 4 valves x cyl. with VVT (since 2006)
- Valvetrain drive system: Timing Chain
- Compression ratio: 9.5:1

Combustion
- Fuel system: Multi-Port Fuel Injection
- Fuel type: Gasoline
- Oil system: Wet sump
- Cooling system: Water-cooled

Output
- Power output: 107–138 kW (145–188 PS; 143–185 hp)
- Torque output: 172–250 N⋅m (127–184 lb⋅ft)

Chronology
- Successor: GM HFV6

The H family is a line of automobile 60° V6 engines from Suzuki. Ranging in displacement from 2.0 to 2.7 L (1,998 to 2,736 cc), the H family was a modern all-aluminum engine with dual overhead cams, 24 valves, and multi-port fuel injection. It was co-developed with Mazda and Toyota, which used a similar design in their 2.0 L KF V6 and the Toyota VZ engine. The H family was introduced in 1994 with the H20, but Suzuki, Toyota and Mazda's designs diverged greatly with the former increasing displacement and the latter experimenting with alternative induction technologies and smaller engine sizes. The four-cylinder J engine, which appeared in 1996, shared parts and design with the H family.

== H20A ==
The H20A displaces 2.0 L (1,998 cc); bore and stroke is 78 mm × 69.7 mm (3.07 in × 2.74 in). With a 9.5:1 compression ratio, it produces 107 kW (145 PS; 143 hp) at 6,500 rpm and 172 N⋅m (127 lb⋅ft) at 4,000 rpm.

Applications:

- 1994–1999 Suzuki Escudo/Vitara

== H25A ==
The H25A displaces 2.5 L (2,495 cc); bore and stroke is 84 mm × 75 mm (3.31 in × 2.95 in) and produced 106 kW (144 PS; 142 hp) when first introduced. With a 9.5:1 compression ratio, it produced 106 kW (144 PS; 142 hp) at 6,500 rpm and 203 N⋅m (150 lb⋅ft) at 3,500 rpm on its introduction, with a 2001 update increasing this to 116 kW (158 PS; 156 hp) and 213 N⋅m (157 lb⋅ft). It is also being considered and used for various ultra-light aircraft propulsion systems, like the Titan T-51 Mustang.

Applications:

- 1996–2005 Suzuki Escudo/Vitara Wagon/Estate (LWB) **not in Australia
- 1998–2005 Suzuki Grand Vitara (Only US and Canada)
- 2001–2004 Chevrolet Tracker
- 2003–2006 Suzuki Grand Escudo XL-7 (Indonesia Only)

== H27A ==
The H27A is a modern version of the H25A, displacing 2.7 L (2,736 cc), coming from an 88 mm × 75 mm (3.46 in × 2.95 in) bore and stroke (VVT added in 2006). The engine is tuned to achieve most of its torque at low revs at the expense of raw power at high revs, making the engine very responsive in day-to-day driving. It produces 138 kW (188 PS; 185 hp) at 6,000 rpm and 250 N⋅m (184 lb⋅ft) at 3,300 rpm.

Applications:

- 2000 - 2009 XL-7
- 2006 - 2008 Grand Vitara (North American and Taiwan markets)

== See also ==
- List of Suzuki engines
