= NRF Foundation =

US nonprofit organization

- Type: 501(c)(3) organization
- Website: nrffoundation.org

The NRF Foundation is a 501(c)(3) nonprofit and the philanthropic arm of the National Retail Federation.

== Leadership ==
In January 2023, Adam Lukoskie was named executive director of the NRF Foundation. He succeeds Bill Thorne, NRF's SVP of communications and Public Affairs, who previously served as executive director of the NRF Foundation from March 2020 – January 2023.

Ellen Davis was named president of the NRF Foundation in 2018. She joined the NRF in 2002 as manager of media relations and held several positions within the communications and public affairs department before becoming executive director of the Foundation in 2012. She then left NRF for CBA in January 2020.

Macy's Inc President and Bloomingdale's Chairman and CEO Tony Spring is the chairman of the NRF Foundation Board of Directors. Spring succeeds Macy's Inc. Chairman and CEO Jeff Gennette and Neiman Marcus President and CEO Karen Katz in the role.

== NRF Foundation Honors ==
Since 2015, the NRF Foundation Honors celebrates the retail professionals who are sparking innovation and inspiring change through its Visionary award, List of People Shaping Retail’s Future and RISE Up Partner of the Year. The eighth annual NRF Foundation Honors gala drew more than 700 attendees and raised nearly $3 million for the foundation’s career development programs and student scholarships.

== NRF Foundation New York: Student Program 2024 ==
Each year leading up to Retail's Big Show, the NRF Foundation hosts its Student Program for hundreds of students in New York City. This program exposes students to career paths in retail through talks from retail CEOs, networking and mentoring opportunities.

== RISE Up ==
In 2017, the NRF Foundation brought together dozens of retailers and nonprofits to launch the RISE Up (Retail Industry Skills and Education) training and credential program, designed to help people acquire the skills they need to land jobs in retail and advance into careers. More than 37,650 RISE Up credentials were earned in 2022.
