= Felony Lane Gang =

Organized crime group targeting bank drive-thrus

The Felony Lane Gang is an organized crime gang that has been based in Fort Lauderdale, Florida, in the United States.

== Name ==
The "Felony Lane" part of the name comes from the gang's frequent use of the lane that is furthest from surveillance cameras in drive-through banks.

== Crimes and tactics ==
The gang has been known to recruit drug addicts and others in "hopeless" situations to commit smash and grab theft from parked cars with the intent of stealing identification and then using it to quickly cash fraudulent checks, often while disguised as the identity theft victim. They target mothers at locations like daycares, fitness centers and outdoor recreation areas. The gang is known to operate nationwide in the United States. Thieves are often paid with drugs from their bosses, and have been known to remove or obscure the license plates on their cars in order to evade detection by surveillance cameras and eyewitnesses.

== Leadership ==
Travis J. Russ was sentenced to 188 months in prison in 2014 for leading the gang.
