= Vehicle ramming =

Vehicle ramming may refer to:

- Aerial ramming, the ramming of one aircraft with another
- Naval ram, a weapon fitted to varied types of ships that drives into the hull of an enemy ship to puncture, sink, or disable it
- Ram-raiding, a type of burglary in which a heavy vehicle is driven into the windows or doors of a building to allow the perpetrators to loot it
- Vehicle-ramming attack, an assault in which a perpetrator deliberately rams a vehicle into a building, people, or another vehicle
