= Ram Raid Offending and Related Measures Amendment Bill =

Proposed Act of Parliament in New Zealand

New Zealand Parliament

Legislative history
- Introduced by: Ginny Andersen
- First reading: 29 August 2023
- Status: Halted

The Ram Raid Offending and Related Measures Amendment Bill is a proposed New Zealand Act of Parliament that would add ram raids and other "smash and grab" offenses to the Crimes Act 1961 and give Police the power to prosecute juvenile ram raiders including 12 and 13-year olds. On 4 February 2025, the legislation was halted by the Sixth National Government in favour of proposed legislation targeting youth offenders.

== Provisions ==
The Bill amends the Crimes Act 1961, the Criminal Investigations (Bodily Samples) Act 1995, the Oranga Tamariki Act 1989 and the Sentencing Act 2002 to make ram-raiding a specific offense and to strengthen legal penalties against ram raiders.

- Inserts a new section 231B into the Crimes Act 1961 to criminalise ram-raiding.
- Amends the Criminal Investigations (Bodily Samples) Act 1995 to allow bodily samples to be collected from 12 and 13 year old offenders facing ram-raiding charges in the Youth Court.
- Amends the Oranga Tamariki Act 1989 to allow 12 and 13-years olds to be processed in the Youth Court on ram-raiding charges.
- The Bill also makes livestreaming ram raids, posting a copy of a livestream online or digitally distributing a copy of the livestream a corresponding factor in sentencing youth offenders under the Sentencing Act 2002.
- Amends the Sentencing Act 2002 to target adults who encourage or help a child or young person commit a ram raid, and offenders who produce and disseminate livestreams of ram raids.

== History ==
=== Background ===
Ram raiding saw a significant increase in New Zealand during the 2020s. In July 2022, Radio New Zealand reported a 400% increase in ram raids between 2017 and 2022; with 76% of those arrested being under the age of 18 years and 14% having connections to organised crime. Key driving factors included the influence of social media, dysfunctional family backgrounds, lack of role models, and poverty. Most vehicles used in ram-raids are used ex-Japan models such as the Mazda Demio, Mazda Atenza, Nissan Tiida and Toyota Aqua; these cars are easy to steal due to Japan's low crime rate and therefore low uptake of anti-theft measures such as immobilisers. The New Zealand Police took enforcement action against 37% of the ram raids; with 61% of offenders being prosecuted and another 39% being referred to youth agencies. In 2022 alone, police recorded 516 ram raids and apprehended 708 offenders; with 495 being under 17 years, 70 under 13 years, and 88 being adults.

In response to ram raids, the Labour Government allocated NZ$6,000,000 for the Police's Small Retailer Crime Prevention Fund in late August 2022. The fund allows stores to purchase protective equipment such as shatterproof glass, bollards, fog cannons, and roller doors to counter ram raids. By March 2023, over NZ$2,000,000 had been spent from the fund. Police Commissioner Andrew Coster expressed concern about police difficulty with prosecuting juvenile offenders. Prime Minister Jacinda Ardern stated that the Government preferred alternatives to incarcerating youths in order to reduce reoffending. By contrast, opposition ACT party leader David Seymour has advocated fitting youth offenders with ankle bracelets to counter ram-raids and robberies. Similarly, the opposition National Party leader Christopher Luxon has advocated sending young ram-raiders and other serious youth offenders to military-style boot camps.

=== First reading ===
On 29 August 2023, the Ram Raid Offending Bill passed its first reading. Its sponsor Justice Minister Ginny Andersen argued the Bill would address the recent rise in ram raiding, "smash and grab" crimes, and youth crime by giving Police and courts greater powers to prosecute these crimes and deal with 12 and 13 year old youth offenders. The National and ACT parties supported the Bill, with Paul Goldsmith, Mark Mitchell, Chris Baillie and Simon O'Connor describing the bill as an overdue mechanism needed to address retail crime and youth offending. By contrast, the Bill was opposed by the Green Party and Te Pāti Māori. Green MP Golriz Ghahraman argued a tough on crime approach towards retail crime and youth offending would not work and objected to taking bodily samples from 12 and 13 year old suspects. Māori Party co-leader Debbie Ngarewa-Packer disagreed with taking a punitive approach to youth crime and advocated focusing on addressing poverty and mental health issues among offenders.

That same day, Attorney General David Parker expressed concerns that the Ram Raid Offending bill breached the New Zealand Bill of Rights Act 1990 on three grounds: the right of a child to be dealt with in an age appropriate way, the right to be free from unreasonable search and seizure, and the right to freedom of expression.

=== Select committee ===
During a Justice select committee hearing on 12 March 2024 Pride Project members Aaron Tyree and Eryka Kiri, Voyce national spokesperson Tupua Urlich, YouthLaw general manager Darryn Atchison and New Zealand Law Society representatives Dale Lloyd and Professor Jermey Finn criticised the proposed Bill, which they described as punitive and failed to address the causes of crime including poverty and dysfunctional families. Lloyd said the proposed legislation breached internarional conventions on children's rights while Finn criticised the vague wording on those liable for ram raid offenses.

=== Responses ===
In early June 2024, several community leaders including doctors, youth advocates and lawyers organised a petition opposing the Ram Raid Bill. They also sent an open letter calling for the Government to stop work on the legislation, arguing that a punitive response would hurt marginalised and impoverished children and young people. Notable individuals and groups supporting the petition and open letter included Kick Back founder and youth worker Aaron Hendry and People Against Prisons Aotearoa spokesperson and criminology lecturer Emmy Rakete.

=== Termination ===
On 5 February 2025, Justice Minister Paul Goldsmith and Minister for Children Karen Chhour confirmed that the Sixth National Government would discontinue the ram raid legislation in favour of new legislation targeting youth offenders. The Sixth National Government has confirmed plans to introduce a "Youth Serious Offender declaration" allowing courts to send serious youth offenders to military-style academies.
