= Ram-raiding =

Burglary using a vehicle to ram a building

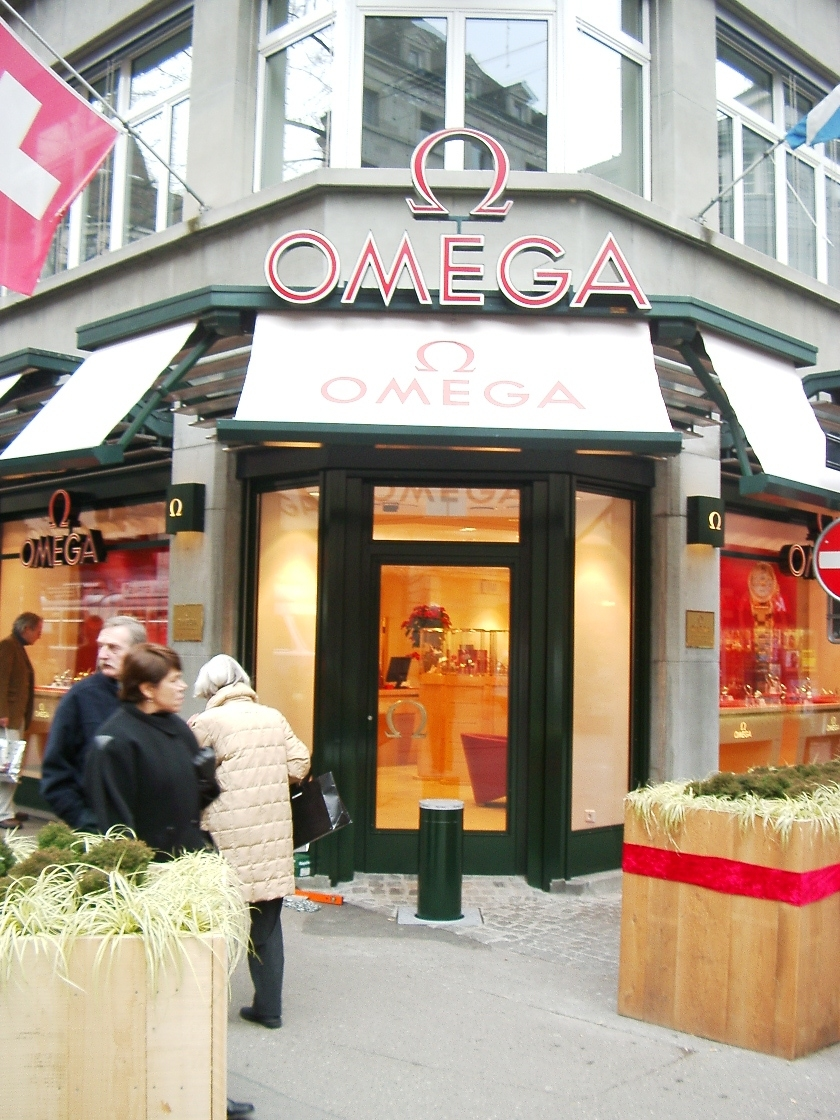
A bollard in front of a shop to deter ram-raiders

Ram-raiding is a type of burglary in which a heavy vehicle is driven into the windows or doors of a building, usually a department store or jeweller's shop, to allow the perpetrators to loot it.

== Etymology ==
The Oxford English Dictionary notes that the earliest known usage of the compound noun ram raid dates from 1987. It first appeared in the Evening Chronicle, a Newcastle upon Tyne newspaper. The noun ram-raider also comes from the same newspaper, also in 1987. That dictionary also notes that the term ram-raiding was used as a noun by PR Newswire in 1990, while the term ram-raid was used as a verb by the Independent newspaper of London in 1991. The Merriam-Webster Dictionary notes that the term ram-raiding is a noun of British origin. The Collins English Dictionary notes the term can be spelt using a space, as in ram raid, or using a hyphen, as in ram-raid and indicates these terms can be used as both nouns and verbs. It also describes ram-raiding as a present participle of ram-raid. Also it notes that the plural form is ram-raids or ram raids, while derived forms of ram-raider or ram raider, ram-raiding or ram raiding also exist as nouns.

=== Definition ===
Whichever term is used, the act involves using a vehicle to break into and gain entry into premises, or attempt to do so, usually to steal the contents. In most jurisdictions the act is considered a type of burglary, or robbery, as few jurisdictions have defined the act as a specific criminal offence.

== Overview ==
The term came into widespread use after a series of such raids in Belfast, Northern Ireland, in 1979 that was covered in news reports and in countries such as Australia and New Zealand that inspired a series of similar crimes. During these raids, large trucks are used to break into technology companies and steal high-value equipment for resale on the black market.

Commercial properties in areas prone to ram-raids often erect barriers or obstructions, such as bollards, to discourage such attacks. Automated teller machines are also targets of ram-raiding, with criminals smashing the machines to steal cash boxes.

Many companies have come up with solutions to ram-raiding. Everything from electronic bollards to electronic barriers has been employed to keep property from the raiders.

Another solution is security guards, but round-the-clock teams are expensive and often not the most economical way of dealing with ram-raiding.

== In New Zealand ==
Ram raiding saw a significant increase in New Zealand during the 2020s. In July 2022, Radio New Zealand reported a 400% increase in ram raids between 2017 and 2022; with 76% of those arrested being under the age of 18 years and 14% having connections to organised crime. Key driving factors included the influence of social media, dysfunctional family backgrounds, lack of role models, and poverty. Most vehicles used in ram-raids are used ex-Japan models such as the Mazda Demio, Mazda Atenza, Nissan Tiida and Toyota Aqua; these cars are easy to steal due to Japan's low crime rate and therefore low uptake of anti-theft measures such as immobilisers. The New Zealand Police took enforcement action against 37% of the ram raids; with 61% of offenders being prosecuted and another 39% being referred to youth agencies. In 2022 alone, police recorded 516 ram raids and apprehended 708 offenders; with 495 being under 17 years, 70 under 13 years, and 88 being adults.

In response to ram raids, the Government allocated NZ$6,000,000 for the Police's Small Retailer Crime Prevention Fund in late August 2022. The fund allows stores to purchase protective equipment such as shatterproof glass, bollards, fog cannons, and roller doors to counter ram raids. By March 2023, over NZ$2,000,000 had been spent from the fund. Police Commissioner Andrew Coster expressed concern about police difficulty with prosecuting juvenile offenders. Prime Minister Jacinda Ardern stated that the Labour Government preferred alternatives to incarcerating youths in order to reduce reoffending. By contrast, opposition ACT party leader David Seymour has advocated fitting youth offenders with ankle bracelets to counter ram-raids and robberies. Similarly, the opposition National Party leader Christopher Luxon has advocated sending young ram-raiders and other serious youth offenders to military-style boot camps.

In late August 2023, the Labour Government introduced a new bill, the Ram Raid Offending and Related Measures Amendment Bill, which seeks to add ram-raiding and other "smash and grab" offenses to the Crimes Act 1961 and give Police the power to prosecute juvenile ram raiders including 12 year olds. While the bill was supported by the Labour, National and ACT parties, it was opposed by the Green Party and Te Pāti Māori.

In November 2023, Newshub reported a gradual decline in ram raids in New Zealand throughout the year. Between January and September 2023, 407 ram raids were reported, compared with 707 in 2022. There were 33 reported ram raids in August 2023 and 28 in September. To counter ram-raiding, Police responses were managed at the district level and included significant investigations to identify and prosecute offenders. Police and other agencies were also trialling a strengthened multi-agency response in Auckland to address the causes of youth engaging in risky behaviour and offending. By November 2023, the Government had allocated NZ$6 million from the Proceeds of Crime Fund to counter ram raids such as installing bollards and other security for small retailers. In June 2024, RNZ reported that ram raids in New Zealand had declined from a peak of 433 in 2022 to 288 in 2023, citing Police figures. 67 ram raids were also reported in the first four months of 2024. There were 12 ram raids in April 2024 compared with 64 in April 2023. 70% of identified ram raiders were aged between 14 and 17 years while 12% were aged between 10 and 13 years.

== See also ==
- Smash and grab
- Vehicle-ramming attack
- Organized retail crime
