= Ellen Davis (businesswoman) =

American businesswoman

- Occupation: President of NRF Foundation

Ellen Davis (born 1978 or 1979) is executive vice president of industry engagement at the Consumer Brands Association. Previously, she served as president of the NRF Foundation and senior vice president of strategic initiatives at the National Retail Federation.

She coined the phrase "Cyber Monday," now considered the official kickoff of the online holiday shopping season, and has appeared frequently on broadcast news programs including Fox News, CNBC, CNN and ABC News.

Davis was born in Galesburg, Illinois.

== Education ==
She received a bachelor's degree in communications from Millikin University, and a master's degree in business administration from the Georgetown University McDonough School of Business.

== Career ==
Davis joined NRF in 2002 as manager of media relations before assuming her current roles. Since becoming president of the NRF Foundation in 2012, Davis launched the annual NRF Foundation Gala, formed the NRF Talent Acquisition Group of human resources executives from retailers, and led the creation of the Foundation's "RISE Up" training and credentialing program. She then left NRF in January 2020.

During February 2023, The U.S. Travel Association announced that Davis joined the organisation as an Executive Vice President of Business Strategy and Industry Engagement.

== Awards & honors ==
In 2007, Davis was named in the "15 to Watch" by PR NewsChannel. Fast Company covered Davis in their "Most Creative People" series in 2015 and Poets&Quants for Executives chose her as one of the "Best and Brightest EMBAs of 2016."
