= Transnational crime =

Crimes across national borders

Transnational crimes are crimes that have actual or potential effect across national borders and crimes that are intrastate but offend fundamental values of the international community. The term is commonly used in the law enforcement and academic communities. Transnational organized crime (TOC) refers specifically to transnational crime carried out by crime organizations.

The word transnational describes crimes that are not only international (that is, crimes that cross borders between countries), but crimes that by their nature involve cross-border transference as an essential part of the criminal activity. Transnational crimes also include crimes that take place in one country, but whose consequences significantly affect another country, and transit countries may also be involved. Examples of transnational crimes include: human trafficking, people smuggling, smuggling/trafficking of goods (such as arms trafficking and drug trafficking and illegal animal and plant products and other goods prohibited on environmental grounds (e.g. banned ozone depleting substances), sex slavery, terrorism offences, torture and apartheid.

Transnational crimes may also be crimes of customary international law or international crimes when committed in certain circumstances. For example, they may in certain situations constitute crimes against humanity.

== In failed or failing states ==
The international community is confronted with an increasing level of transnational crime in which criminal conduct in one country has an impact in another or even several others. Drug trafficking, human trafficking, computer crimes, terrorism, and a host of other crimes can involve actors operating outside the borders of a country which might have a significant interest in stemming the activity in question and prosecuting the perpetrator. Contemporary transnational crimes take advantage of globalization, trade liberalization and exploding new technologies to perpetrate diverse crimes and to move money, goods, services and people instantaneously for purposes of perpetrating violence for political ends.

Moreover, weakened states and transnational crime create an unholy confluence that is uniquely challenging. When a criminal operates outside the territory of an offended state, that state might ordinarily appeal to the state from which the criminal is operating to take action, such as prosecuting the offender domestically or extraditing the offender so that he or she may face punishment in the offended state. Nonetheless, when a government is unable or unwilling to cooperate in the arrest or prosecution of a criminal, the offended state has few options for recourse. Furthermore, often state actors are part of transnational criminal dynamics in conflict zones and benefit from the smuggling of illicit goods.

== International cooperation ==
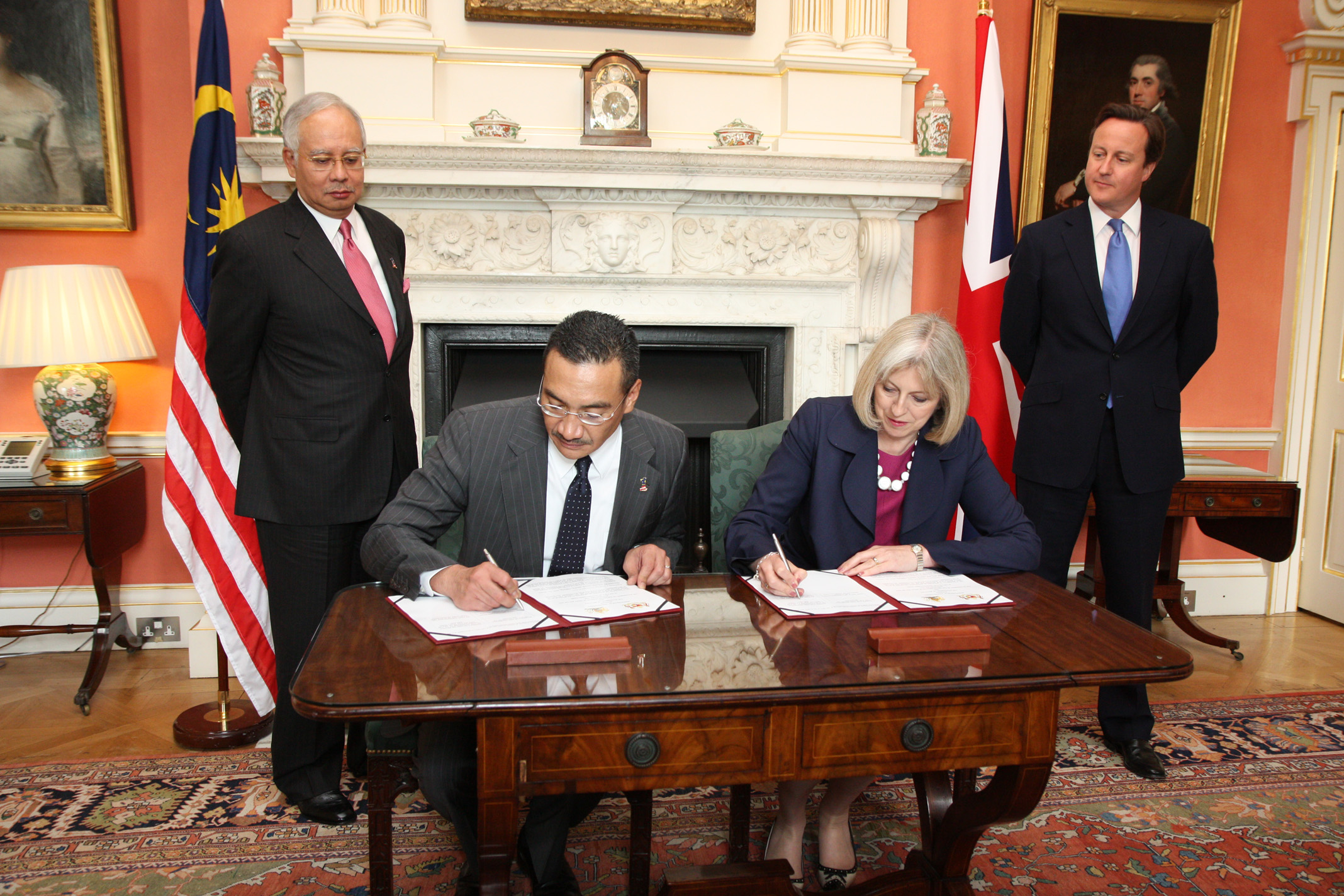
Foreign and Commonwealth Office. Home Secretary Theresa May with Malaysia Minister of Home Affairs Dato' Seri Hishammuddin Tun Hussein sign a "Memorandum of Understanding on transnational crime", 14 July 2011.

Given the limits on the exercise of extraterritorial enforcement jurisdiction, states have developed mechanisms to cooperate in transnational criminal matters. The primary mechanisms used in this regard are extradition, lawful removal, and mutual legal assistance.

Extradition is the mechanism by which one sovereign requests and obtains custody of a fugitive located within the jurisdiction and control of another sovereign. It is an ancient mechanism dating back to at least the thirteenth century BCE, when an Egyptian Pharaoh negotiated an extradition treaty with a Hittite king. Through the extradition process, a sovereign (the requesting state) typically makes a formal request to another sovereign (the requested state). If the fugitive is found within the territory of the requested state, then that state may arrest the fugitive and subject him or her to its extradition process. The extradition procedures to which the fugitive is subjected depend on the law and practice of the requested state.

Aside from mechanisms for the return of fugitives, states have also developed mechanisms for requesting and obtaining evidence for criminal investigations and prosecutions. When evidence or other forms of legal assistance, such as witness statements or the service of documents, are needed from a foreign sovereign, states may attempt to cooperate informally through their respective police agencies or, alternatively, resort to what is typically referred to as requests for "mutual legal assistance" The practice of mutual legal assistance developed from the comity-based system of letters rogatory, though it is now far more common for states to make mutual legal assistance requests directly to the designated "Central Authorities" within each state. In contemporary practice, such requests may still be made on the basis of reciprocity but may also be made pursuant to bilateral and multilateral treaties that obligate countries to provide assistance. Many countries are able to provide a broad range of mutual legal assistance to other countries even in the absence of a treaty.

The financial crime expert Veit Buetterlin explained that transnational crime types such as counterfeiting, smuggling, human trafficking, drug trafficking, illegal logging, illegal mining, or illegal wildlife trade can only be effective if the involved crime networks can launder the proceeds. He also mentioned that the international community needs to overcome a state where "criminals act internationally, while prosecutors stop at borders."

== See also ==
- Organized retail crime
