= Autozam Revue =

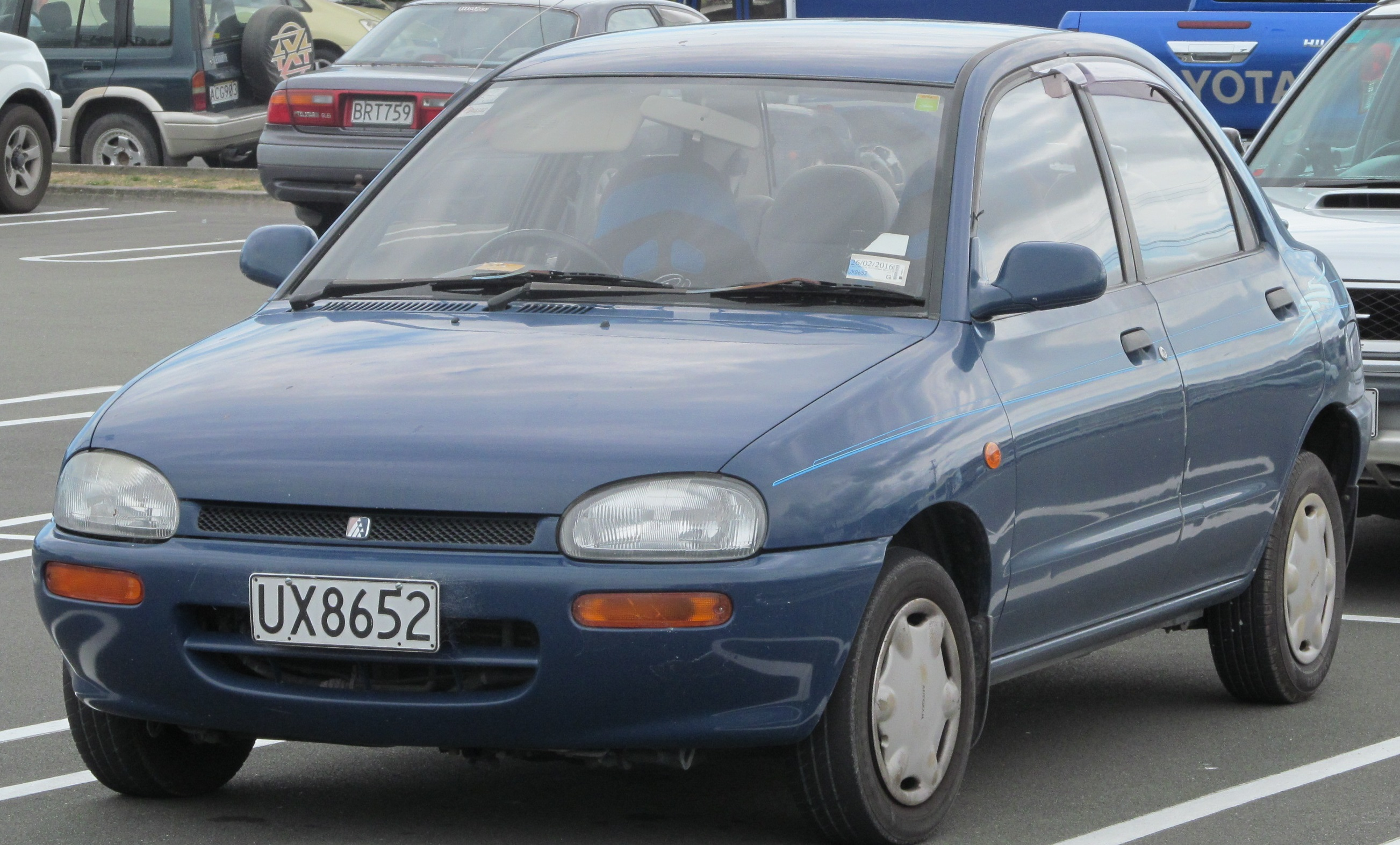

Overview
- Manufacturer: Autozam; Mazda
- Also called: Mazda 121; Mazda Revue
- Production: 1990–1998

Body and chassis
- Class: Subcompact
- Body style: 4-door sedan
- Platform: Mazda DB platform

Powertrain
- Engine: Petrol: 1.1 L B1 I4; 1.3 L B3 I4; 1.5 L B5 I4
- Transmission: 5-speed manual; 4-speed automatic

Dimensions
- Wheelbase: 2,390 mm (94.1 in)
- Length: 3,800 mm (149.6 in)
- Width: 1,655 mm (65.2 in)
- Height: 1,470 mm (57.9 in)
- Curb weight: 806 to 860 kg (1,776.9 to 1,896.0 lb)

Chronology
- Predecessor: Mazda 121 (DA)
- Successor: Mazda 121 (DW)/Mazda Demio

The Autozam Revue is a subcompact car that was sold by Autozam, introduced in 1990. The demise of that marque led to the cars being renamed as the Mazda Revue in some markets. The car was also sold in many export markets as the Mazda 121, where it replaced the previous 121 that had been based on the first-generation Ford Festiva.

The Revue was available in most markets as a small four-door saloon with an optional canvas sunroof added in February 1991. Its unconventional, tall and rounded look with a very short, separate trunk caused some consternation. While everyone else was chasing aerodynamics, the tall Revue/121 had a very uncompetitive drag coefficient of Cd=0.40. 1.1-, 1.3- and 1.5-litre engines were offered, with either five-speed manual or four-speed automatic transmission.

In 1996, the 121 name was shifted to export versions of the Mazda Demio, a tall, five-door hatchback, which became exported as the Mazda2 in its second generation. A Ford Fiesta, assembled at Ford's Valencia plant barely modified, but rebadged as the Mazda 121, was also sold in some markets after 1996 (where the Demio was sold at the same time with its original name). Sales of the Revue ended in Japan in June 1998.

== Australia ==
The Mazda 121 was often referred to as the "bubble car" or "jellybean" or "the hat" with the car's colour often added to the latter, for example: The little green jellybean. Australian models came standard with the 1.3 litre engine paired with the standard 5-speed manual and 4-speed automatic transmission. The 1.5-litre engine was added to the Australian range in 1994 and was used until 1996. This generation was briefly sold alongside its successor, the Mazda Demio which also wore the 121 nameplate, between 1996 and 1997.

== Europe ==
Sold as the Mazda 121 from 1991 until 1996, the unconventional saloon was first replaced by a badge-engineered Ford Fiesta, and shortly afterwards also by the Mazda Demio 5-door estate. Sales in Europe were generally meager, in part because it was priced very close to the larger 323. At the time of introduction, European-market cars were typically fitted with the 16-valve 1.3-litre engine with 73 PS (54 kW), with the 1.5 being reserved for Japan. Mazda also offered the 1.1-litre version of the engine for certain European markets where the tax and insurance regulations suited it.

In Belgium and the Netherlands, it is often referred as "de Bolhoed" (the Bowler Hat) because of its bubble shape.

== Engines ==
- 1991.01–1994 : 1.1 L (1,138 cc) B1, SOHC 8V, carburetor, 54 PS (40 kW; 53 hp) at 5,600 rpm, 8.8 kg⋅m (86 N⋅m; 64 lb⋅ft) at 3,600 rpm (Europe only)
- 1990–1996 : 1.3 L (1,324 cc) B3, SOHC 8V, EGI-S, 53 PS (39 kW; 52 hp) at 5,500 rpm, 9.9 kg⋅m (97 N⋅m; 72 lb⋅ft) at 2,800 rpm
- 1990–1998 : 1.3 L (1,324 cc) B3, SOHC 16V, EGI-S, 73 PS (54 kW; 72 hp) at 5,600 rpm, 10.5 kg⋅m (103 N⋅m; 76 lb⋅ft) at 3,600 rpm
- 1991–1998 : 1.5 L (1,498 cc) B5, SOHC 16V, EGI-S, 88 PS (65 kW; 87 hp) at 6,500 rpm, 12.0 kg⋅m (118 N⋅m; 87 lb⋅ft) at 4,000 rpm
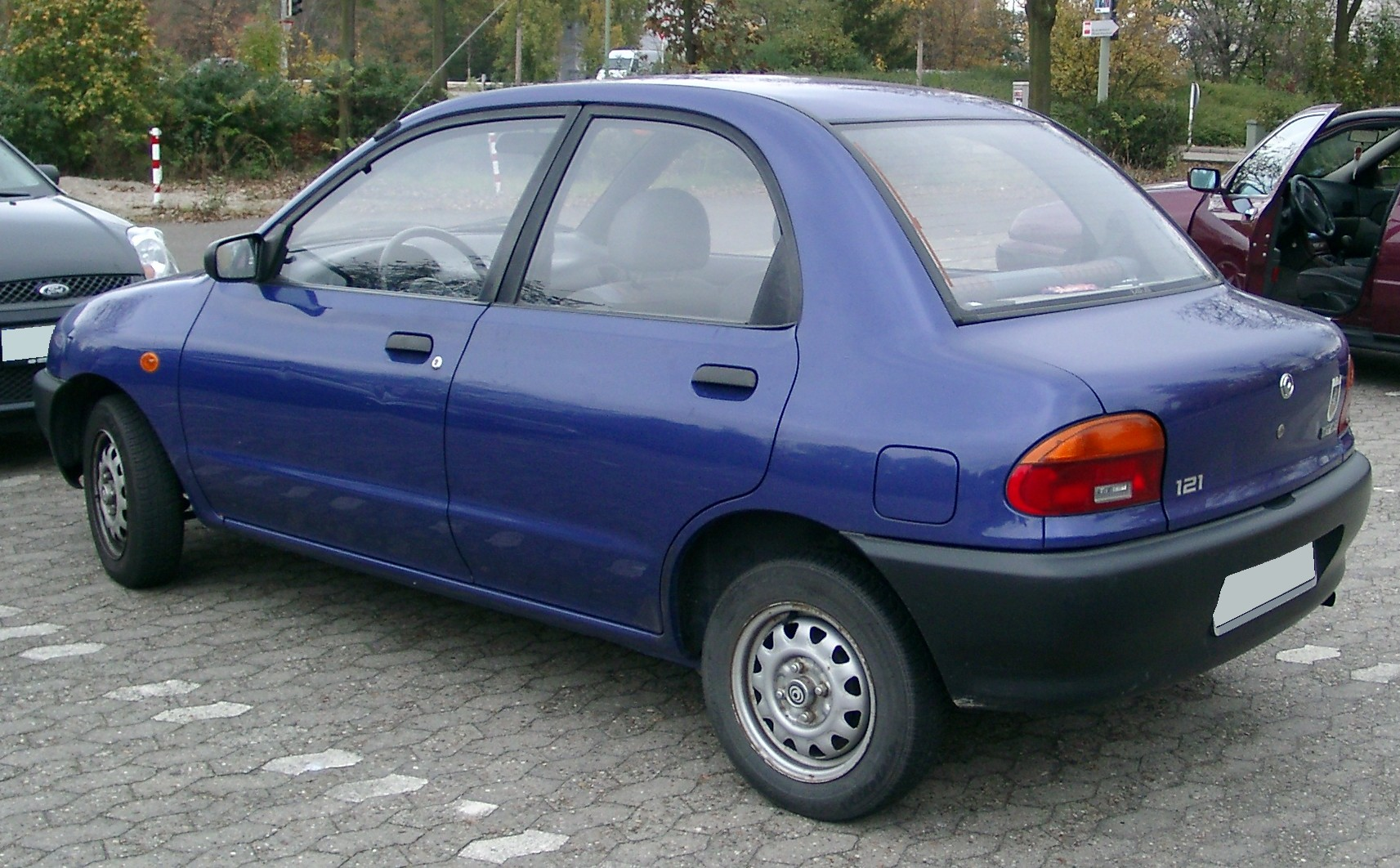
Mazda 121 (Europe)

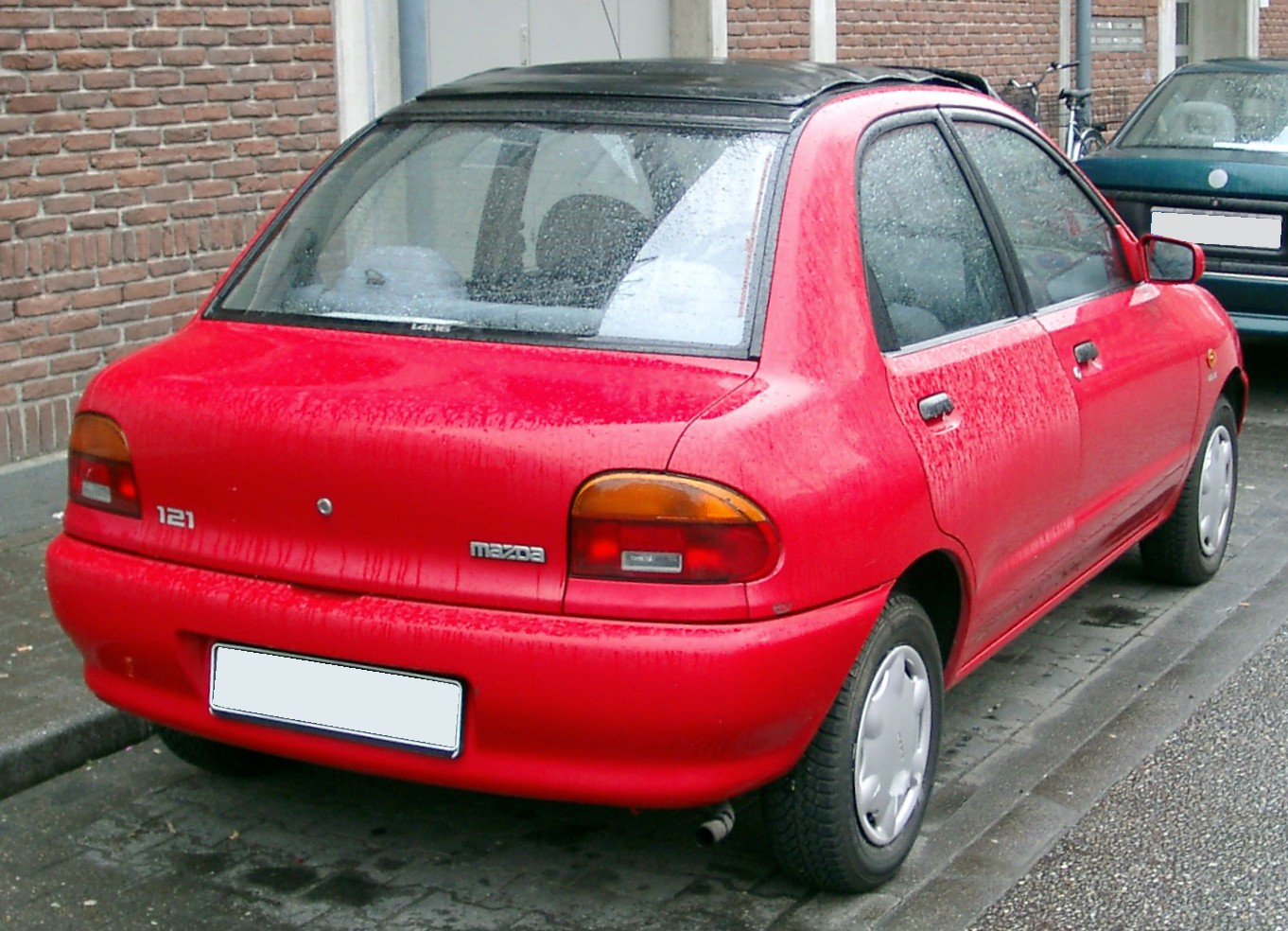
Mazda 121 with canvas roof (Europe)

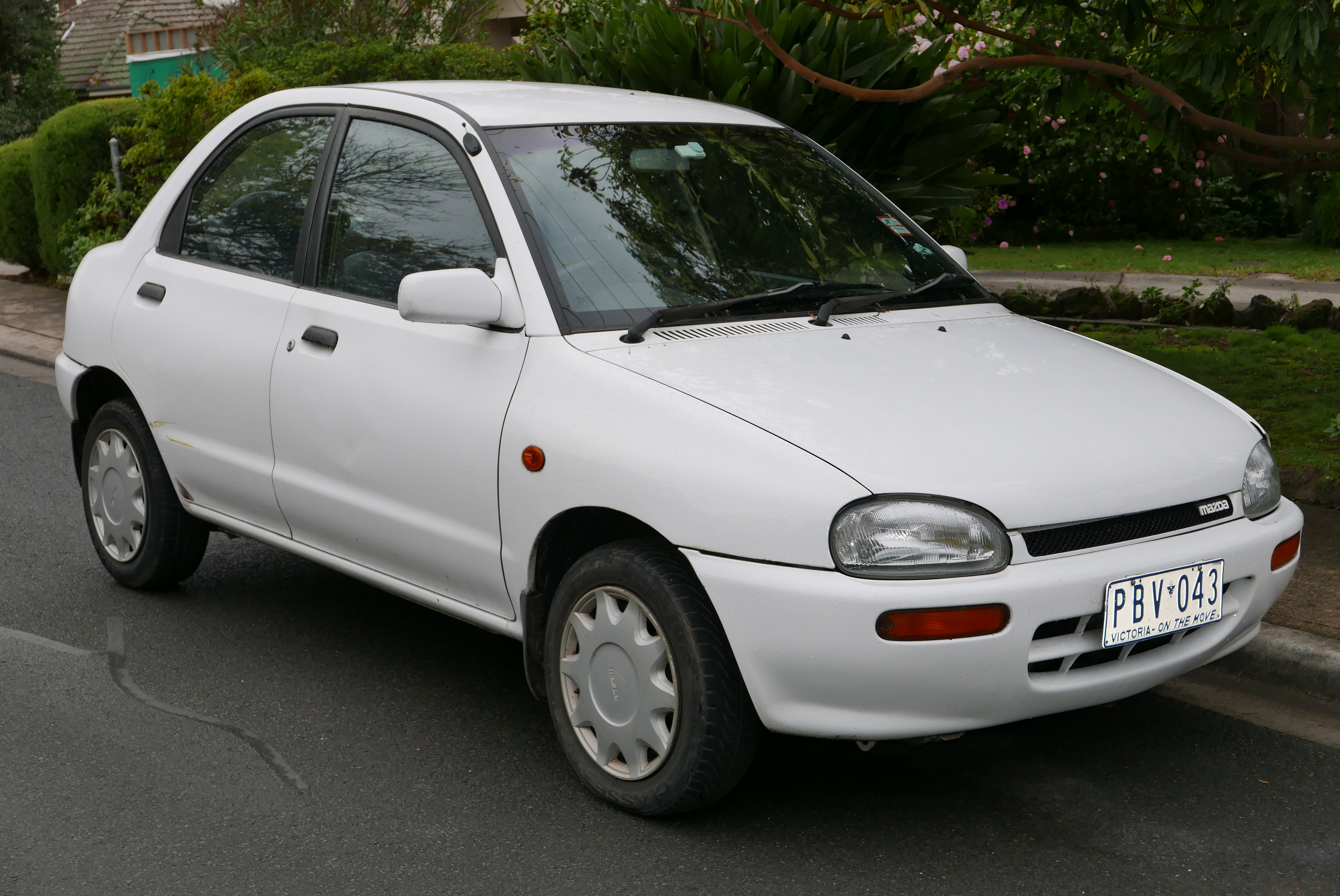
1991 Mazda 121 (DB) 1.3 sedan (Australia)

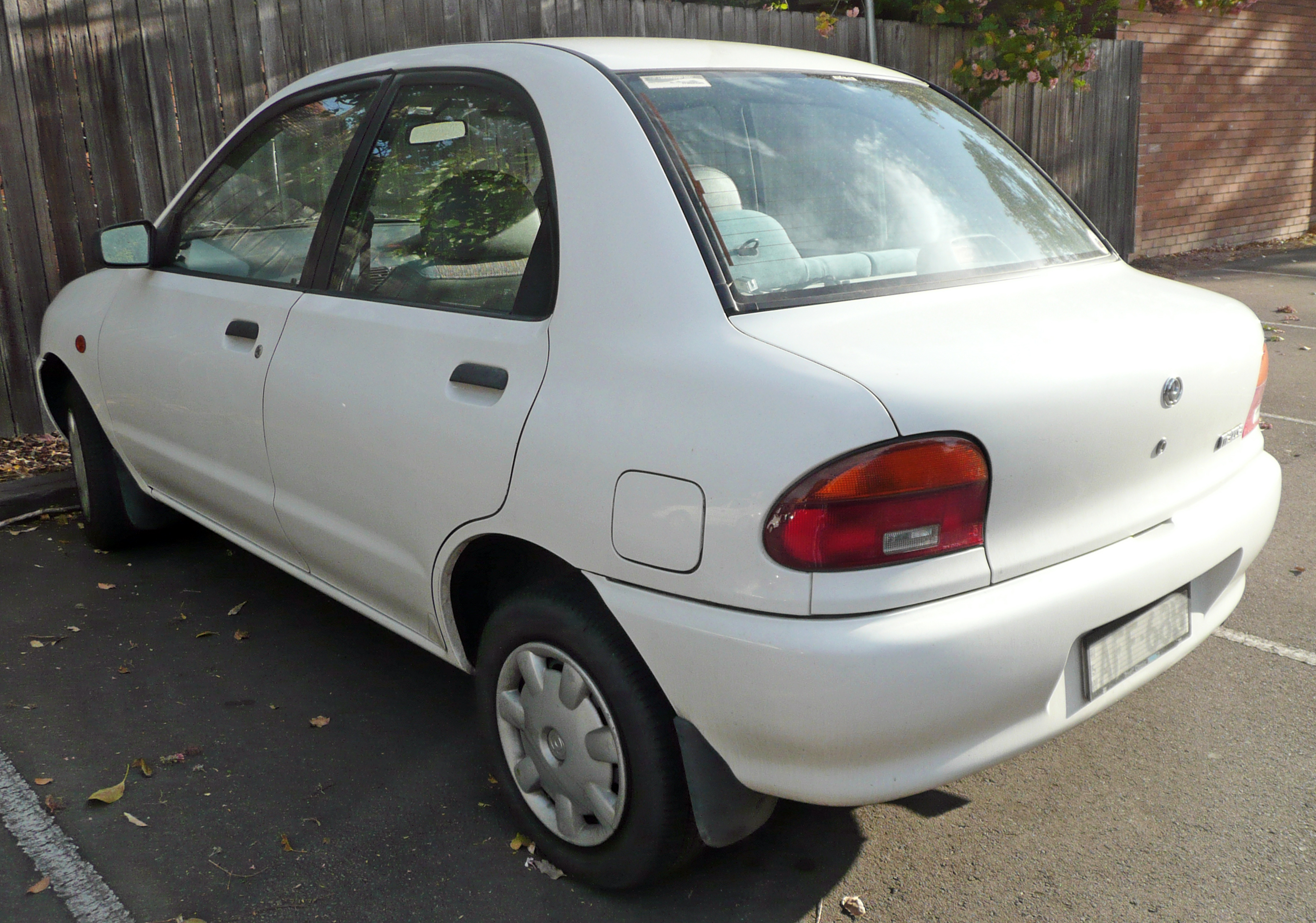
1996–1997 Mazda 121 1.5 (Australia)

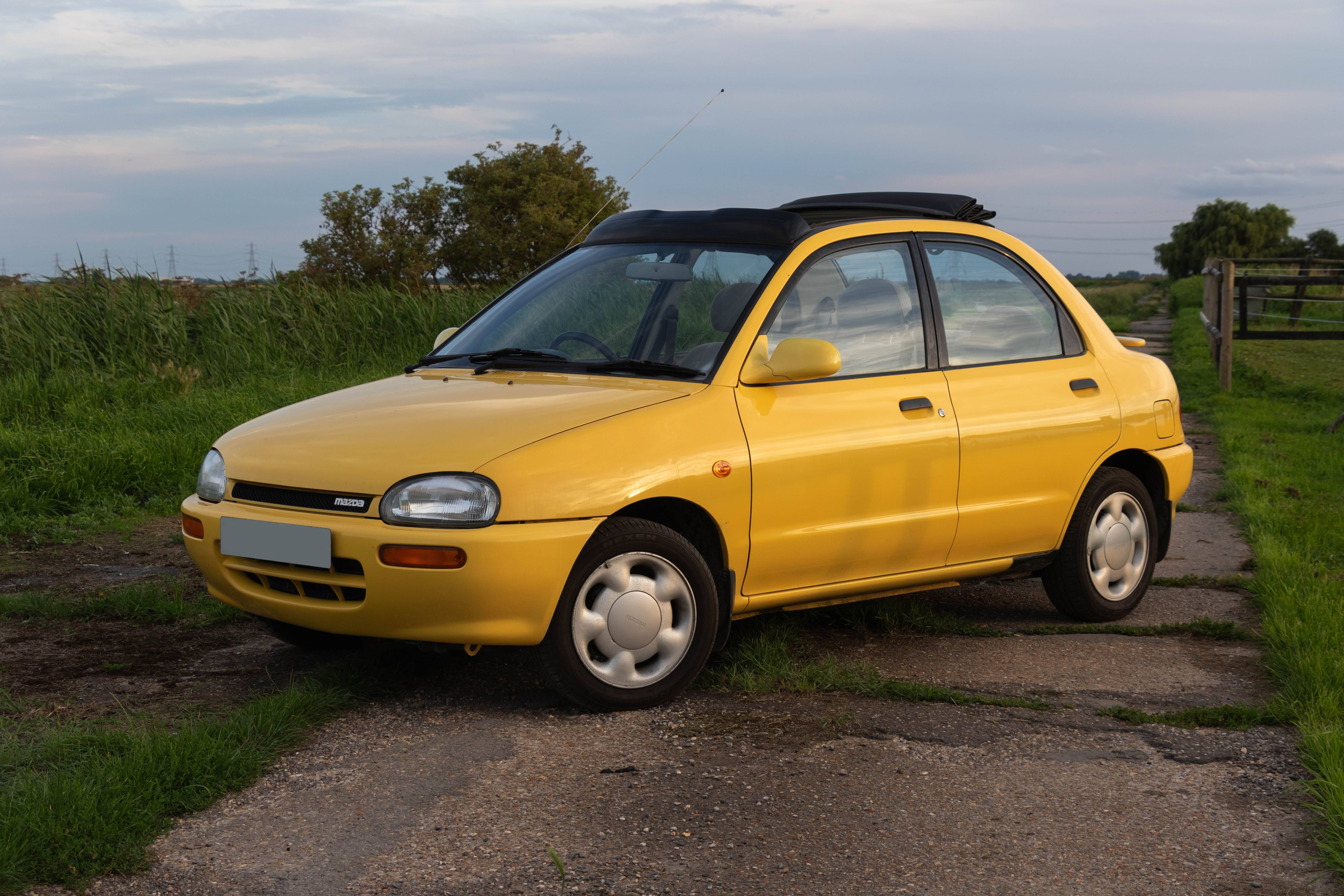
1993 Mazda 121 1.3 Fun Top (UK; Hong Kong Import)

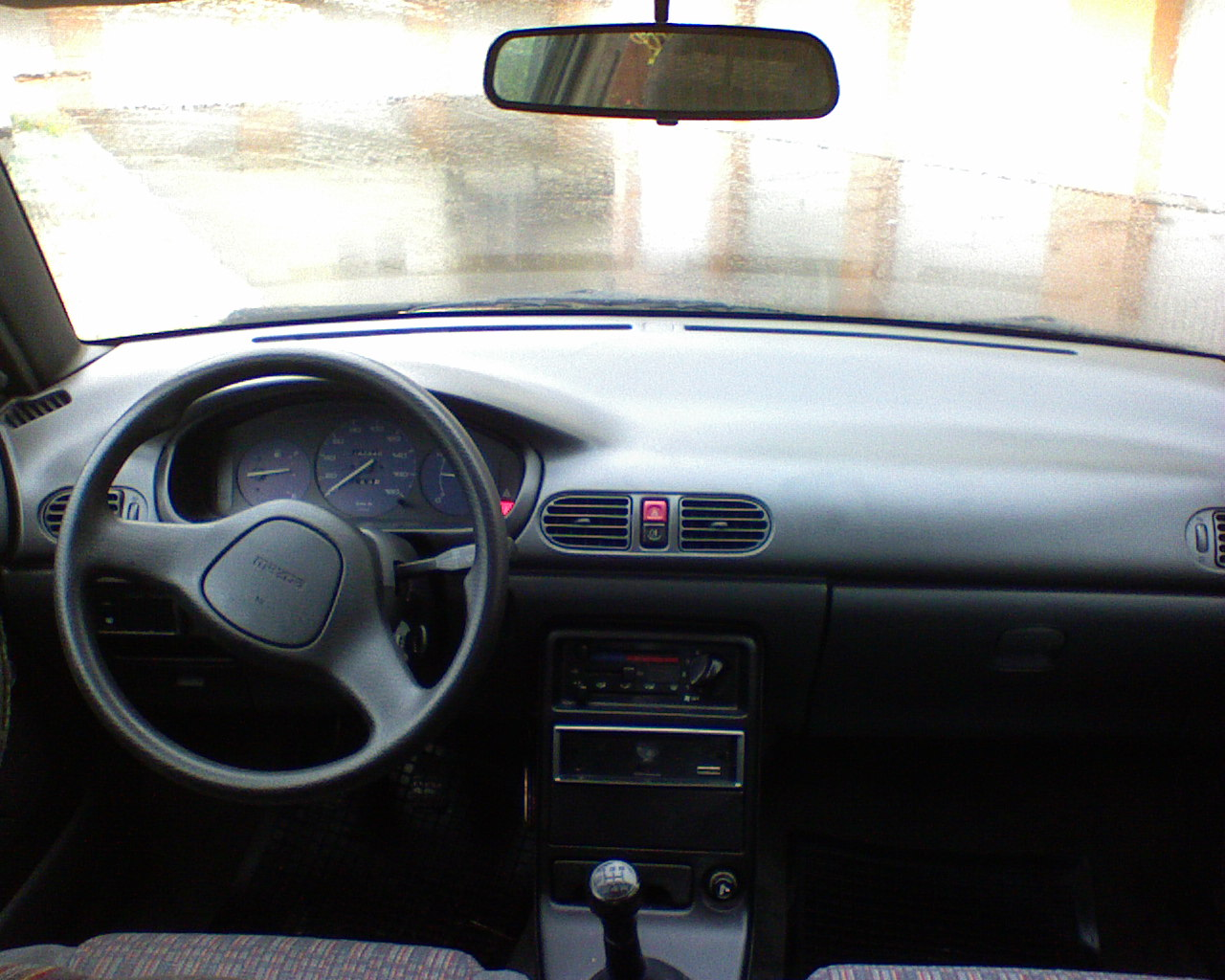
Interior
