= Matthew Shay =

American trade association executive

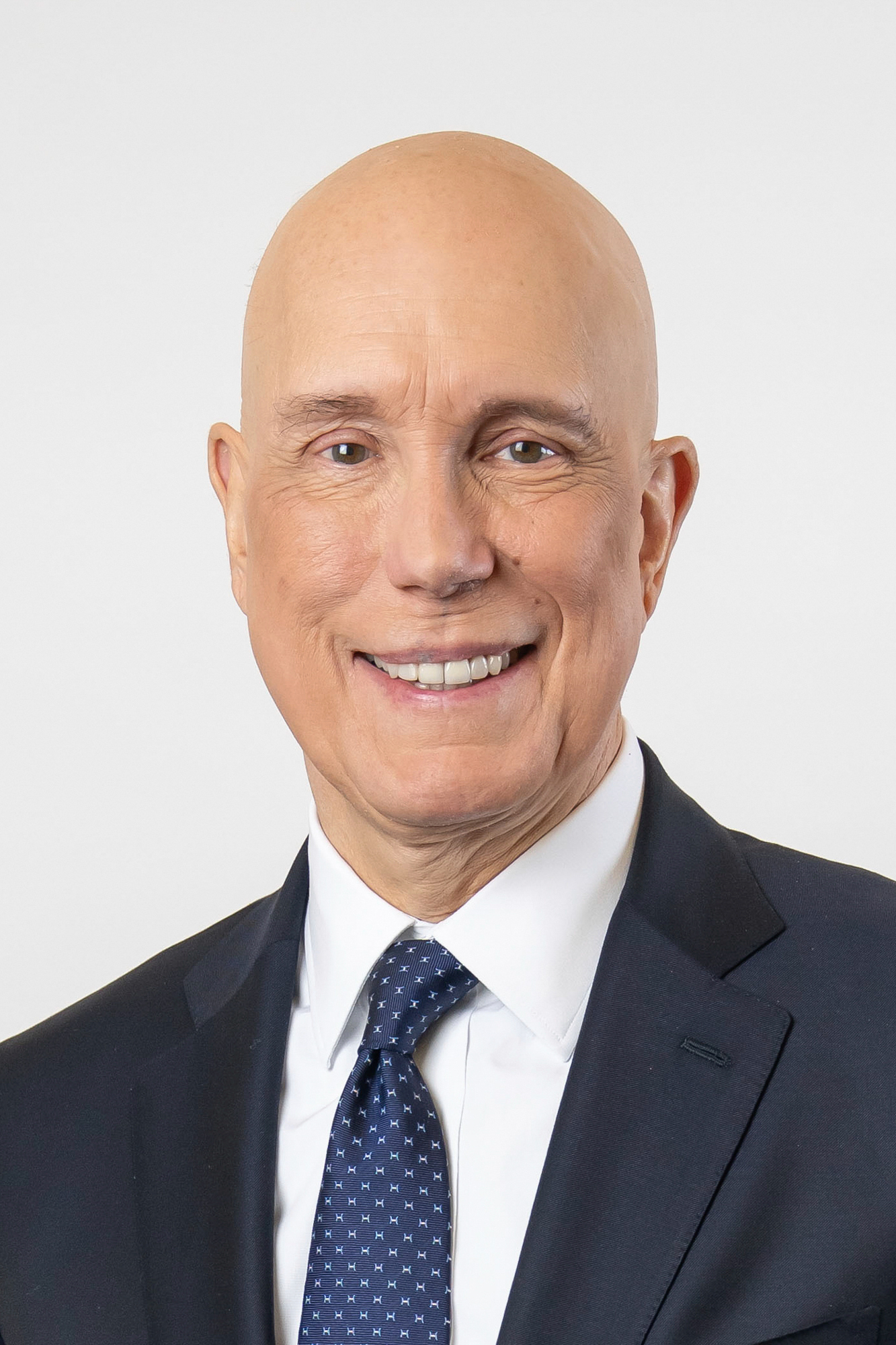
- Born: 1962 (age 63–64)
- Education: Wittenberg University (BA); Ohio State University (JD); Georgetown University (MBA)
- Occupation: CEO of National Retail Federation

Matthew R. Shay (born 1962) is an American trade association executive currently serving as the president and CEO of the National Retail Federation. He is a frequent guest on CNBC, Fox Business Network, and Bloomberg Television.

== Education ==
Shay is a graduate of Wittenberg University in Springfield, Ohio and The Ohio State University College of Law, and holds a master's degree in business administration from the Georgetown University McDonough School of Business. He also holds an honorary doctor of humane letters from Wittenberg University and an honorary degree of professional designation in merchandise marketing from the Fashion Institute of Design and Merchandising.

== Career ==
Before joining the National Retail Federation, Shay served as president and CEO of the International Franchise Association (IFA). Under his leadership, IFA restored the flow of credit to cash-strapped retail and other franchise businesses during the national recession.

Shay joined IFA in 1993, serving in a variety of capacities, including executive vice president and chief counsel, before being named president and CEO in 2004. Prior to joining IFA, Shay was assistant general counsel at the Ohio Council of Retail Merchants in Columbus.

== Awards and honors ==
Shay serves as chairman of the U.S. Chamber of Commerce Association Committee of 100 and is a member of the board at the U.S. Chamber of Commerce, So Others Might Eat (SOME) and the Ireland Funds America. He previously served as chairman of the ASAE Board of Directors and as a member of the board at the U.S. Capitol Historical Society and the Bryce Harlow Foundation.

In 2016, Shay received the International Franchise Association Dennis Wieczorek Free Enterprise Award. Association TRENDS named Shay the 2019 Association Executive of the Year, and he has been recognized by CEO Update as one of the top 50 nonprofit chief executives in Washington, D.C. Shay has been recognized by CEO Update as the 2020 trade association CEO of the year. He received The Ireland Funds' Business Leadership Award in 2020, and in 2018, Shay was honored with the Father Horace McKenna Humanitarian of the Year from SOME and the Business Leadership Award from The Fund for American Studies.
