= Smash and grab =

Style of burglary

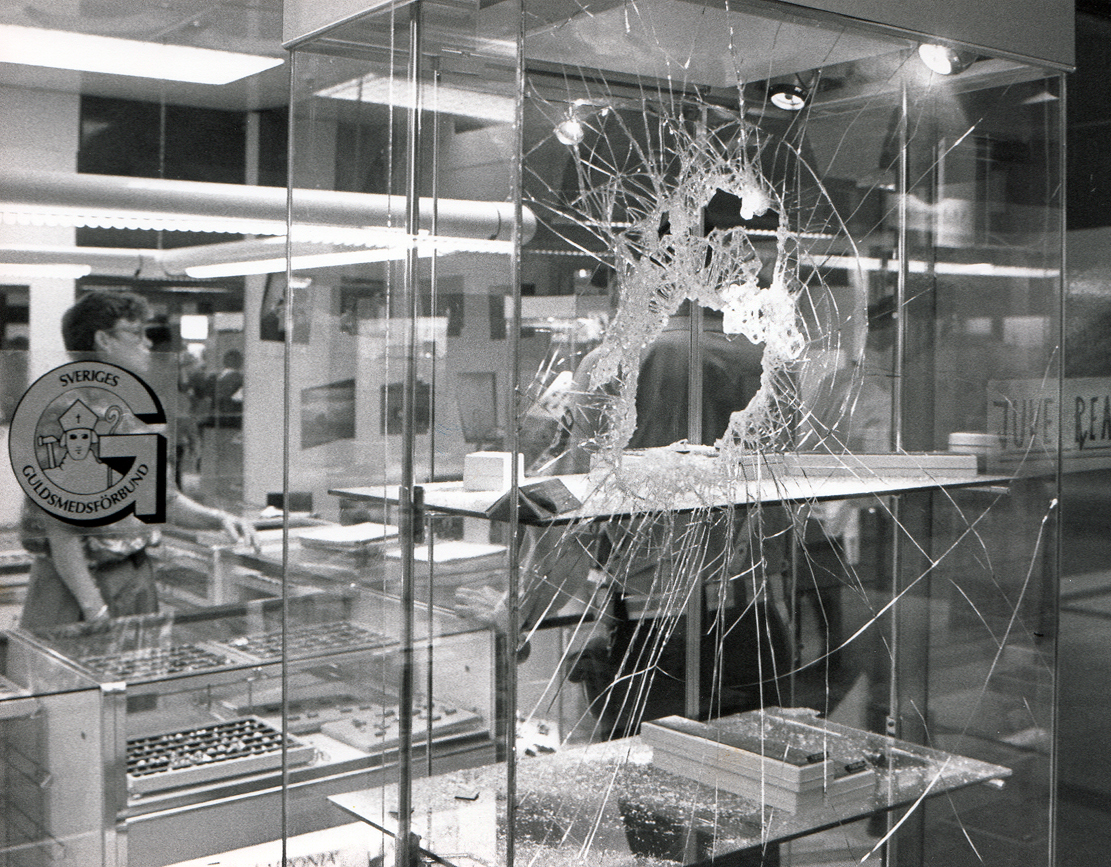
Police questioning a shop assistant shortly after a smash and grab coup in Caroli Gold in Malmö 1987.

A smash and grab is a particular form of burglary that involves smashing through a barrier (usually a glass installation such as a display window or a showcase) to gain access, grabbing items, and then making a quick getaway, without much concern for setting off alarms or creating noise. Typically, display windows and showcases that are in enclosed areas, such as shopping centers and museums, are less vulnerable to smash and grab thefts than those on open streets – particularly where the streets are poorly lit or unobserved (such as premises in pedestrian subways or unstaffed transport facilities).

The greatest cost of smash and grab raids can often be in replacing broken windows or walls, which can sometimes far exceed the cost of the goods that are stolen.

Smash and grab thefts also occur to vehicles, where a thief breaks a vehicle window and takes something from inside.

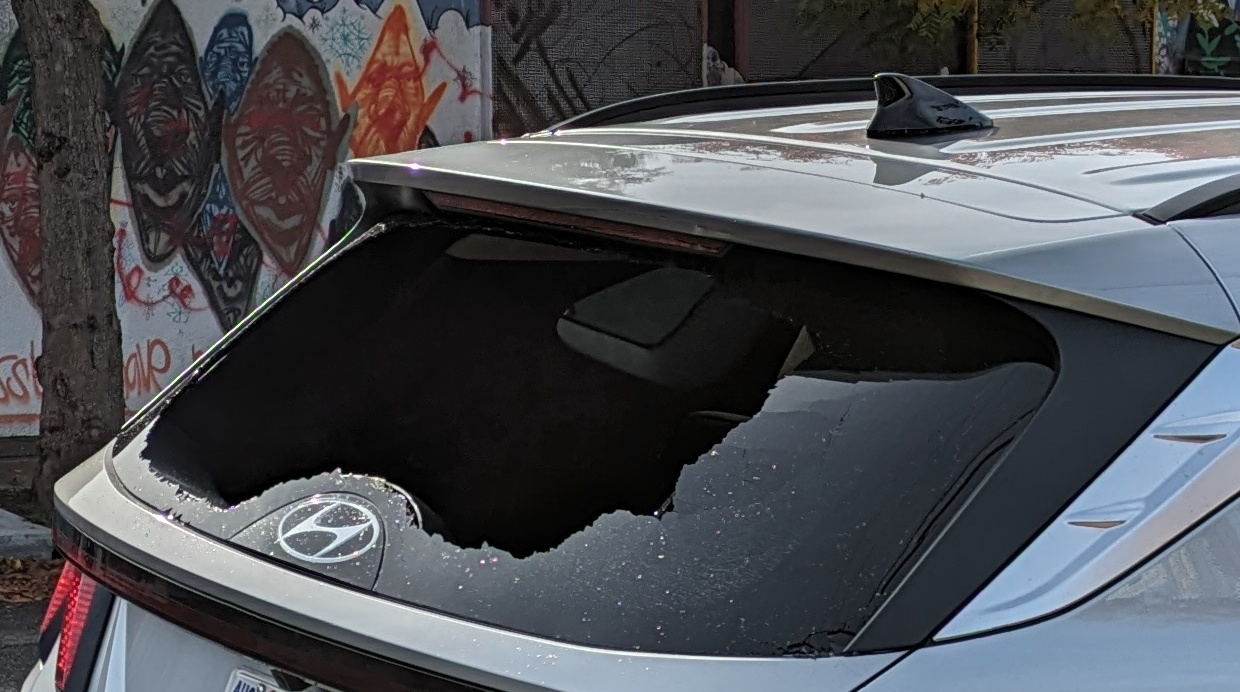
Smash-and-grab thefts also occur with vehicles.

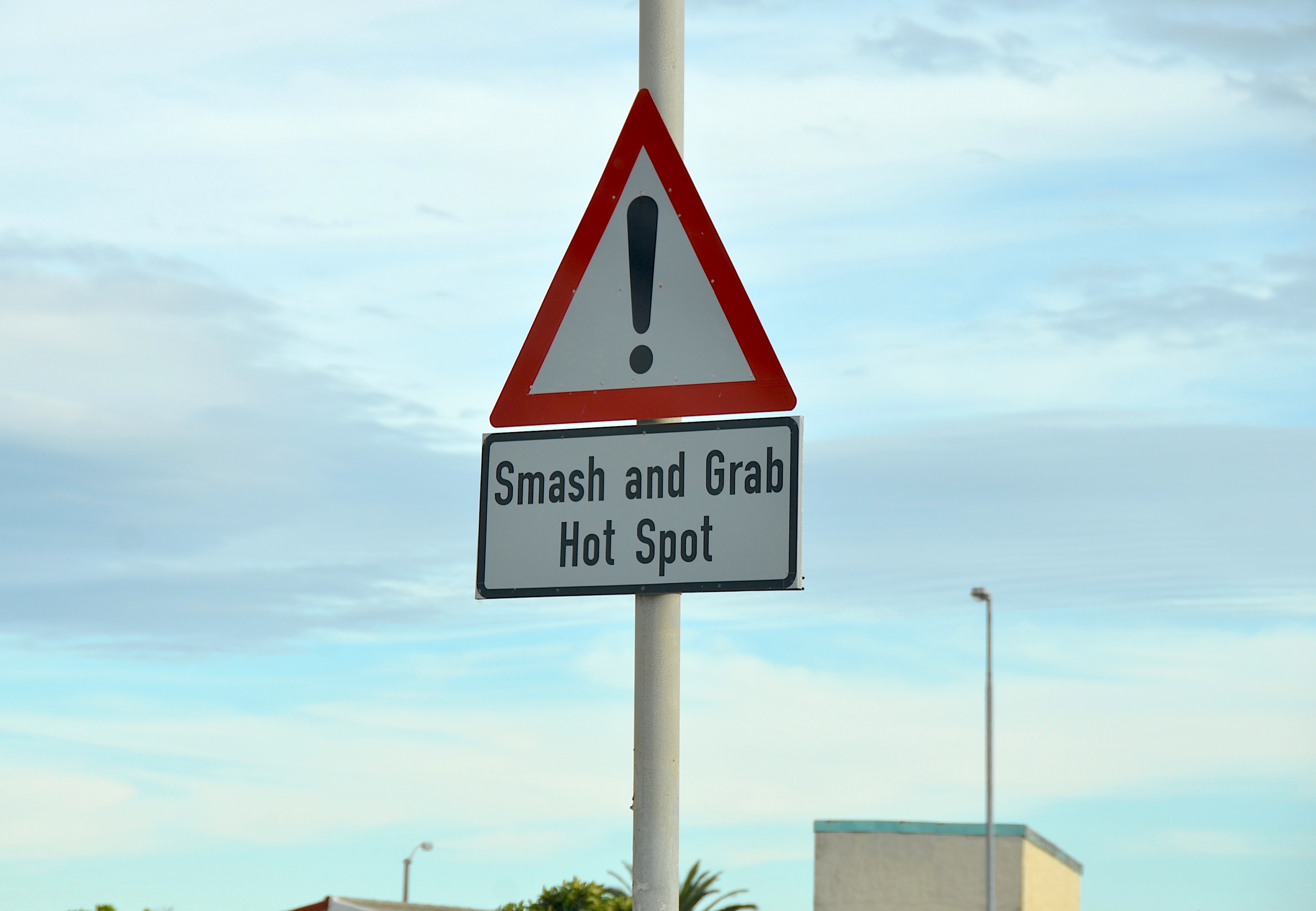
A road sign warning of the prevalence of smash and grab burglaries in the area

Recent smash and grab crimes, called ram-raiding, have also involved ramming a pickup truck through the walls of a convenience store or gas station in order to remove the ATM from the premises and recover the cash. Smash and grab raids can occur in many scenarios, both in broad daylight and at night, and the perpetrators can range from experienced thieves to impulsive vandals.

== Deterrence ==
There are several approaches to deterring smash and grab raiders. Shopkeepers can securely tether their goods, and make the tethering obvious to any onlookers. They can also avoid displaying goods of value in windows, an approach that has the disadvantage of reducing the attractiveness of the display to customers. Additionally, shopkeepers can strengthen window glass, to the extent that it can withstand, without breaking, being hit by the implements that smash and grab raiders are likely to use, such as hammers, bricks, and scaffolding poles.

Smash and grab raids became common in the 1930s, and were particularly prevalent in the 1940s, but decreased in frequency as shopkeepers took to strengthening their windows and fitting protective grilles. By the 1950s, forced entry to shops was being affected by using cars and grappling irons to pull window bars off windows, a precursor to ram-raiding.

== See also ==
- Organized retail crime
