= National Retail Federation =

Retail trade association

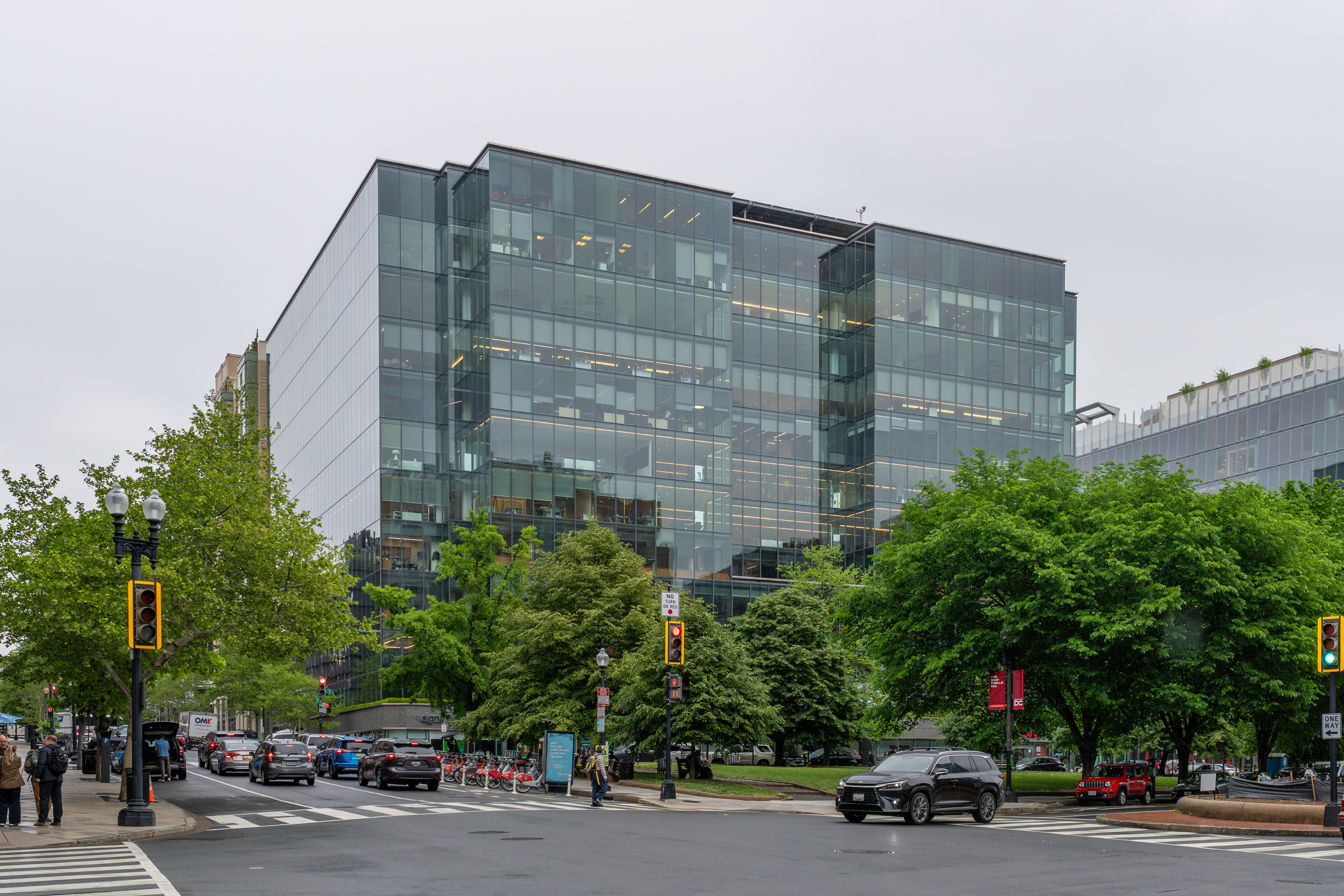
- Headquarters at 1101 New York Avenue
- Formation: June 1911 (115 years ago)
- Type: Retail trade association
- Headquarters: Washington, D.C., U.S.
- Location: United States
- Chief Executive Officer: Matthew Shay
- Website: www.nrf.com

The National Retail Federation (NRF) is the world's largest retail trade association. Its members include department stores, catalog, Internet, and independent retailers, restaurants, grocery stores, multi-level marketing companies and vendors.

NRF represents the largest private-sector industry in the United States that contains over 3.8 million retail establishments, supporting more than 52 million employees.

== History ==
The NRF began in 1911 as the National Retail Dry Goods Association (NRDGA). This was also the year of its first annual meeting. In 1958, the NRDGA was renamed the National Retail Merchants Association. In 1990, the association and the American Retail Federation merged to form the National Retail Federation. During all the years, an annual convention was held for members. The National Retail Federation (NRF) is the world's largest retail trade association, with members including department store, specialty, discount, catalogue, Internet, and independent retailers, chain restaurants, and grocery stores. It is also an umbrella group that represents more than 100 associations of state, national and international retailers.

In 2023, the group had to retract inaccurate claims it had made about the prevalence of organized shoplifting. Their 2023 report covered data from 2022 found external theft to be consistent with levels over the last 20 years of their data collection, accounting to roughly one third of all retail shrink. In 2024, the NRF replaced their previous retail data collection method with a survey of senior executives responsible for security and loss prevention. This new methodology reported allegedly significantly higher levels of retail theft compared to previous years. This conclusion has since been challenged by multiple sources. The 2024 report is sponsored by Sensormatic, a company that sells security tags and other shoplifting prevention technology.

In February 2025, U.S. retail sales declined by 0.22% month-over-month on a seasonally adjusted basis but increased by 3.38% year-over-year, according to the CNBC/NRF Retail Monitor powered by Affinity Solutions. The decline was attributed to concerns over tariffs, economic uncertainty, and adverse winter weather, which contributed to reduced consumer confidence and spending. Despite the monthly decline, core retail sales (excluding automobiles, gasoline, and restaurants) rose by 4.11% compared to the previous year, with online sales and health and personal care stores leading year-over-year growth.

The National Retail Federation (NRF) also highlighted concerns over economic uncertainty in early 2025, citing the potential effects of policies on tariffs, immigration, deregulation, and taxes.

In 2025, U.S. retail sales are expected to increase by 2.7% to 3.7% over 2024, reaching between $5.42 trillion and $5.48 trillion, according to the National Retail Federation (NRF). NRF cites ongoing economic momentum, though it also highlights factors such as policy uncertainty and inflation that could influence consumer spending.

== Lobbying ==
=== COVID-19 pandemic ===
NRF lobbied the United States government for relief for retailers during the COVID-19 pandemic. Measures advocated for included federal stays on default and foreclosure, rent abatement, and government-backed loans and payroll assistance. These later became programs including the CARES Act and Paycheck Protection Program. In July 2020, NRF asked for further financial assistance for retailers in a letter to congressional leadership. The letter requested an increase in funding to loan and financial assistance programs to help retailers retain employees, including expediting the Paycheck Protection Program loan forgiveness for all loans up to $150,000. In response to the COVID-19 pandemic, NRF's educational arm, the NRF Foundation, offered its introductory training course, Retail Industry Fundamentals, for free. This was done to support individuals applying for approximately 1 million jobs posted by U.S. retailers. NRF compiled those positions on its website job board.

=== Data handling ===
In November 2019, the Main Street Privacy Coalition, which included NRF, called on lawmakers to adopt a "uniform and fair framework" for the handling of sensitive data.

=== Interchange fees ===
NRF sued the Federal Reserve in 2011, saying regulations imposed by the Reserve on interchange fee caps allowed the cap to be too high. NRF won the initial suit, but the ruling was overturned on appeal. In 2012, United States District Court for the Eastern District of New York judge John Gleeson gave preliminary approval for a settlement in antitrust litigation filed by trade associations against credit card companies and other financial institutions regarding interchange fees. Retailers objected and NRF joined an appeal of the decision, winning the appeal in 2016. NRF lobbied the United States Supreme Court to let the ruling stand the following year. A US$30 billion settlement in the case was reached in March 2024. NRF opposed the agreement and it was rejected that June by District Court judge Margo Kitsy Brodie. The organization lobbied the Federal Reserve in 2023 and 2024 to further lower interchange fee caps.

=== Organised retail crime ===
The organization was part of a coalition that lobbied for the INFORM Consumers Act of 2022, which would have required online retailers to verify the identities of high volume sellers. NRF lobbied Congress for the passage of the Combating Organized Retail Crime Act in 2023. The law would have decreased barriers to prosecuting felony theft and created an intragovernmental resource sharing system.

=== Patent reform ===
NRF was a founding member of the United for Patent Reform coalition, a group that lobbied Congress for regulation on patent trolling. NRF wrote an amicus curiae brief with the United States Supreme Court in Oil States Energy Services, LLC v. Greene's Energy Group, LLC in support of rules that allowed patent disputes to be heard by the Patent Trial and Appeal Board of the United States Patent and Trademark Office rather than requiring litigation.

=== Supply chain ===
NRF has argued that there is a harmful economic impact of the trade war with China.

In September 2021, NRF launched an advocacy campaign "S.O.S: Save Our Shipments" in response to the crisis in American's supply chains. It advocated for the passage of the Ocean Shipping Reform Act of 2022, which aimed to reduce the costs of ocean-based shipping. In 2024, NRF led a group of 177 trade associations in calling on the Biden administration to resolve the 2024 United States port strike.

NRF defeated an effort to repeal debit card swipe fee reform that has saved retailers and their customers an estimated $8 billion a year since 2011, blocking an effort to allow the card industry to resume price-fixing of debit card fees.

=== Tax reform ===
In 2017, NRF lobbied Congress against a border-adjustment tax (BAT) in the United States and urged legislators to instead institute income tax reform. NRF's campaign against the BAT included an infomercial-style advertisement aired during Fox & Friends and Saturday Night Live.

NRF opposed the passage of the Affordable Care Act (ACA), saying that its requirements negatively impacted staffing and consumer prices. The organization supported the passage of the American Health Care Act of 2017, which would have partially repealed the ACA, including the removal of individual and employer mandates to get or provide health insurance.

The organization lobbied for reform to online sales tax collection laws filed an amicus curiae brief in South Dakota v. Wayfair, Inc. that supported repealing the Quill Corp. v. North Dakota decision. Quill Corp. prevented sales tax from being collected by states if the retailer did not have a physical presence in that state.

=== Overtime pay ===
NRF championed a Department of Labor final rule, which expanded overtime pay eligibility. The final rule was applauded by NRF as a reasonable, thoughtful approach to updating the nation's overtime rates, bringing overtime eligibility up to speed with the modern economy.

== Conferences ==
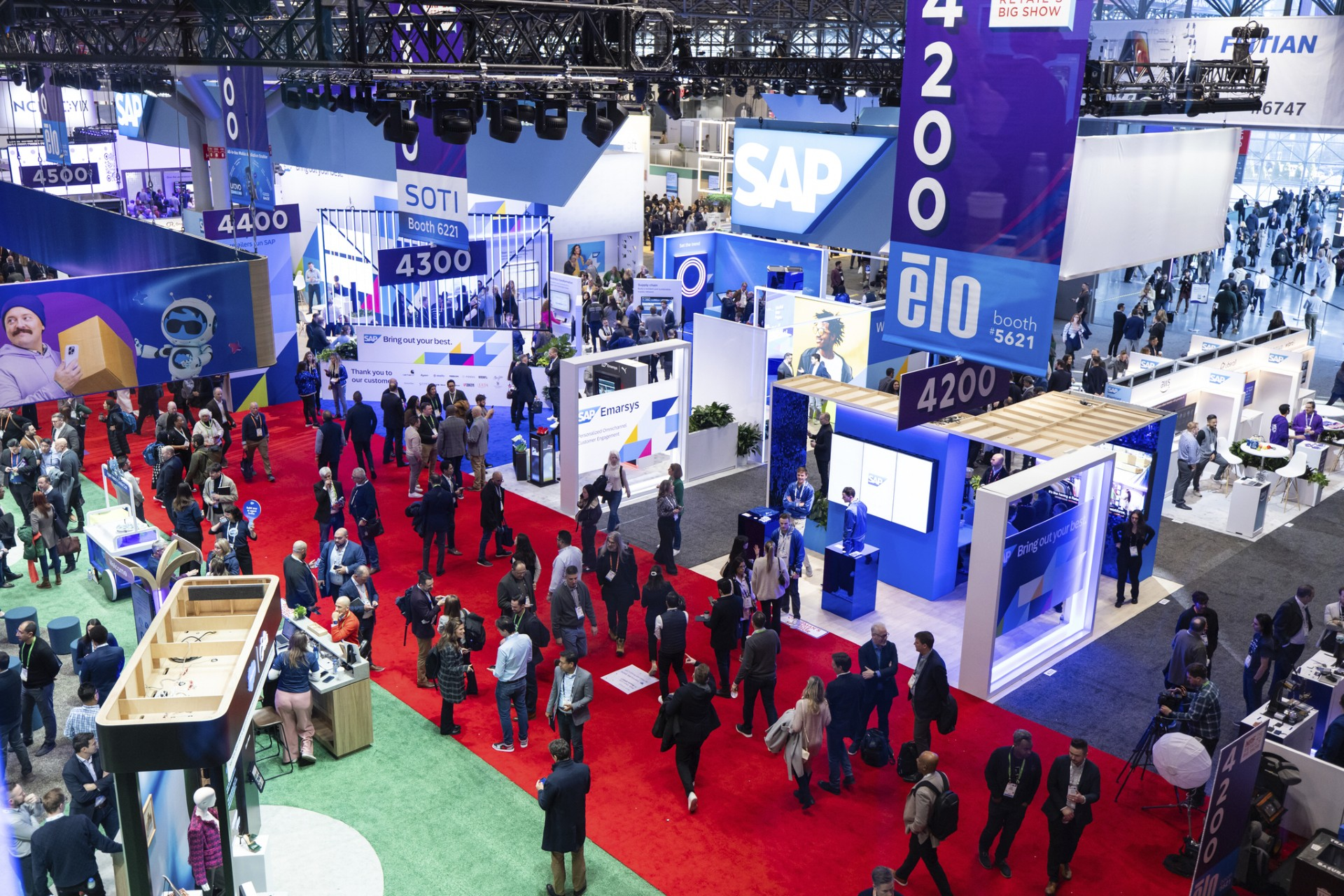
Big Show in 2025

In 2018, Big Show had more than 300 speakers, 500 exhibitors, 36,500 attendees and 500 sessions. In 2019, Big Show had 500 speakers, 700 exhibitors, 37,000 attendees and 500 sessions.

In 2020, Big Show had more than 300 speakers, 800 exhibitors, 40,000 attendees and 200 sessions. In 2023, the 113th annual convention of the National Retail Federation, NRF 2023: Retail's Big Show, brought together more than 35,000 attendees.

The 2025 conference had approximately 40,000 attendees and 1,000 exhibitors.

=== NRF's State of Retail & the Consumer ===
The National Retail Federation hosted its fourth annual State of Retail & the Consumer virtual discussion on March 20, 2024.

The program featured NRF President and CEO Matthew Shay moderating a conversation with NRF Chairman and Walmart U.S. President and CEO John Furner, and a discussion with NRF Chief Economist Jack Kleinhenz and CNBC Senior Economics Reporter Steve Liesman.

NRF also announced its forecast that retail sales during 2024 will grow between 2.5% and 3.5% from 2023 to between $5.23 trillion and $5.28 trillion.

== Leadership ==
In mid-March 2010, the NRF announced that Matt Shay, who had headed the International Franchise Association (IFA), would become NRF's president and CEO on May 10, 2010, replacing Tracy Mullin, who was retiring. Mullin joined NRF in 1976 and became president in 1993. Shay joined the IFA in 1993 and was named president in 2004 and chief executive in 2007.

The organization's revenue doubled under Shay, with its largest revenue source—conferences and conventions, including the Big Show and Shop.org—growing by nearly two and a half times. According to data provided to Retail Dive by the National Retail Federation (NRF), the organization's net assets have quadrupled. NRF membership has thousands of companies as members, including a mix of retailers, industry partners, and small businesses. In 2013, Shay was instrumental in securing Walmart as a member after years of engagement efforts.

== Retail sales ==
The National Retail Federation releases an annual retail sales forecast each spring. NRF forecast that 2025 retail sales will grow between 2.7% and 3.7% to between $5.42 trillion and $5.48 trillion. The 2025 sales forecast compares with 3.6% annual sales growth of $5.29 trillion in 2024. The 2025 forecast is in line with the 10-year pre-pandemic average annual sales growth of 3.6%. Additionally, NRF issues a retail sales forecast for each winter holiday season. Retail sales during the 2024 November to December holiday season grew 4% over 2023 to a record $994.1 billion.

== COVID-19 pandemic ==
Throughout the COVID-19 pandemic, NRF has asked the federal government to step in to support retailers coping with a serious downturn in discretionary spending. In March, NRF called for mandatory default and foreclosure stays or federally ordered rent abatement to relieve retailers faced with closure orders.

NRF also suggested government-backed loans and tax relief, including reinstatement of the net operating loss carryback, assistance with payroll costs, and expansion of employee retention tax credits to retailers with financial losses related to the decline in purchases of most goods beyond food and other essentials.

In July, NRF asked for further financial assistance for retailers in a letter to congressional leadership. The letter requested an increase in funding to loan and financial assistance programs to help retailers retain employees, including expediting the Paycheck Protection Program loan forgiveness for all loans up to $150,000.

In response to the COVID-19 pandemic, NRF's educational arm, the NRF Foundation, offered its introductory training course, Retail Industry Fundamentals, for free. This was done to support individuals applying for the almost 1 million jobs posted by U.S. retailers. NRF compiled those positions on its website job board.

== National associations and members represented ==
NRF members include department, specialty, discount, catalog, internet, independent stores, chain restaurants, drug stores, grocery stores and retail associations.
