= Retail's BIG Show =

Annual New York City retail trade show

Retail's Big Show
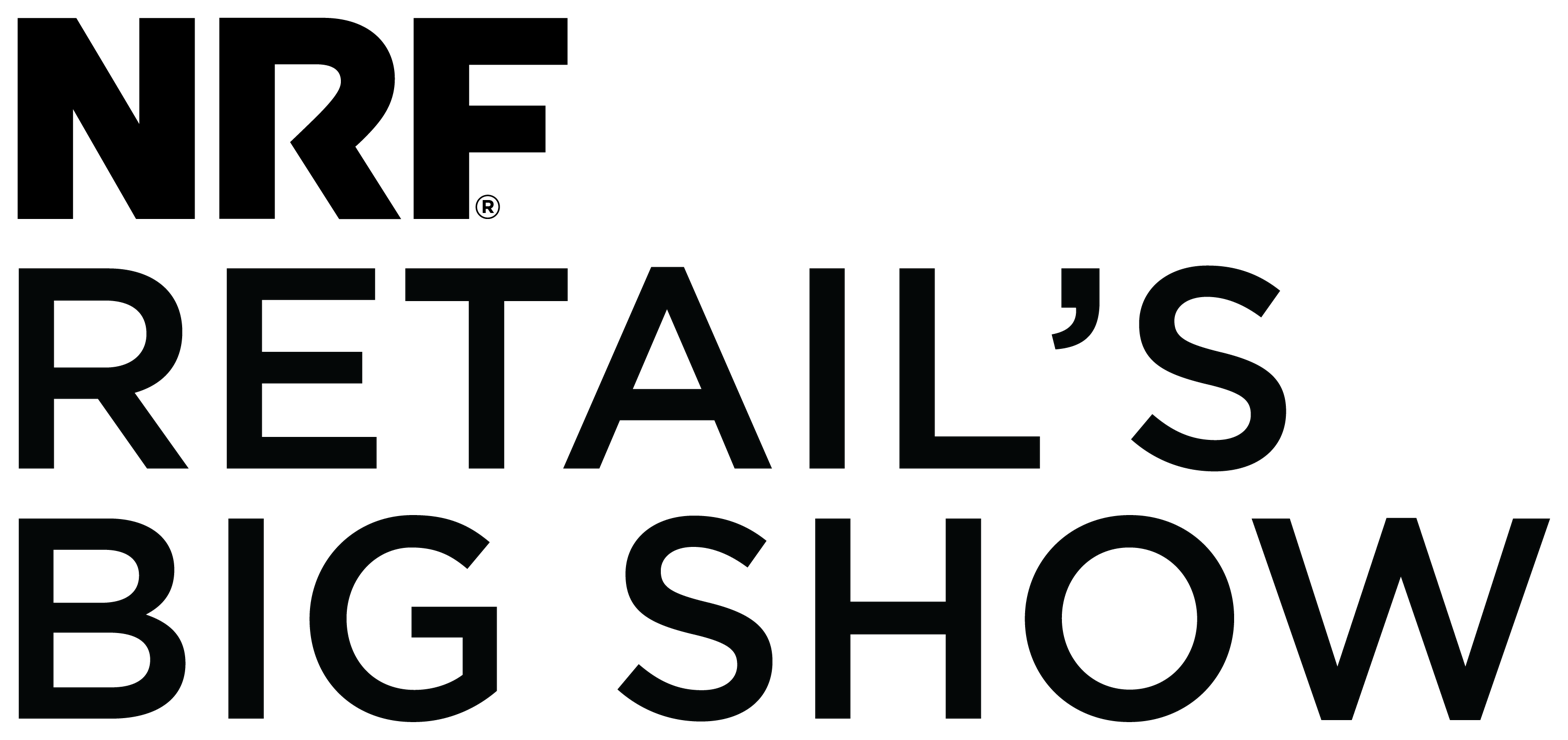
- Status: Active
- Genre: Retail
- Venue: New York, New York
- Location: Jacob K. Javits Convention Center
- Country: U.S.
- Inaugurated: January 1911
- Attendance: 37,000
- Organizer: National Retail Federation
- Website: Official website

The NRF Annual Convention & EXPO, also known as Retail's Big Show, is an industry conference organized by the National Retail Federation (NRF). It is held annually over three days in New York City.

Its membership includes department stores, specialty shops, discount and catalogue retailers, online and independent retailers, chain restaurants, and grocery stores. The organization also serves as an umbrella group representing more than 100 associations of state, national, and international retailers.

== History ==
The organization was established in 1911 as the National Retail Dry Goods Association (NRDGA), which also marked the year of its first annual meeting. In 1958, the NRDGA was renamed the National Retail Merchants Association. In 1990, it merged with the American Retail Federation to form the National Retail Federation. Throughout its history, the association has held annual conventions for its members.

== Events ==
The NRF Retail’s Big Show is held annually for over three days in January, at the Jacob K. Javits Convention Center in New York City. The Expo floor features over 1,000 exhibitors and more than 100 sessions, covering a wide range of topics such as sustainability, visual merchandising and the global economy. Exhibitors also offer their own sessions with product demos and case studies titled Exhibitor Big Ideas. in 2026, it included new tracks such as an AI Stage and Startup Hub.

The NRF Foundation Gala takes place annually during the NRF convention. The event raises funds to support the foundation’s programs and recognizes 25 individuals included on the foundation’s “List of People Shaping Retail’s Future.” Some of the honorees also participate as speakers at Retail's Big Show.

The Innovation Lab was introduced in 2018 to highlight emerging retail technologies, including robotics, augmented reality, and faster checkout systems. In 2021, the convention was held virtually and included sessions on business changes related to the COVID-19 pandemic. Former U.S. Secretary of State Condoleezza Rice delivered the keynote address.
