= Mazda Demio =

Small car manufactured and marketed globally by Mazda

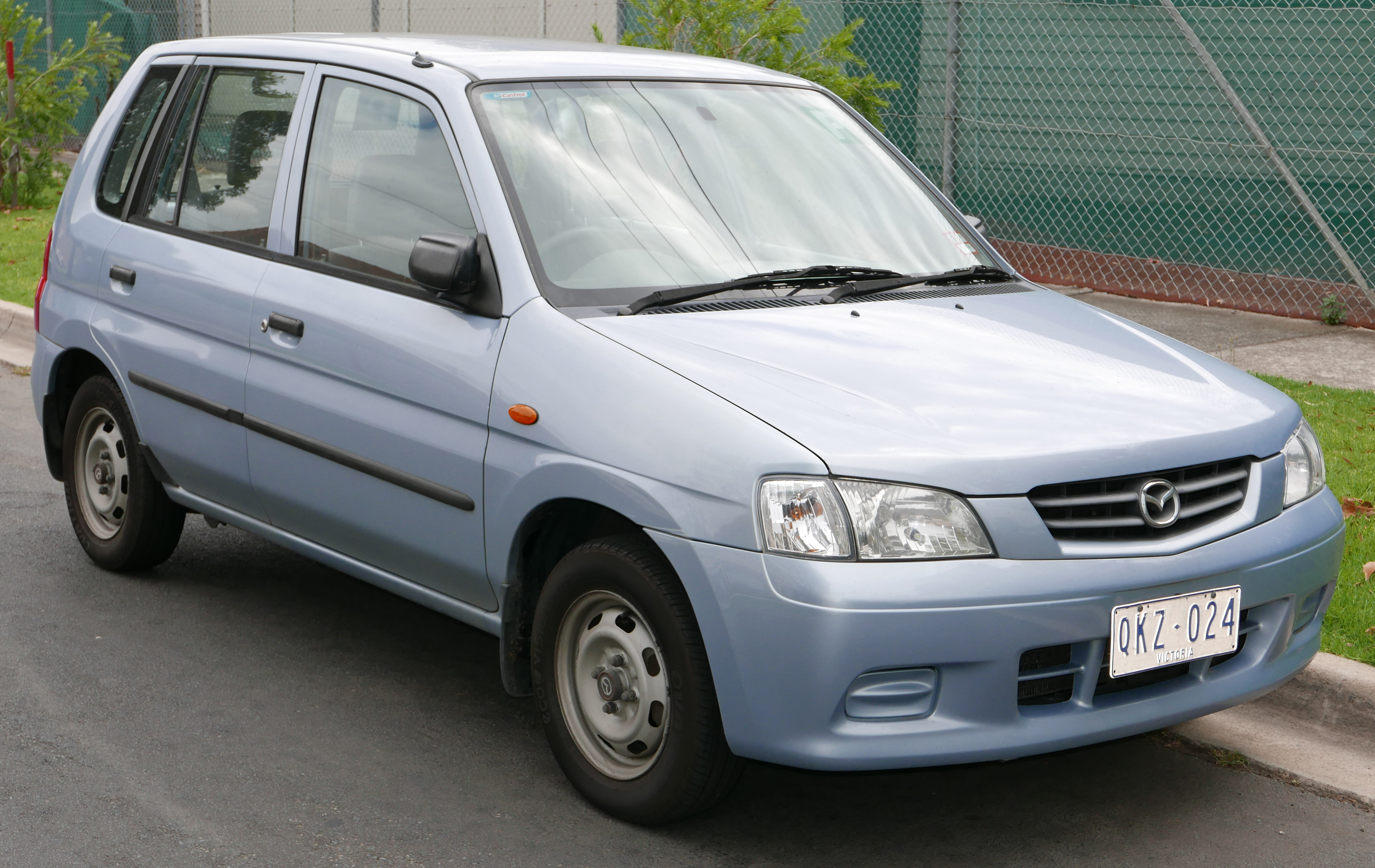
- 2000 Mazda 121 Metro Shades (Australia)

Overview
- Manufacturer: Mazda
- Also called: Mazda 121 (1996–2002); Mazda2 (2002–2019)
- Production: 1996–2019

Body and chassis
- Class: Subcompact/Supermini (B)
- Layout: Front-engine, front-wheel-drive
- Platform: Mazda D platform

Chronology
- Predecessor: Ford Festiva/Mazda 121; Autozam Revue
- Successor: Mazda2 (DJ) (renamed to)

The Mazda Demio (マツダ・デミオ, Matsuda Demio) is a small car manufactured by Mazda from 1996 to 2019. While sold across four generations in the domestic Japanese market, the Demio nameplate was rarely used outside of Japan, where it was usually called the Mazda2. The Demio nameplate was retired in 2019 as Mazda changed over to "Mazda2" for their home market as well. It has been described as a supermini or a subcompact car, and is a part of the B-segment of the European car market.

The Demio is built on the Mazda D platform and was preceded by two other small cars based on the platform: the Ford Festiva (designed and built by Mazda for Ford and also sold as the Mazda 121) that was introduced in 1986 and the Revue (sold by Mazda's Autozam marque) introduced in 1990. The name "Demio" is derived from Latin meus to show possession, which in many Romance languages has become "mio."

The third generation Demio was among the top three finalists of the World Car Awards, which it won, while the fourth generation won the 2014–2015 Car of the Year Japan.

The first generation Demio was sold as the Ford Festiva Mini Wagon in some markets.

== First generation (DW; 1996) ==
First generation
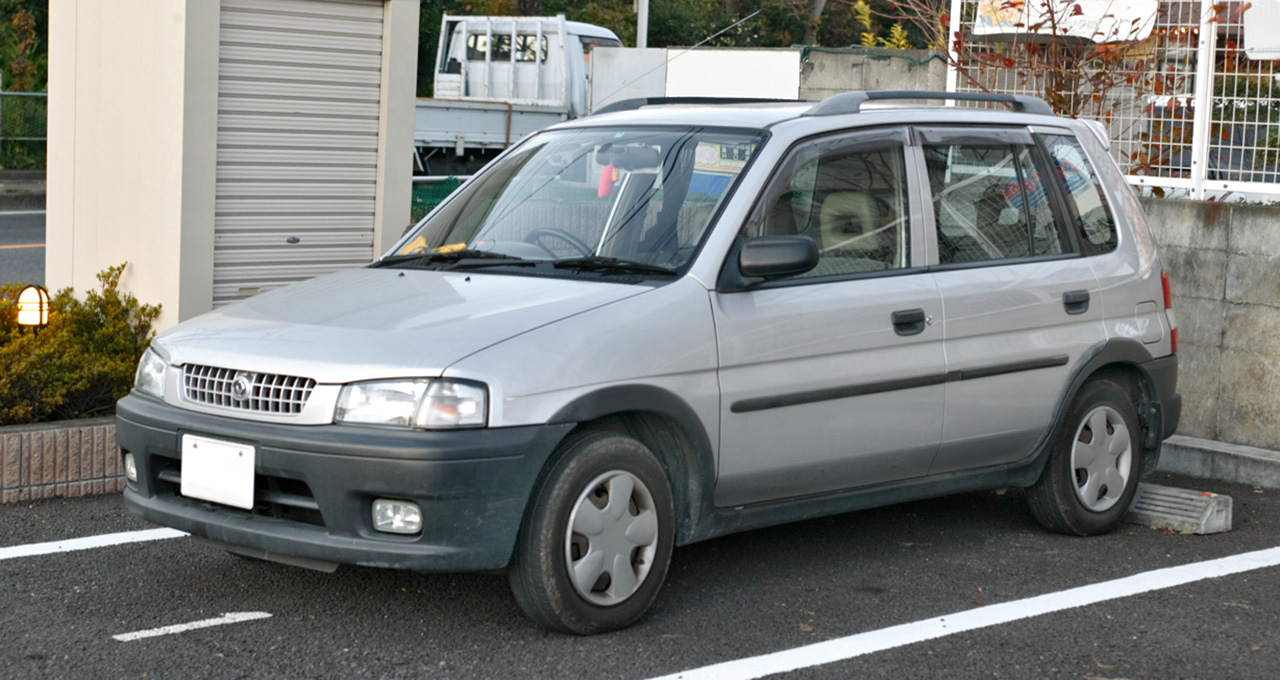
- 1998 Mazda Demio (Japan; pre-facelift)

Overview
- Model code: DW
- Also called: Mazda 121; Ford Festiva Mini Wagon
- Production: 1996–2002
- Assembly: Hiroshima, Japan (Hiroshima Plant); Valencia, Spain (Ford Spain); Bogotá, Colombia (CCA)

Body and chassis
- Body style: 5-door hatchback
- Platform: Mazda DW platform

Powertrain
- Engine: 1.3 L B3E/B3-ME I4; 1.5 L B5E/B5-ME I4
- Transmission: 5-speed manual 3-speed automatic 4-speed automatic

Dimensions
- Wheelbase: 2,390 mm (94.1 in)
- Length: 3,815 mm (150.2 in)
- Width: 1,670 mm (65.7 in)
- Height: 1,535 mm (60.4 in)

When it came to redesigning the sedan-only Revue, Mazda came up with a tall hatchback, minivan-esque package - the Revue, at 1.5 metres (59.1 in), had also been unusually tall. Introduced in a time full of negative press coverage for the company, the Demio became a surprise hit for Mazda in Japan, and also foreshadowed B-segment minivans such as the Opel Meriva, Fiat Idea and the Renault Modus.

A concept model previewing the DW series, called the Mazda BU-X was shown in 1995.

At its introduction in 1997, it won the Automotive Researchers' and Journalists' Conference Car of the Year award in Japan.

Production of the new Demio started in July 1996 (sold as the 121 outside Japan and Europe) used the DW platform. Ford retailed a version in Japan as the Ford Festiva Mini Wagon. In 1997, the Mazda logo was changed to the current logo. The Demio received a horizontal grille in September 1998 for Japanese market. The Demio received a facelift in December 1999 with a revised exterior, redesigned dashboard, cabin air filtration, retuned automatic transmission, and available DSC. The original Demio was replaced in 2002.

=== Engines ===
- 1.3 L B3-ME I4 (1996–1999)
- 1.5 L B5-ME I4 (1996–1999)
- 1.3 L B3E I4, 83 PS (61 kW)/ 108 N⋅m (80 lb⋅ft) (1999–2002)
- 1.5 L B5E I4, 100 PS (74 kW)/ 127 N⋅m (94 lb⋅ft) (2000–2002)

=== Production ===
The original DW model was produced in Mazda's Colombia plant as "Mazda Demio" until the end of 2007 when the DE model replaced it.

=== Gallery ===
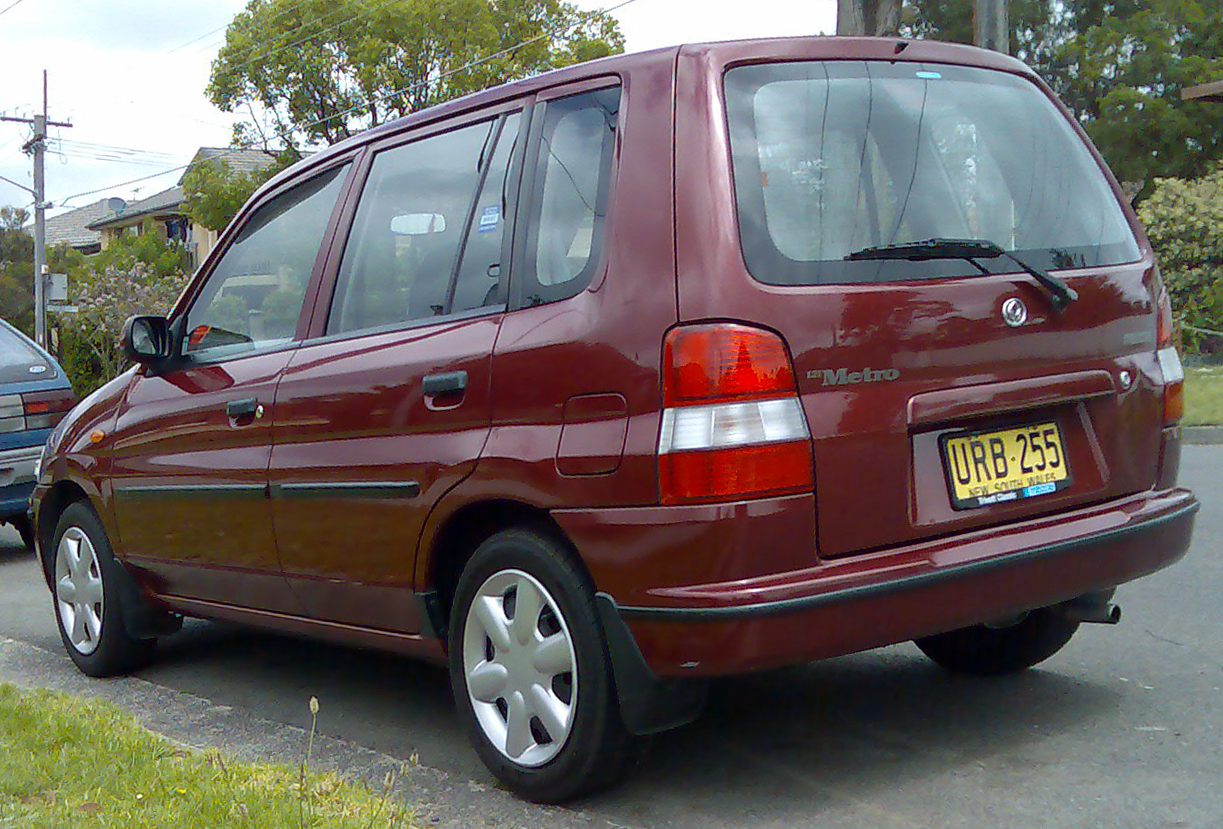
1996–1997 Mazda 121 Metro (Australia; pre-facelift)

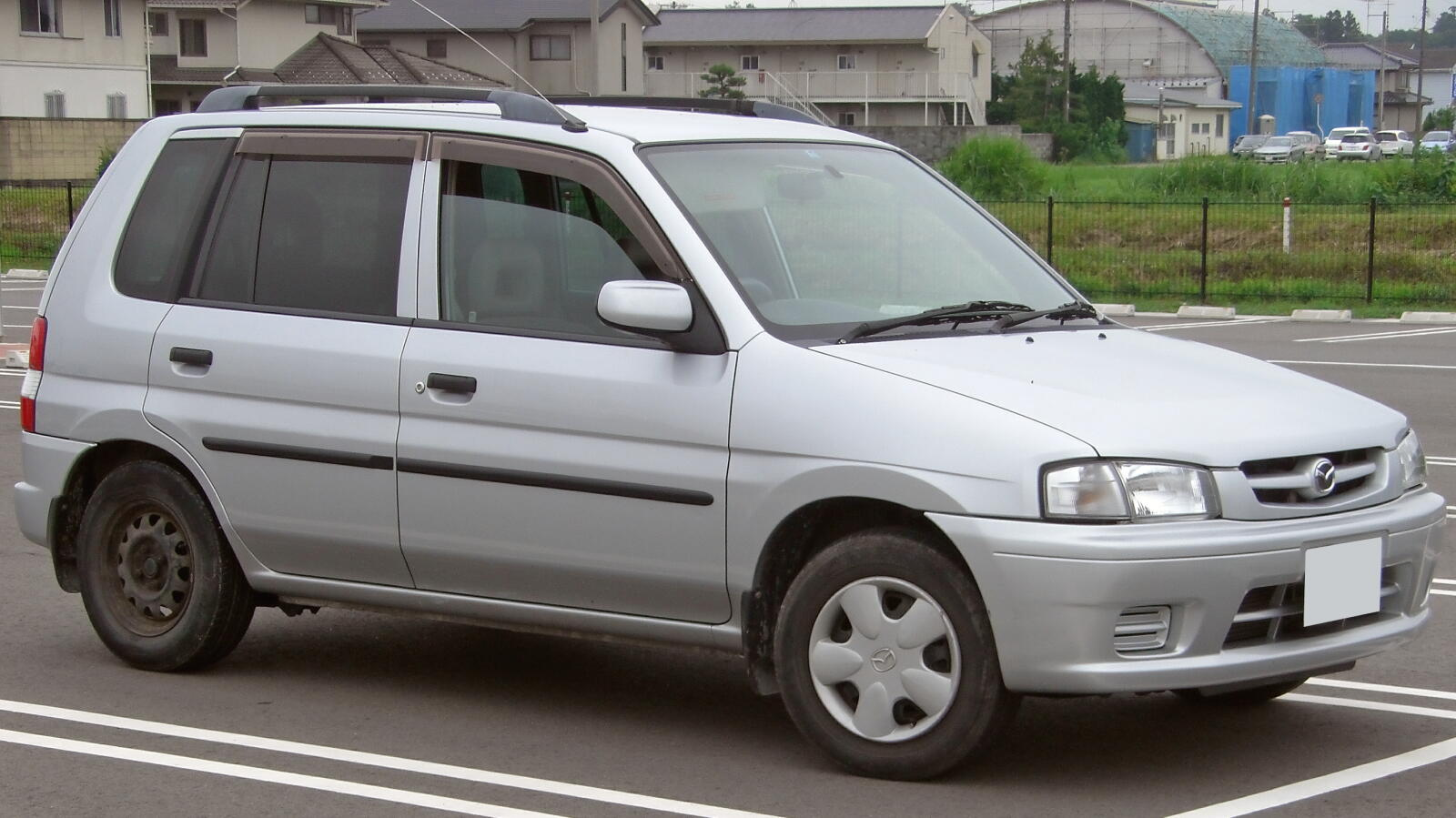
1998–1999 Mazda Demio (Japan; pre-facelift)

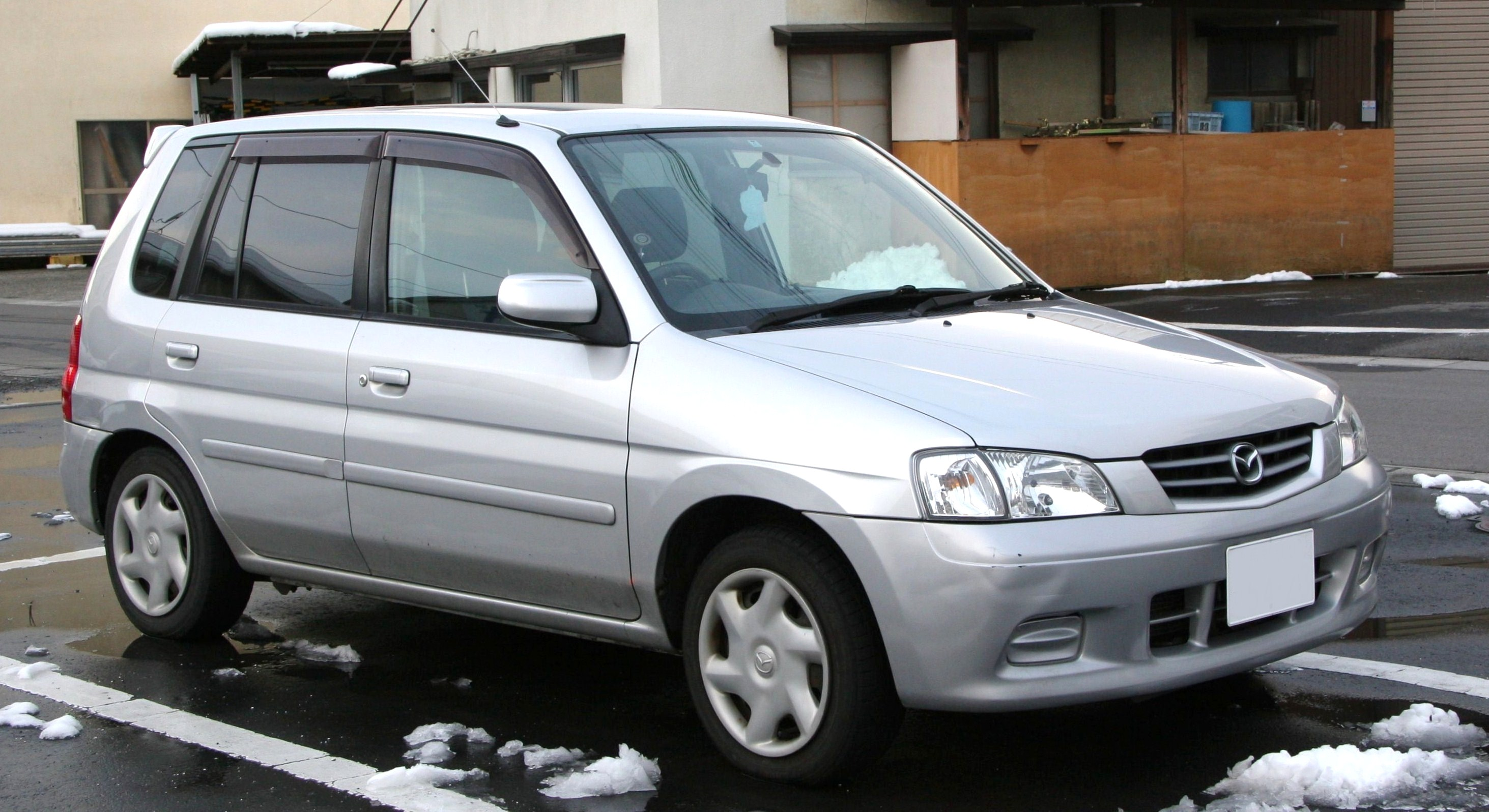
1999–2002 Mazda Demio (Japan; facelift)

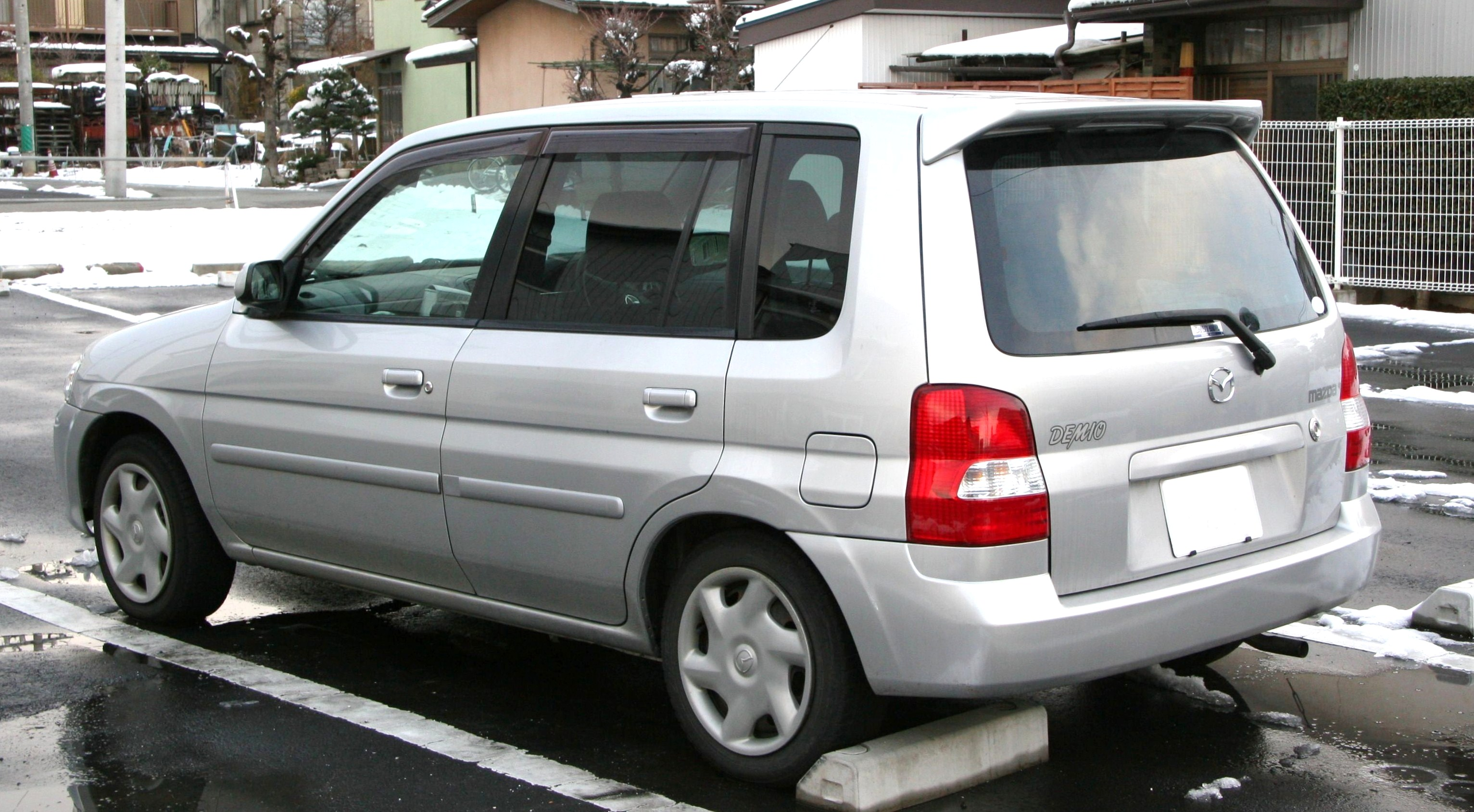
1999–2002 Mazda Demio (Japan; facelift)

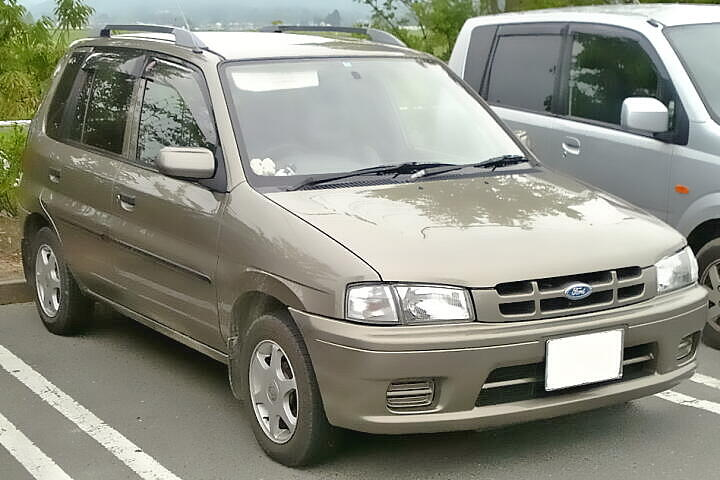
1996 Ford Festiva Mini Wagon

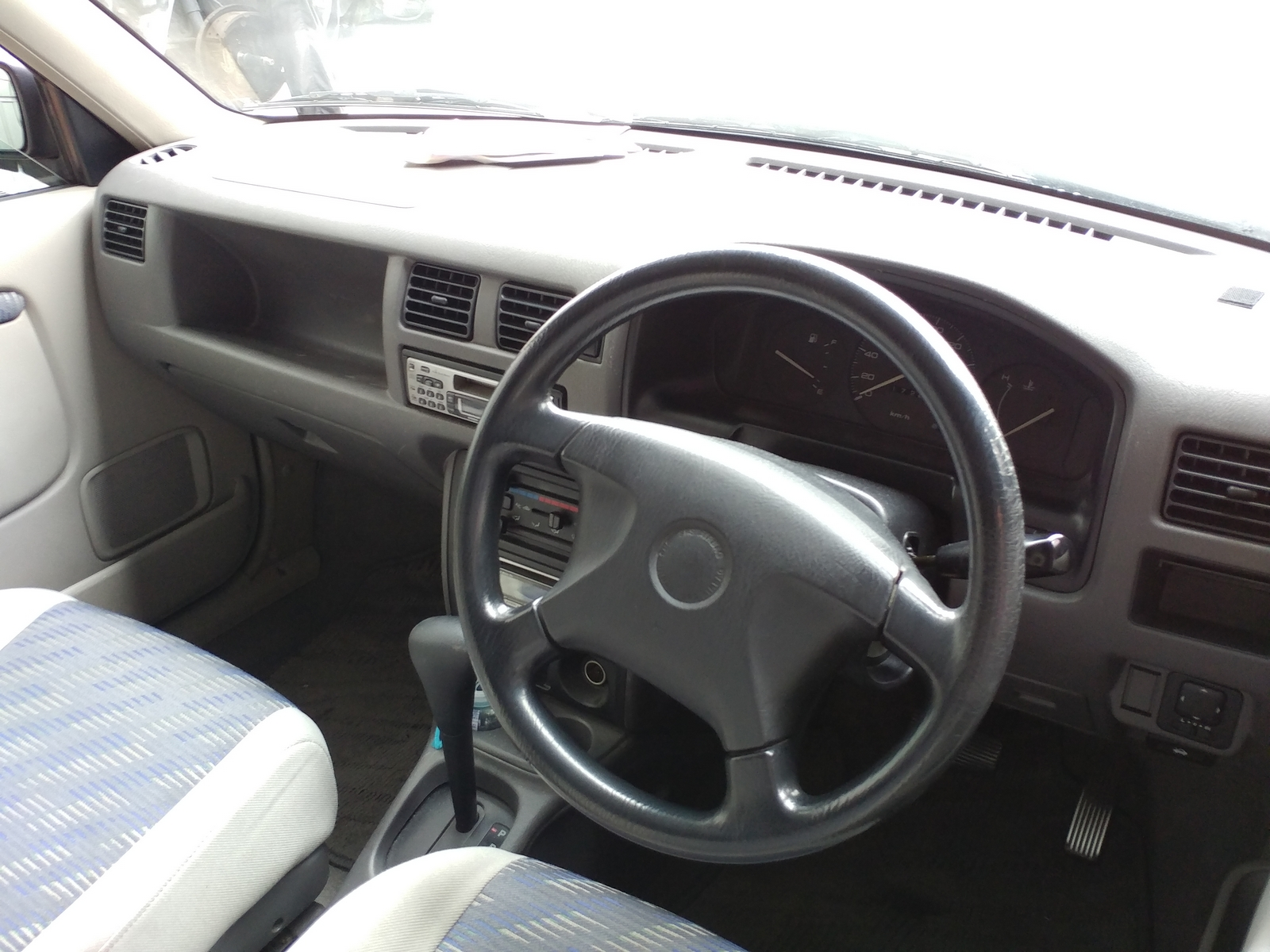
Interior (Japan; pre-facelift)

== Second to fourth generation (2002–2019) ==
Beginning with the 2002 second generation Demio, export models received "Mazda2" badging. The third generation appeared in early 2007, followed by a fourth generation in September 2014. Mazda continued to call the car Demio in its home market (and some select export markets) until the nameplate was retired in favor of the global moniker in September 2019.

=== Gallery ===
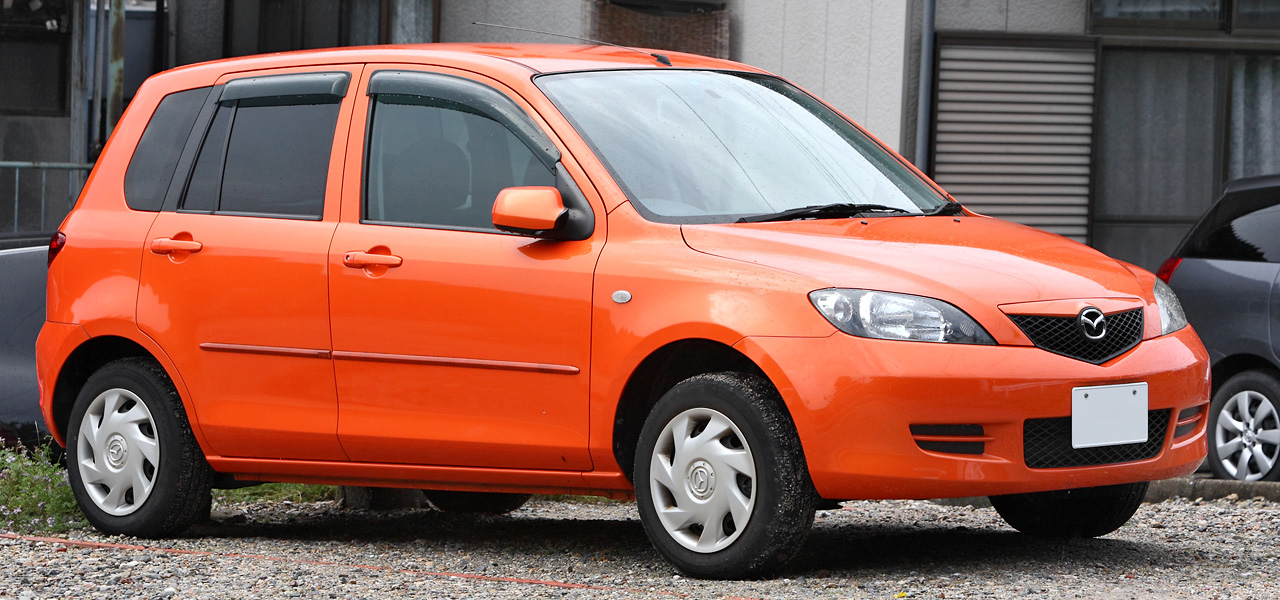
Second generation Mazda Demio

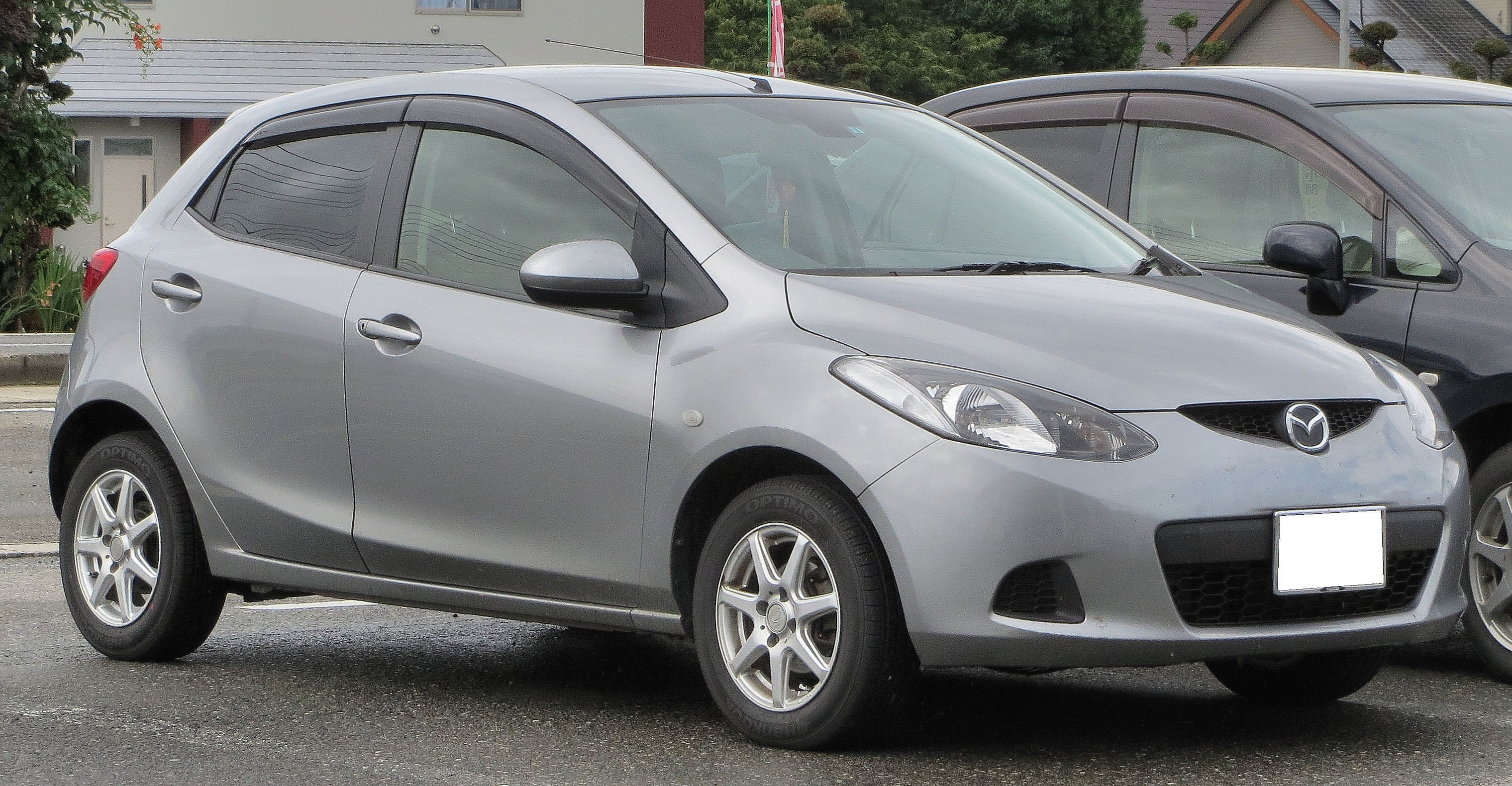
Third generation Mazda Demio

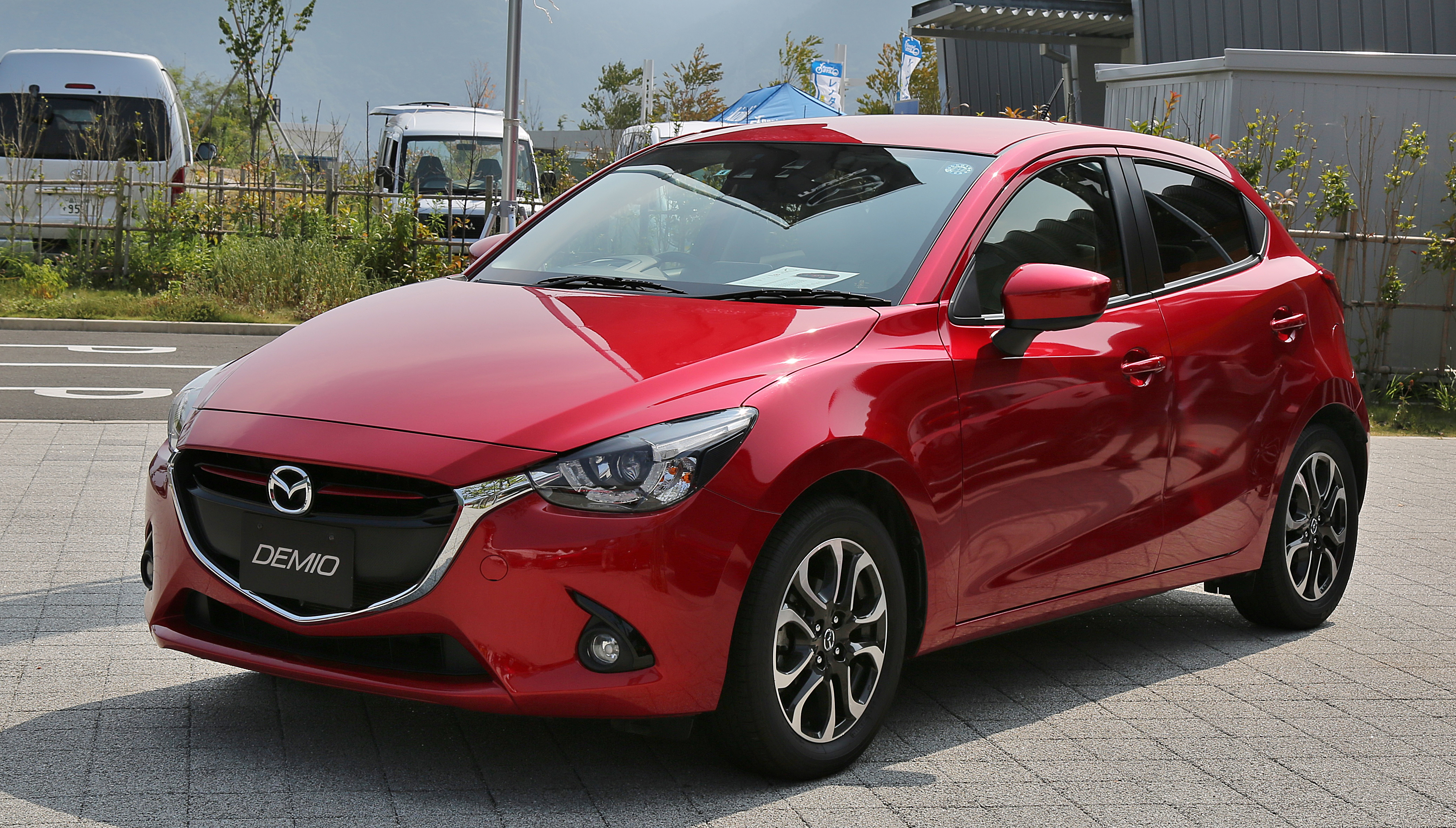
Fourth generation Mazda Demio
