= Organized retail crime =

Criminal enterprises targeting retail establishments

Organized retail crime (ORC) refers to professional criminal enterprises ranging from regional gangs to international crime rings and other organized crime focusing on retail environments. Operations can include truckjacking, shoplifting, smash and grab, cargo theft, and cargo diversion. One person acting alone is generally not considered an example of organized retail crime. Working in teams, some may create distractions while others steal items judiciously, indiscriminately or violently. Often, they are stocking up on specified items at the request of a leader. It is not uncommon for ORC operations to involve accomplices working in the retail store or corporation.

The FBI estimated in 2010 that the losses attributed to organized retail crime were as high as $30 billion a year.

== United Kingdom ==
In the UK, respondents to the British Retail Consortium's annual crime survey for the financial year 2013-2014 estimated that organized retail crime accounted for 40% of all shop thefts.

== Canada ==
The Retail Council of Canada claimed in 2023 that organized retail crime "costs Canadians retailers around $5 billion per year."

== Australia ==
The National Retail Association says: "Individuals are often assumed to be working alone when shoplifting however, commonly they are not working alone but with others who create distractions whilst goods are stolen, in order to meet the requirements of the crime ring leader".

== United States ==
According to the Retail Industry Leaders Association (RILA), theft had risen to $70 billion in 2020. A pattern emerged of crime rings consisting of two parts—persons who would steal a high volume of goods from multiple stores, and others who would sell the stolen goods, sometimes via online marketplaces, converting them into cash. Walmart and Amazon posted banners on their websites asking their customers to report products for sale on other sites that they believed to have been stolen, in line with a new U.S. law that went into effect in June 2023.

However, the National Retail Federation (NRF) said that same month that the effect of theft on retailers' bottom lines was about the same as in previous years, with total levels of shrink at $112 billion in 2022 (1.55% of sales), up from $93.9 billion (1.44% of sales) in 2021. External theft, including organized retail crime, consistently accounted for around 36% of lost inventory per year between 2015 and 2023. Other contributors were employee/internal theft (29%), and process/control failures (26%). The NRF claimed in a widely cited 2023 report that organized retail crime accounted for nearly half of all inventory losses reported by retailers in 2021. The estimate was later retracted after a report by trade publication Retail Dive found that the estimate was based on faulty data.

In 2023, Nordstrom, Macy's, and Old Navy all publicized major organized shoplifting activity; some branches of major chains were closed, and Target claimed that rising theft helped drive its $500 million decrease in annual profits. Target said its claim of increased theft was based on several signals including recent criminal-justice reforms, news reports about increased crime, comments about increased theft from other retailers, and documented increases in violence and fraud. However, levels of shrink in retail stores have remained roughly consistent over time, with no clear method to determine how much is caused by external theft. Retail Dive has found that the overall level of shrink stayed between 1% and 2% from 2015 to 2022. Despite corporations such as Target, CVS, and Walgreens publicly suggesting that retail theft was the major reason for store closures, shoplifting decreased in most major U.S. cities between 2019 and 2023.

From 2022 through August 2023, 9 U.S. states passed laws to impose harsher penalties for organized retail crime offenses. California made organized retail theft a distinct crime. In 2024, California lawmakers proposed expanding penalties for individuals involved in organized retail theft.

=== Noted incidents ===
In early 2008 in Florida, a single shoplifting investigation turned up a massive organized enterprise. Operating for at least five years, criminals had stolen up to $100 million in medicine, health and beauty goods.

Texas FBI agents pulled over a rental truck, leading them to $2.7 million in stolen assets. The goods included $1 million in stolen baby formula that was stored in rodent-infested garages with no temperature control.

In January 2013, in Pennsylvania, West York Police (York County) announced the arrest of over 130 people and the organizer of a major organized retail crime ring in which the individuals targeted over 90 stores at over 300 locations in 5 counties in Pennsylvania and 2 counties in northern Maryland, with an estimated loss to retailers at $1 million.

In December 2023, husband and wife Kenneth and Michelle Mack were arrested in the San Diego area on charges of operating a retail crime empire centered on shoplifting. The Macks resold cosmetics worth $8 million, stolen by a dozen women from Ulta, Sephora and other stores, on Amazon. In July 2024, the Macks pleaded guilty to organized retail theft and conspiring to commit organized retail theft. They were each sentenced to five years and four months in prison and required to pay $3 million in restitution.

=== Legislation ===
On 15 July 2008, Reps. Brad Ellsworth, D-Indiana, and Jim Jordan, R-Ohio, introduced the Organized Retail Crime Act of 2008 that would make it a felony to engage in activities that further organized retail crime. Specific and narrow obligations upon on-line marketplaces known to be used by high-volume sellers of stolen merchandise are also included to benefit legitimate online businesses.

On 1 August 2008, Sen. Dick Durbin, D-Ill. introduced the Combating Organized Retail Crime Act of 2008 that would give law enforcement the ability to prosecute, among other things.

In January 2023, Sen. Chuck Grassley, R-Iowa, and Sen. Catherine Cortez Masto, D-Nevada, introduced the Combating Organized Retail Crime Act (S. 140), which would update current federal criminal penalties related to organized retail crime and establish a new law enforcement coordination center within Homeland Security Investigations at the Department of Homeland Security to improve coordination between federal, state and local law enforcement agencies. Companion legislation was introduced later in 2023 in the House of Representatives (H.R. 895), sponsored by Reps. Ken Buck, David P. Joyce, Susie Lee and Dina Titus is co-sponsored by nearly 70 other representatives. In April 2025, Reps. David Joyce and Susie Lee introduced H.R. 2853, a broader version of the legislation. This legislation is supported by the International Council of Shopping Centers and other retail industry groups. On January 13, 2026, the House Committee on the Judiciary passed the bill by voice vote, and on May 12, 2026, the full House passed the bill under suspension. As of the date of House passage, the bill had 206 bipartisan cosponsors. Sens. Chuck Grassley and Catherine Cortez Masto introduced the Senate version, which has 49 cosponsors as of September 2026.

== Multi-national crime ==
Some criminal organizations are multi-national (or trans-national) with operations in and between several different countries. ACAMS, Largest International Financial Crime Prevention Community Worldwide, has said: "Organized retail crime (ORC) is a low-risk, high-reward business line for transnational criminal organizations' portfolios, that presents a significant financial and public safety risk". They indicate that one type of operation is for criminal operatives to smuggle destitute people into a country and have them pay for their transport by conducting directed retail shop lifting, often moving from city to city.
