= Autozam Clef =

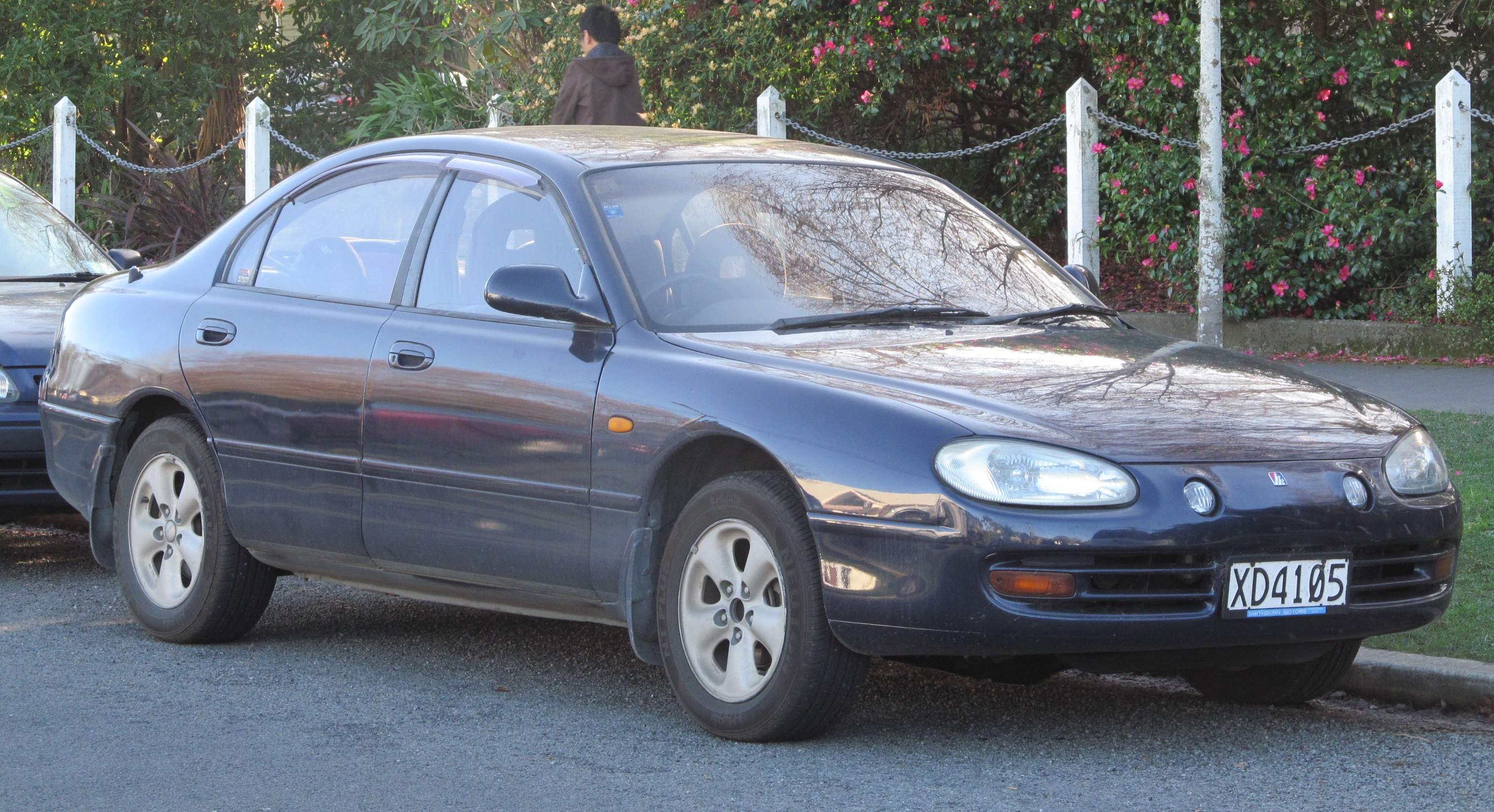

Overview
- Manufacturer: Autozam (Mazda)
- Production: May 1992 – December 1994
- Assembly: Japan: Hiroshima, Hofu
- Designer: Yasuo Aoyagi (1989)

Body and chassis
- Class: Mid-size car
- Body style: 4-door sedan
- Layout: Transverse front-engine, front-wheel drive Transverse front-engine, four-wheel drive
- Platform: Mazda GE platform
- Related: Mazda 626/Cronos ɛ̃fini MS-6

Powertrain
- Engine: gasoline: 2.0 L FS-DE I4; 2.0 L KF-ZE V6; 2.5 L KL-ZE V6
- Transmission: 4-speed automatic

Dimensions
- Wheelbase: 2,610 mm (102.8 in)
- Length: 4,670 mm (183.9 in)
- Width: 1,750 mm (68.9 in)
- Height: 1,400 mm (55.1 in)
- Curb weight: 1,310 kg (2,888 lb)

The Autozam Clef is a mid-size sedan that was built by Mazda for their Autozam sales channel from May 1992 until December 1994.

== Description ==
It shared Mazda's GE platform with cars like the ɛ̃fini MS-6 and Mazda MX-6 coupé. The word "clef" is a musical notation, and Mazda chose it to signify that the Clef was meant to serve as a reference point by which other Autozam products would become to be known or regarded as. The Clef was mechanically related to the Mazda Cronos (626 in global markets), but featured different bodywork, and rear side window designs. The front end in particular was designed to have the Autozam corporate "face", reminiscent of the Carol and Revue.

The Clef had the same width dimensions as the Mazda Cronos which shared the engine lineup. Engine size and exterior dimensions have particular significance in Japan, due to dimension regulations, where Japanese consumers pay an additional annual tax for larger vehicles as well as higher road tax obligations. The Clef was Autozam's first car to exceed the compact car dimensions. The front-wheel drive Clef was only offered with a four-speed automatic transmission; the base 2.0 was also available with four-wheel drive.

== In the market ==
As the Clef was the top level sedan at Autozam, which was introduced as a retailer of entry level products to Japanese consumers, the width dimension presented an issue in that buyers in Japan were liable for yearly taxes, and because the Clef was largely identical to other Mazda GE platform cars, Japanese buyers who were willing to pay extra taxes for a wide car from Mazda had many choices and the Clef wasn't usually the first choice. Additionally, Autozam mostly targeted young, female customers, who were unlikely to trade up from the subcompact Revue and Carol to the expensive Clef. The car's grilleless fascia was more cute than prestigious or sporty, further harming sales. Late in the production run, a version with a redesigned front bumper incorporating a grille was introduced. Called the Clef Limited-X, it was only offered for a short while and was built in very small numbers.

Of all Autozam products sold at the time, only the Clef exceeded the width dimension stipulation; other Autozam products were either kei class vehicles or supermini products.
