= Autozam =

Brand of automobiles

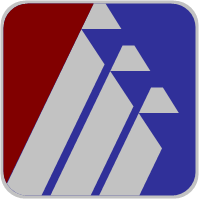
- Type: Division
- Industry: Automotive
- Founded: 1989
- Defunct: 1998
- Fate: Defunct
- Headquarters: Hiroshima, Japan
- Area served: Japan
- Products: Automobiles
- Parent: Mazda

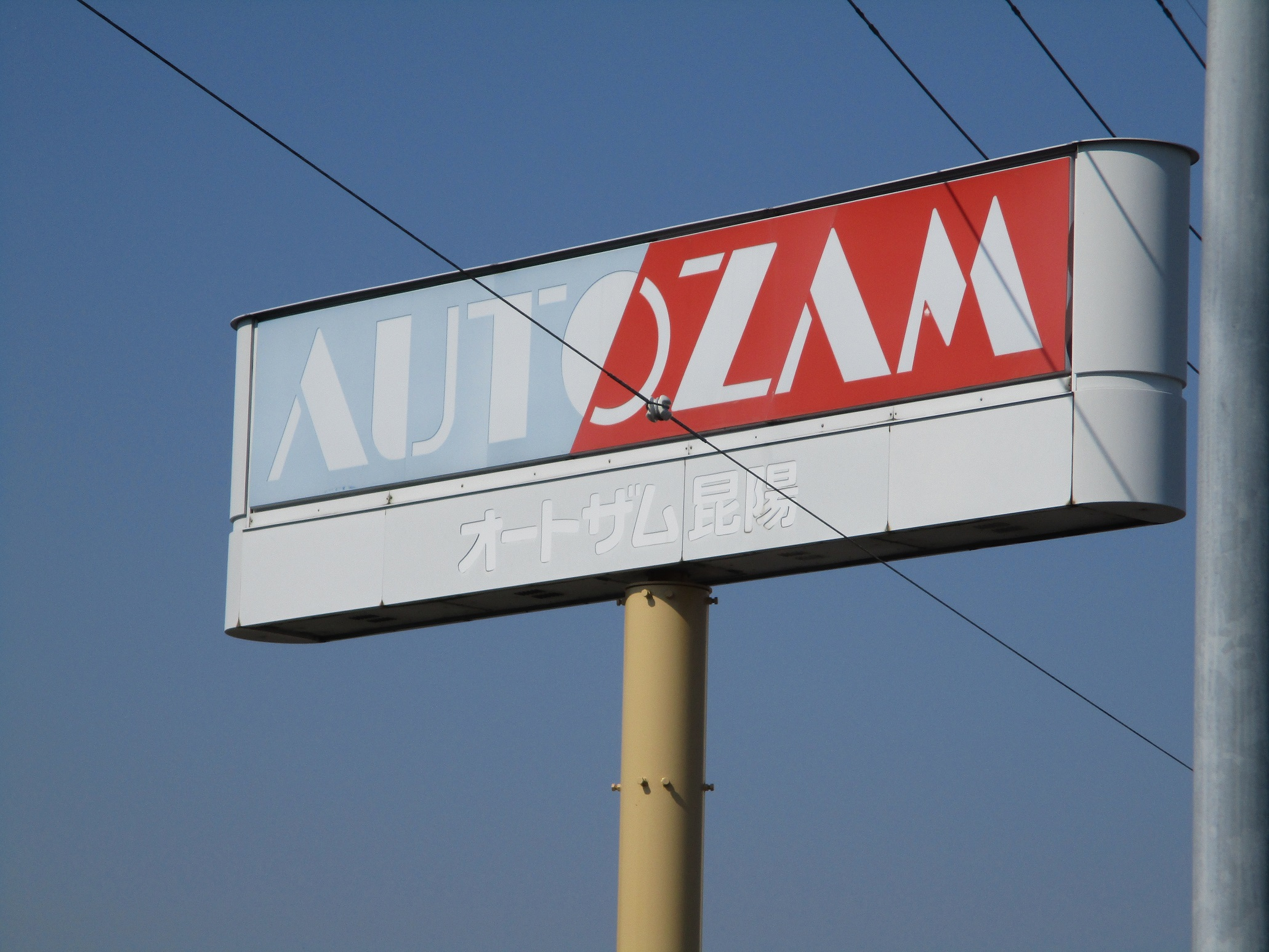
Autozam sign

Autozam (オートザム, Ōtozamu) was a brand of Japanese automaker Mazda, specializing in small cars and Kei cars, many of which were rebadged Suzuki models. Autozam also briefly acted as importer of Lancia vehicles to Japan.

The Autozam dealership channel is still in operation in some Japanese locations, but sell all current Mazda products.

== Overview ==
In the late 1980s, Mazda began expansion of dealerships in Japan. The idea was to create "a familiar car shop in your city" (あなたの街の身近なカーショップ; Anata no machi no midjikana kāshoppu) and network of dealerships, centred around small and medium-sized maintenance shops and used car dealers. In part of this brand strategy, Mazda launched of three new marques. The company created Autozam, Eunos, and ɛ̃fini, in addition to the Mazda and Ford brands already marketed there. The name came from "automobile" and the first three letters of "Mazda" spelt backwards.

Autozam's lineup - at the time of establishment - was centered on small cars (i.e. Kei cars and compacts). Autozam's first flagship model was the Autozam Clef, a sedan of Mazda Cronos lineage.

In addition, Mazda acquired the official import rights of Lancia for the purpose of supplementing the luxury car lineup. At the same time, Garage Italya also imported and sold Lancias through its own sales network. Lancia and Autobianchi brand passenger cars manufactured by the Italian Fiat Auto, such as the Lancia Thema, Lancia Delta and Autobianchi Y10, were also on sale.

The nationwide sales network was controlled by "Autozam Co., Ltd." and a regional wholesale company (Autozam Co., Ltd.).

Autozam's first sales hit was the second-generation Carol, which became popular with young female buyers, partly due to targeted advertising. The Revue and Clef models ended up redesigned to follow the character of the much successful Carol. However, the sales of Revue and Clef ended up being disastrously sluggish, as they were completely unpopular except for a few young female users.

Some of the light sports cars, such as Autozam AZ-1 and the small specialty car Autozam AZ-3 were also critically and publicly applauded, but did not translate to good sales. For short time, Autozam imported Lancia cars to Japan as a high-margin luxury car line. Lancia sales too were disappointing, as Japanese import buyers did not like buying their cars from showrooms sharing space with the cheerful and cute Autozam Carol.

As a result, there was no Autozam product that was profitable except for the second generation Carol. Even the future Carol models were not as popular as the 2nd generation because it became a half-finished retro-feature concept with a slightly regressed fancy flavor when it was fully remodelled in the 3rd generation.

Among the Mazda 5 channel dealers, where the core model Cronos ended in a big failure, only the éfini RX-7 was really popular. The sales of the best-selling Ford Festiva plummeted after the full model change, as with Autozam Carol. Autozam had become seriously unprofitable, even more so than the Eunos store, which only product was the Eunos Roadster. This caused the management of the Mazda headquarters to be severely distressed.

== Transition to "Mazda Autozam store" ==
Of the marquees created by Mazda - the so-called 5-channel system - Autozam name was one of the few that survived. But in 1998, certain standards were set for the dealership size and sales of Autozam stores nationwide.

The dealerships were changed to "Mazda Autozam store" and started selling the products under the parent company Mazda name. At first, these dealerships mainly sold the Familia, Bongo and the Premacy. In addition, the Mazda-Autozam dealerships started OEM sales of Suzuki automobiles.

During the channel reorganization period, the Autozam store, which could not be transferred to the Mazda Autozam store, handled only light cars and Demio with the sign as it was, but as new models, AZ-Offroad and Laputa are sold together with the Mazda Autozam store.

After these two cars, new models were no longer introduced to the "Autozam store", and in order to handle the new models after that, it was necessary to move to the Mazda Autozam store.

Stores that did not meet the standards returned their dealership rights without being given the right to sell new models. As a result, by the early 2000s, about 900 Autozam stores had changed to 350 Mazda Autozam stores.

In addition, Lancia's regular import rights were returned by 1998. In 2001, Autozam Co., Ltd. and a regional wholesale company merged to form "Mazda Autozam Co., Ltd.", and one company nationwide controlled the sales network.

After that, we started handling Axela in 2003 and MPV, Tribute, and Bongo Friendee in March 2004. Other Mazda channels (Mazda store, Mazda éfini store) are now handling Carol Spiano, AZ-Wagon, and Scrum, which were exclusive to Autozam, and the differentiation from other sales channels has disappeared.

From April 2016, we will start handling Atenza, Roadster, Familia Van, and Titan, which are the top models of Mazda vehicles that have not been sold so far. As a result, although the name of the Mazda Autozam store remains, it has become a de facto unification of domestic sales channels. As a result, "Mazda Autozam Co., Ltd." has suspended its operations, and Mazda itself and the Mazda éfini and Mazda stores in each region will supervise and manage the nationwide sales network.

== Autozam models ==
The following vehicles were part of the Autozam brand. Those that were rebadged versions are noted in parentheses.

- 1990–1998 Autozam Carol keicar (rebodied Suzuki Alto)
- 1990–1994 Autozam Revue subcompact car (Mazda 121)
- 1990–1997 Autozam Scrum mini MPV (Suzuki Carry)
- 1991–1998 Autozam AZ-3 coupé (Mazda MX-3)
- 1992–1993 Autozam Clef sedan (Mazda Cronos)
- 1992–1994 Autozam AZ-1 mid-engine sports car (Suzuki Cara)
- 1994–1997 Autozam AZ-Wagon station wagon (Suzuki Wagon R, later sold as a Mazda)

The Mazda AZ-Wagon continued to use the "AZ" name until 2003, while the Mazda AZ-Offroad mini SUV (a rebadged Suzuki Jimny) was introduced in 1998, continuing to carry on Autozam's naming conventions.

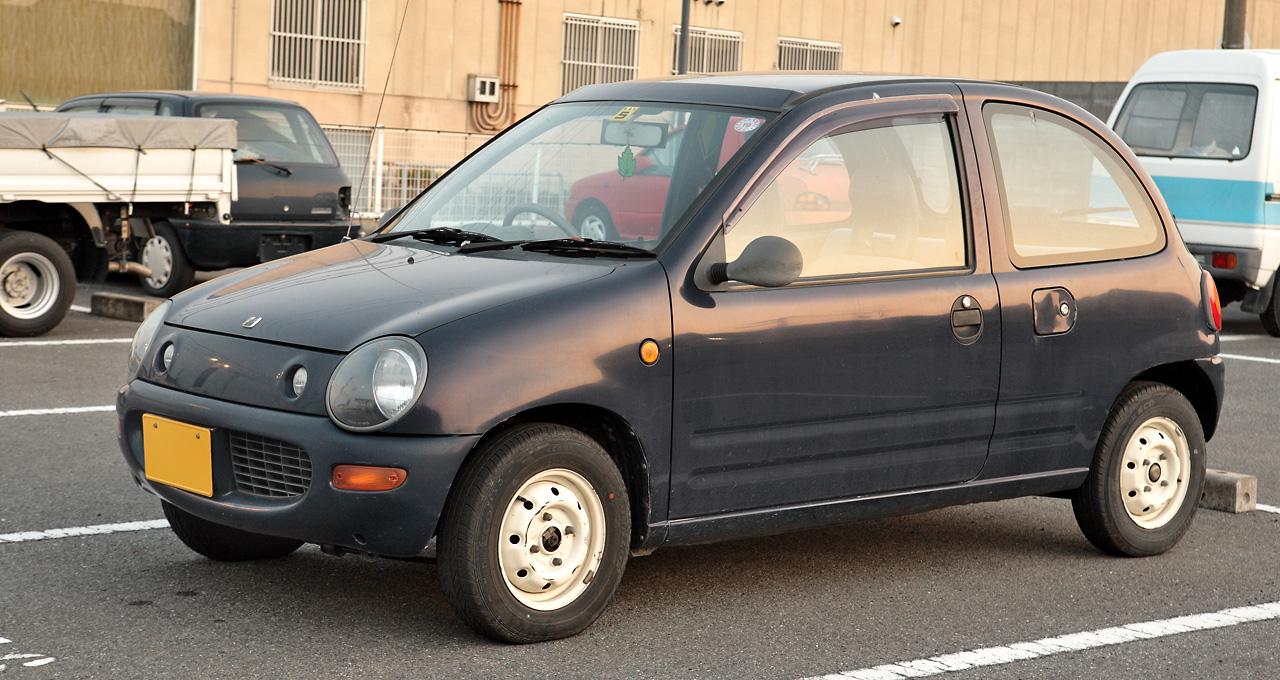
Autozam Carol

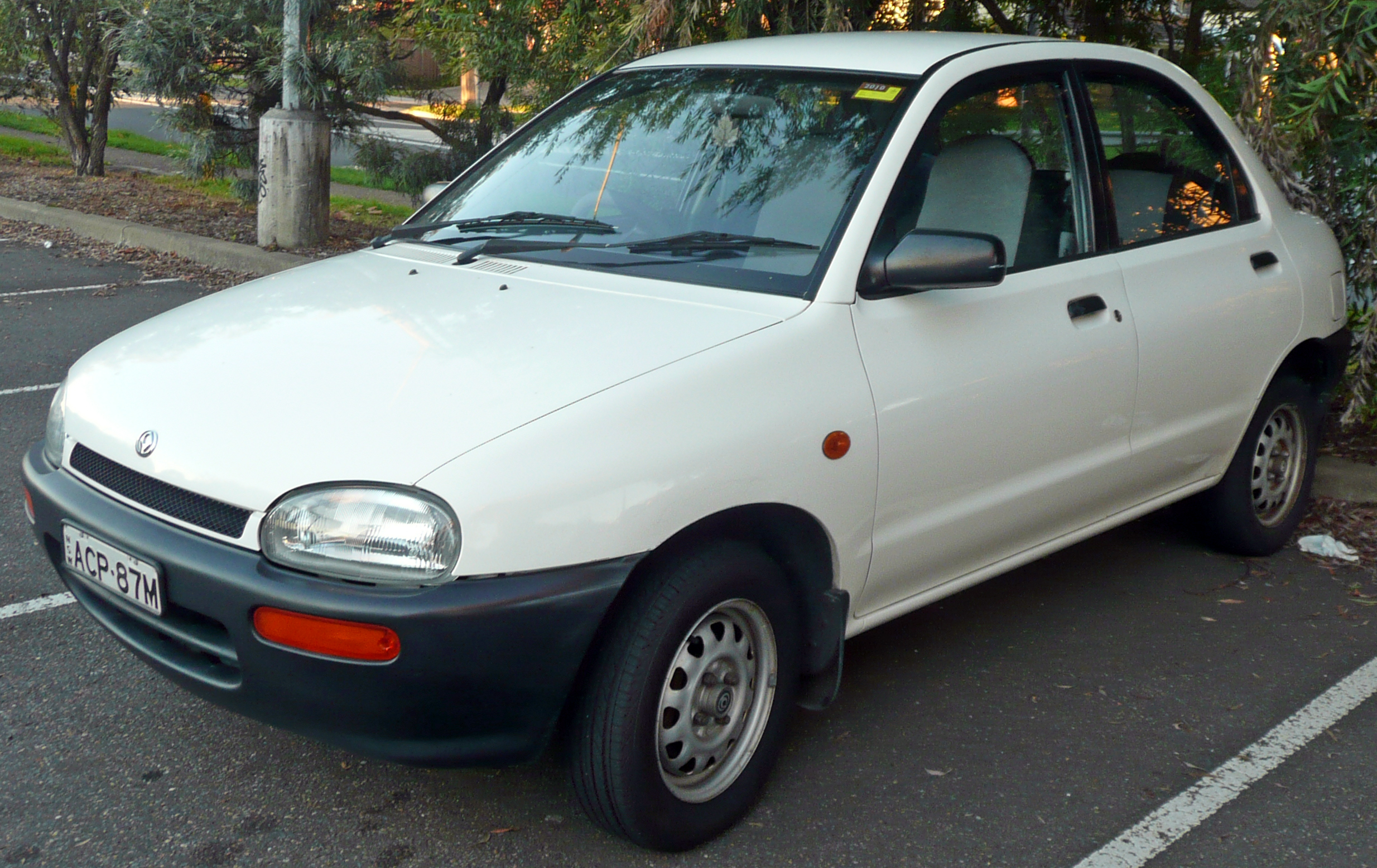
Autozam Revue

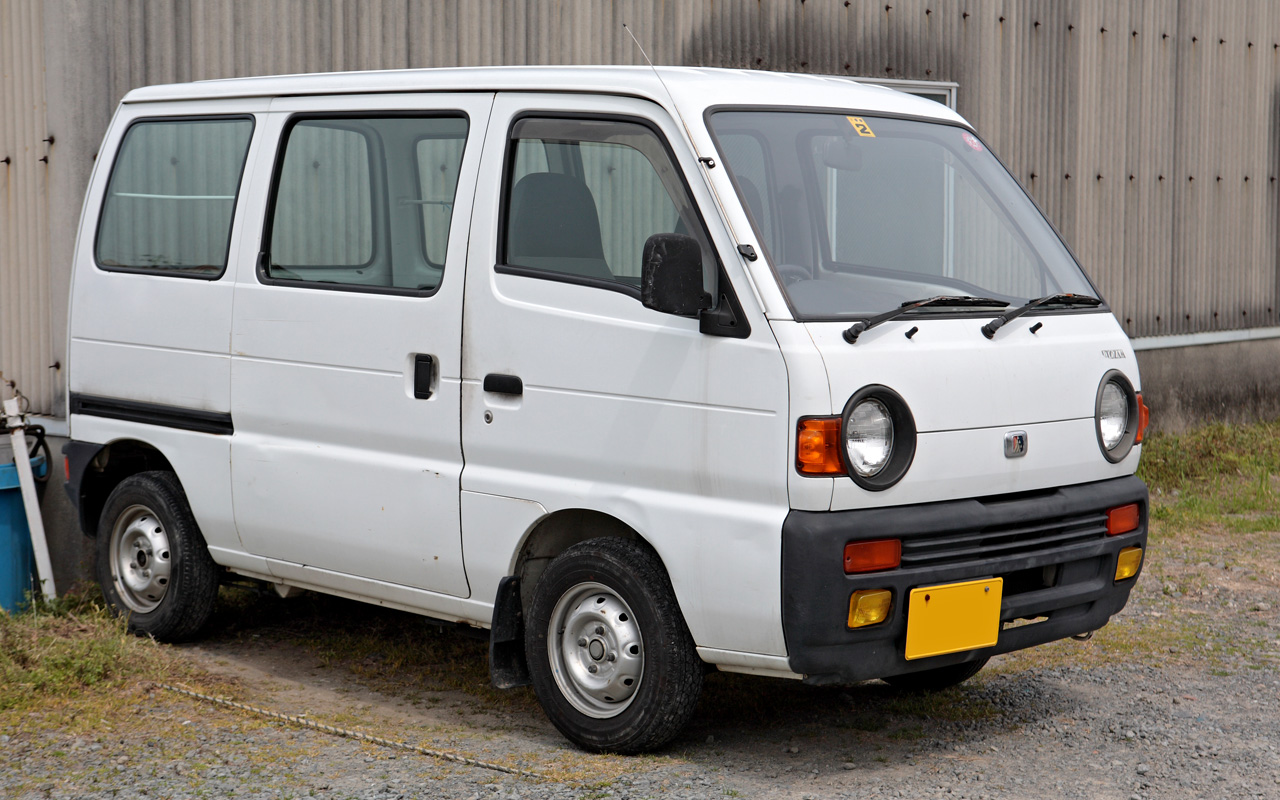
Autozam Scrum

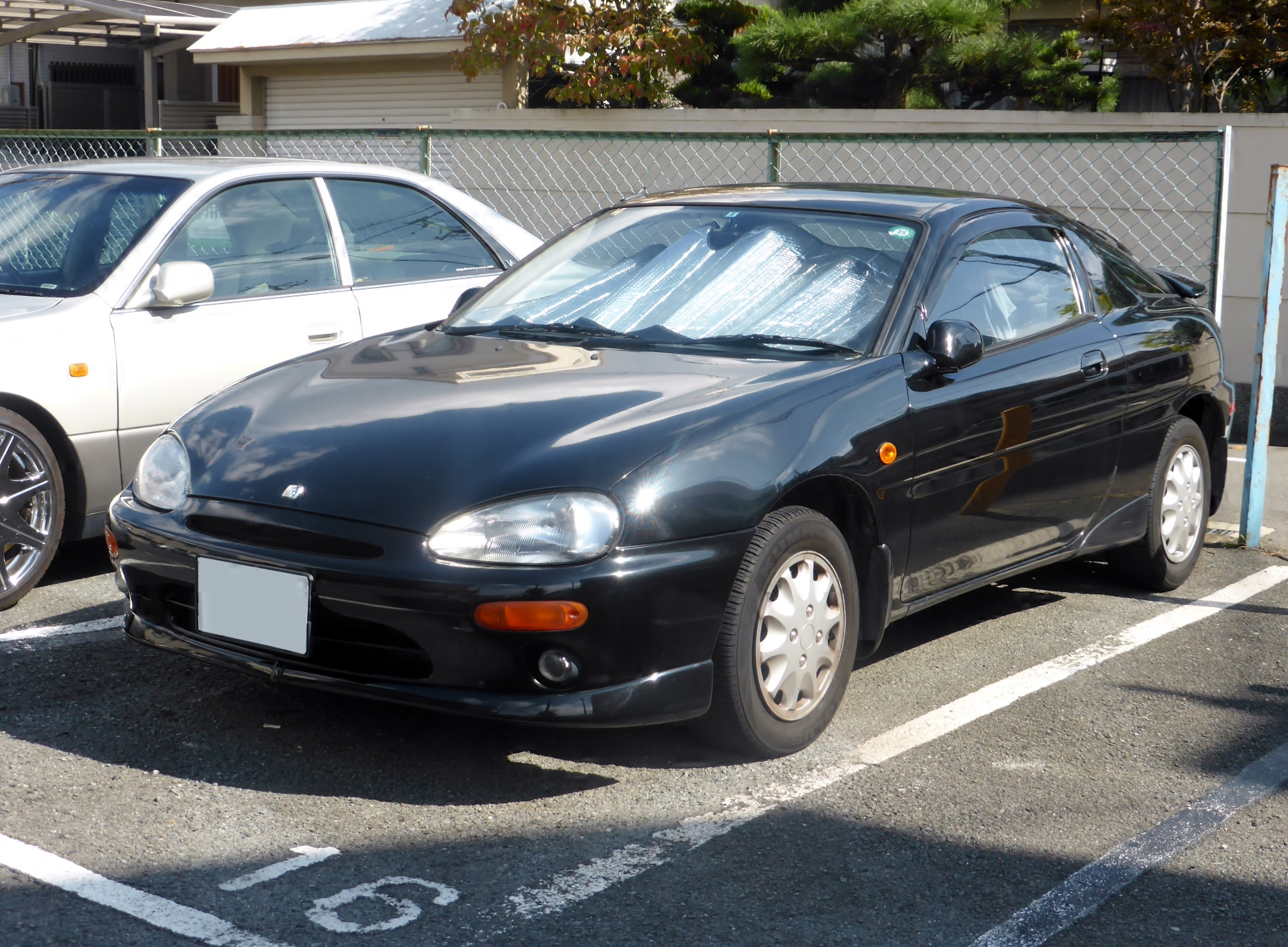
Autozam AZ-3

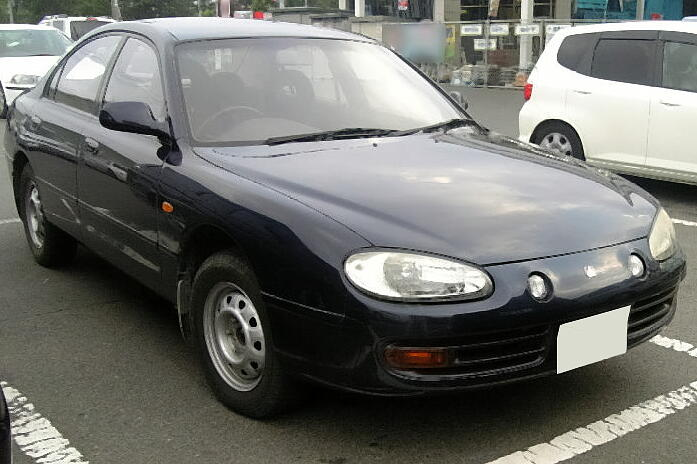
Autozam Clef

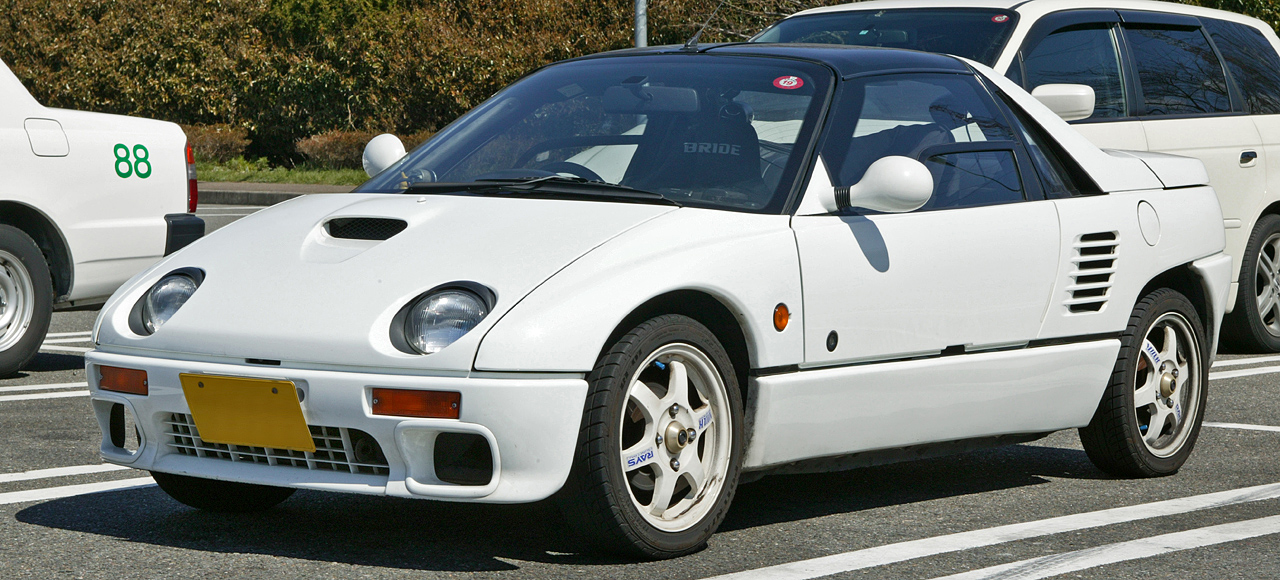
Autozam AZ-1

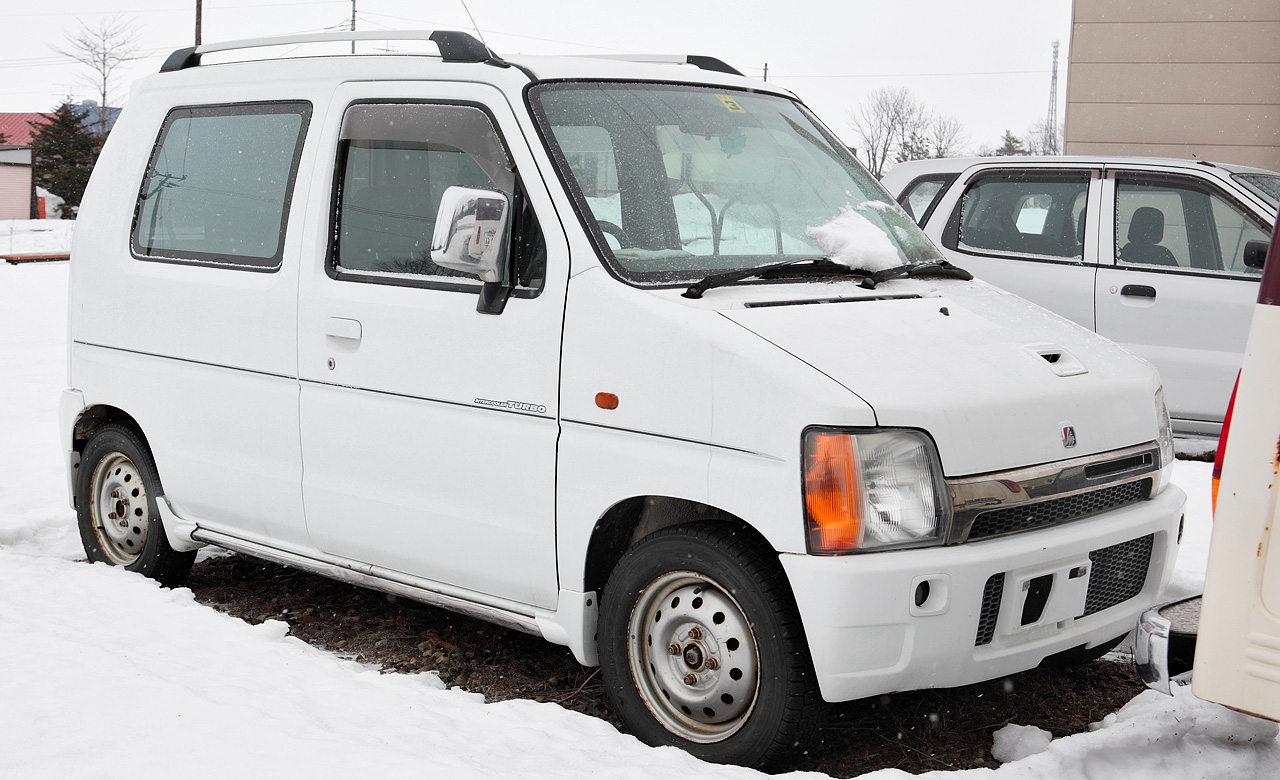
AZ-Wagon

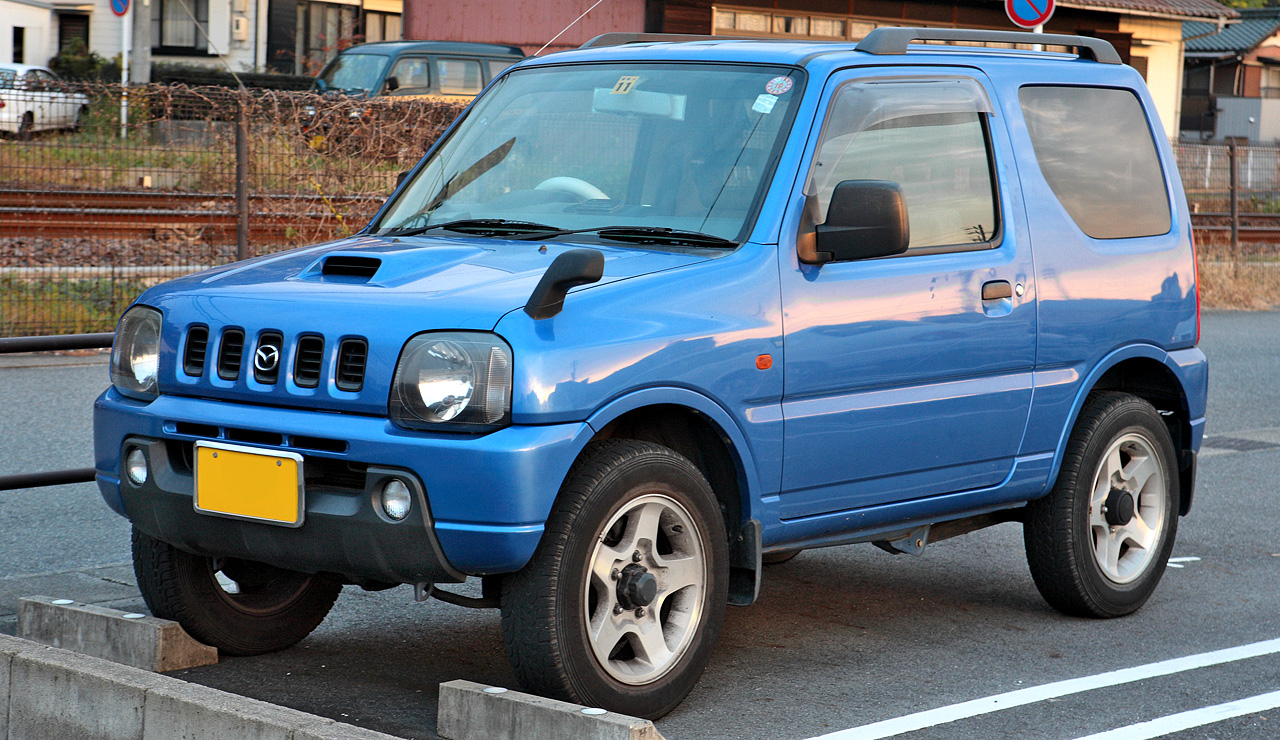
Mazda AZ-Offroad

== Lancia imports ==
Autozam locations also briefly sold Lancia products to Japanese buyers. The vehicles sold are listed below. Of the Lancia products sold, only the top level Thema didn't comply with Japanese Government exterior and engine displacement regulations to encourage sales, giving Japanese buyers who visited Autozam locations an alternative to the Autozam Clef, which also exceeded width dimensions.

=== Lancia models ===
- Lancia Thema
- Lancia Dedra
- Lancia Delta
- Lancia Prisma
- Lancia Y10
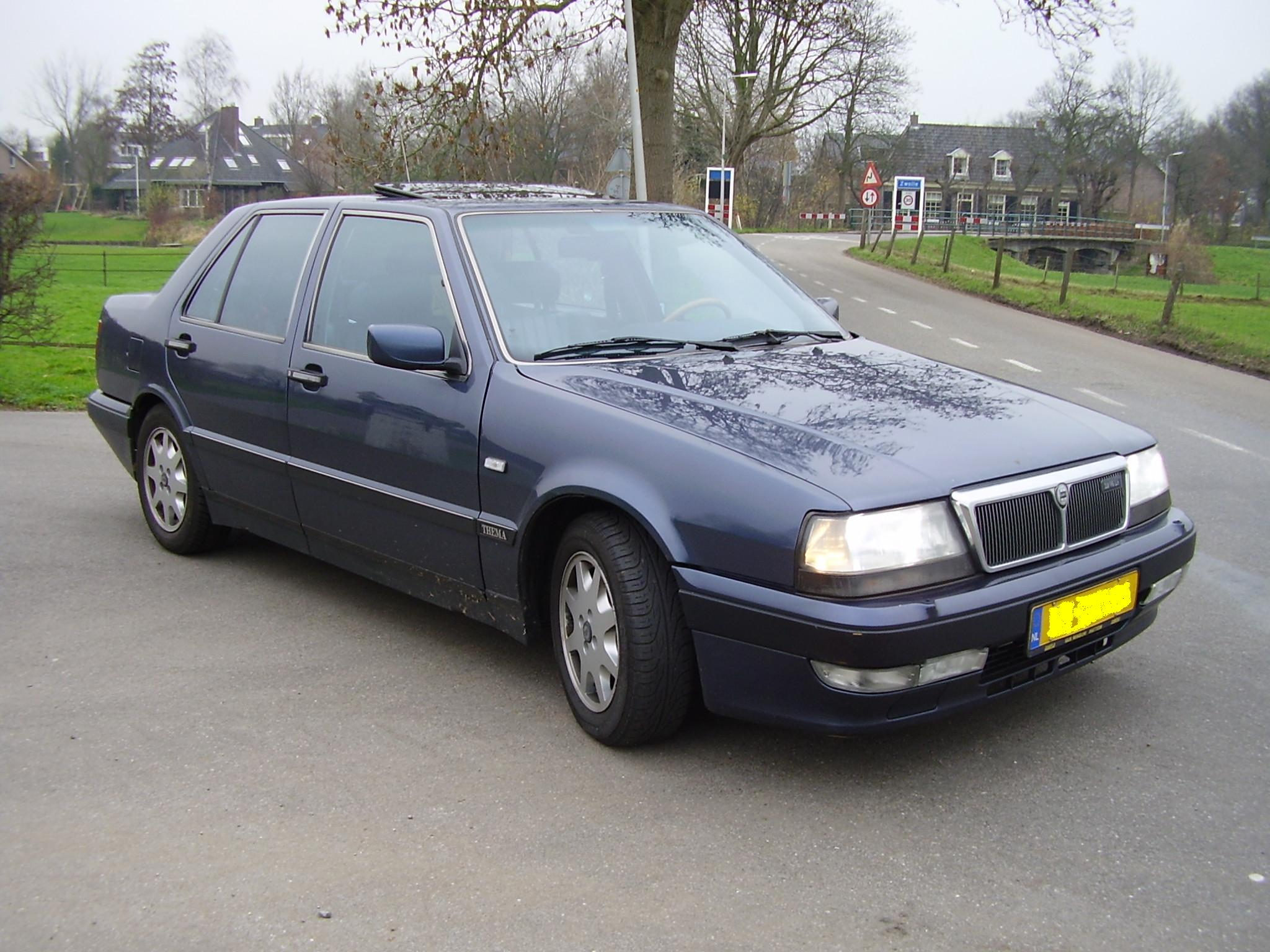
Lancia Thema

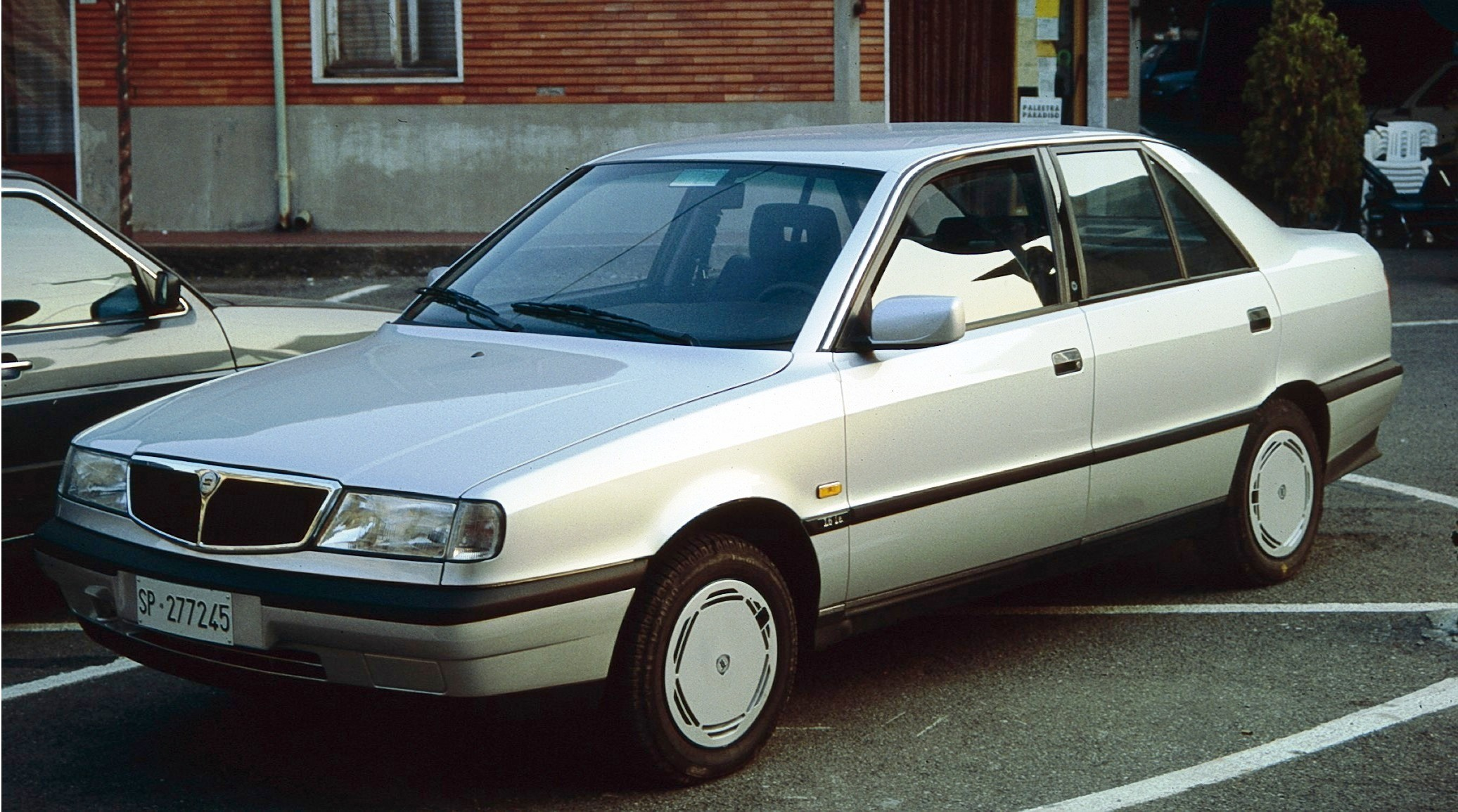
Lancia Dedra

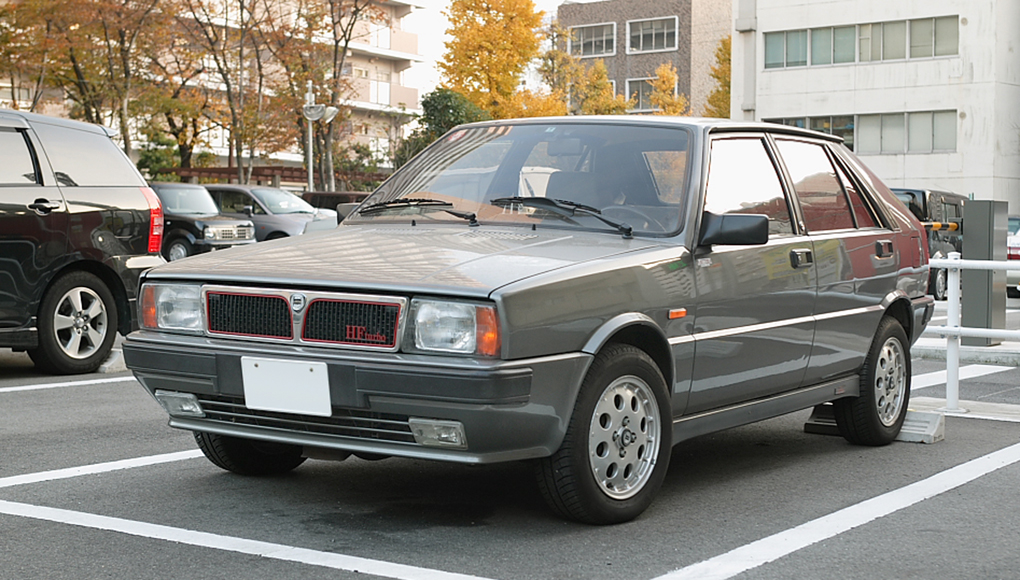
Lancia Delta

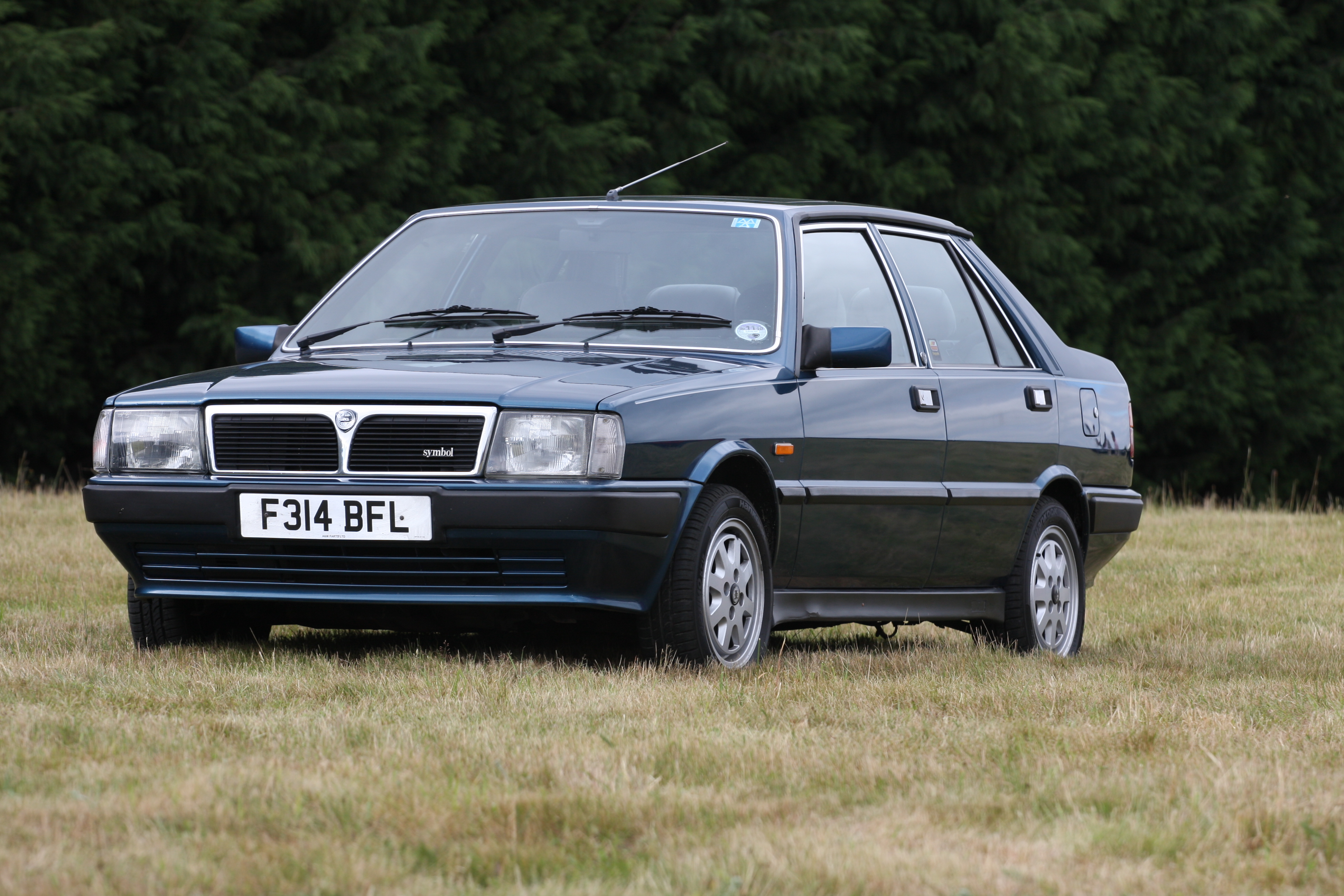
Lancia Prisma

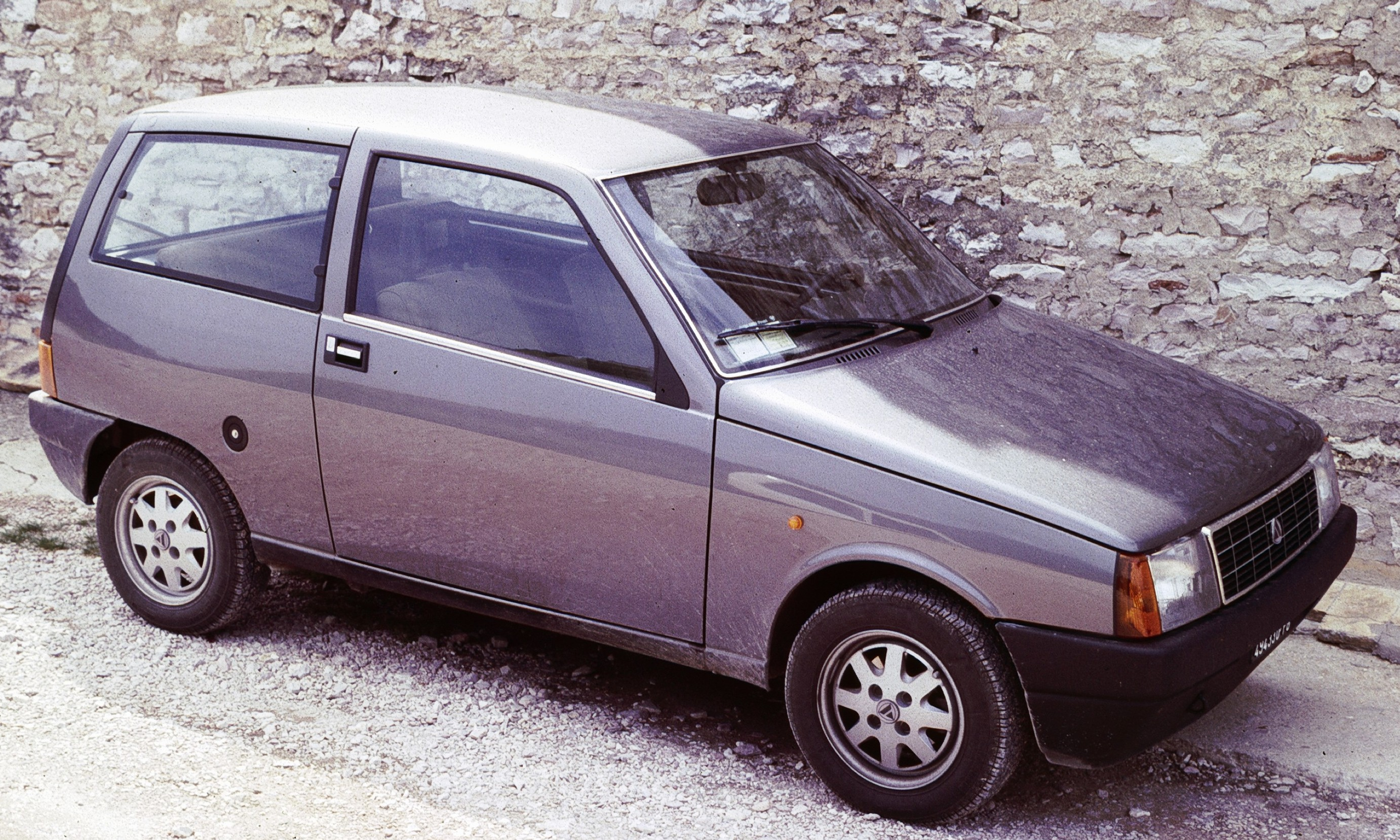
Lancia Y10
