= Mazda Carol =

Kei car

Mazda Carol Autozam Carol
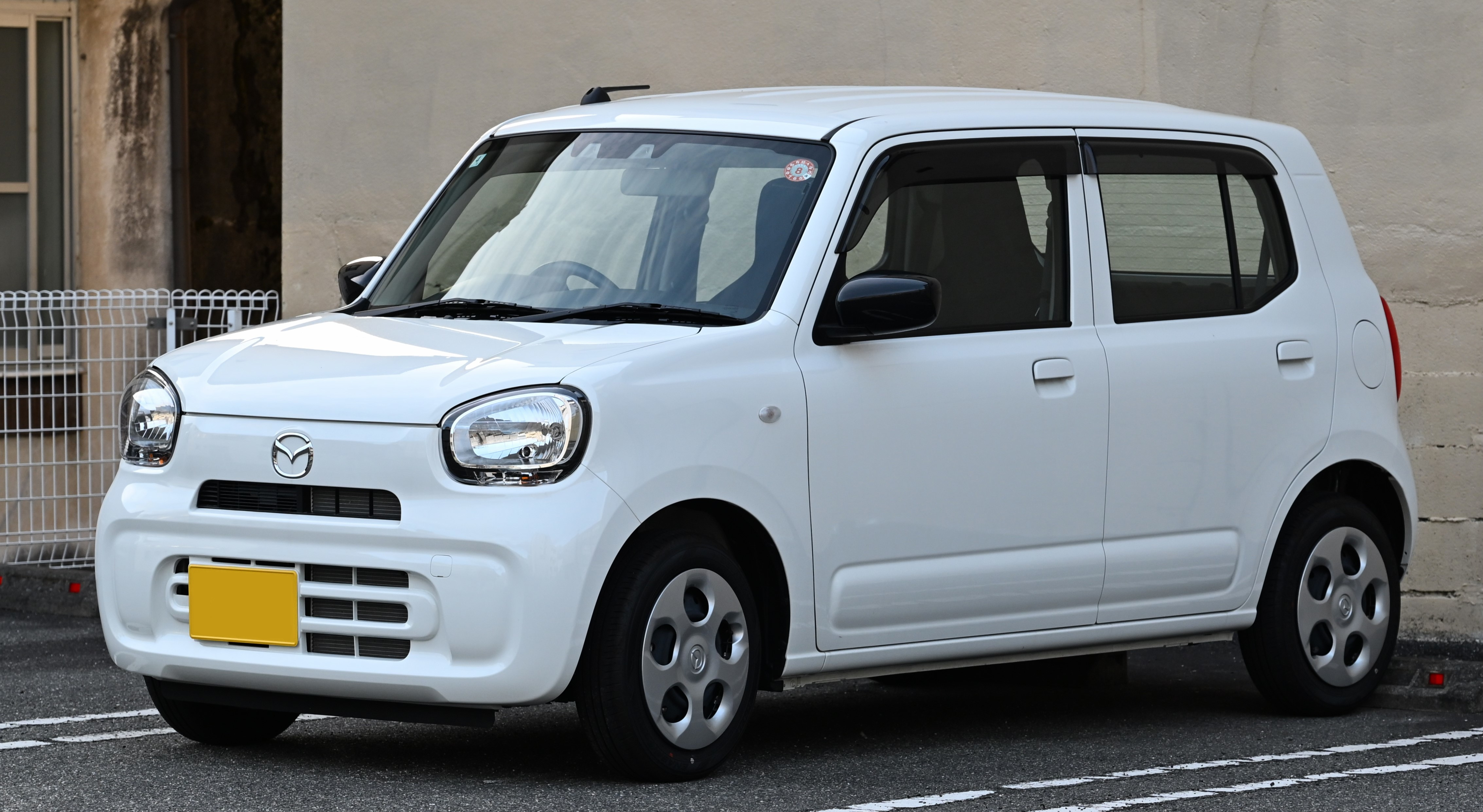
- Eight generation Mazda Carol

Overview
- Manufacturer: Mazda (1962–1970); Suzuki (1989–present)
- Production: 1962–1970; 1989–present

Body and chassis
- Class: Kei car
- Body style: 2/4-door sedan (1962–1970); 3-door hatchback (1989–1998); 5-door hatchback (1998–present)
- Layout: Rear-engine, rear-wheel-drive (1962–1970); Front-engine, front-wheel-drive or four-wheel-drive (1989–present)

The Mazda Carol is a kei car manufactured by Mazda from 1962 until 1970. The Carol name was revived again with Mazda's 1989 re-entry into the kei car class with the Autozam brand. Since 1989, the Carol has been a rebadged model manufactured by Suzuki for Mazda, based on the Japanese Suzuki Alto. The first two generations of the modern era Carols received unique bodywork, but since late 1998 the nameplate has been strictly a badging exercise.

== First generation (1962) ==
First generation (KPDA)
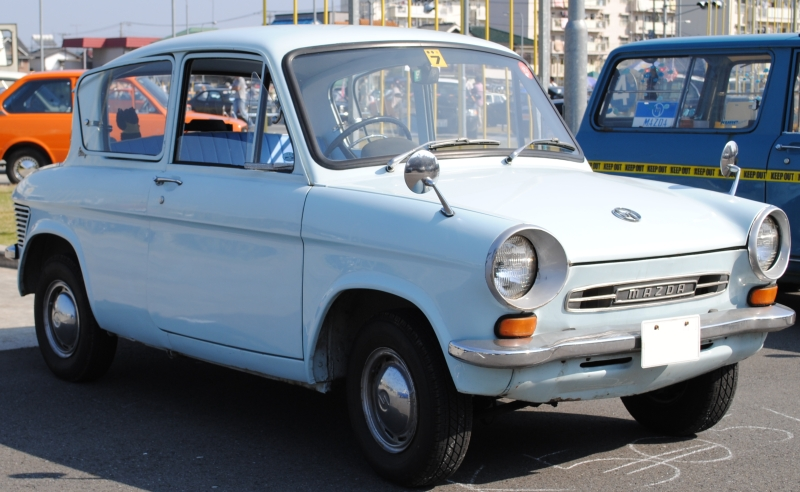
- Pre-facelift model (1962-1966)

Overview
- Also called: Mazda P360
- Production: February 1962–August 1970
- Assembly: Japan: Hiroshima (Hiroshima Assembly)

Body and chassis
- Body style: 2/4-door sedan
- Layout: Rear-engine, rear-wheel-drive
- Related: Mazda R360

Powertrain
- Engine: 358 cc DA OHV I4

Dimensions
- Wheelbase: 1,930 mm (76.0 in)
- Length: 2,990 mm (117.7 in)
- Width: 1,295 mm (51.0 in)
- Height: 1,320 mm (52.0 in)

Chronology
- Successor: Mazda Chantez

The Mazda R360 was complemented by the more grown-up 2-door sedan Mazda P360 Carol in February 1962, the company's first 4-passenger car, and complemented the three-wheeled Mazda Mazdago. It was more substantial than the R360: although its total length of 2,980 mm (117.3 in) was the same, its 1,930 mm (76.0 in) wheelbase was considerably longer. The Carol weighed in at 525 kg (1,157 lb), versus 380 kg (838 lb) for the diminutive R360. It used the DA, a 18 PS (13 kW), rear-mounted water-cooled 358 cc 4-cylinder OHV engine. This is one of the smallest four-cylinder automobile engines in history, only Honda's 356 cc DOHC alloy inline-four unit (used in the T360 truck) was smaller. The four-speed gearbox was synchronized only on the top three gears.

The Carol was perhaps overengineered: it had a very strong monocoque body, a four-cylinder four-stroke engine with a five-bearing crankshaft and four-wheel independent suspension by torsion bars, but this led to high production costs, comparably high weight, and its very comfortable ride was offset by cramped accommodation. Nonetheless, the Carol was an incredible success in the marketplace, capturing 67% of the Kei market in its first year. A better equipped DeLuxe version was added in May 1962, along with a changed angle of the rear window to help it stay clean. In September 1963, shortly after a reshaped combustion head and upgrade to 20 PS (15 kW), a four-door version appeared.

In October 1966 a minor facelift took place. The car was lightened somewhat, new bumpers were mounted, and the spare tire was moved from the front to the engine room, freeing up scarce luggage space. Also, the gearbox was now fully synchronized. The last modification took place in 1969, when in response to stricter safety standards a driver's side headrest and provisions for seatbelts were fitted. Production continued until August 1970, by which time 265,226 Carol 360s had been built. Mazda did not offer a Kei class passenger car for two years, until the 1972 introduction of the Chantez.

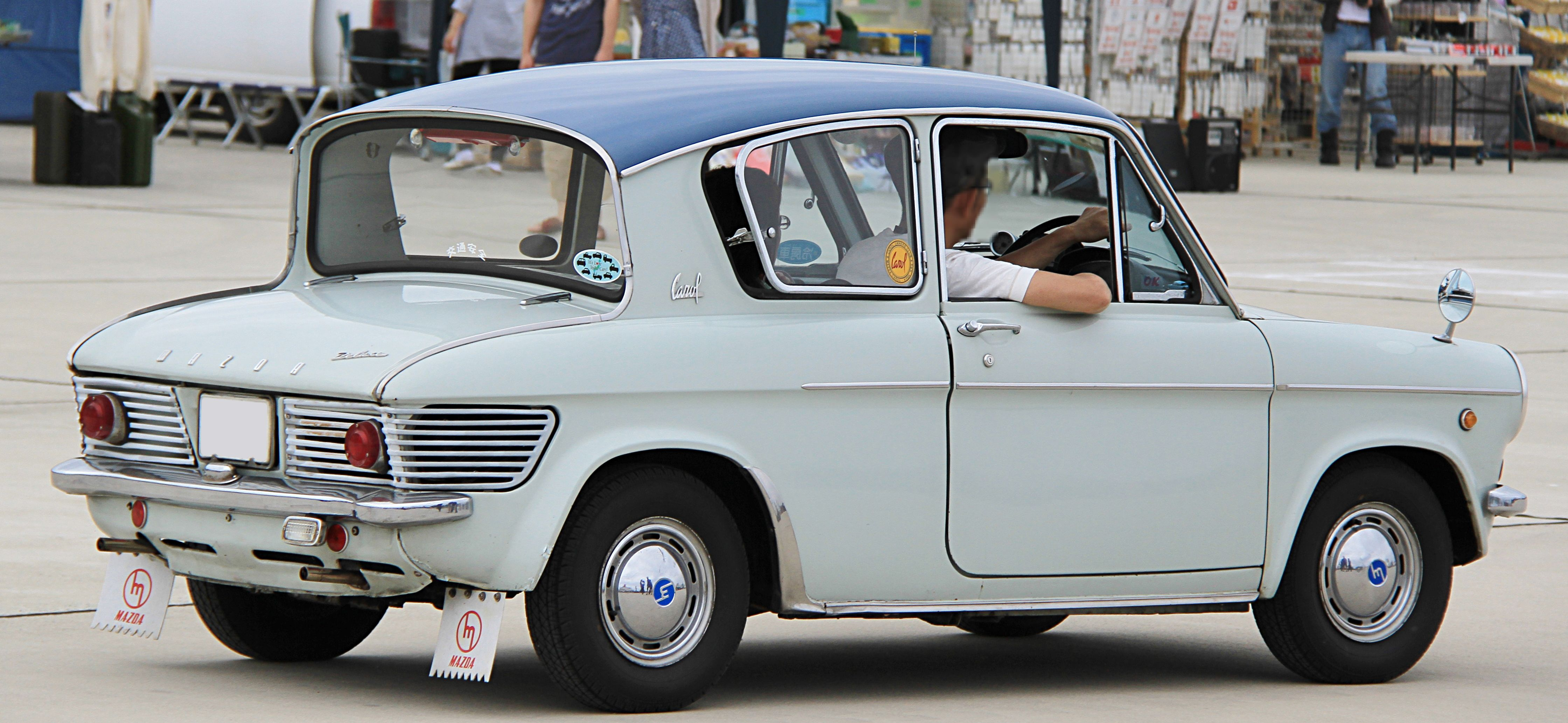
Rear view of a two-door Carol 360

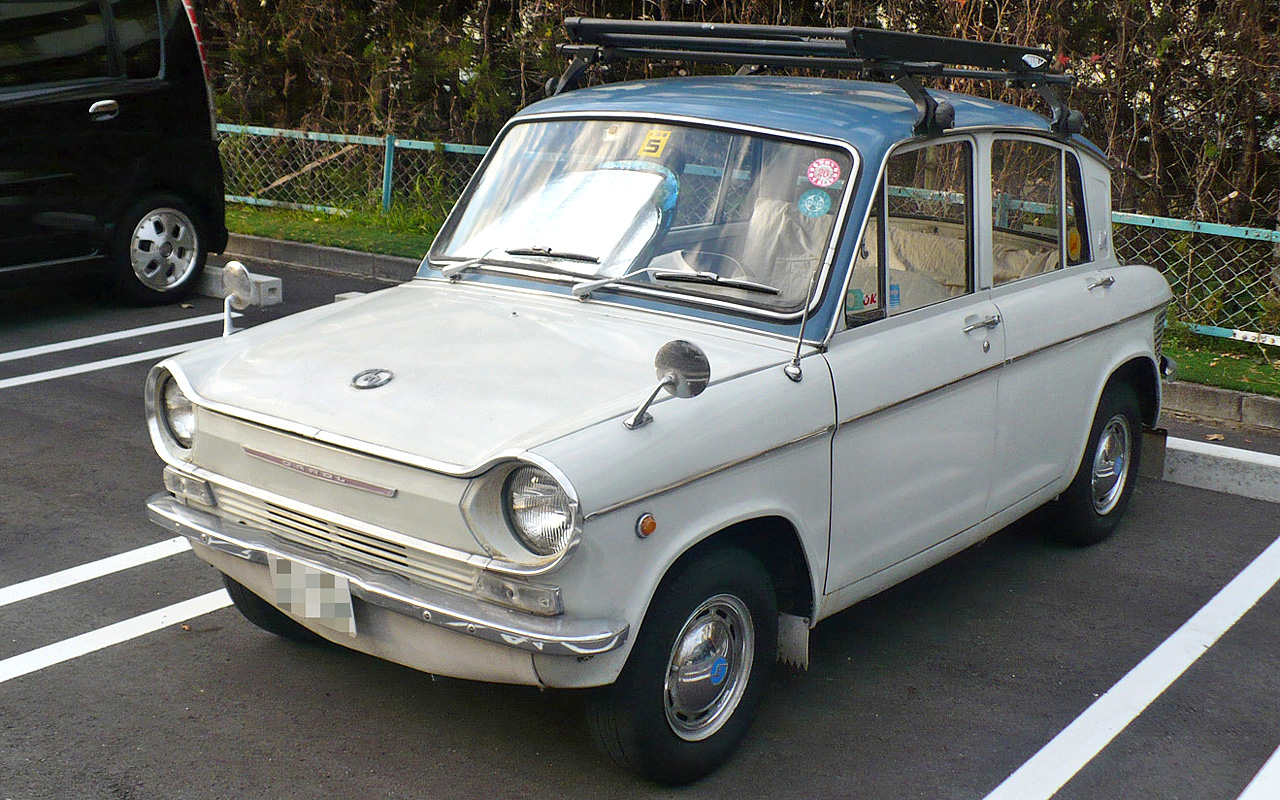
Facelift four-door Carol 360

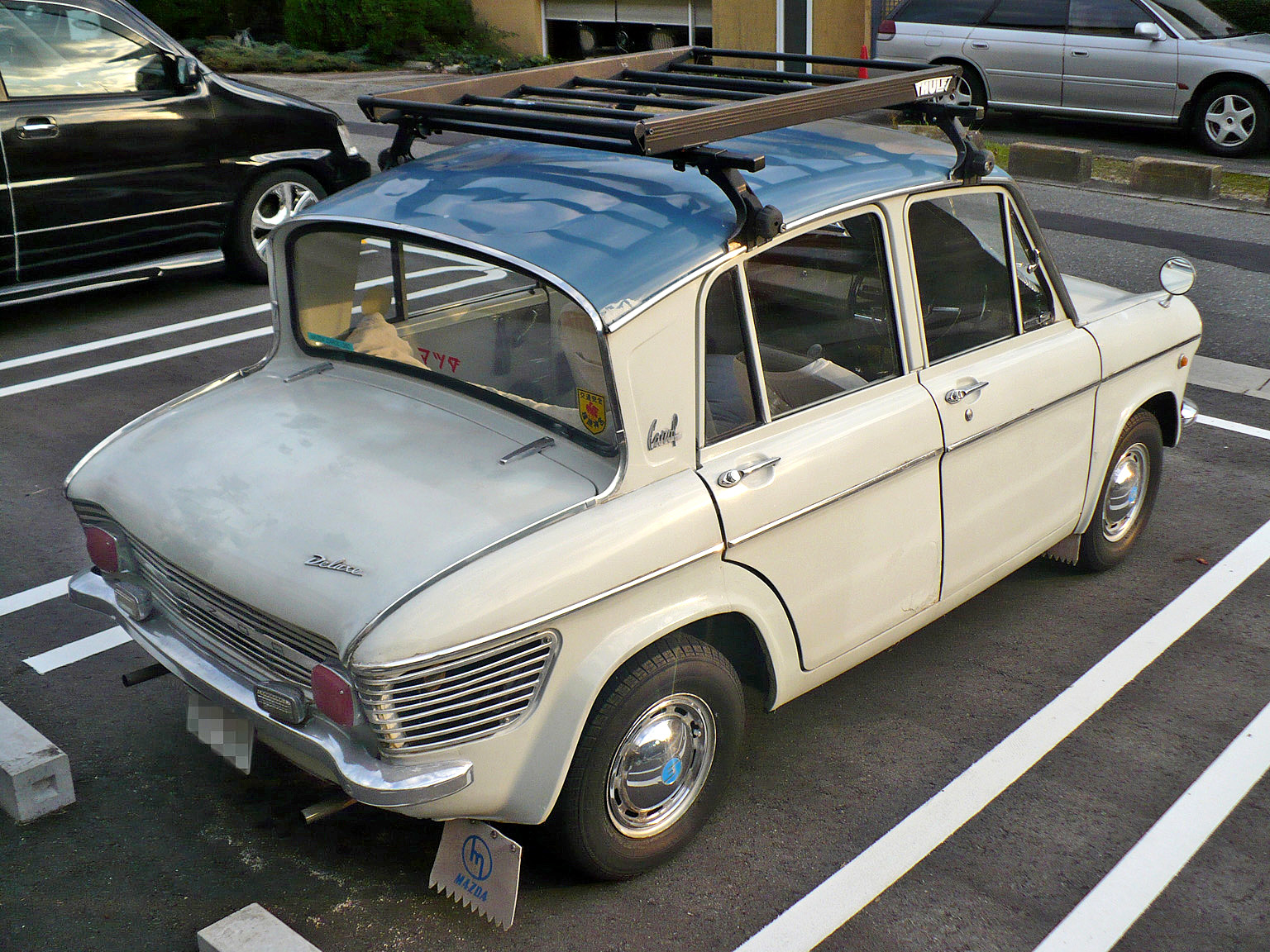
Facelift four-door Carol 360 (rear)

=== Carol 600 (1962–1964) ===
Mazda Carol 600
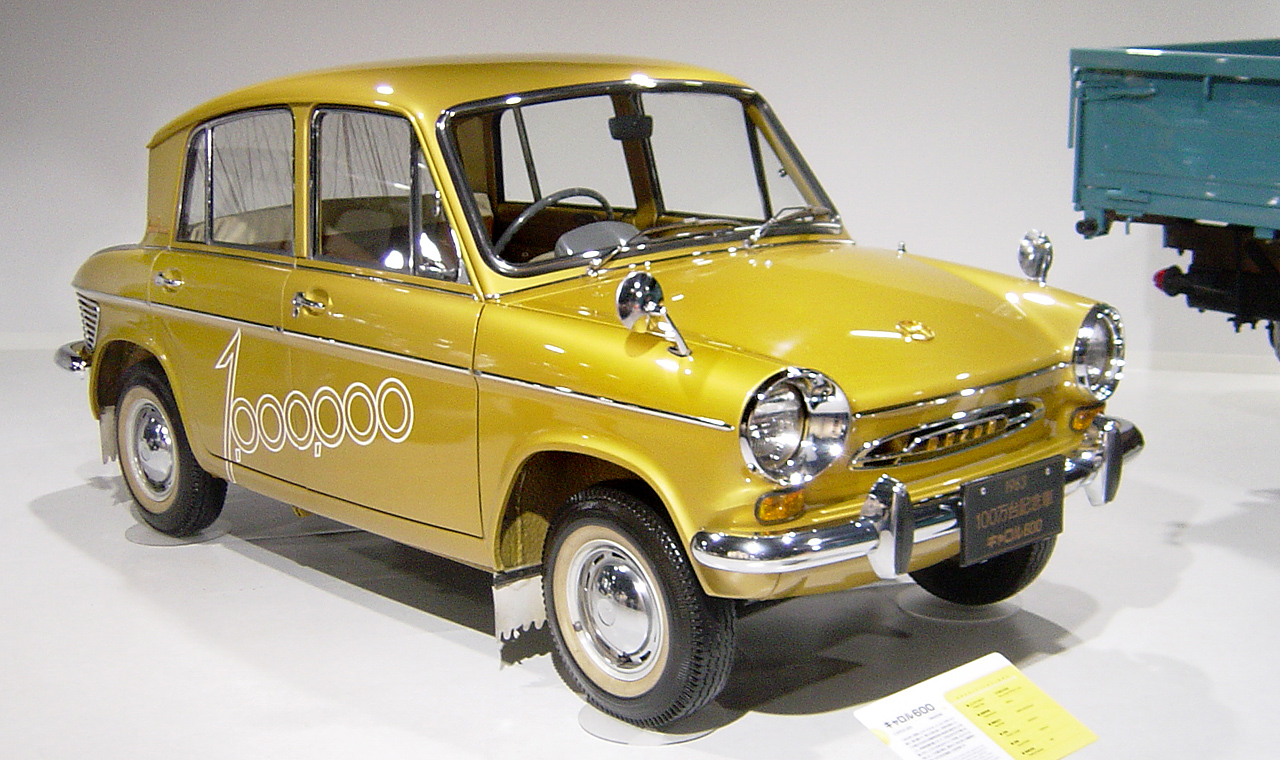

Overview
- Also called: Mazda P600
- Production: November 1962–1964

Powertrain
- Engine: 586 cc RA OHV I4

Dimensions
- Wheelbase: 1,930 mm (76.0 in)
- Length: 3,200 mm (126.0 in)
- Width: 1,325 mm (52.2 in)
- Height: 1,340 mm (52.8 in)
- Curb weight: 585 kg (1,289.7 lb)

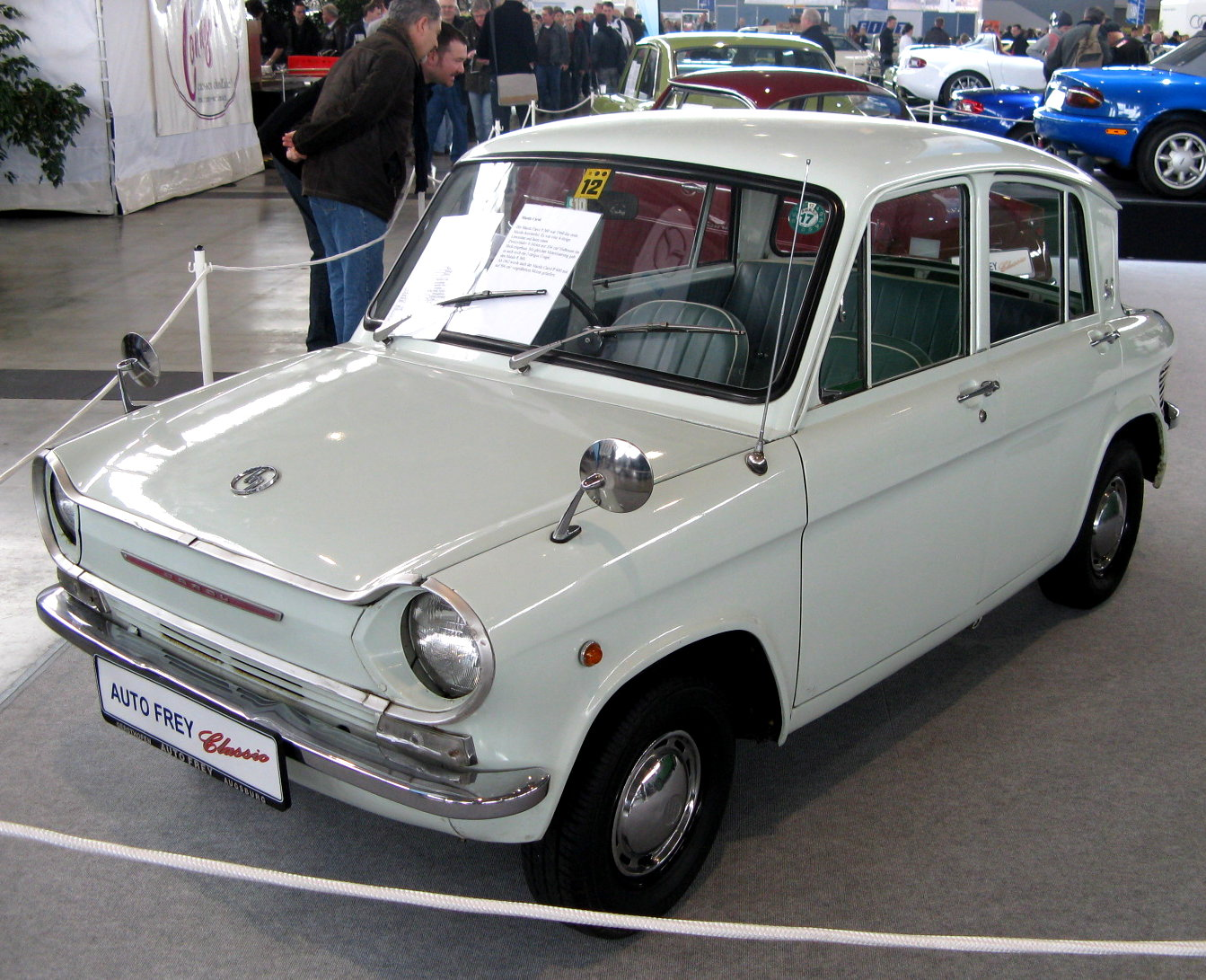
Mazda Carol P600 (1962)

The Carol 600 appeared in the fall of 1962 with a larger 586 cc RA OHV engine and longer at 3,200 mm. The extra length was due to more prominent bumpers, passenger space was as restricted as in the 360. Weight ranged from 560 to 585 kg (1,235 to 1,290 lb). It was also available as a four-door sedan, ahead of the lesser Carol 360. The car was called the "600" or "P600" in export markets. At home, there was a Standard two-door, and DeLuxe two- or four-door versions. Production ended in November 1964, after the introduction of the more spacious Mazda Familia 800 sedan version. Around 8,800 Carol 600s were built.

== Second generation (1989) ==
Second generation (AA5XA/AA6XA)
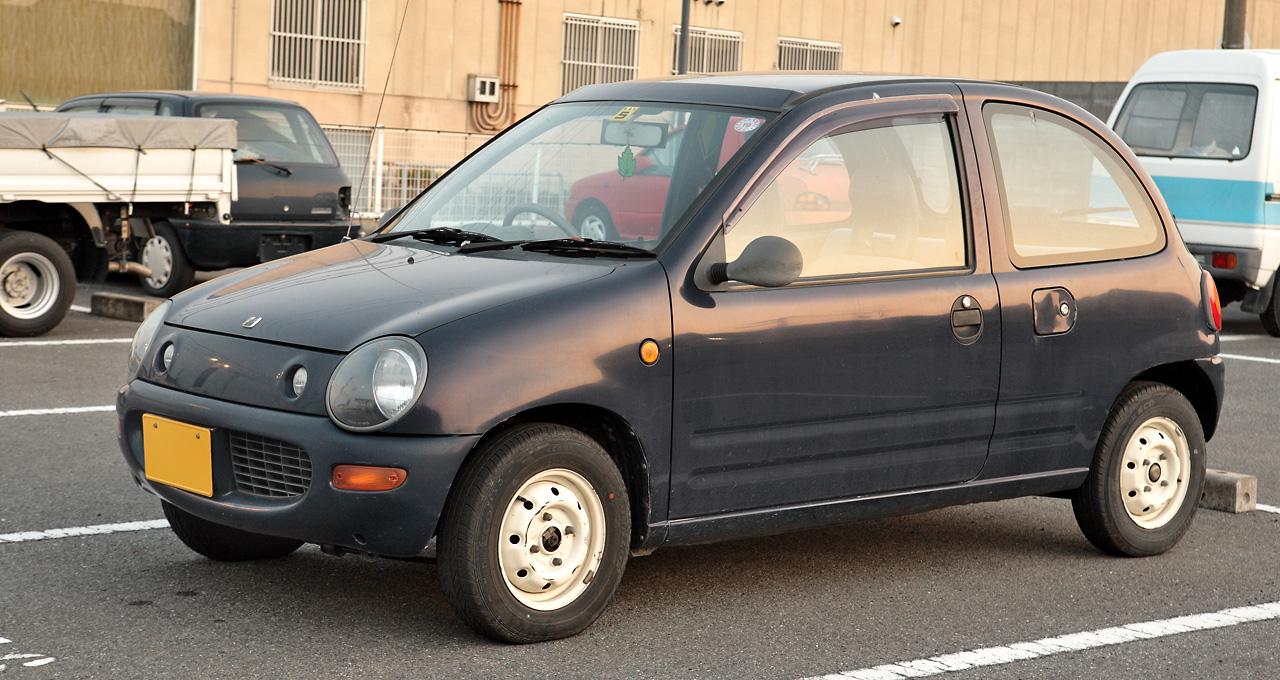
- Facelift model (1990–1995)

Overview
- Production: October 1989–October 1995

Body and chassis
- Body style: 3-door hatchback
- Layout: Front-engine, front-wheel-drive Front-engine, four-wheel-drive
- Related: Suzuki Alto

Powertrain
- Engine: 547 cc F5B I3; 657 cc F6A I3

Dimensions
- Curb weight: 580–630 kg (1,279–1,389 lb)

With the revival of the Kei class in the late eighties, Mazda revived the Carol name in October 1989 for the Autozam Carol. The recently introduced Autozam was to be Mazda's youthful brand and was used on Mazda's kei cars for some time. The Carol was produced for Mazda by Suzuki, and while it used the Suzuki Alto's platform and mechanicals, its interior and boldly curved exterior were largely unique. Its round headlights and cute appearance were very much a product of its time and followed upon the heels of similar designs such as Nissan's Be-1 and Pao. It was either front (AA5PA) or all-wheel drive (AA5RA) and its SOHC 547 cc 3-cylinder Suzuki F5B engine produced 40 PS (29 kW) at 7,500 rpm. The Carol had a 2,335 mm (92 in) wheelbase for a total length of 3,190 mm (126 in) and was 1,295 mm (51 in) wide. Brakes were discs up front and drums in rear.

Equipment levels were e, f (also 4WD), and the top g version. The g featured a Canvas Top. Four-wheel drives received a five-speed gearbox, while the front-wheel drive versions received a four- or five-speed manual or a three-speed auto. 550 cc Carols are rare, as production ended after only four months. New Kei car regulations for 1990 allowed manufacturers a bigger engine and an extra 10 cm of body length, and Mazda quickly brought out an updated Carol.

=== Facelift (1990–1995) ===
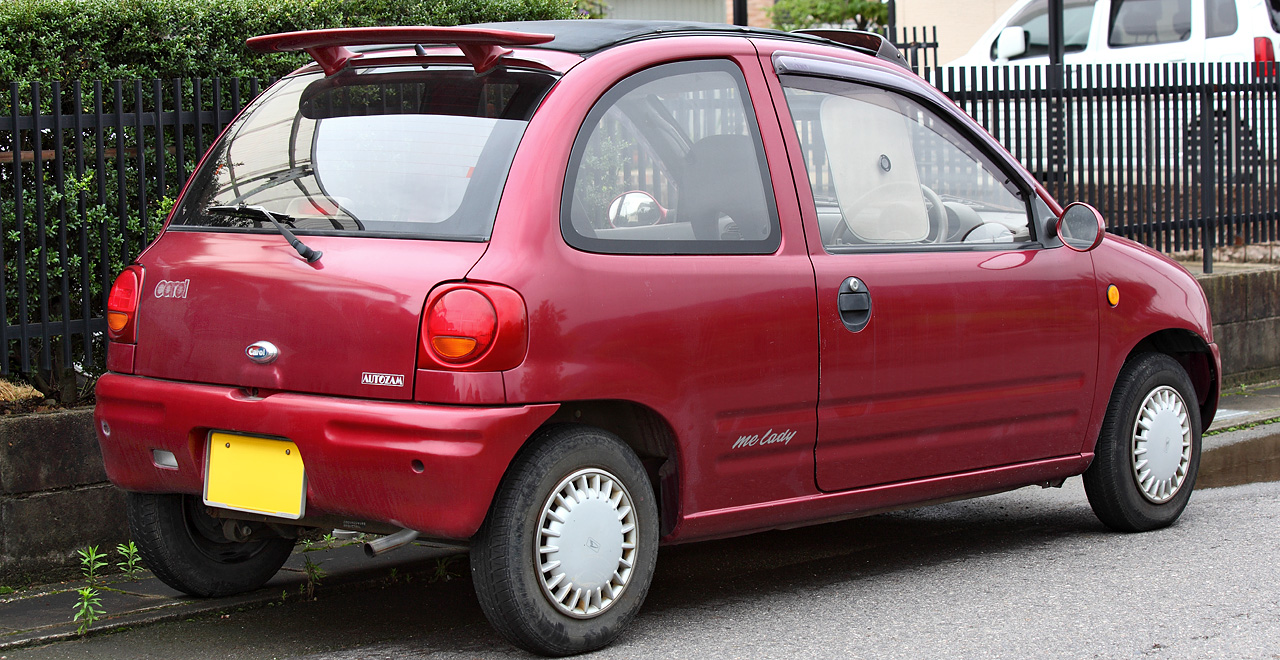
Autozam Carol "Me Lady" special edition (AA6PA)

New regulations brought about the replacement of the 1989 Carol within 4 months, as the larger AA6 Carol was presented in February 1990. The new car was 6 cm longer and used a larger 657 cc Suzuki F6A engine with 52 PS (38 kW). The car is easy to tell from its predecessor by its clear headlight covers. In 1991, Mazda offered a 61 PS (45 kW) turbocharged engine, and the car was further lengthened to 329 cm in 1992.

== Third generation (1995) ==
Third generation (AC6)
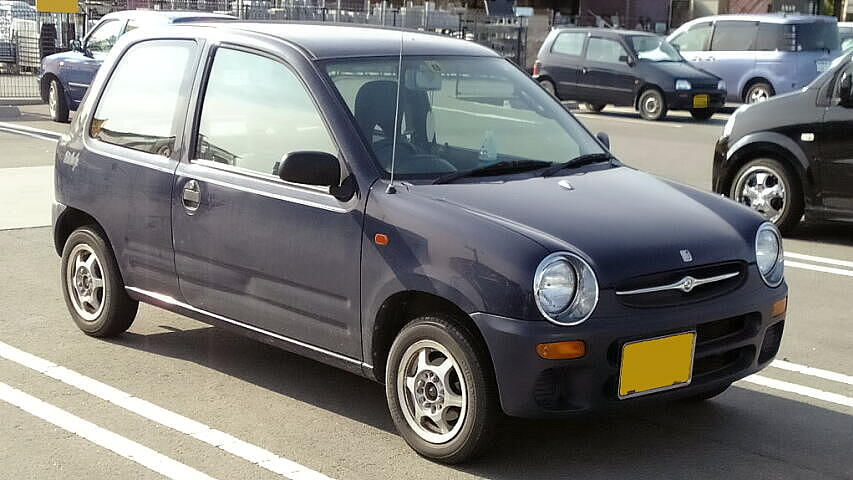

Overview
- Production: 1995–1998

Body and chassis
- Related: Suzuki Alto

Powertrain
- Engine: 657 cc F6A I3; 657 cc F6A turbo I3

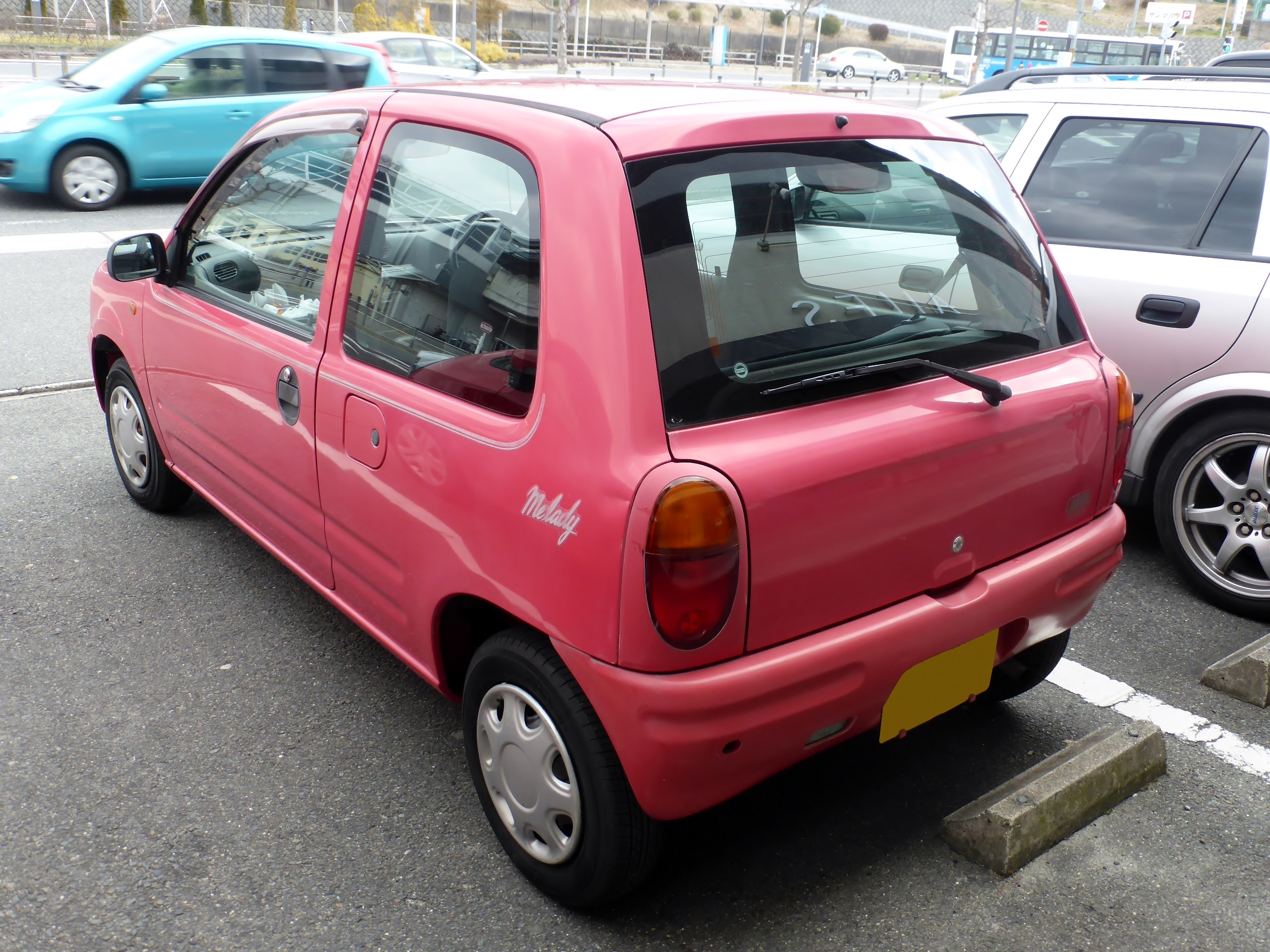
Autozam Carol rear

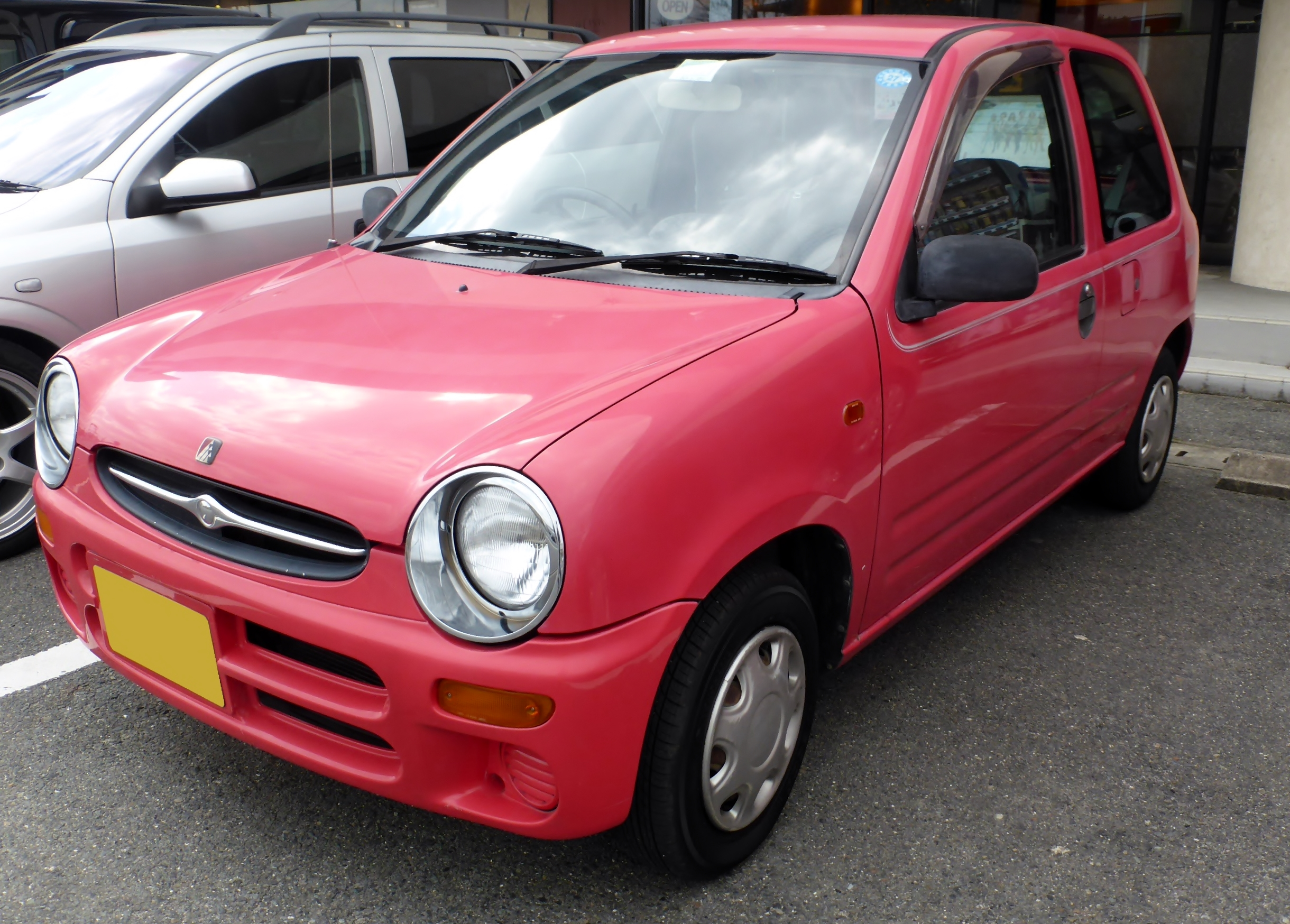
Autozam Carol front

An updated Autozam Carol came out in October 1995 as a 1996 model. Again, it was front or all-wheel drive and still sharing its platform with the Suzuki Alto. This generation also received model-specific bodywork, and was also only available as a three-door hatchback with a vestigial notchback design. A turbocharged SOHC version was available, although it was marketed without any sporting pretensions and did not even have a rev counter. Mazda also developed two retro-styled versions as a wave of such models flooded the Kei car market at the time; these were called the Carol Custom and the Carol Classic.

During 1998, the model's name was changed to "Mazda Carol" as the Autozam badge was being discontinued.

== Fourth generation (1998) ==
Fourth generation (HB12/22/23)
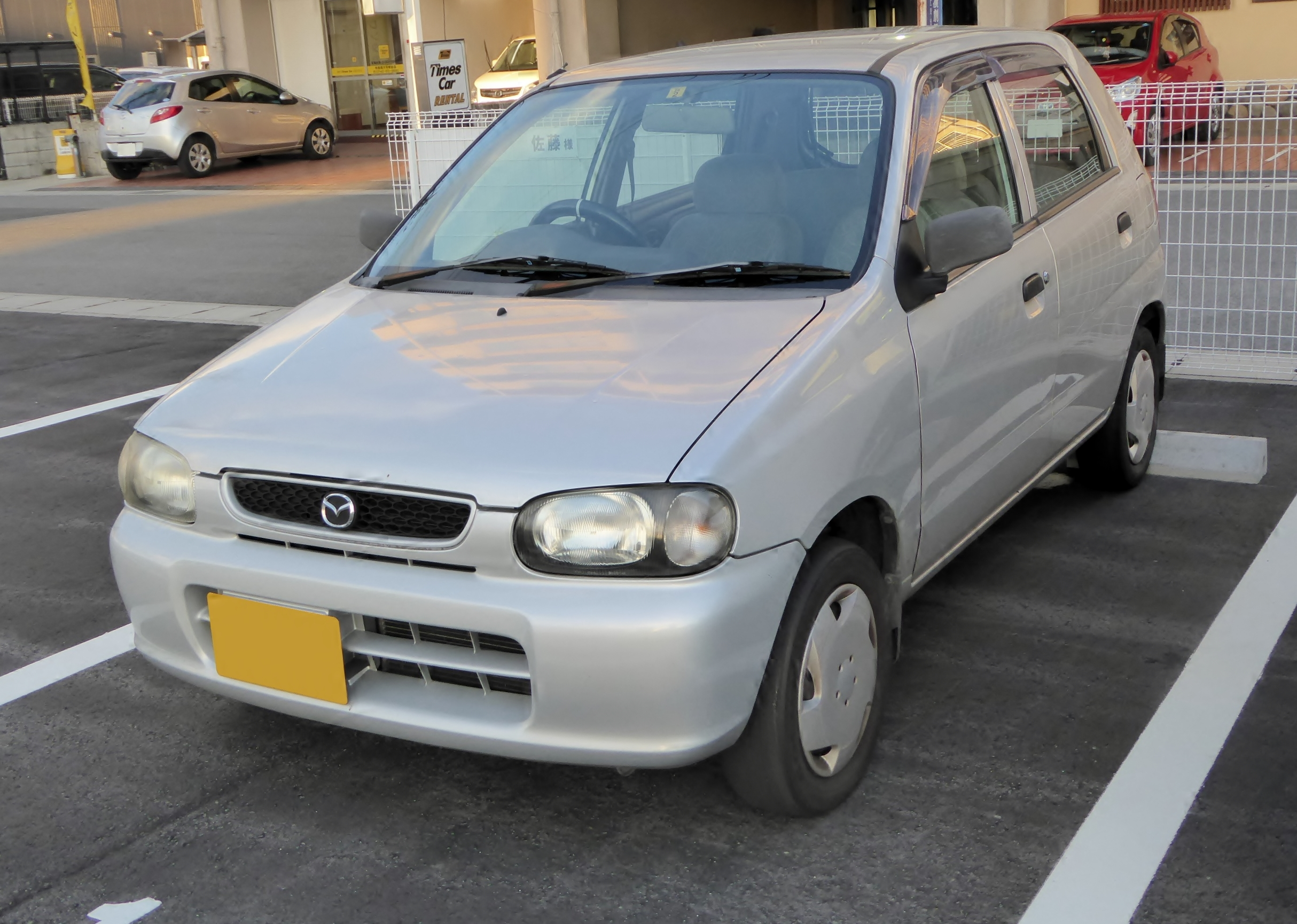

Overview
- Production: 1998–2004

Body and chassis
- Related: Mazda AZ-Offroad; Mazda AZ-Wagon; Suzuki Alto

Powertrain
- Engine: 657 cc F6A SOHC I3; 658 cc K6A lean burn DOHC I3; 658 cc K6A VVT DOHC I3

An entirely new Carol appeared in October 1998 as a 1999 model, this time with the Mazda brand name. Unlike previous Carols, this model was similar to the Suzuki Alto. This Carol was available with either front or all-wheel drive and used the old 657 cc F6A engine or a new 658 cc DOHC unit. It was closely related to the AZ-Offroad and AZ-Wagon introduced at the same time.

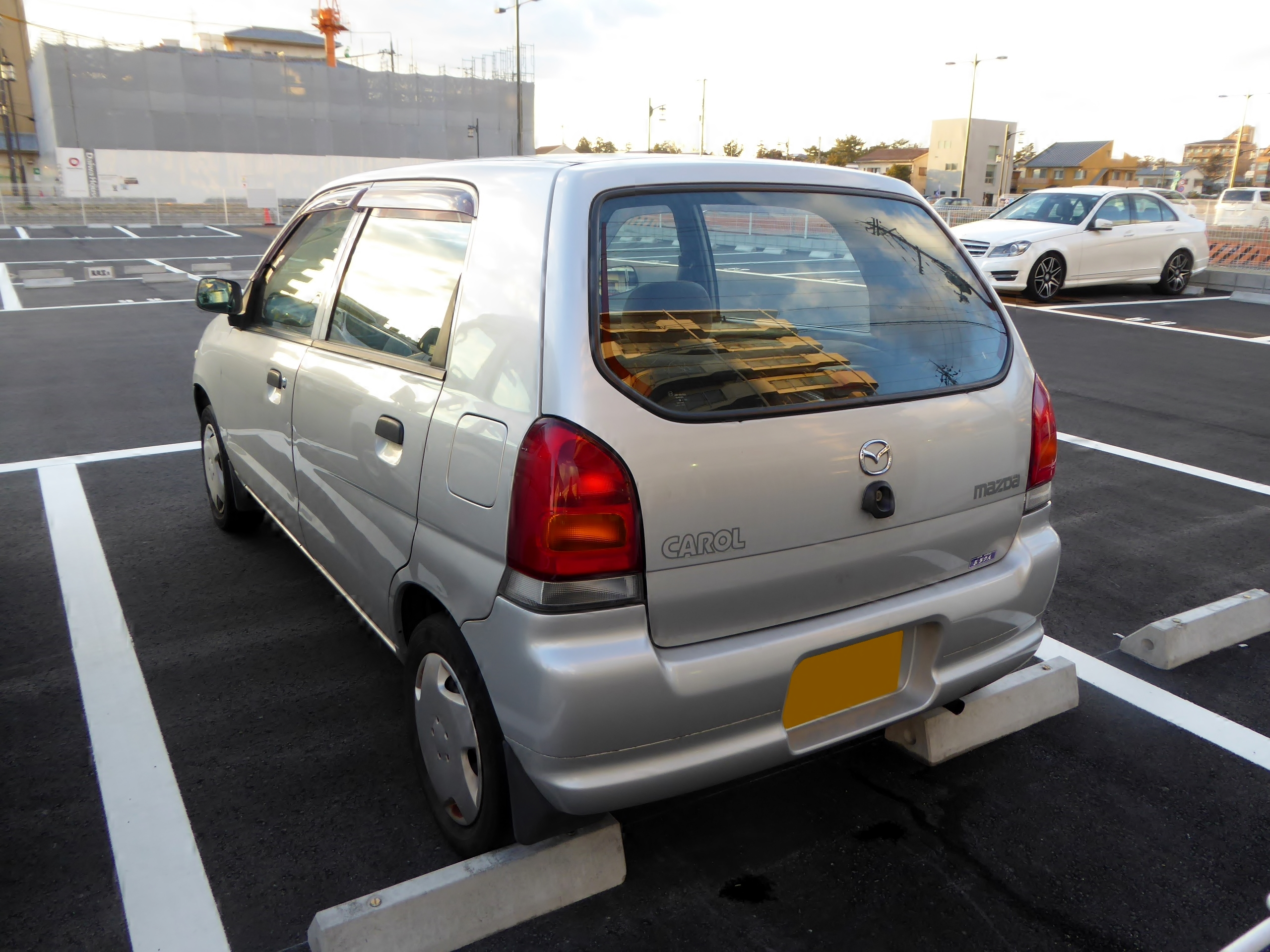
Mazda Carol rear

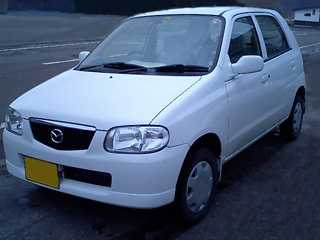
Facelift model (2001–2004)

The Carol was updated with a new look in December 2000, featuring Mazda's new five-point grille design. Safety and emissions were also improved, thanks to new variants of the K-series family of engines with available variable valve timing. The earlier F6A was no longer available.

== Fifth generation (2004) ==
Fifth generation (HB24)
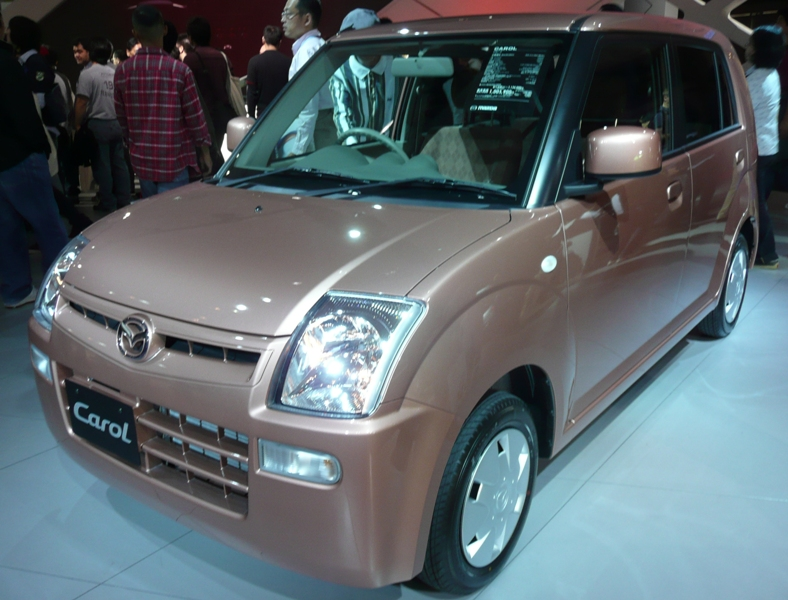

Overview
- Production: 2004–2009

Body and chassis
- Related: Nissan Pino; Suzuki Alto

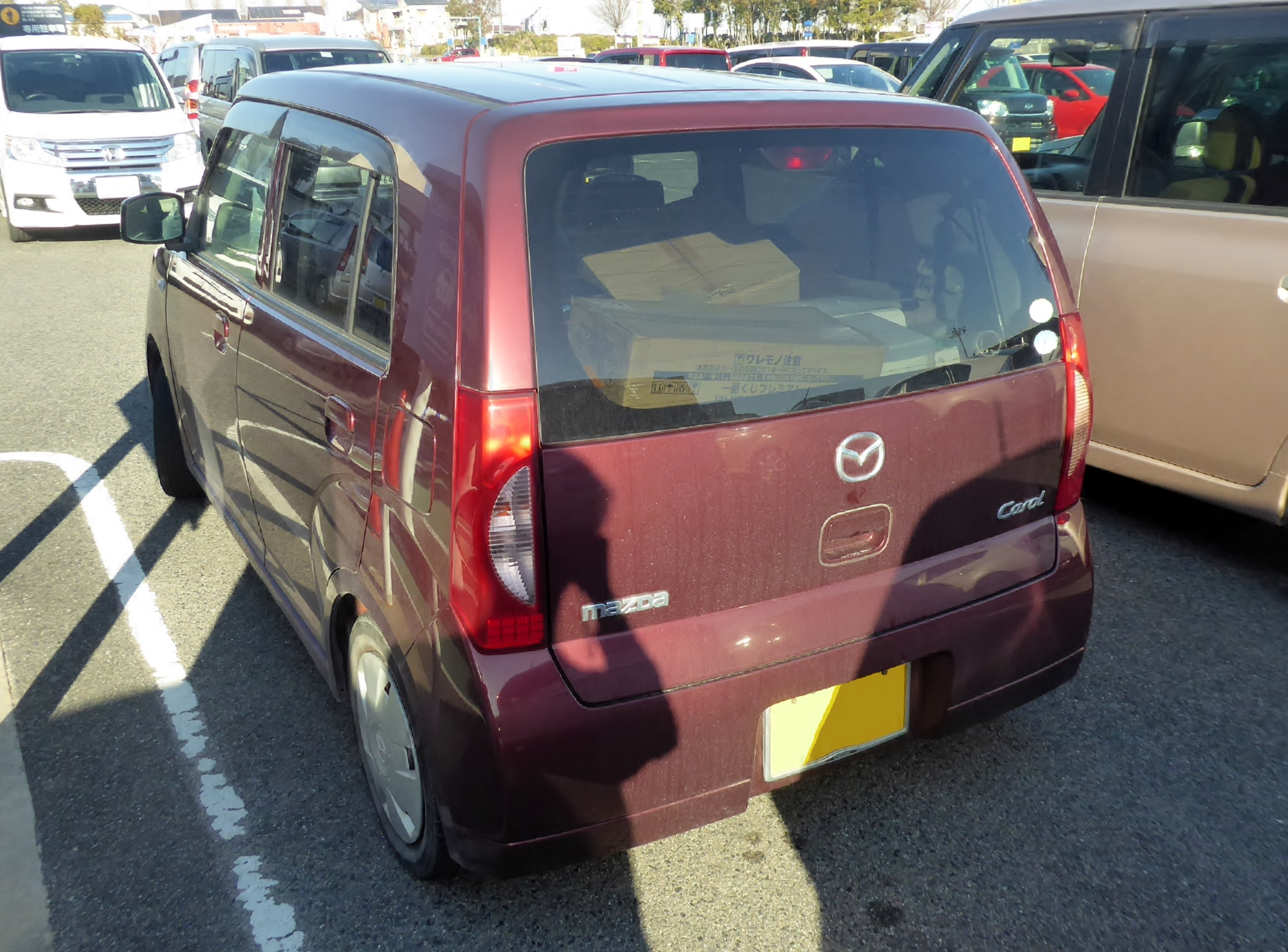
Mazda Carol rear

As Suzuki released a replacement for the Suzuki Alto, the rebadged Mazda Carol was also replaced.

== Sixth generation (2009) ==
Sixth generation (HB25/35)
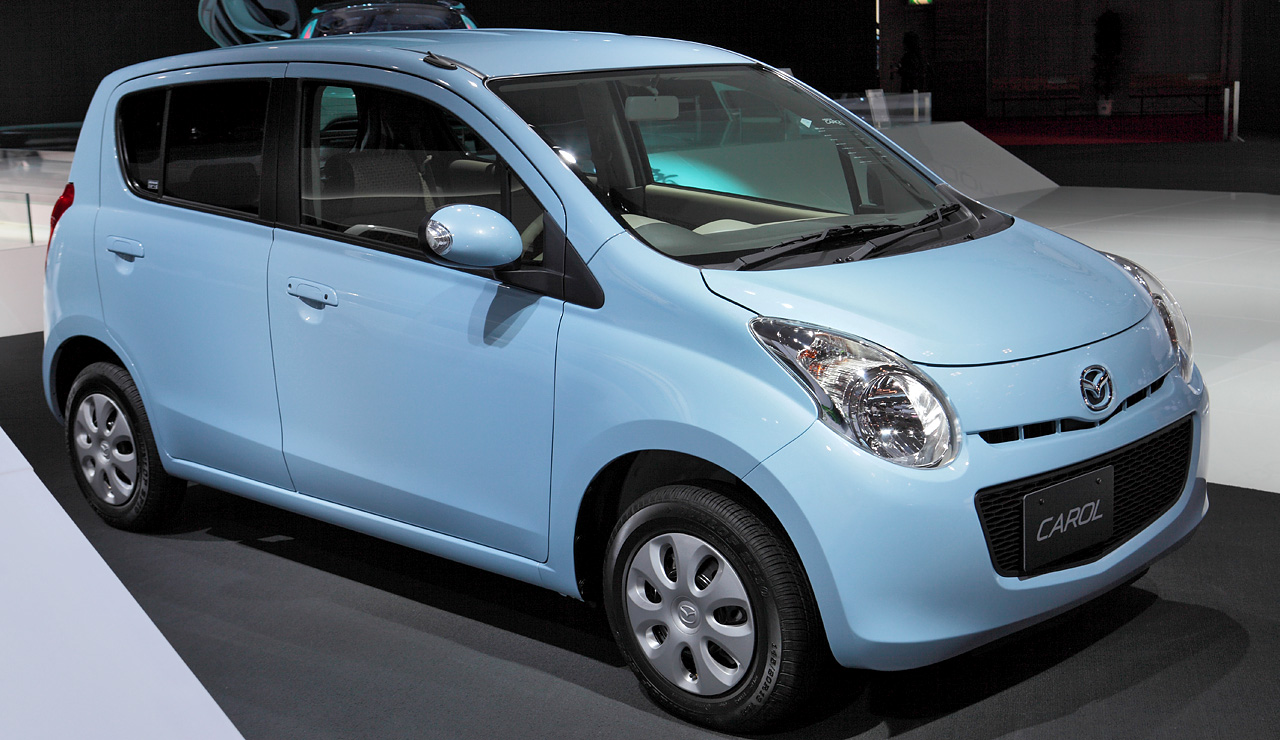

Overview
- Production: 2009–2014

Body and chassis
- Related: Suzuki Alto

Powertrain
- Engine: 658 cc K6A I3

Dimensions
- Wheelbase: 2,400 mm (94.5 in)
- Length: 3,395 mm (133.7 in)
- Width: 1,475 mm (58.1 in)
- Height: 1,535 mm (60.4 in)
- Curb weight: 740 kg (1,631.4 lb)

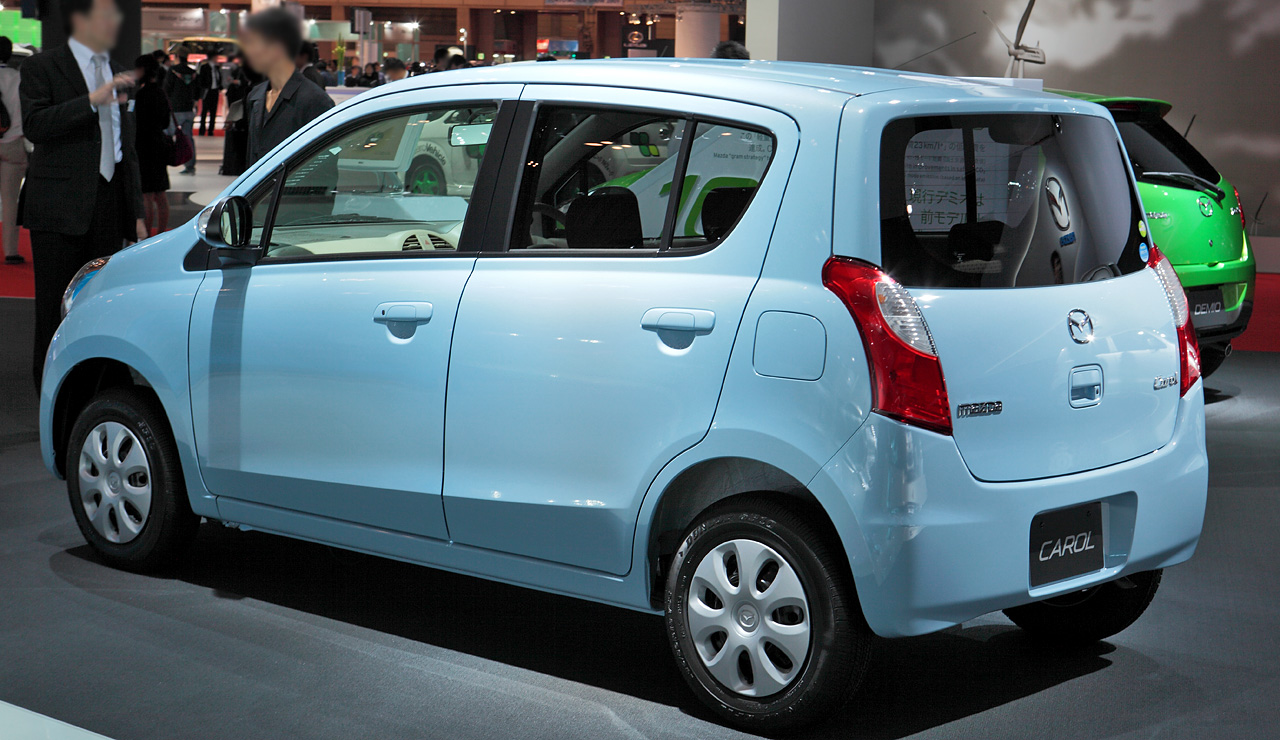
Mazda Carol rear

Mazda has launched a new Carol in December 2009, which was first revealed at the 2009 Tokyo Motor Show. The Carol has been updated alongside its brother, the Suzuki Alto. Like the Alto, the Carol is available with AWD and CVT.

== Seventh generation (2014) ==
Seventh generation (HB36)
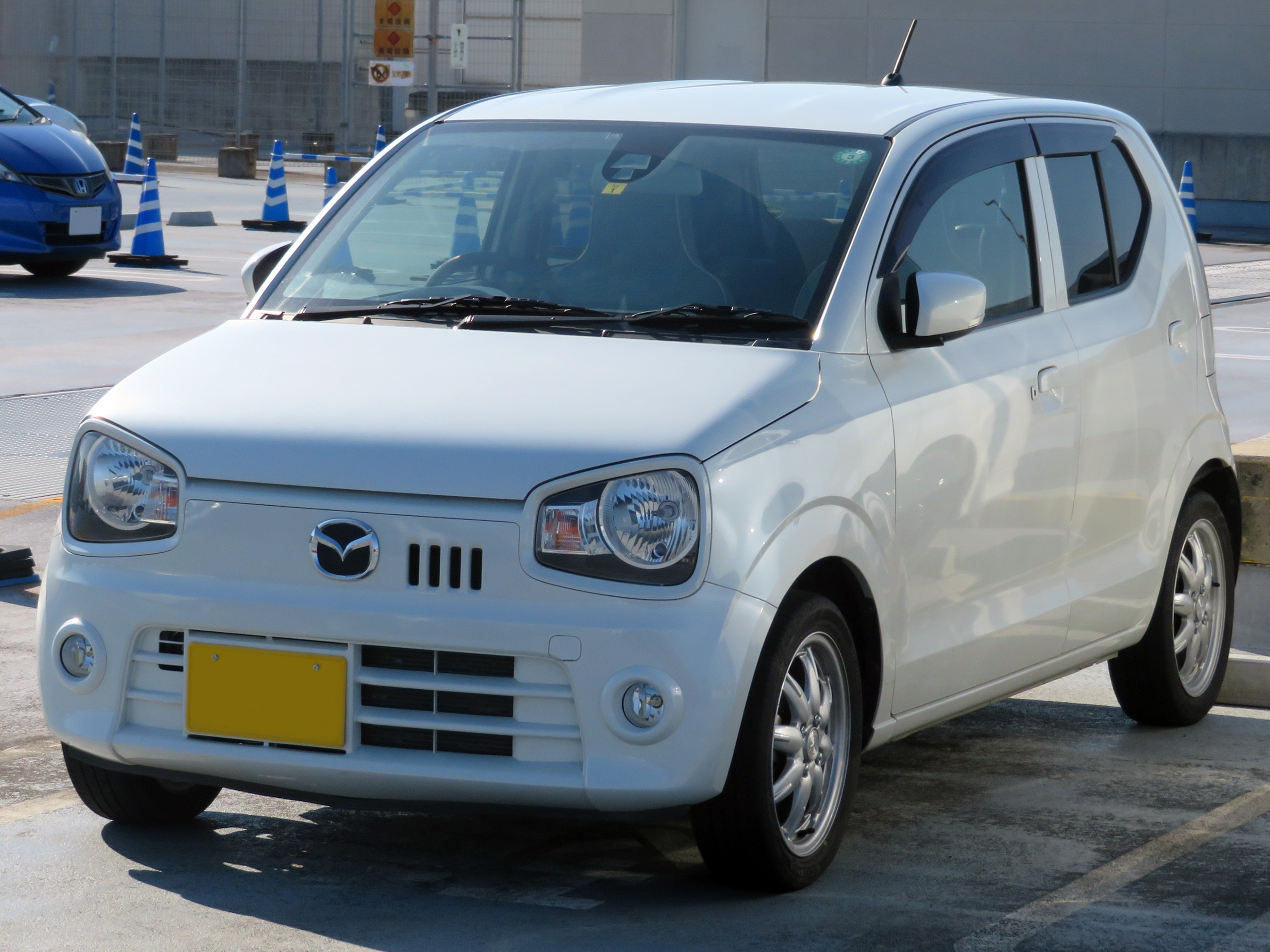

Overview
- Production: 2014–2021

Body and chassis
- Layout: Front-engine, front-wheel-drive Front-engine, four-wheel-drive
- Related: Suzuki Alto

Powertrain
- Engine: 658 cc R06A I3 VVT

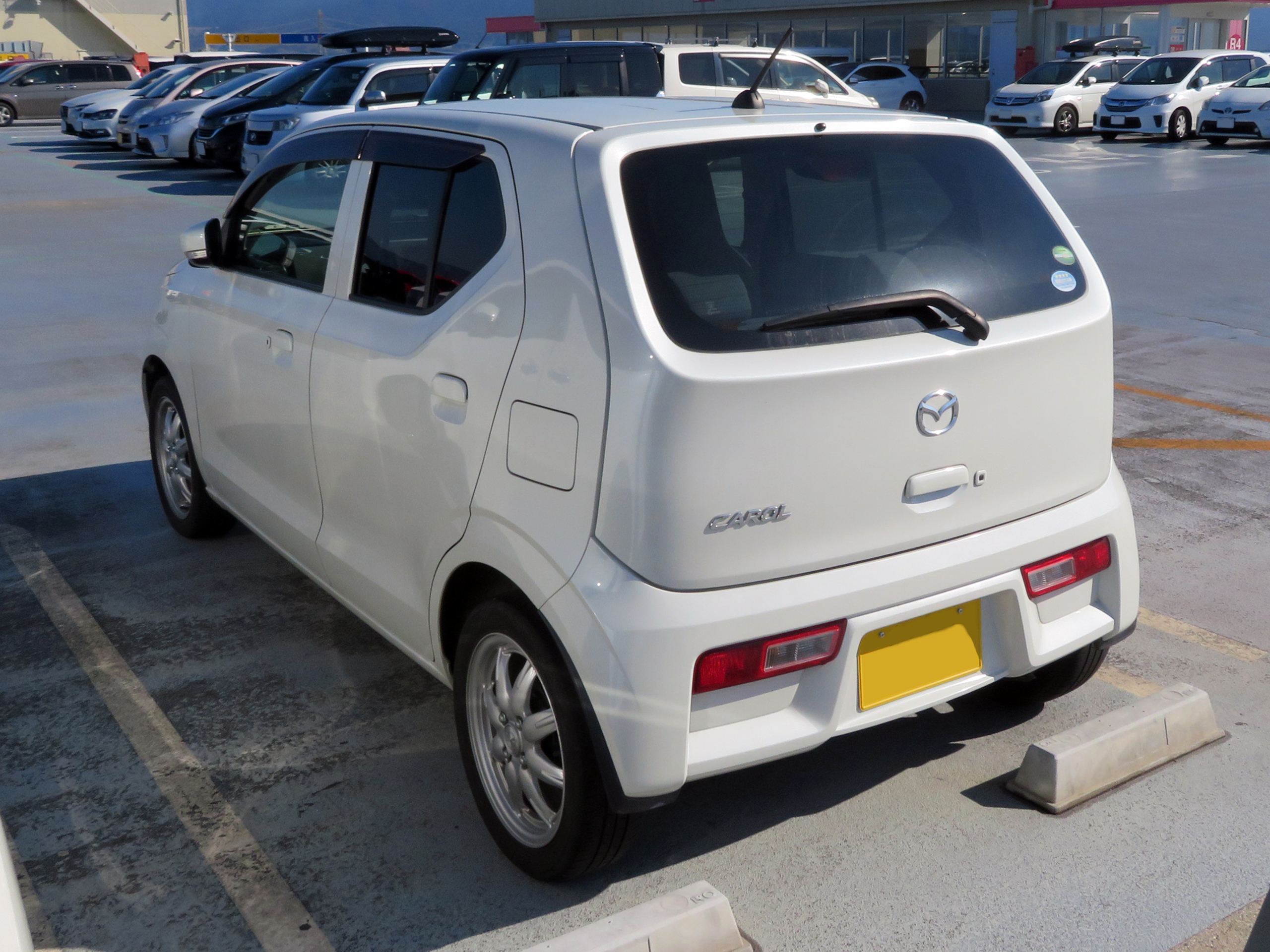
Mazda Carol rear

As Suzuki released a replacement for the Suzuki Alto, the rebadged Mazda Carol was also replaced.

== Eighth generation (HB37/97S; 2021) ==
Eighth generation (HB37/HB97)
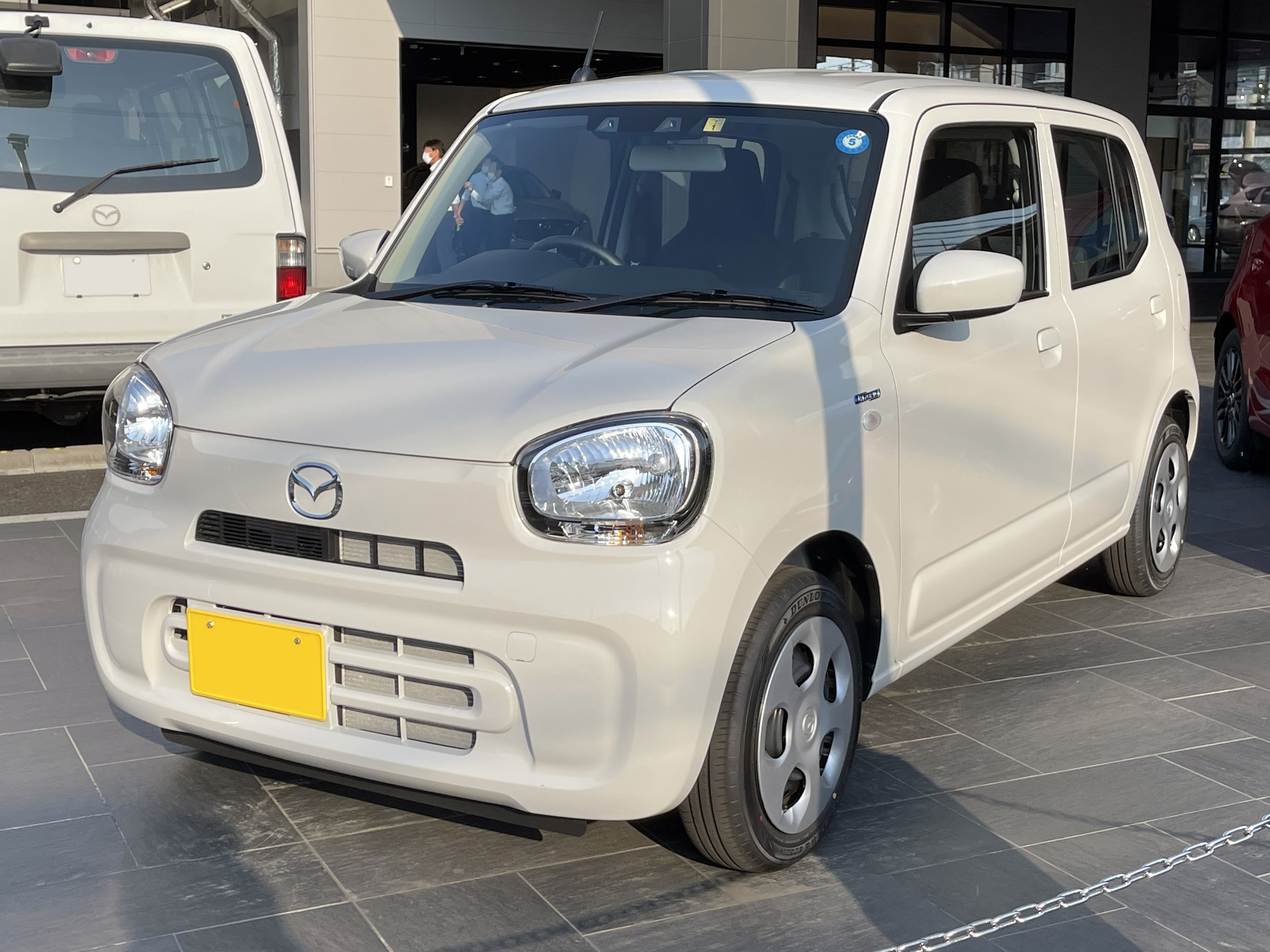

Overview
- Production: December 2021–present

Body and chassis
- Layout: Front-engine, front-wheel-drive Front-engine, four-wheel-drive
- Related: Suzuki Alto (ninth generation)

Powertrain
- Engine: 657 cc R06D I3 (MHEV); 658 cc R06A I3 VVT

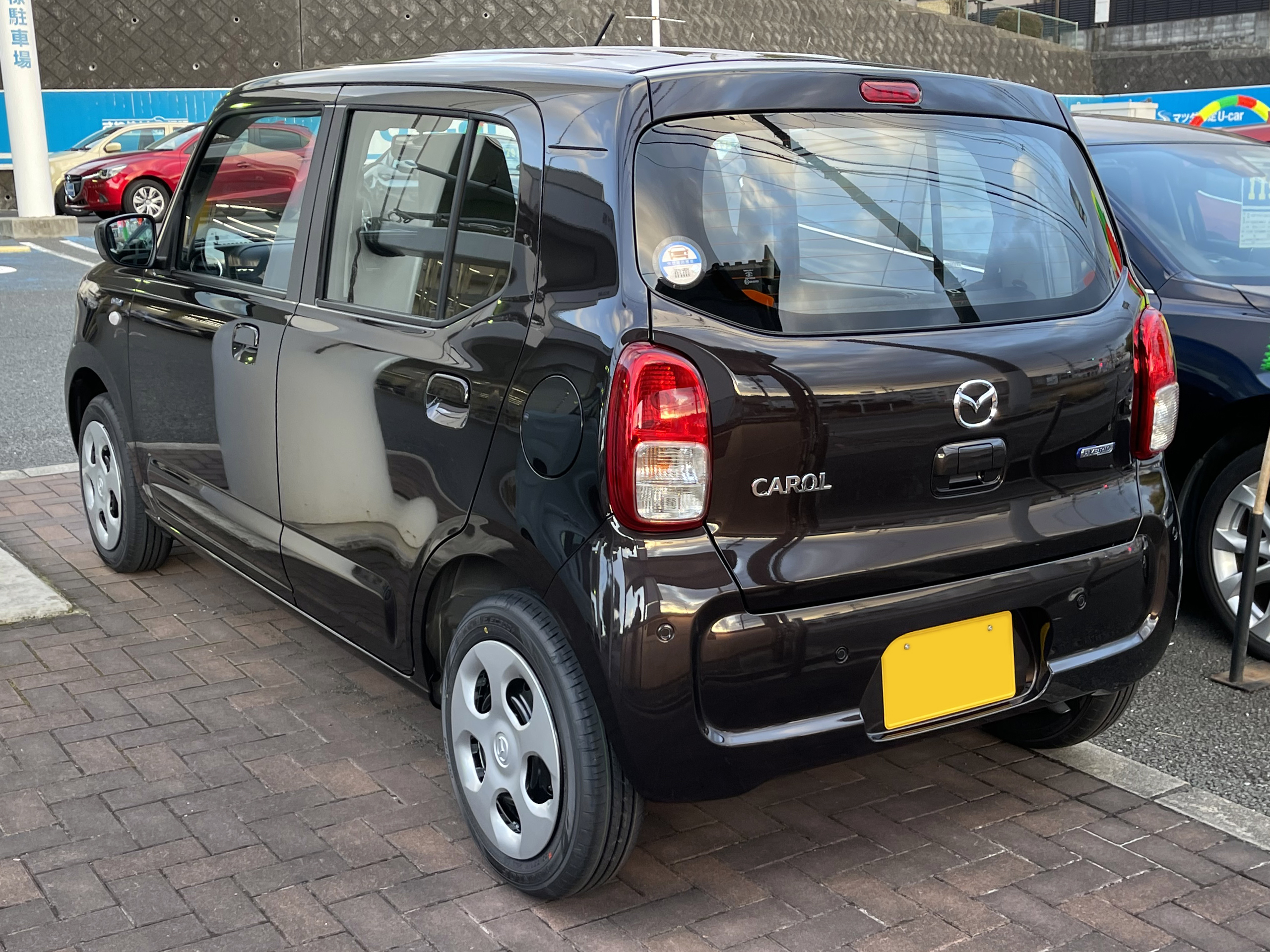
Mazda Carol rear

The eighth-generation Carol is based on the ninth-generation Alto.

The OEM version Mazda Carol was released on 23 December the same year, and went to sale in January 2022. There is no difference with Alto, excpet emblem. The grades are retains from previous models: GS, GX, and GL, and only offered as the hybrid.

In 2025 facelift, the grades has been renamed, with the "HYBRID GX" becoming "HYBRID G," the "HYBRID GS" becoming "HYBRID C," and the "GL" becoming "C", and the "GL Upgrade Package" has been made into the "G."
