= Sunroof =

A sunroof is a movable panel that opens to uncover a window in an automobile roof, allowing light and fresh air to enter the passenger compartment. Sunroofs can be manually operated or motor driven, and are available in many shapes, sizes and styles. While the term "sunroof" is now used generically to describe any moveable panel in the roof, the term "moonroof" was historically used to describe stationary glass panes rigidly mounted in the roof panel over the passenger compartment. A moonroof has a glass panel that is transparent and usually tinted. Previous terms include sunshine roof, sliding head, and sliding roof.

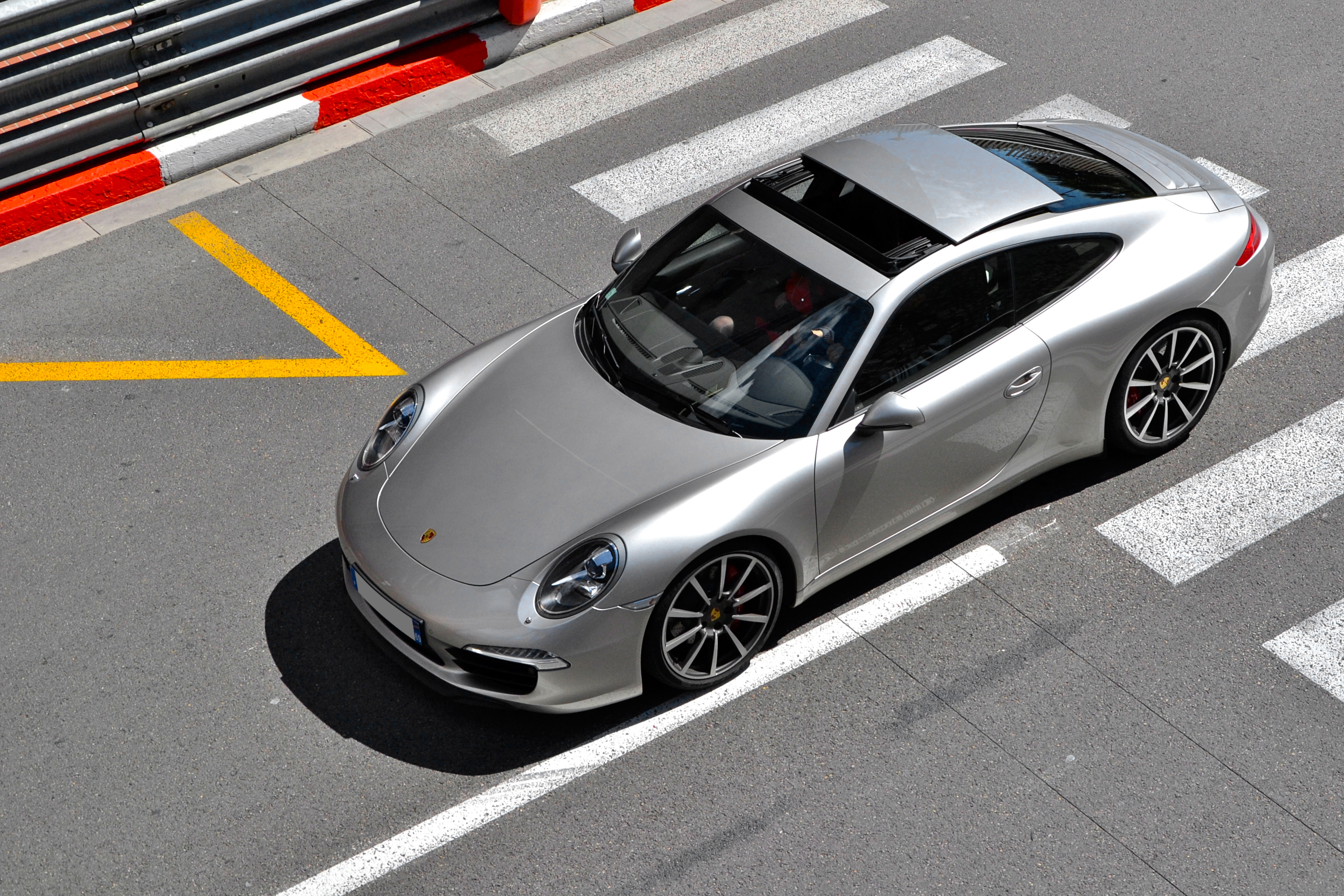
A sliding sunroof on a Porsche 911 Carrera (Type 991)

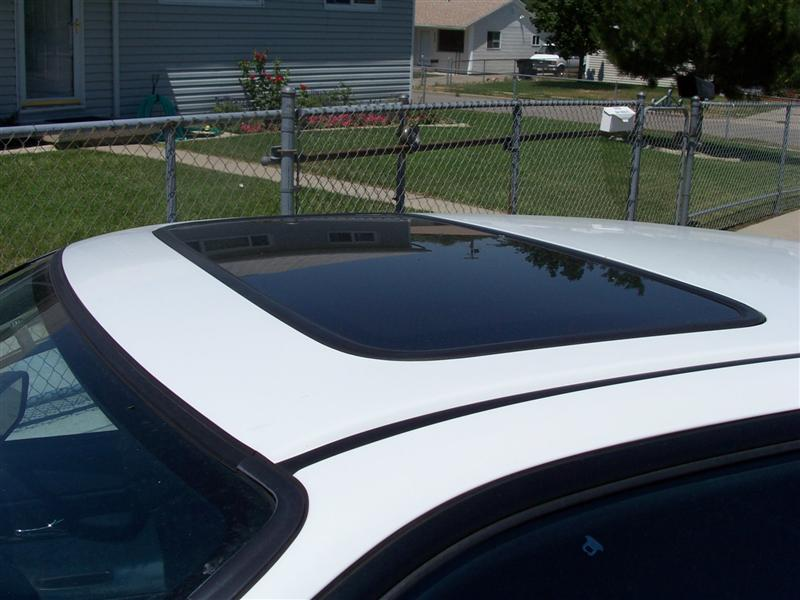
A moonroof on an Acura Integra

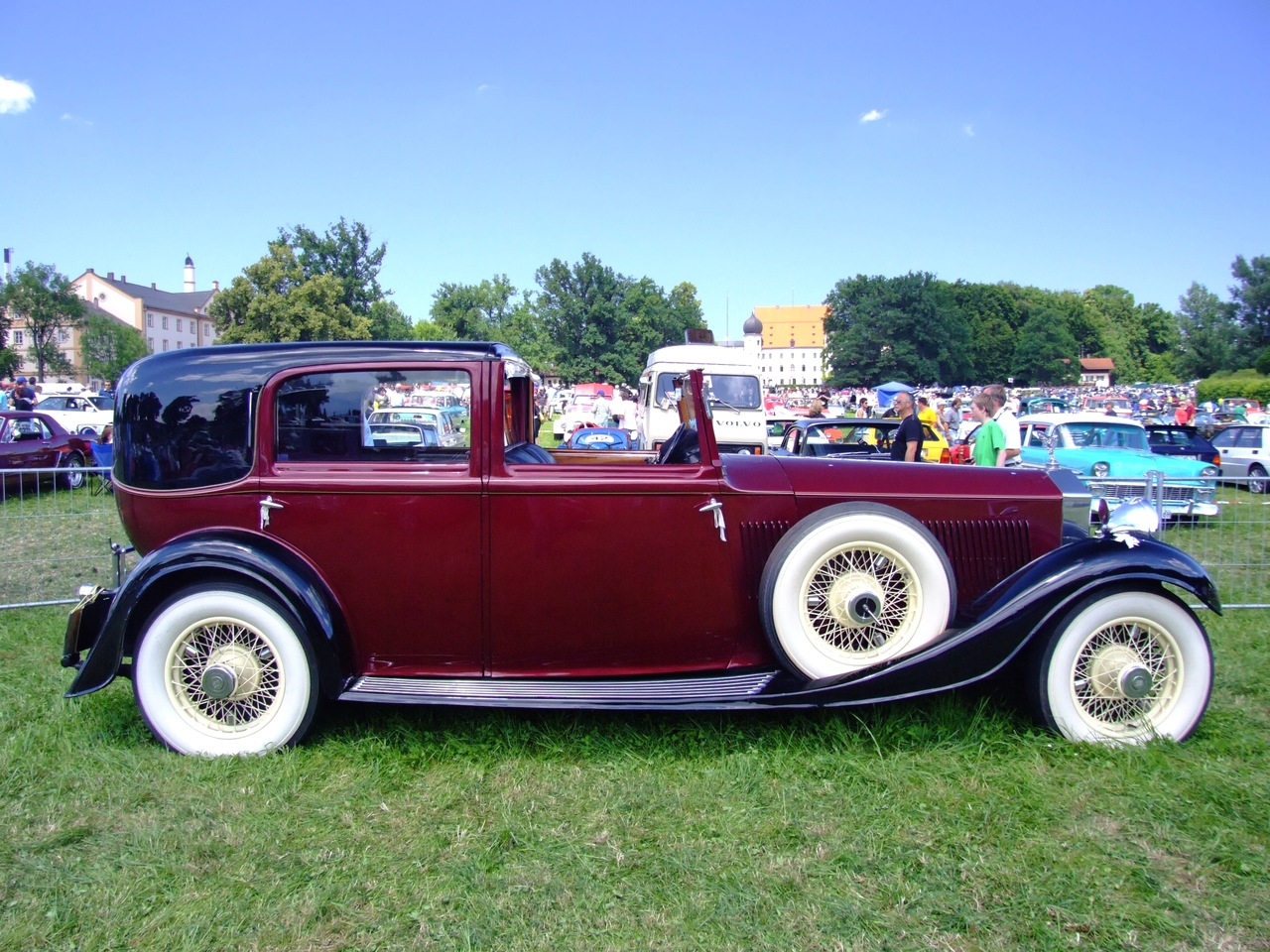
Example of the Sedanca de Ville style body from 1934 with a covered passenger compartment and open chauffeur cabin

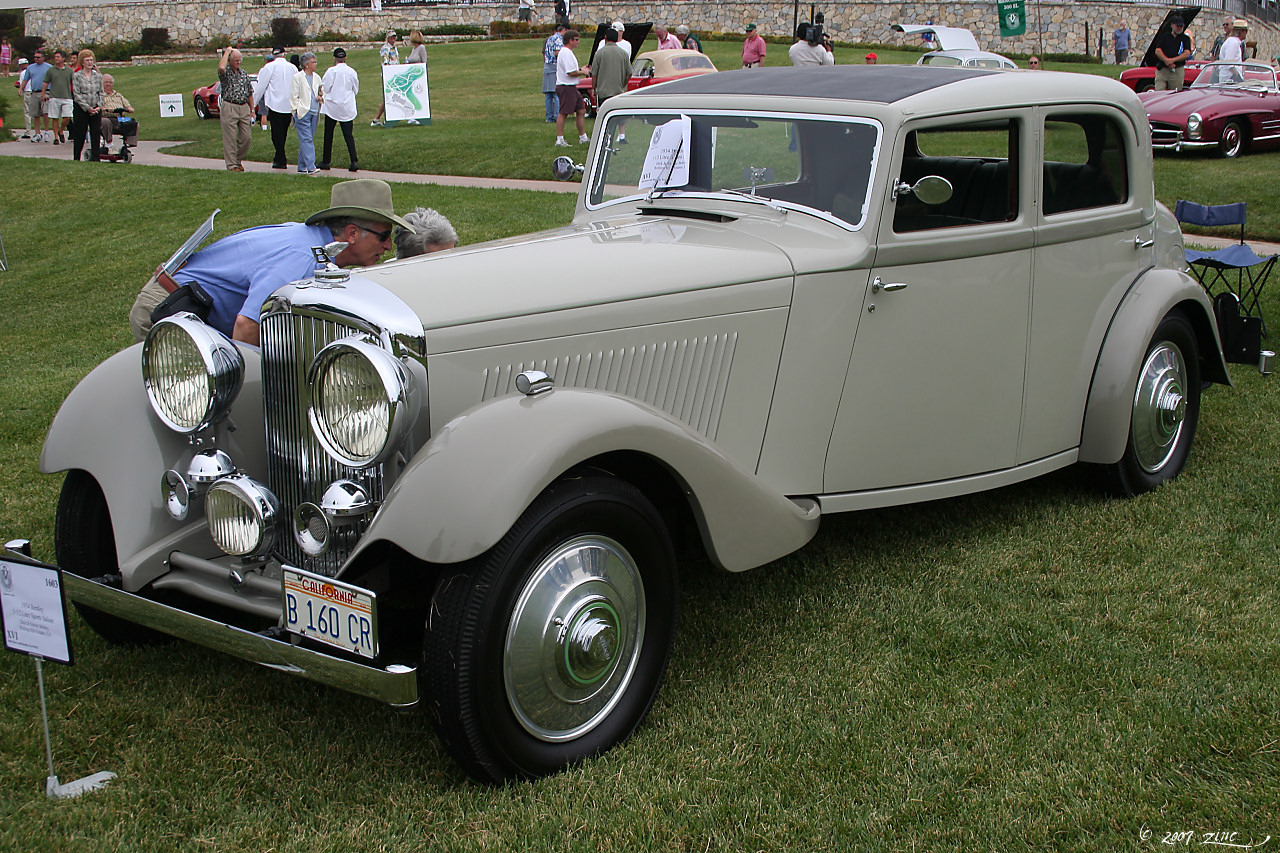
A 1934 Bentley with opening above the driver's compartment resembling the modern Sunroof

== History ==
A common configuration for early automobiles included a fixed roof for the rear passenger compartment and an uncovered section for the chauffeur in a style known as Coupe de Ville, Sedanca (two door) or Sedanca de Ville. An open cabin allowed the driver to be more connected to their surroundings, demonstrated that the car's owner employed a paid driver (one reason chauffeurs wore uniform) and identified the owner through the driver's livery (the other reason for the uniform). Road speeds were increasing and vehicles were changing from occasional use to full-time transport meaning that they were increasingly being used in bad weather. In order to provide better shelter for the driver therefore, temporary cover was now demanded. These part-time roofs, sometimes at first just a stretched piece of leather, became more sophisticated comprising frame elements and leather or water-resistant cloth to form the construction, and installations even included spaces provided to store the parts when not in use.

By the late 1920s, a more convenient version of the temporary roof was often being used where a solid metal panel would slide into a slot at the top of the passenger compartment, sometimes called a de Ville extension. By the early 1930s, cars were being constructed in the Sedan style comprising a metal one-piece roof without the gap above the driver's cabin. To provide a similar facility to the earlier Coup de Ville configurations, sliding cloth or metal panels recognisable as the modern sunroof were regularly fitted to Bentley and Rolls-Royce models built by coach builders such as Barker, Gurney Nutting or Park Ward. In these cars, the continuous roofline, between the windscreen and passenger compartment, was unbroken and so, unlike the Coup de Ville, a coverable opening had to be let into the roof panel itself.

While at first the purpose may still have been to expose the chauffeur, Bentley cars in particular were increasingly sold for owners to drive themselves. Indeed, some models were provided with a sliding panel for the front seats even though the vehicle had just two-seats. Early "Derby" Bentley hard-top models were therefore frequently equipped with sliding sunroof panels, possibly more often than not. The purpose of the sliding panels thus changed from uncovering the chauffeur to allowing the owner to better enjoy their surroundings on fine weather days.

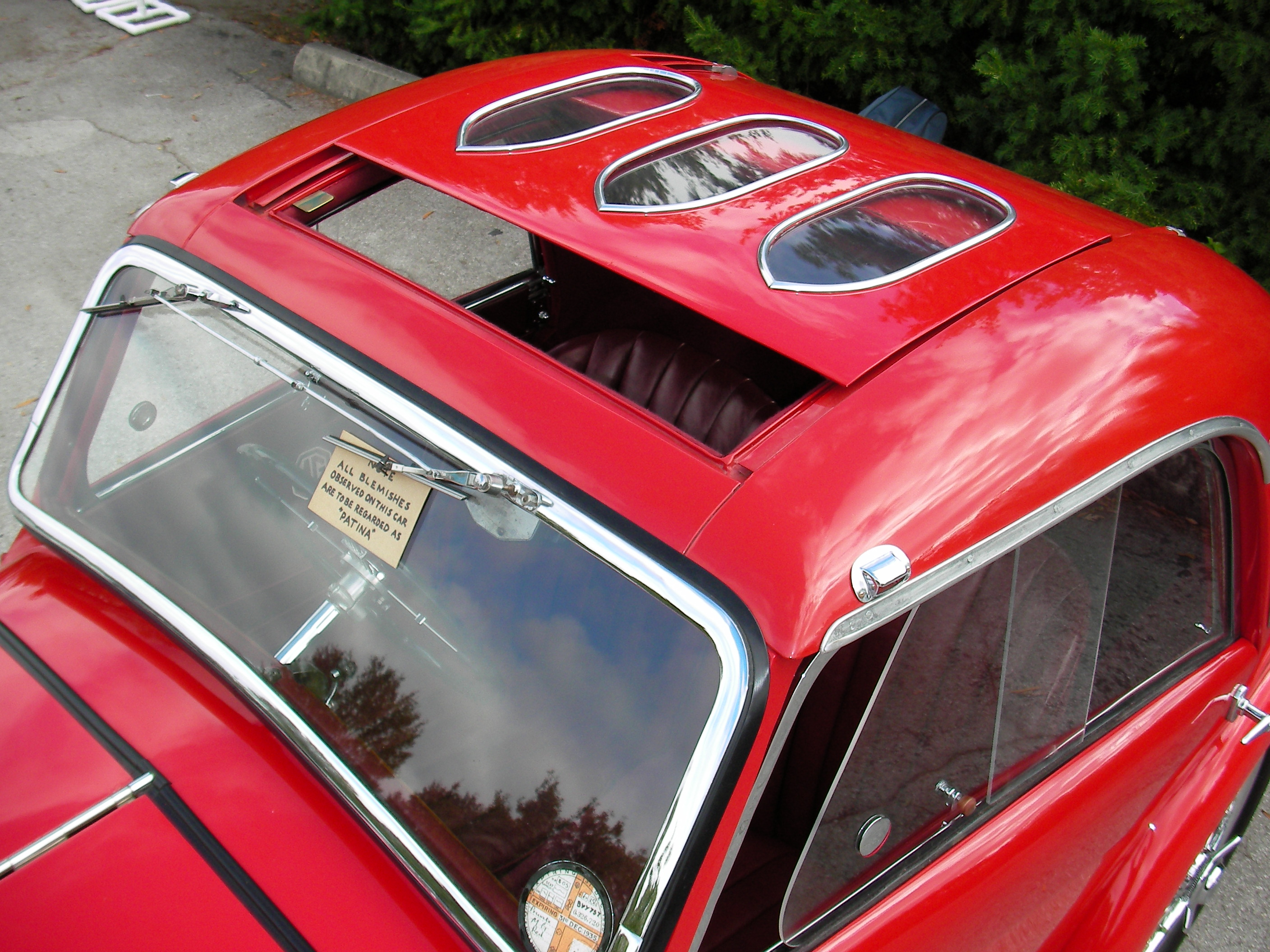
1930s MG coupe including a Sliding Head incorporating glass panels

This evolution was eventually not limited to luxury motoring. The entrepreneur Noel Mobbs laid the foundation of the volume sunroof market when he evolved his coach building business into a company dedicated to the manufacture of sliding roofs in the name of Pytchley. The Pytchley mechanism was both patented and first publicly demonstrated in 1925. At first Pytchley used their sliding roof system to build a number of coach-built, custom "tourer saloon" automobiles sold from their premises at 201 - 203 Great Portland Street London. In 1927 they claimed for a Daimler 20/70 hp that "This roof slides at the touch of a finger and opens up 50% of the roof area giving greater visibility and more air without draughts." The sliding roof system evolved from a device that Pytchley installed themselves, to an option which manufacturers offered as a standard body style. It was factory fitted to vehicles from a number of different manufacturers. By 1929 the design had improved so that when closed the moveable panel was flush with the rest of the roof. Morris built several models using Pytchley's technology from 1932, including the Morris Minor, Morris Major and Morris Ten adding what became known as a Sliding Head (using the term head in the same way as Folding Head or Drop Head). This comprised a panel which could be slid back over the roof behind to create an opening above the driver and passenger. The sliding panel also incorporated locks which allowed the panel to be fixed at any position from fully closed to fully open. By 1935 Wolseley were using the Pytchley roof and by 1936 Austin too were also selling models with the sliding head. The Hillman Minx was another low-cost small car which was clearly not designed to be chauffeured, and in 1931 it was offered in a variety of body styles as was usual at that time, among the options was a sliding roof section including, on the 1933 Aero model with glass panels, as photographed on the 1932 show car, making this the first moonroof. In 1941 Pytchley took on the manufacturer Vauxhall for failure to pay royalties. Vauxhall claimed that their variation of the sliding roof, which slid the panel under the rear section rather than over, was sufficiently different to mean that a license need not be paid. Pytchley won the case.

Variations in moveable, removable and transparent roof panels continued. The Ford Lincoln X-100 concept car of 1953 revisited the Sedanca style for a non-chauffeured vehicle as it had a retractable transparent targa top which inspired later fixed moonroof panels on 1954 production vehicles. In 1961 Triumph launched the TR4 with a removable hard top roof split into two sections. The rear part, incorporating the rear window, could be left on the car when the centre piece was removed creating a Sedanca layout. This concept was resurrected again in 1966 when Porsche launched a version of its 911 sports car that established the term Targa, trademarked by Porsche. This bore even more of a resemblance to the traditional Sedanca form, as the car had both a permanently fixed roll-over hoop, and rear seats. While in 1969 Lamborghini showed the first full-roof framed transparent-panel roof, heralding the modern panoramic roof, on an Espada.

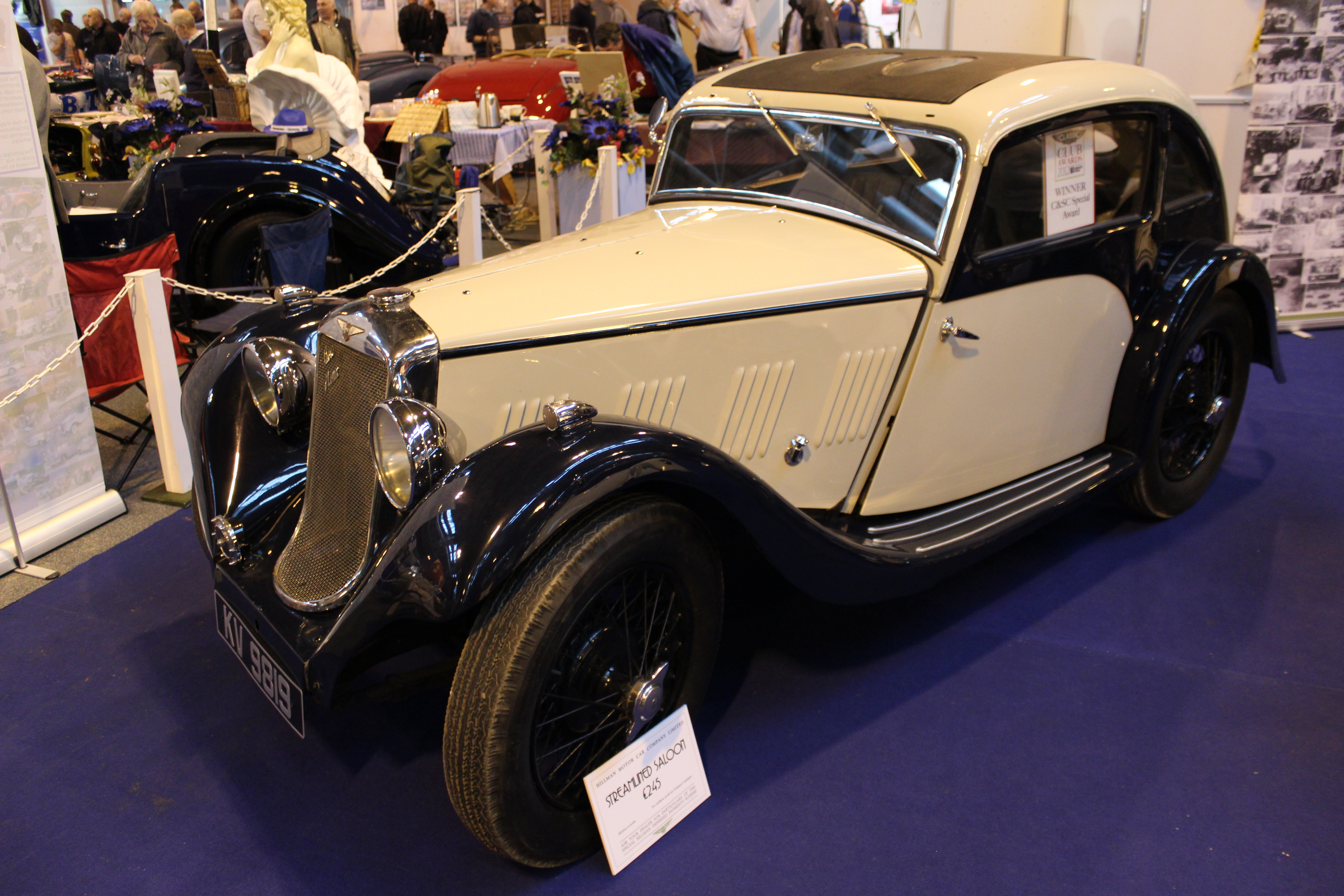
1934 Hillman Aero Minx showing its sliding-panel sunroof with inset glass panels - the world's first moonroof (before the term was coined)

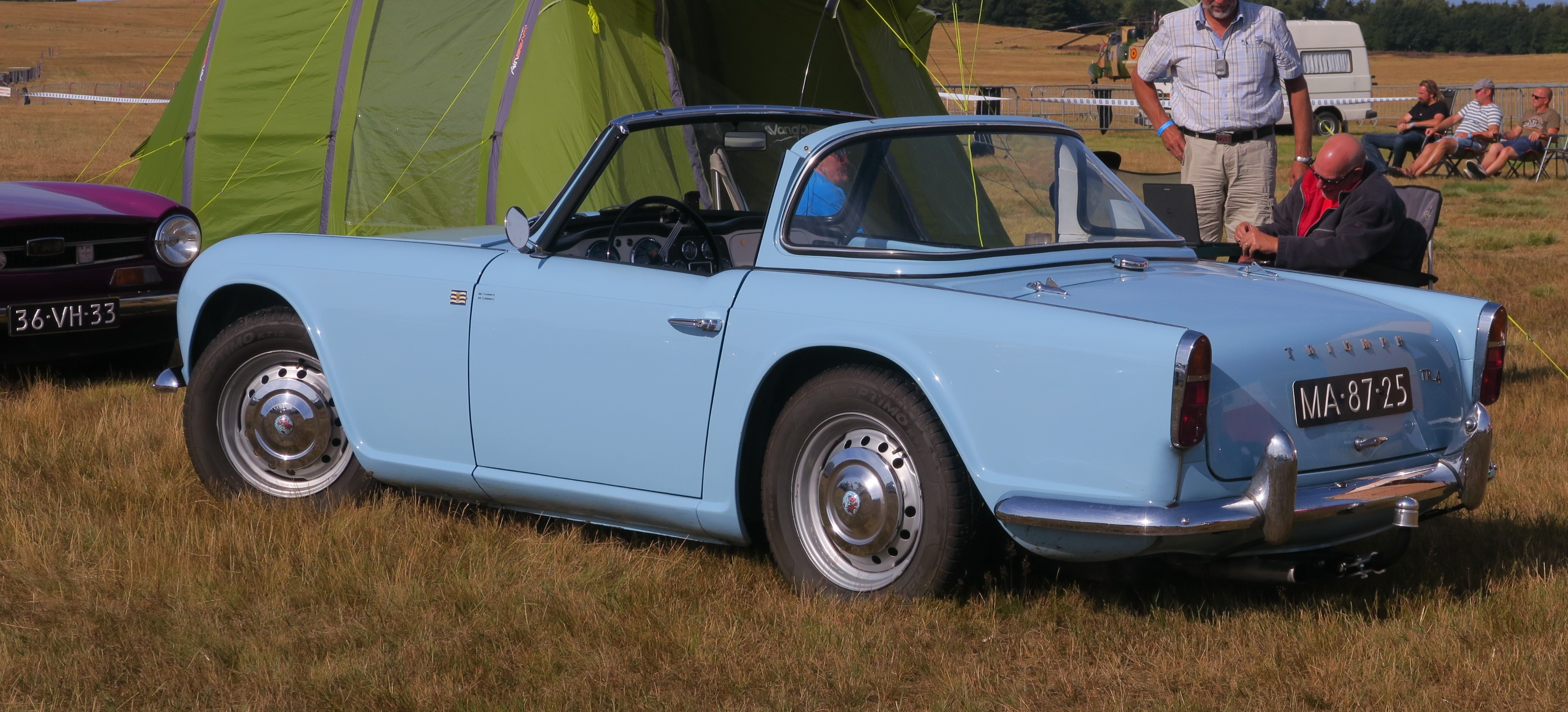
Triumph TR4, the first volume-manufactured Sedanca style body (later commonly called Targa)

Sunroofs, by historical definition are opaque. Today, most factory sliding sunroof options feature a glass panel and are sometimes marketed as moonroofs, a term popularized by automotive manufacturers.

Marketing copy used in ads by Volkswagen in 1962 said, "You get the headroom of a bus. And 23 windows to look out of. And a sun-roof. (Moon-roof after dark.)"

A widely published 1971 Associated Press story about NASA's lunar rover used the word in its headline: "’71 Rover, moonroof, wide tires, low mi., make offer."

Then a 1972 Chevrolet marketing campaign touted moonroofs as a feature available in many of its models. One widely advertised bit of marketing copy said, "You see that rectangle beaming at you from above? That's a moonroof. Not to be confused with a sunroof. (Although many people will undoubtedly be caught using it like one.) A power roof is available on Chevelle and Monte Carlo; a manual one on Nova.” According to the ads, one could also get the feature on the Chevy Malibu.

The term was picked up in 1973 by John Atkinson, a marketing manager at Ford for the Continental Mark IV. For the first year, Ford sent out its Mark IVs to American Sunroof Company for offline installation.

Variations of both the sunroof and moonroof have become the norm in both factory installed and aftermarket offerings, creating a wide range of features and choices. Sunroof systems may be manual or electric, while most moonroof systems are electric/electronic. Manual sunroofs may be lever actuated, as in venting type pop-ups, manual lever or crank operated for sliding systems. Electric roof systems are usually cable driven by a motor and feature some form of sliding opening. Most moonroof systems today are electric and have either a combination pop-up/inbuilt or a pop-up/spoiler configuration (see sunroof types below).

Roof systems may be original equipment, factory options (provided by the car company), or installed aftermarket by a roof installation professional for the car dealer or retail customer. Once the vehicle leaves the assembly line, the factory option can no longer be integrated into the roof, making aftermarket the only option.

== Sunroof types ==
Roof systems are available in many shapes, sizes and styles, and are known by many names. The main types are as follows:

- Pop-up sunroofs are simply a manually operated tilting panel. These panels are sometimes removable, and like T-roofs, must be stored when removed. The tilting action provides a vent in the roof, or a full opening when the panel is removed. Pop-ups can be installed in most vehicles, and are relatively inexpensive. Examples include metal panels in the Porsche 944, the early Mazda RX-7, and many glass panel factory and aftermarket installations.
- Spoiler sunroofs (tilt-&-slides) combine the features of a pop-up with those of a sliding roof system. They tilt to vent and slide open above the roof, requiring little headroom or roof length. Spoilers typically do not provide as large an opening as other roof systems, but offer the convenience of a self-storing panel. Most spoiler roofs are electric, with optional features like integrated sun shades and express open/close. Spoilers are ideal for short-roof vehicles where other types of sliders cannot be installed. Examples include the Honda CRX, the Toyota Celica and the Mazda RX-7.
- Inbuilt sunroof systems have a panel which slides between the metal roof and interior headliner, requiring some loss of headroom but providing a full opening in the roof. All inbuilts slide inside the roof, while some also include a rear venting feature (see pop-up) or express open/close functions. Inbuilts do not fit every vehicle, as the panel must slide and store completely within the vehicle roof. Historically, inbuilts were a metal sunroof panel painted to match the vehicle roof, but now most are glass-panel systems with sliding sunshades (typically referred to as moonroofs). One of the first examples was the 1960 Ford Thunderbird.
- Folding sunroofs (often called rag-tops or cabrio coach) are a European tradition. They offer the convenience of a sunroof, with an opening more like a convertible. The panel is made of fabric (often vinyl), which folds back as it slides open. After a long absence in European and North American markets, folding sunroofs have experienced a resurgence with several new factory-installed options. Aftermarket versions were once only manual, but now are also available in powered versions. Examples include the original VW Beetle, Renault Twingo and Jeep Liberty.
- Top-mount sliding sunroofs (rail mount topslider) have been a popular factory option in Europe for many years. A large glass panel slides open in tracks on top of the roof, with no loss of headroom. Most feature an integral wind deflector to eliminate wind noise. Examples include Donmar's original Skyroof topslider (aftermarket system), the London Taxi and Renault 5 cars.
- Panoramic roof systems are a type of large or multi-panel moonroof which offer openings above both the front and rear seats and may be operable or fixed glass panels. An early example visually very similar to many current versions was paraded around the Monaco Grand Prix circuit in 1969, it comprised a full-length fixed Plexiglas panel and was fitted to a Lamborghini Espada. The first example of a panoramic roof however was incorporated into the 1953 Lincoln XL-500 concept car which sported a full-length Plexiglas bubble canopy. Large operable openings are often accomplished with top-slider (tracks in the top of the roof) or spoiler type mechanisms. Examples include the Acura ZDX, Lexus ES, BMW Mini, Scion tC, Pontiac G6, Mercedes C Class, Volkswagen Eos, Porsche Cayenne, and the Tesla Model S.
- Removable roof panels (t-tops or targa roofs) open a vehicle roof to the side windows, providing a wider opening than other roof systems. The Targa body style is identical in configuration to the Sedanca but is designed for owner-driven rather than chauffeured cars and while a Sedanca style implies a rear passenger area, the Targa does not. T-roofs have two removable panels and leave a T-shaped structural brace in the roof center. Targa roofs include only one (opaque or transparent) panel and leave no cross brace. Aftermarket kits are no longer made, but several companies sell replacement and remanufactured panels, parts and accessories. Examples include Triumph TR4, Porsche 911 Targa, Suzuki Cappuccino, Toyota Supra, Pontiac Firebird, Chevrolet Corvette, Honda NSX, and Porsche 914.
- Solar sunroofs are made of glass, with an inlaid photovoltaic solar panel that makes the glass totally opaque. They operate the same as conventional factory-fitted glass moonroofs (tilting and retracting), but when closed the solar panel provides electricity to power the interior ventilation fans, for cooling the car interior on hot days when the car is standing outside in the sunlight. These are available as a factory option on the 2010 Prius, recent Audi cars, Renault Zoé, and also were available on some versions of the Mazda Millenia and Mazda 929.
- Electric vs. electronic Motorized power roof systems may be operated by a simple push-and-hold switch, or may include an electronic control module (ECM) to provide single-touch express opening, express closing, or auto-closing on ignition off.
- Moonroof is a transparent, usually glass or Plexiglas, sunroof that lets light in while closed. Examples include the Mk1 Ford Fiesta from 1976, the Mk3 Ford Escort from 1980, the Acura ILX, and Pontiac G6. The earliest example, although not called moonroof at the time, was the 1933 Hillman Aero Minx which could be fitted with a sliding roof panel including inset glass. An early use of a large-panel transparent roof section was the 1954 Ford Skyliner and Mercury Sun Valley models which borrowed in-part from the full panoramic roof of the Lincoln XL-500 concept car as well as the X-100. A fixed moonroof exclusively for rear seat passengers was a prominent feature of the Aston Martin Lagonda from series 2, to 4 which was launched in 1976.

== Gallery ==
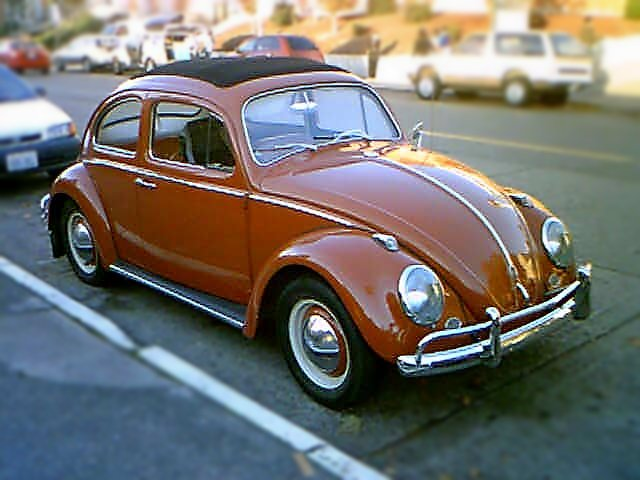
Folding Sunroof on a Volkswagen Beetle

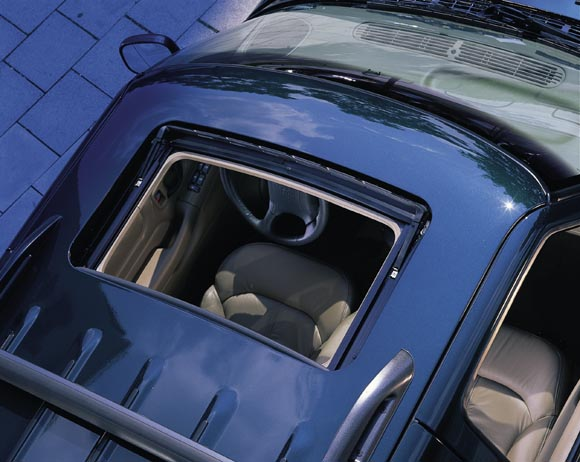
Inbuilt (Moonroof) in Chevy Blazer

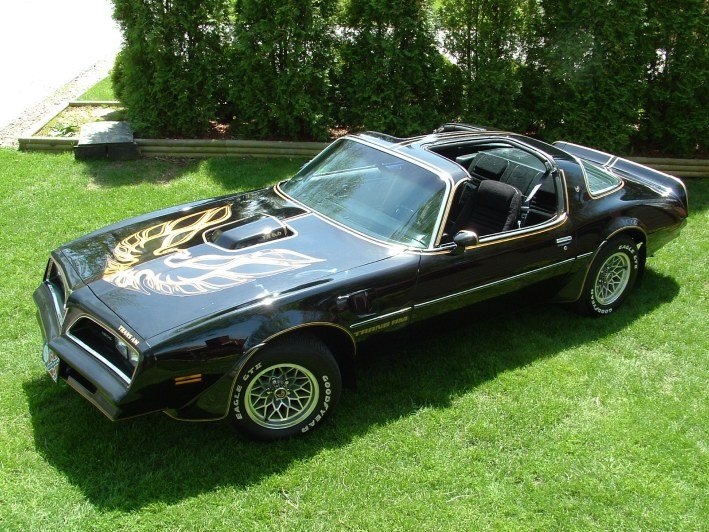
T-Tops in Pontiac TransAm

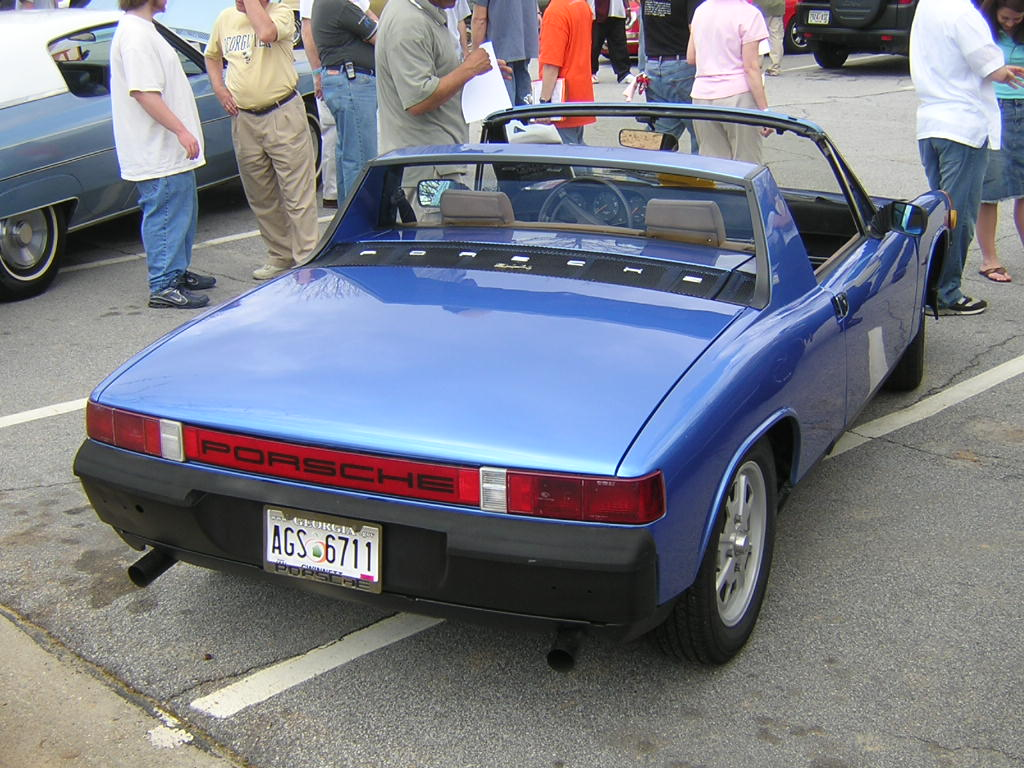
Targa Top in Porsche 914

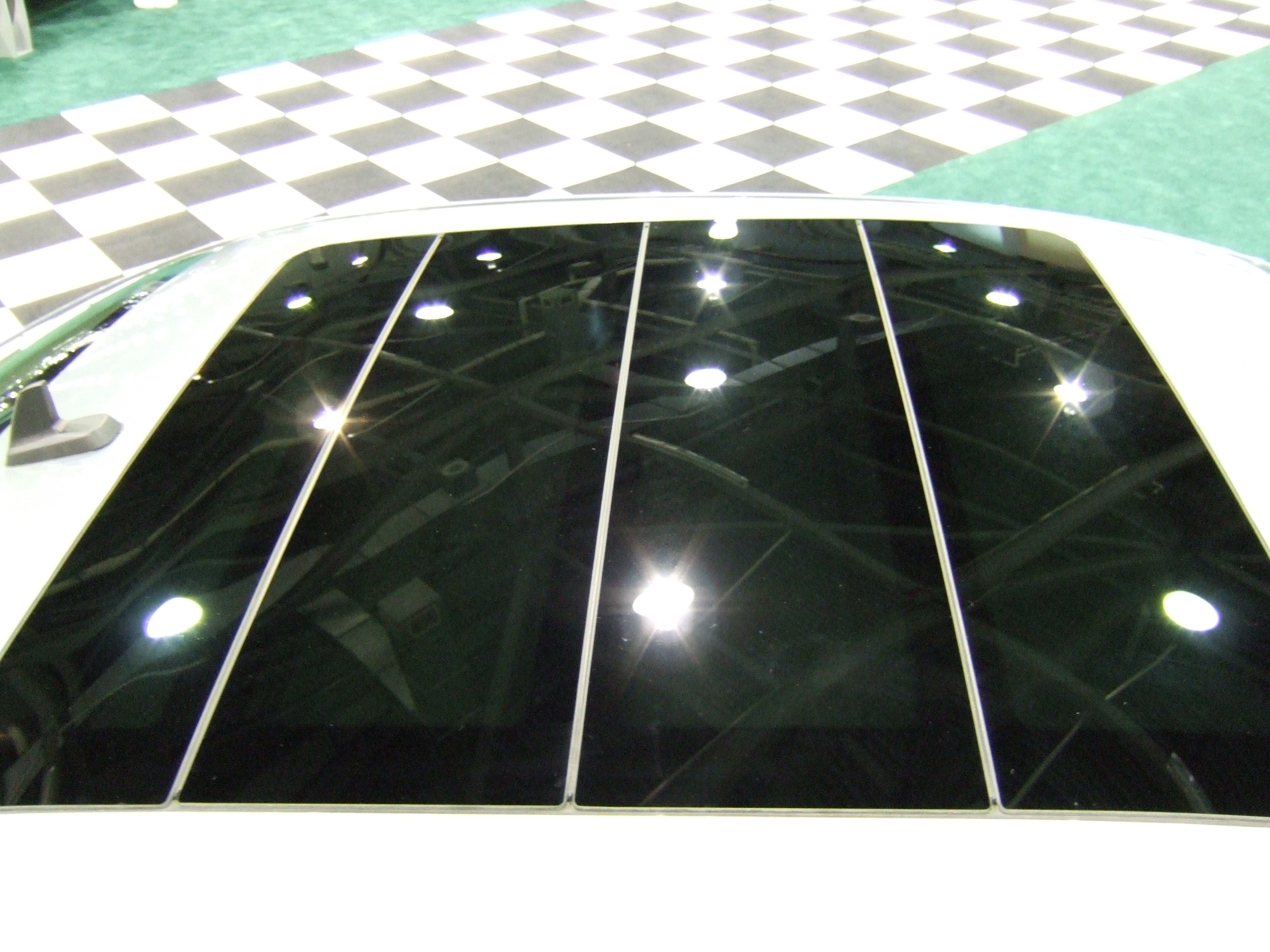
The panoramic roof of a Pontiac G6

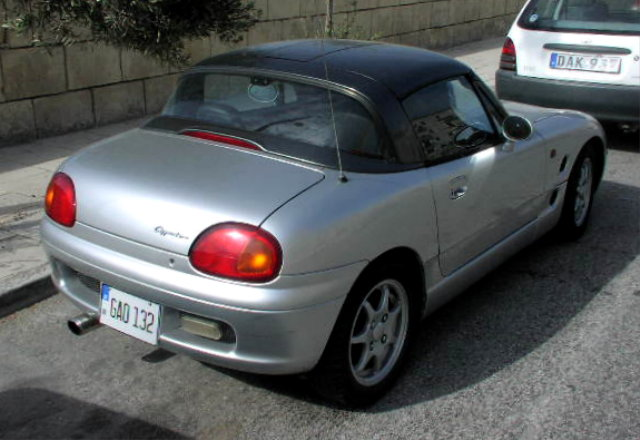
The Suzuki Cappuccino's unusual roof could be configured as a full convertible, Targa, or T-top

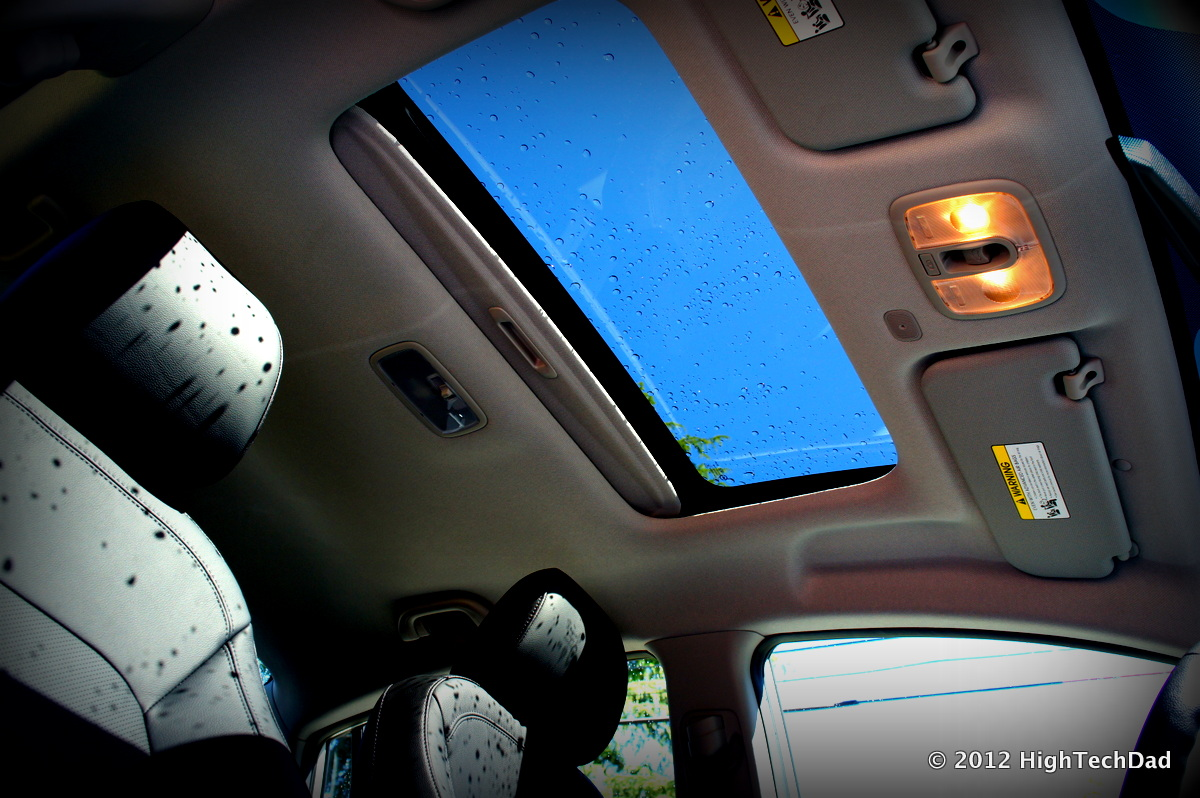
Kia Rio Sunroof

== See also ==
- Convertible
- List of auto parts
- Targa top
