= Autozam Scrum =

Kei truck in Japan by Mazda

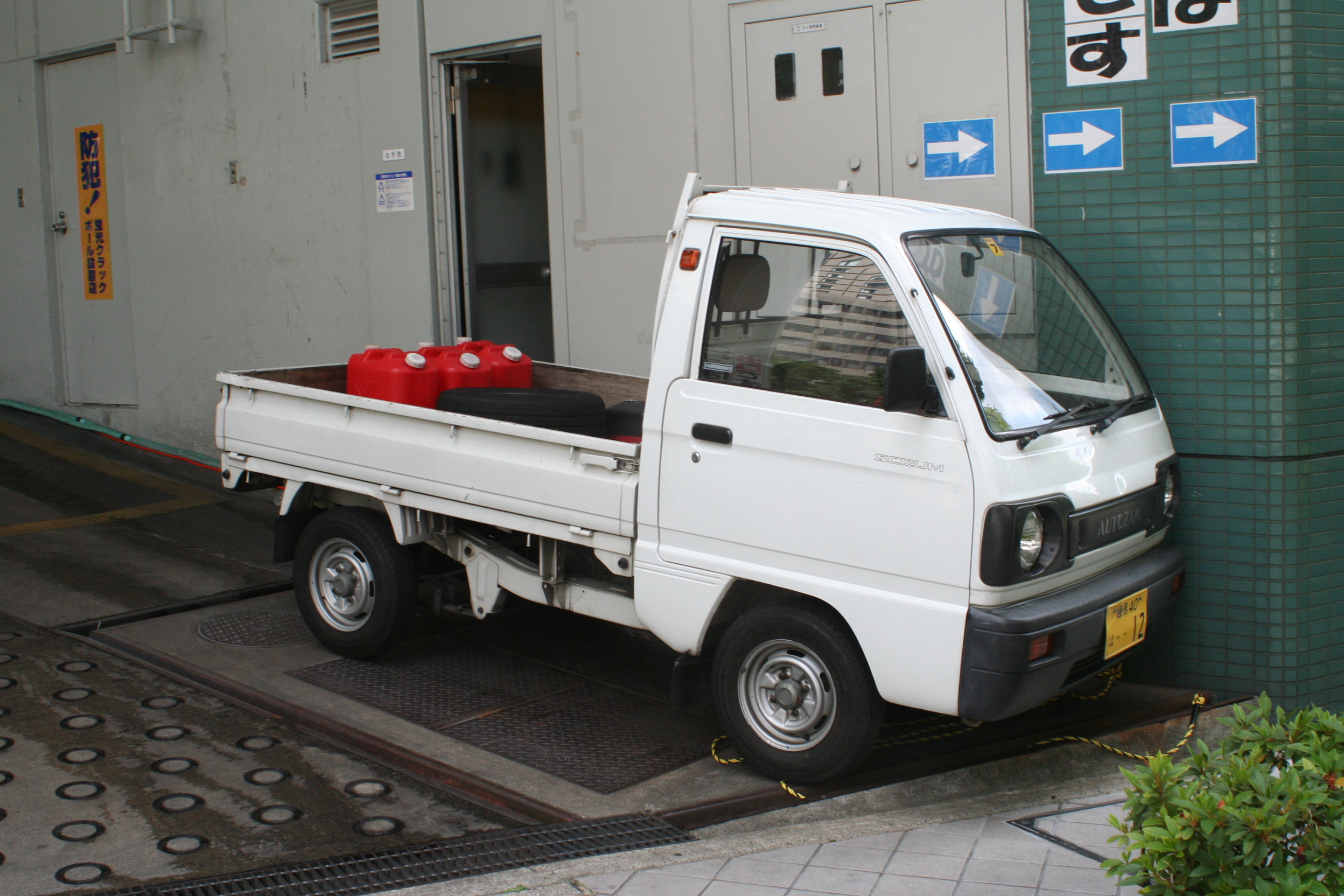
Autozam Scrum Truck (DG51)

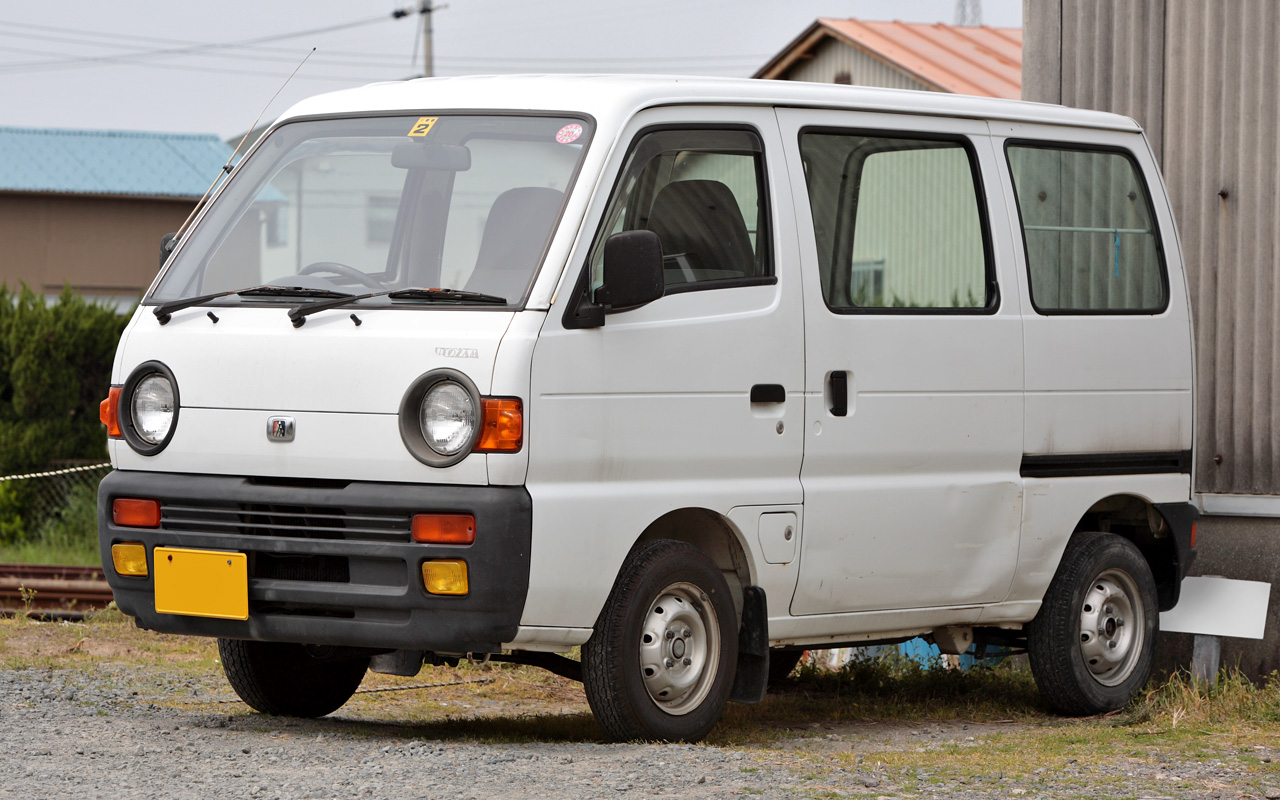
Autozam Scrum Van

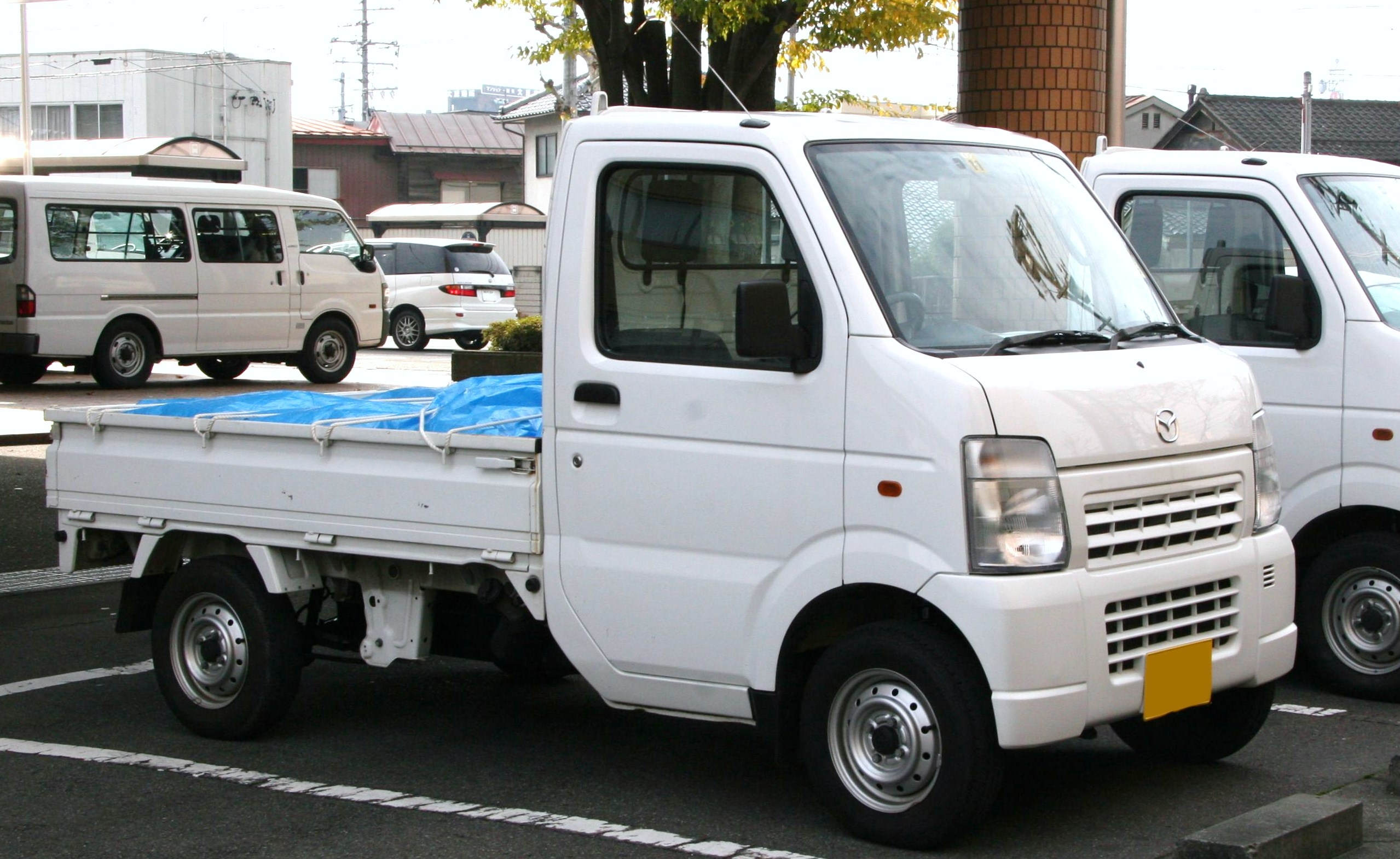
Mazda Scrum Truck

The Autozam Scrum, later known as Mazda Scrum, is a cabover microvan and kei truck sold exclusively in Japan by Japanese automaker Mazda. Originally part of the company's Autozam marque, it was first introduced in June 1989 (DG41, DH41 for 4WD versions). Mazda still sells the Scrum under its own name. The Scrum is a rebadged version of the Suzuki Carry/Every and used Suzuki engines. The first model year had 550-cc Suzuki F5B engines producing 34 PS (25 kW), or 52 PS (38 kW) with an intercooled turbo; after only nine months, this generation was replaced by the larger-engined DG/DH51 (660 cc, 38 PS or 28 kW, 58 PS or 43 kW with a turbo) as the kei car standards were changed that year.

A passenger car version called the Scrum Wagon was added for 2000, while the commercial truck and van were updated.

The Mazda Scrum uses a 660-cc, three-cylinder engine in a variety of specifications including turbocharged, and is available with either four-wheel drive(4WD) or two-wheel drive (2WD). The 4WD version can also be switched between 4WD and 2WD and has high- and low-gear ranges.

The name "scrum" comes from a maneuver from the game of rugby, signifying toughness.
