= Suzuki F engine =

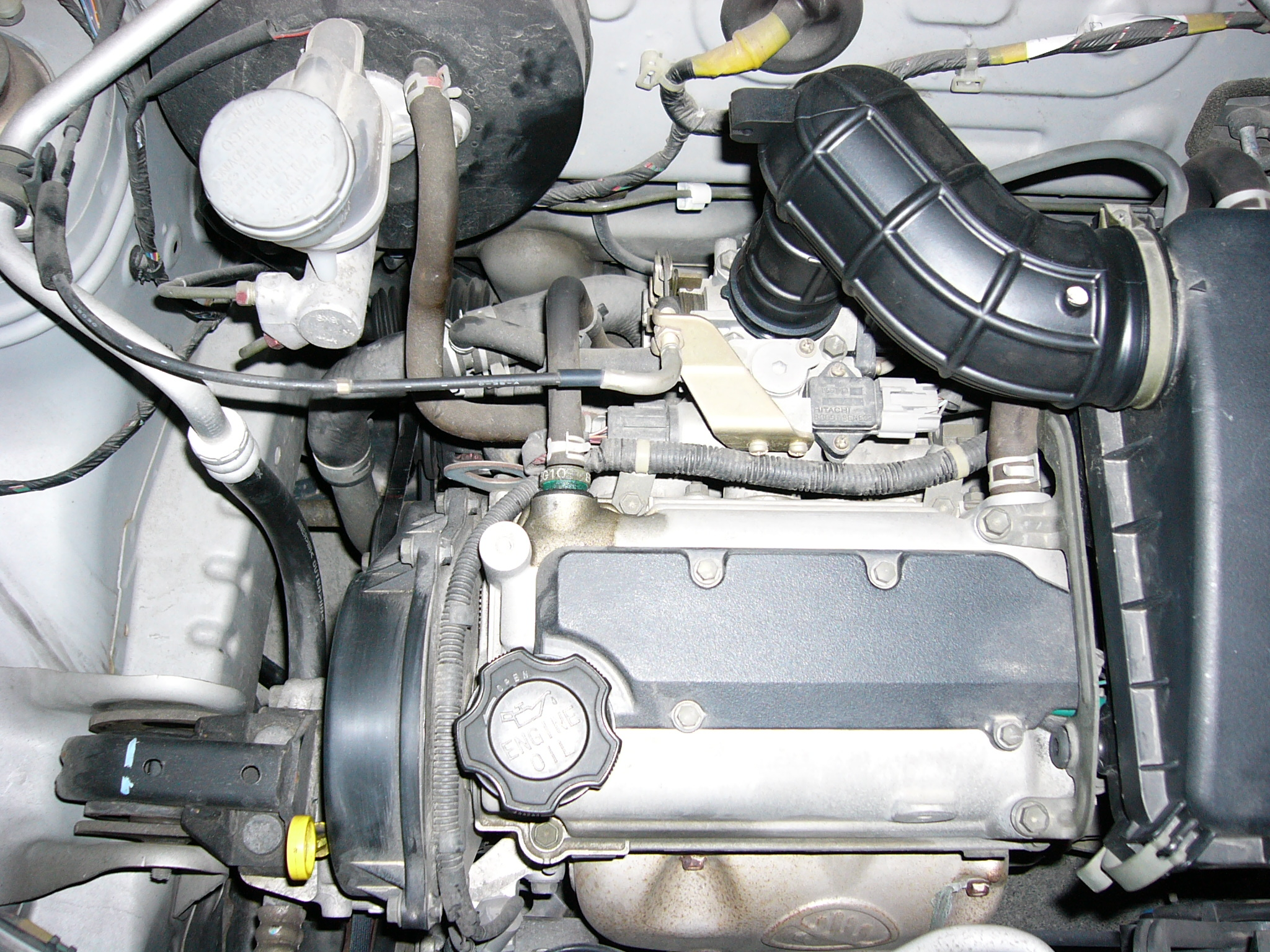
- Suzuki F6A engine

Overview
- Manufacturer: Suzuki
- Production: 1977-2022

Layout
- Configuration: Inline-three; Inline-four
- Displacement: 543 cc (33.1 cu in); 547 cc (33.4 cu in); 657 cc (40.1 cu in); 658 cc (40.2 cu in); 796 cc (48.6 cu in); 797 cc (48.6 cu in); 970 cc (59.2 cu in); 1,061 cc (64.7 cu in)
- Cylinder bore: 62 mm (2.4 in); 65 mm (2.56 in); 65.5 mm (2.58 in); 68.5 mm (2.70 in)
- Piston stroke: 49.6 mm (1.95 in); 55 mm (2.2 in); 60 mm (2.36 in); 66 mm (2.60 in); 72 mm (2.83 in)
- Cylinder block material: Cast Iron
- Cylinder head material: Aluminium Alloy
- Valvetrain: SOHC 2, 3 or 4 valves per cylinder DOHC 4 valves per cylinder
- Compression ratio: 8.0 to 11.0 (Note: Turbocharged: 8.0 to 9.2, naturally aspirated: 8.7 to 11.0)

RPM range
- Max. engine speed: 6500 to 9000 rpm (Note: 550-660 cc: 7500 to 9000 rpm, 800-1100 cc: 6500 to 7000 rpm.)

Combustion
- Supercharger: F5A only
- Turbocharger: In some 550 and 660 cc variants
- Fuel system: Carburetor; Fuel injection
- Fuel type: Petrol
- Oil system: Wet sump
- Cooling system: Water-cooled

Output
- Power output: 28–64 PS (21–47 kW; 28–63 hp) at 5500 to 7500 rpm
- Torque output: 41–91 N⋅m (4–9 kg⋅m; 30–67 lb⋅ft) at 2500 to 6000 rpm

Chronology
- Predecessor: T5A/B engine
- Successor: Suzuki K engine

The Suzuki F engine is a series of inline three- and four-cylinder internal combustion petrol engines manufactured by Suzuki Motor Corporation and also licensed by many manufacturers for their automobiles. This engine was Suzuki's first four-stroke car engine when it first appeared in 1977.

== Three-cylinder ==
=== F5A ===
The smallest F engine family with 543 cc of displacement, bore and stroke size is 62 mm × 60 mm. The F5A was basically a three-cylinder version of the F8A four-cylinder engine, without the fourth cylinder and the stroke reduced from 66 to 60 mm. Available in various versions with 6, 9, or 12 valves and SOHC or DOHC head designs, carburettor or fuel injection and naturally aspirated, turbocharged, or supercharged.

- Max power: 28–64 PS (21–47 kW; 28–63 hp)
- Max torque: 41–86 N⋅m (4–9 kg⋅m; 30–63 lbf⋅ft)

Applications:

- SOHC 6-valve
  - 1980–1988 Suzuki Alto SS40/CA71/CA72
  - 1980–1989 Suzuki Carry/Every ST40/DA71
  - 1981–1988 Suzuki Fronte SS40/CB71/CB72
  - 1982–1988 Suzuki Cervo SS40C
  - 1983–1988 Suzuki Mighty Boy SS40T
- SOHC 6-valve with turbocharger
  - 1985–1987 Suzuki Cervo SS40C
  - 1985–1988 Suzuki Alto CA71/72
  - 1986–1990 Suzuki Jimny JA71
  - 1987–1989 Suzuki Every DA71V
- SOHC 9-valve
  - 1987–1989 Suzuki Every DA71V
- SOHC 9-valve with supercharger
  - 1987–1989 Suzuki Carry DA71T
- DOHC 12-valve
  - 1986–1988 Suzuki Alto CA72V/CC72V
  - 1987–1988 Suzuki Fronte CB72S
- DOHC 12-valve with turbocharger
  - 1987–1988 Suzuki Alto Works CA72V/CC72V

=== F5B ===
This 547 cc engine is the successor of the earlier F5A engine, with the bore and stroke size increased to 65 x 55 mm. It was available with 6 or 12-valve SOHC/DOHC head designs. Naturally aspirated and also turbocharged models, with an available intercooler, were on offer. These engines were only used between 1989 and 1990, after which the Japanese government changed the maximum displacement for kei cars up to 660 cc.

- Max power: 34–64 PS (25–47 kW; 34–63 hp) at 6500 to 7500 rpm
- Max torque: 42–76 N⋅m (4–8 kg⋅m; 31–56 lbf⋅ft) at 4000 to 6000 rpm

Applications:

- SOHC 6-valve
  - 1989–1990 Autozam Scrum DG41
  - 1989–1990 Suzuki Carry/Every DA41
  - 1988–1990 Suzuki Alto CL11
- SOHC 6-valve with turbocharger
  - 1989–1990 Autozam Scrum DG41
  - 1989–1990 Suzuki Carry/Every DA41
  - 1988–1990 Suzuki Alto Works S CL11
- SOHC 12-valve
  - 1989–1990 Autozam Carol AA5
  - 1988–1990 Suzuki Alto CL11
  - 1988–1990 Suzuki Cervo CG72
  - 1988–1989 Suzuki Fronte CN11S
- DOHC 12-valve
  - 1988–1990 Suzuki Alto CL11
- DOHC 12-valve with turbocharger
  - 1988–1990 Suzuki Alto Works RS CL11

=== F6A ===
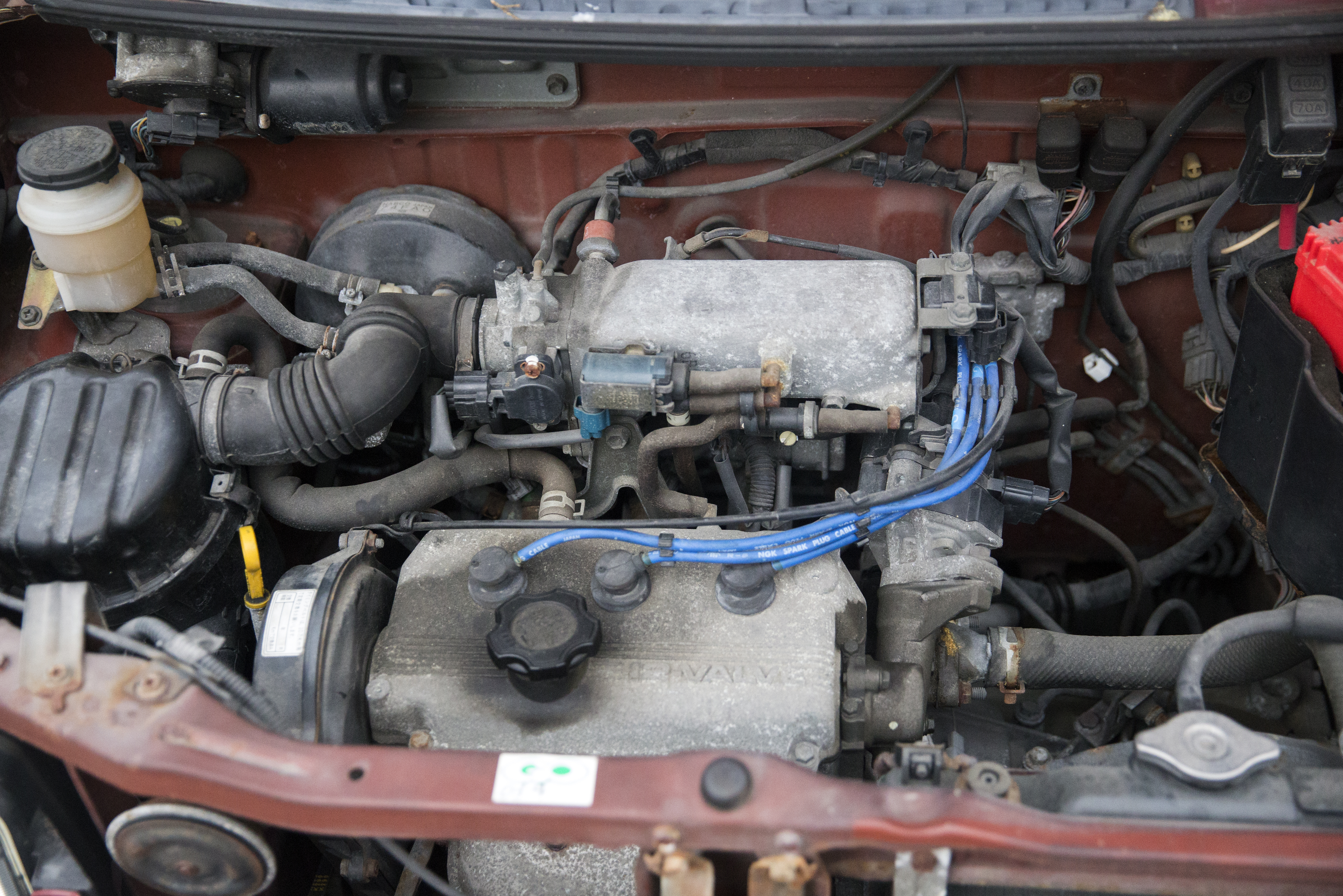
The fuel injected, 12-valve version of the F6A in a Suzuki Wagon R

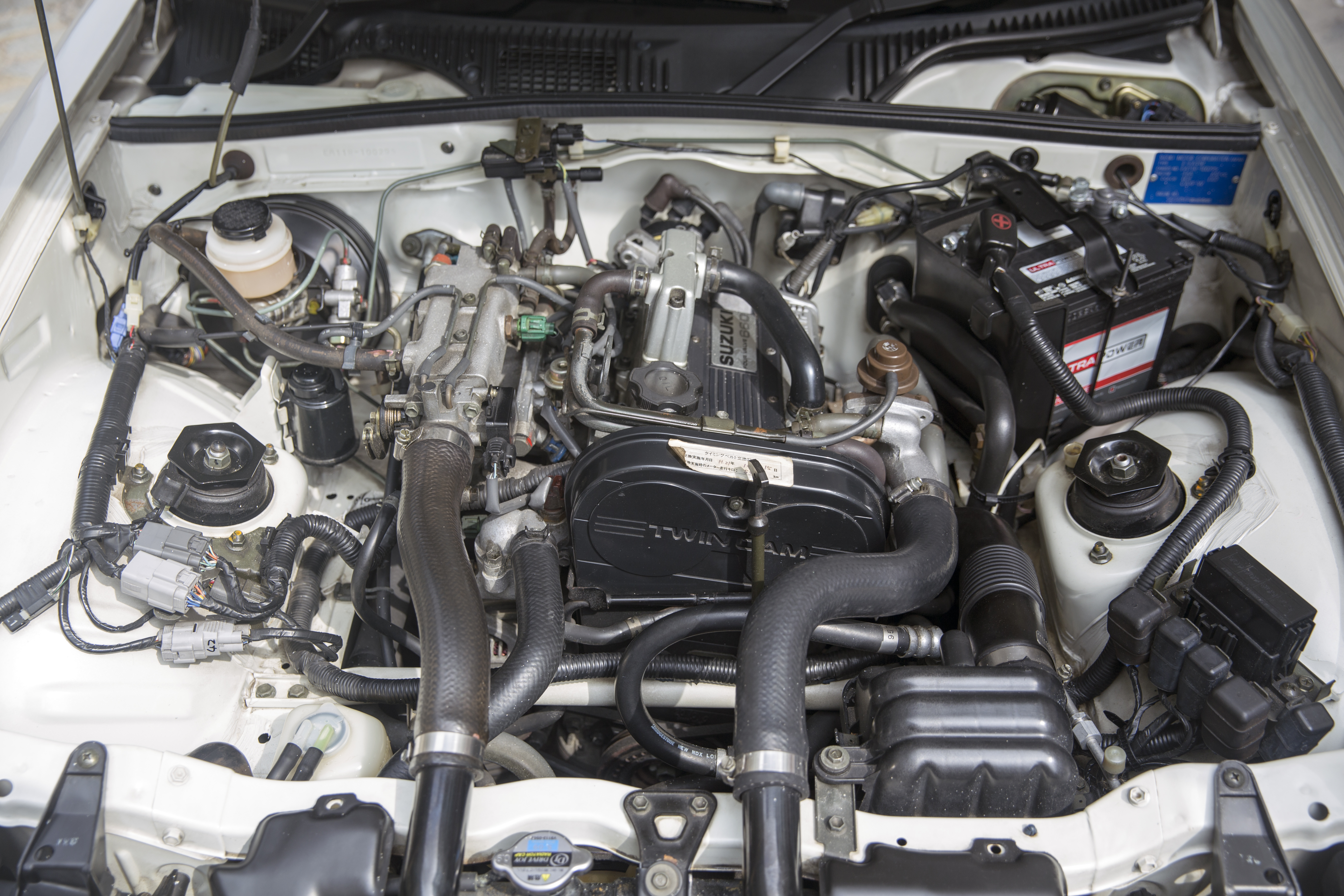
The twin cam, turbocharged 12-valve F6A engine longitudinally mounted in a Cappuccino

This 657 cc engine was introduced in 1990. Based on the old 550 cc F5B engine, it retains the 65 mm bore, but with new 66 mm stroke size.

- Max power: 36–64 PS (26–47 kW; 36–63 hp) at 6000 to 7000 rpm
- Max torque: 50–90 N⋅m (5–9 kg⋅m; 37–66 lbf⋅ft) at 3500 to 4000 rpm

Applications:

- SOHC 6-valve
  - 1990–1998 Autozam/Mazda Scrum DG51
  - 1990–1998 Autozam/Mazda Carol AA6/AC6
  - 1990–1998 Suzuki Alto CL22/HA11
  - 1990–1998 Suzuki Carry/Every DA/DC51
  - 1994–1998 Suzuki Cervo Mode CN21
- SOHC 6-valve with turbocharger
  - 1990–1998 Suzuki Cervo Mode CN21
  - 1990–1998 Suzuki Jimny JA11/12
  - 1990–2000 Autozam/Mazda Scrum DG51/52
  - 1990–2000 Suzuki Carry/Every DA/DC/DE51-52
  - 1999–2000 Suzuki Carry DA/DB52
  - 1991–2000 Autozam/Mazda Carol AA64/AC6P/HB12
  - 1991–2000 Suzuki Alto Works i.e. CL21/HA11-12
  - 1993–1998 Suzuki Wagon R CT21
  - 1998–2000 Suzuki Kei HN11S/Mazda Laputa HP11S
- SOHC 12-valve
  - 1990–1998 Suzuki Cervo Mode CN22
  - 1990–2000 Autozam/Mazda Carol AA64/AC6/HB12
  - 1990–2000 Suzuki Alto CL22/HB11-12
  - 1996–2000 Mitsuoka Ray
  - 1997–2000 Autozam/Mazda Scrum DL51/DG52
  - 1997–2000 Suzuki Carry/Every DA51/52
  - 1993–1998 Suzuki Wagon R CT21
- DOHC 12-valve with turbocharger
  - 1991–1994 Suzuki Alto Works RS CL22
  - 1992–1994 Autozam AZ-1 PG66SA/Suzuki Cara PG66SS
  - 1991–1995 Suzuki Cappuccino EA11R

=== F8B ===
A SOHC 6-valve 796 cc engine, bore and stroke size is 68.5 mm × 72 mm. This engine has never been offered in Japan and was originally intended for export models of the Suzuki Alto. This engine has since become widely available in India, Pakistan, and China, where it has been installed in a wide variety of vehicles. Originally, this engine used a carburettor, which was later removed to improve fuel efficiency and performance. The transition to Multi-Point Fuel Injection (MPFI) technology enabled more precise control of the air–fuel mixture, resulting in cleaner emissions and improved engine performance.

- Max power: 35–40 PS (26–29 kW; 35–39 hp) at 5000 to 5500 rpm
- Max torque: 62 N⋅m (46 lb⋅ft) at 3000 rpm

Applications:

- 1981–1994 Suzuki Alto 800 SS80/SB308/CA91
- 1983–1988 Suzuki FX (Pakistan)
- 1983–2014 Maruti 800
- 1983–2024 Suzuki Bolan/Ravi (Pakistan)
- 1984–2019 Maruti Omni (India)
- 1988–2019 Suzuki Mehran (Pakistan)
- 1990s Jilin JL1010/63xx (China)
- 1990s–2000s Changan SC10xx/63xx (China)
- 1990s–2001 Xi'an Qinchuan Alto (China)
- 1992–2008 Changan Alto (China)
- 1994–2001 Anhui Anchi MC6330E (China)
- 2000s–2010s Jiangnan Alto/Zotye TT (China)

=== F8C ===
Licensed F8B engine by Daewoo Motors for their own vehicles, as a part of technical tie-up between Suzuki and Daewoo in 1991.

- Max power: 41–52 PS (30–38 kW; 40–51 hp) at 5500 to 6000 rpm
- Max torque: 59–71 N⋅m (6–7 kg⋅m; 44–52 lbf⋅ft) at 2500 to 4500 rpm

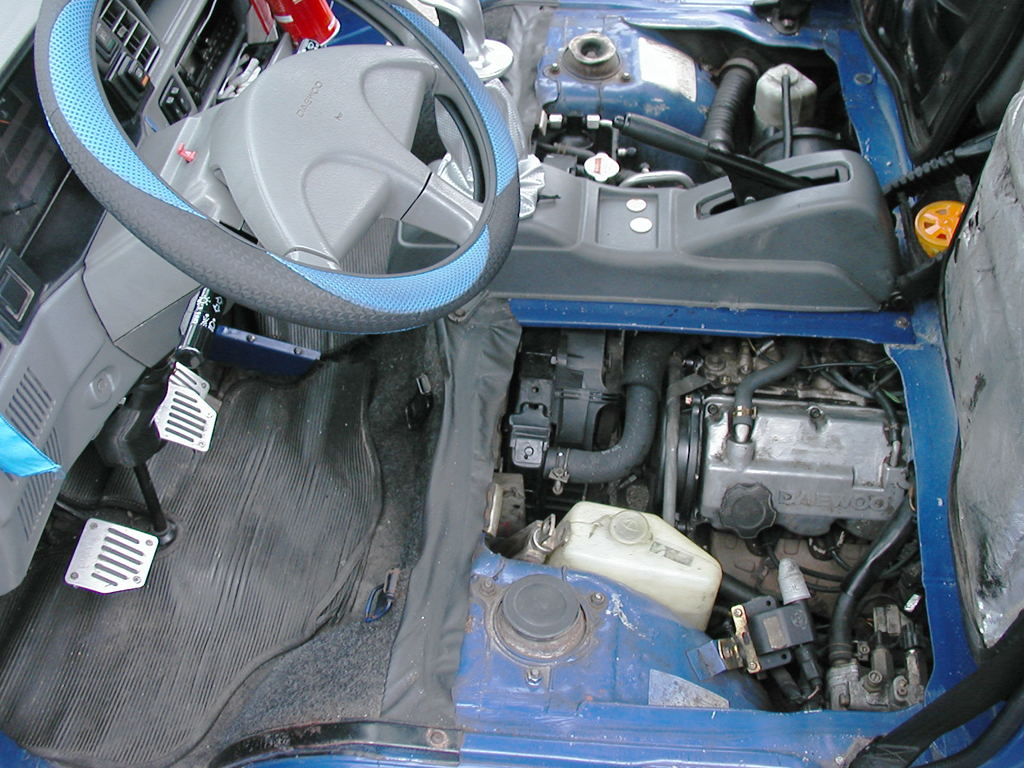
Daewoo F8C engine

Applications:

- 1991–2001 Daewoo Tico/Fino
- 1991–2021 Daewoo Damas/Labo/Attivo (also labelled as Chevrolet CMV/CMP)
- 1998–2010 Daewoo Matiz/Chevrolet Spark

=== F8D ===
The SOHC 12-valve version of F8B engine, developed by Maruti Suzuki in India, introduced in 2000. This engine is also the cleanest in the family, as it was able to meet Bharat Stage VI emission standard in April 2020, which is equivalent to Euro 6 emission standard.

- Max power: 47 PS (35 kW; 46 hp) at 6000 rpm
- Max torque: 69 N⋅m (7 kg⋅m; 51 lbf⋅ft) at 3500 rpm

Applications:

- 2000–2003 Maruti 800
- 2000–2022 Maruti Suzuki Alto 800

== Four-cylinder ==
=== F6B ===
The 658 cc F6B engine is the smallest four-cylinder engine in the family and also the only one with DOHC 16-valve valvetrain design. This engine is also the only one with turbocharger and intercooler within the four-cylinder variant. The bore and stroke size is 65 mm × 49.6 mm (2.56 in × 1.95 in). This engine shared the same 65 mm bore size of the three-cylinder F6A, although the stroke was shortened to 49.6 mm to keep the displacement nearly the same as the three-cylinder F6A, even with the additional fourth cylinder.

- Max power: 64 PS (47 kW; 63 hp) at 7000 rpm
- Max torque: 82 N⋅m (8 kg⋅m; 60 lbf⋅ft) at 3500 rpm

Application:

- January 1990–May 1997 Suzuki Cervo Mode SR-Four CN31

=== F8A ===
A 797 cc with 62 mm x 66 mm bore and stroke size. The cylinder head design is SOHC 8-valve. This was Suzuki's first four-stroke car engine and also the oldest in the family.

- Max power: 42 PS (31 kW; 41 hp) at 5500 rpm
- Max torque: 60 N⋅m (6 kg⋅m; 44 lbf⋅ft) at 3500 rpm

Applications:

- 1977–1981 Suzuki Jimny 8 (SJ20/LJ80)
- 1977–1989 Suzuki Carry ST80-90/SK408
- 1977–1982 Suzuki Cervo SC80 (Chile)
- 1980s Jilin JL110 (China)
- 1980s–2000s Changan SC10xx/63xx (China)
- 1985–1992 Ford Pronto (Taiwan)

=== F10A ===
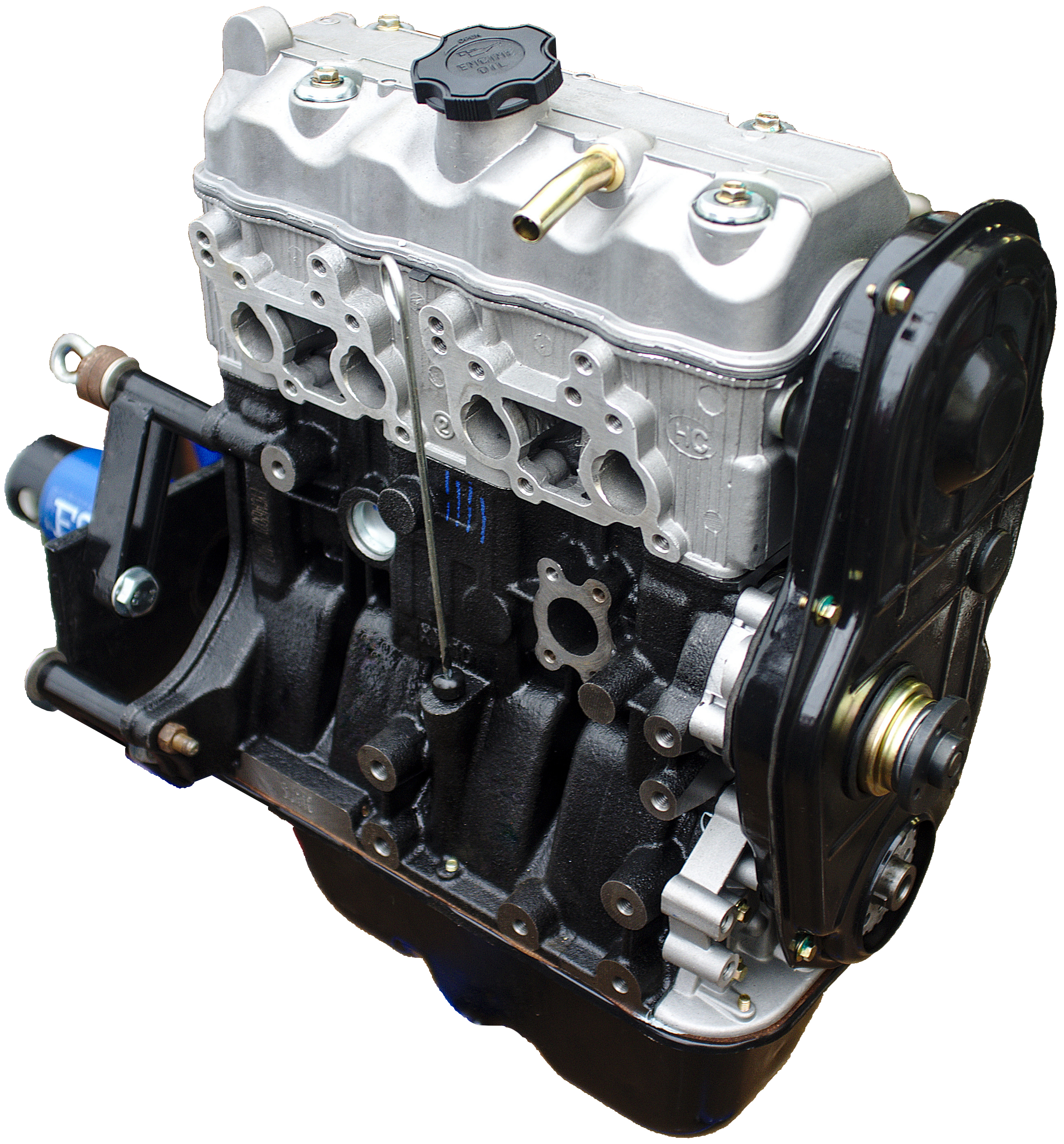
Suzuki F10A engine, manufactured in China.

This is a 970 cc, SOHC 8-valve engine version of F engine. The bore and stroke size is 65.5 mm x 72 mm. F10A is also the longest running F engine family. Debuted in 1978 Suzuki SC100, but most of the applications were ceased at least until late 1990s for international market with stricter emission regulation, such as in Europe. In 2005, this engine was upgraded with fuel injection and catalytic converter to meet Euro 2 emission standard for Indonesian market Suzuki Carry 1.0. In 2017, this engine was upgraded again to meet the Euro 4 emission standard for Vietnamese market Suzuki Super Carry. As of December 2020, F10A is still available in Vietnam and Myanmar.

- Max power: 40–60 PS (29–44 kW; 39–59 hp) at 5500 rpm
- Max torque: 62–78 N⋅m (6–8 kg⋅m; 46–58 lbf⋅ft) at 3000–4000 rpm

Applications:

- 1978–1982 Suzuki SC100
- 1982–2006 Suzuki Jimny 1000/Samurai 1.0/Katana/Potohar SJ410 (Note: International version of SJ410 Jimny was discontinued in late 1980s, but both Indonesian built Jimny (including Katana, a cheaper 4x2 version of Jimny, introduced in 1989) and Pakistani built Jimny (Potohar) were produced for local market at least until 2006.)
- 1983–present Suzuki Carry ST100/SK410 (Note: Indonesia, Myanmar and Vietnam continued producing Suzuki Carry with F10A engine in the 2000s. After of the discontinuation of Indonesian built ST100 Carry 1.0i in 2009, as of December 2020, Vietnam and Myanmar still producing SK410 Carry with F10A engine.)
- 1985–2000 Maruti Gypsy (India)
- 1985–1986 Holden Scurry (Australia)
- 1986–1990 Suzuki Forsa SA410 (Indonesia)
- 1986–1999 Bedford/GME/Vauxhall Rascal (United Kingdom/Europe)
- 1990–2000 Maruti 1000 (India)
- 1992–1999 Ford Pronto (Taiwan)
- 1999–2006 Suzuki Karimun SL410R (Indonesia)
- 2000–2012 Suzuki Alto RA410 (Pakistan)

The 970 cc F10A engine as well as 870 cc (62 mm x 72 mm) DA/LJ462 and 1051 cc (65.5 mm x 78 mm) DA/LJ465Q versions are available in China and produced by numerous Suzuki's former business partners such as Jilin, Jiefang, Changan, Changhe or Hafei and used in a wide number of small vehicles, mostly based from Suzuki Carry, Suzuki Alto or even Daihatsu Hijet.

=== F10D ===
Suzuki F10D engine
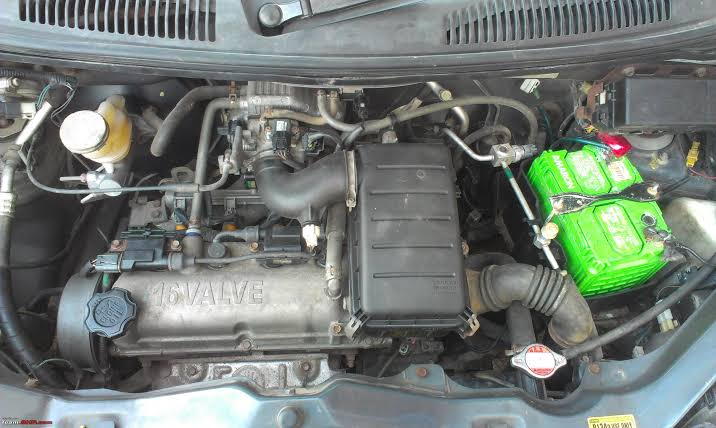
- A F10D engine installed in the Maruti Wagon R.

Overview
- Manufacturer: Maruti Suzuki
- Production: 1999-2010

Layout
- Configuration: Straight-four engine
- Displacement: 1,061 cc (1.1 L; 64.7 cu in)
- Cylinder bore: 68 mm (2.68 in)
- Piston stroke: 72 mm (2.83 in)
- Cylinder block material: Cast iron
- Cylinder head material: Aluminium
- Valvetrain: SOHC 4 valves x cyl.
- Compression ratio: 10.0:1

Combustion
- Fuel system: Multi-port fuel injection
- Fuel type: Gasoline
- Oil system: Wet sump
- Cooling system: Water-cooled

Output
- Power output: 61–64 bhp (45.5–47.7 kW; 61.8–64.9 PS) at 6,000 rpm (EEC)
- Specific power: 57.5 bhp (42.9 kW; 58.3 PS)/litre
- Torque output: 8.7 kg⋅m (85 N⋅m; 63 lb⋅ft) at 3,200 rpm (EEC)

Chronology
- Successor: Suzuki K engine

The Suzuki F10D engine is an inline four-cylinder 1.1 L; 64.7 cu in (1,061 cc) engine that was developed in India by Maruti Suzuki for the domestic market. It was debuted in the Maruti Wagon-R in India in 1999. It was briefly installed in Maruti Alto and it was the engine that the first Maruti Zen Estilo came with. This engine is very similar to the three-cylinder F8D 12-valve engine that was optional on the Maruti 800 at the time. The bore and stroke of F10D is the same as that of the smaller sibling and shares quite a few parts like pistons, rings, connecting rods, and valves. The cast-iron engine block is very similar to that of the older 1.0 L (970 cc) F10A engine that powered the earlier Maruti Gypsy and Maruti 1000. Both F10A and F10D shares the same stroke length; but interchangeability of parts between these two engines is limited, and in some cases unknown, with current findings listed below:

Likeness:

F10A/F10D transmission bellhousing bolt patterns and diameters are the same, and it is possible to swap transmissions between A and D engines.

F10A/F10D both have the same engine mounting points threaded into the side of the engine block.

F10A/F10D have identical oil filter mounting points, the extended oil filter housing from the D can be fitted to the A, or the oil filter spigot from the A fitted to the D

Differences:

F10A intake and exhaust manifolds will not fit the F10D engine (or vice versa) due to difference in the cylinder head bolt patterns and port spacing.

F10A oil dipstick tube is located in the centre of the block on the right-hand side, the F10Ds is front mounted on the right hand side with no port drilling in the centre of the block.

The F10D got a contemporary SOHC alloy cylinder head with 4 valves per cylinder and MPFI. The earlier engines made 62 bhp (46.2 kW) and the late model 32-bit ECU raised it to 64 bhp (47.7 kW). It is very respectable performance for naturally aspirated 1.1 L engine. Maruti re-engineered and optimized the F10D after a few years of its introduction. This "low friction engine" as it was called has a revised engine block, lighter crank and revised oil pump.

The head is much longer than the F10A version, with a three-inch overhang over the gearbox, due to a sensor on the end of the camshaft in place of a traditional distributor, and with a cast aluminium coolant outlet bolted onto the block, consisting of a thermostat, protruding even further.

The FWD F10D sump is different shape and length, the block has differing bolt hole arrangement. The oil pick up pipe and it's mounting points are completely dissimilar on the RWD F10A, and both have different cranks and bearing caps

While the F10A and F10D could bolt to each other's FWD/RWD gearboxes and engine mounts, the F10D occupies more space and would need an updated oil feed system.

Maruti announced in September 2009 that the F10D would not meet upcoming Euro 4 emissions norms and was to be phased out in 2010. It was replaced by the new 3- and 4-cylinder K-series engines.

- Bore/stroke ratio : 0.95
- Unitary capacity : 265.25 cc (16.19 cu in) /cylinder
- bmep : 146 psi (1,006.6 kPa)
- Specific torque : 8.2 kg⋅m (80.4 N⋅m; 59.3 lb⋅ft)/litre
- Main bearings : 5

Applications:

- 1999–2010 Maruti Suzuki Wagon R (India)
- 2001–2010 Suzuki/Maruti Alto
- 2006–2009 Maruti Zen Estilo/Suzuki Karimun Estilo (India/Indonesia)

== See also ==
List of Suzuki engines
