= Autozam AZ-1 =

Car model

Autozam AZ-1 (PG6SA)

Overview
- Manufacturer: Mazda
- Also called: Suzuki Cara (PG6SS)
- Production: AZ-1: October 1992 – October 1994 (4,392); Cara: 1993–1994 (531)
- Designer: Tatsumi Fukunaga (Suzuki RS/3); Toshihiko Hirai (design leader)

Body and chassis
- Class: Sports kei car
- Body style: 2-door coupé
- Layout: RMR layout
- Platform: FRP body on steel chassis
- Doors: Gullwing
- Related: Mazda Carol

Powertrain
- Engine: 657 cc F6A DOHC 12-valve turbo I3
- Transmission: 5-speed manual

Dimensions
- Wheelbase: 2,235 mm (88.0 in)
- Length: 3,295 mm (129.7 in)
- Width: 1,395 mm (54.9 in)
- Height: 1,150 mm (45.3 in)
- Kerb weight: 720 kg (1,587 lb)

The Autozam AZ-1 (known by the framecode PG6SA) is a sports car which was manufactured by Mazda from October 1992 to October 1994 and sold under its Autozam brand. Suzuki provided the engine as well as the inspiration for the design. It is a two-seater kei car with a rear mid-engine, rear-wheel-drive layout and gullwing doors.

Power came from the same Suzuki-sourced 657 cc turbocharged engine used by the Suzuki Alto that produced 64 PS (47 kW) at 6,500 rpm and 85 N⋅m (63 lb⋅ft) at 4,000 rpm. The top speed was electronically governed to be 140 km/h (87 mph).

Suzuki later produced its own badge engineered version named the Suzuki Cara (PG6SS).

== History ==
=== Pre-production ===
==== Suzuki prototypes ====
The proposal for the AZ-1 goes as far back as 1985 when Suzuki created the Suzuki RS/1 as a mid-engine sports car project for volume production. Suzuki's design for the Tokyo Motor Show was a fully functional car with a front/rear weight distribution of 45:55, powered by a modified 1.3-litre G13B engine borrowed from the Cultus GTi.

This was followed up by the Tatsumi Fukunaga-designed RS/3, unveiled for the 1987 Tokyo Motor Show. This version of the car retained many of its design features of the predecessor, but many of its design features were modified to meet Japanese safety regulations as well as for practicality. However, the project was abandoned in favour of the roadster project they had been working on, named later the Cappuccino.

Mazda's design team, led by Toshihiko Hirai, who was also responsible for the MX-5, took over the design project, despite having a limited budget and capacity.

==== Mazda prototypes ====
The redesigned cars, constructed in tube frame with floors and bulkheads constructed from aluminium honeycomb, clad in three different body styles constructed in fibreglass. The cars were constructed around the Kei car regulations of the time (maximum length 126 inches (3,200 mm), maximum engine capacity 550 cc), until this was changed for the following March, hence its model name, AZ-550 Sports.

First introduced at the 1989 Tokyo Motor Show as the AZ-550 with three versions.

The Type A is a red sports car with pop-up headlights, front air vent and gull-wing doors.

The Type B, themed as "High-tuned pure sports", was inspired by the trends in the tuning industry and in current concept car design, featuring greenhouse pyramid roof without a rearward sweep to the C-pillar. It had a racing car inspired interior, unlike Type A, it was aiming for the rough and spartan look and was the only model that had a more conventional forward door hinging. It featured a pair of bulging headlamps and incorporated dual mufflers.

The Type C, has a more distinctive body design as it was inspired by Mazda's Group C racing sports-prototype cars, incorporating its signature colour scheme of blue on white and the number it bore at the 24 hours of Le Mans. Featuring a bigger air intake than the former two, venting to the forward-positioned radiator and exits it along the front rim of the cowl. There are many design cues typical to an endurance racer such as the wing mirror and BBS style brake-cooling wheel discs. Compared to the Type B, this version is far more spartan.

==== Pre-production ====
As the cars were well received by the visiting public and the motoring press, Mazda executives decided on production of the car. Although Type C was the better received of the three, Type A was given the green light by executives as they believed that it would be the one most commercially accepted by the buying public. The Type A would only receive a minor design alteration prior to production, as the pop-up headlights were dropped in favour of fixed units, purely for structural rigidity reasons. The front air vent was the other design alteration made to the car prior to production.

Nonetheless, the car took three years to get into production as the engineering team changed the car's internal skeleton frame to steel to allow for further rigidity. The dashboard design was also changed, to a less futuristic but still sporting look.

Much of the development work was carried out in the United Kingdom, undergoing extensive testing at Lotus' Millbrook Proving Ground, despite the fact that the car was never intended for sale outside Japan.

=== Production ===
Rear view

The car was made available to the buying public in January 1992, with two colour options, Siberia blue and classic red. Both colours came with Venetian gray lower panels. Each car was sold through the Autozam dealer network in Japan.

Unfortunately by the time car came into production, the recession in Japan had just come into force. Selling for 1,498 million ¥ (the equivalent of $12,400), it was slightly less than a Eunos Roadster, but marginally higher than its competitor, the Honda Beat, selling at 1,388 million ¥, and the Suzuki Cappuccino at ¥1,458 million, the AZ-1 was considered to be both too expensive and too cramped for a kei car. The car failed to sell within its target of 800 per month, in the midst of an economic recession. Production of the car ended after the following year, but Mazda had plenty of stock to sell off.

With a total production of 4,392 over a year, plus 531 Suzuki Cara, compared to 28,010 Cappuccinos and 33,600 Beats (both with production reaching into the latter half of the 1990s).

== Alternative versions ==
In a bid to shift unsold stock, Mazda made an effort to produce special versions. First to come was the Type L option, featuring an enhanced audio system including a sub-woofer in the boot. There were no exterior changes made to the car.

=== Mazdaspeed ===
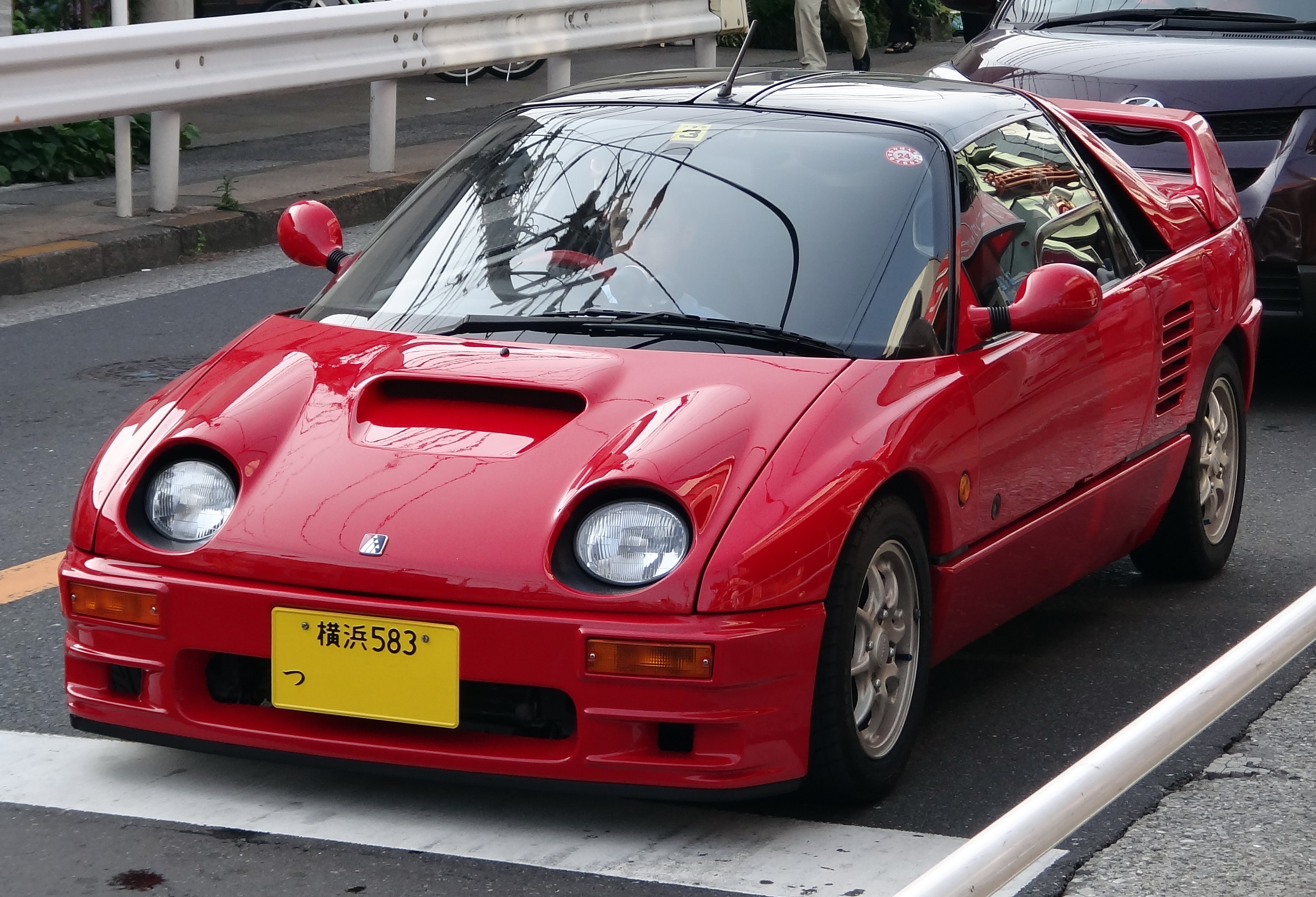
Autozam AZ-1 Mazdaspeed

Mazda also introduced the Mazdaspeed version to showcase the parts that were available for the car, the A-spec, the body kit features an enhanced bonnet, front spoiler and rear wing. Unlike the production version, the car came in an all-red or blue body colour. It also came with a host of options including shock absorbers with sports spring sets, strut bars for the front and rear, mechanical LSD, enhanced air filter and a stainless steel and ceramic muffler. It also came with its own brand of alloy wheels as opposed to the production's steel wheels.

=== M2 1015 ===
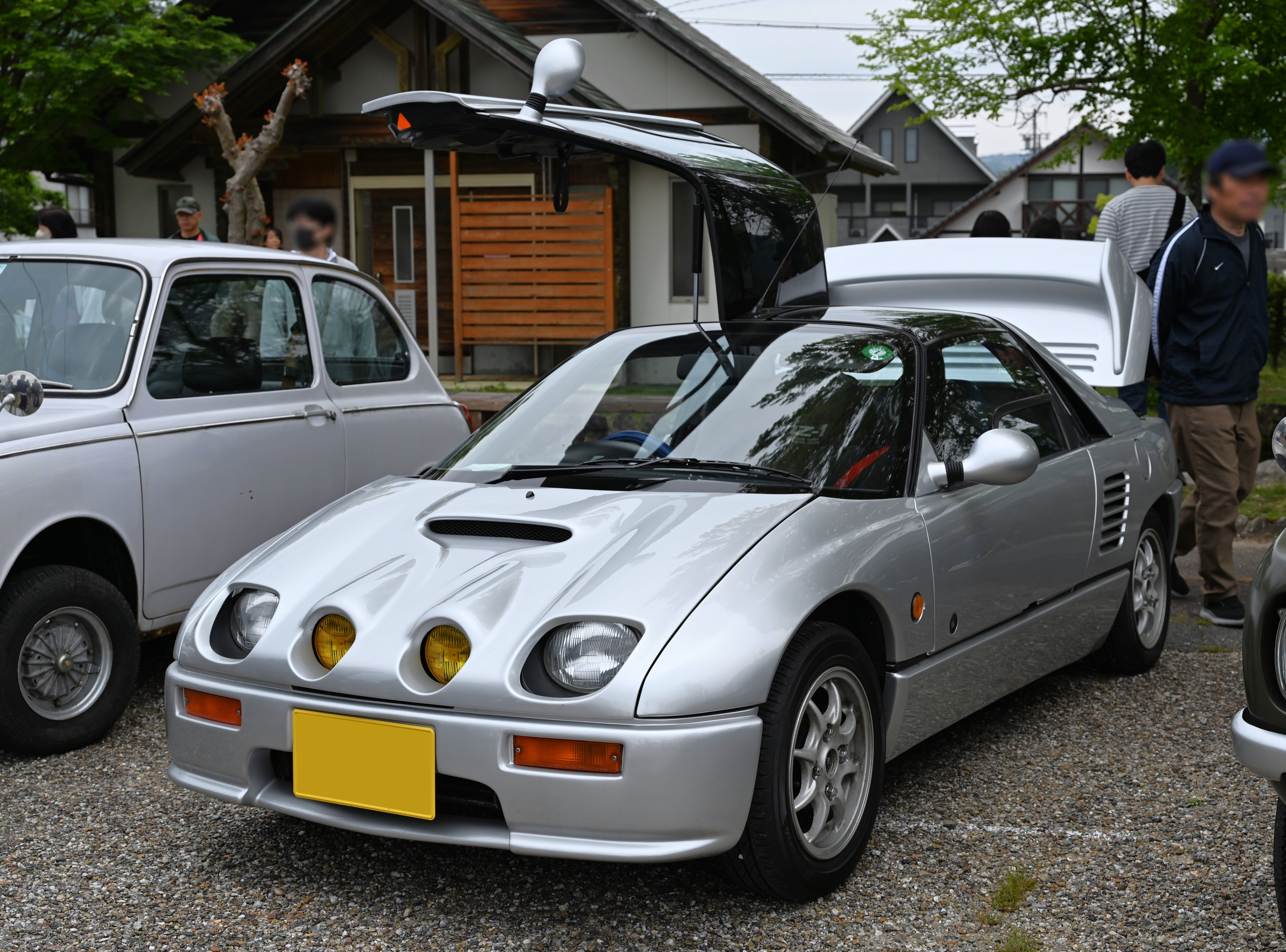
M2 1015

For 1994, There was also the M2 1015 by M2 Incorporated. The most distinguishing part of the car is the front fog lights incorporated into the bonnet, and the all-new front bumper and rear spoiler. The car came in three different colours: white, black and silver. Like the Mazdaspeed version, the car was painted entirely in a single colour.

Originally, only fifty units were to be produced by M2, then sold through Autozam dealers. However, of the fifty units planned for production, only around half were sold. To cover their losses, the rest were parted out and sold as individual parts. A genuine "M2 1015" can be identified by the rear emblem stating the version name.

=== Suzuki Cara ===
See Suzuki Cara in Japanese Wikipedia

The AZ-1 was also sold by Suzuki as the Cara, with only minor detail changes including the addition of fog lamps.

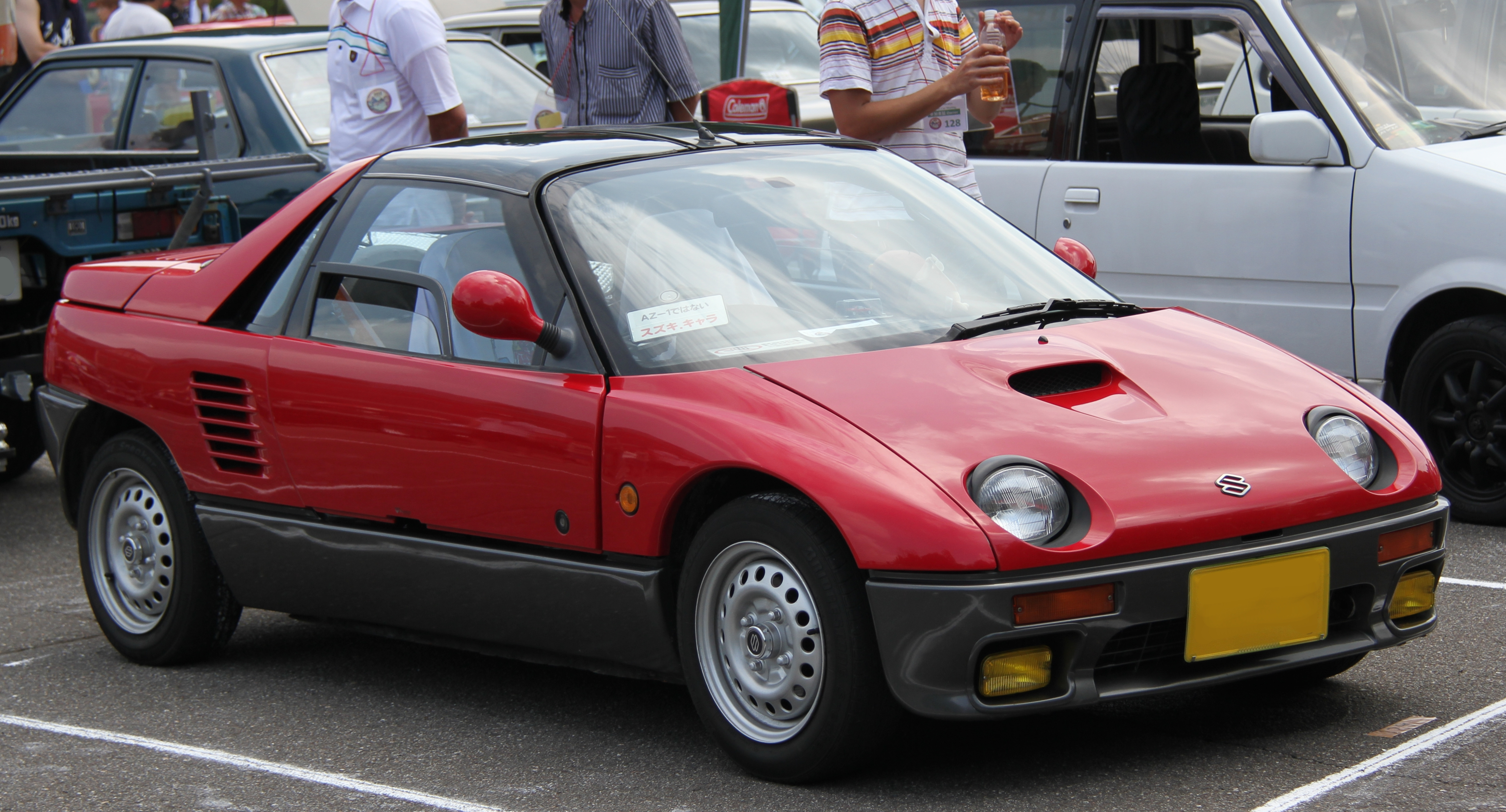
Suzuki Cara (front)

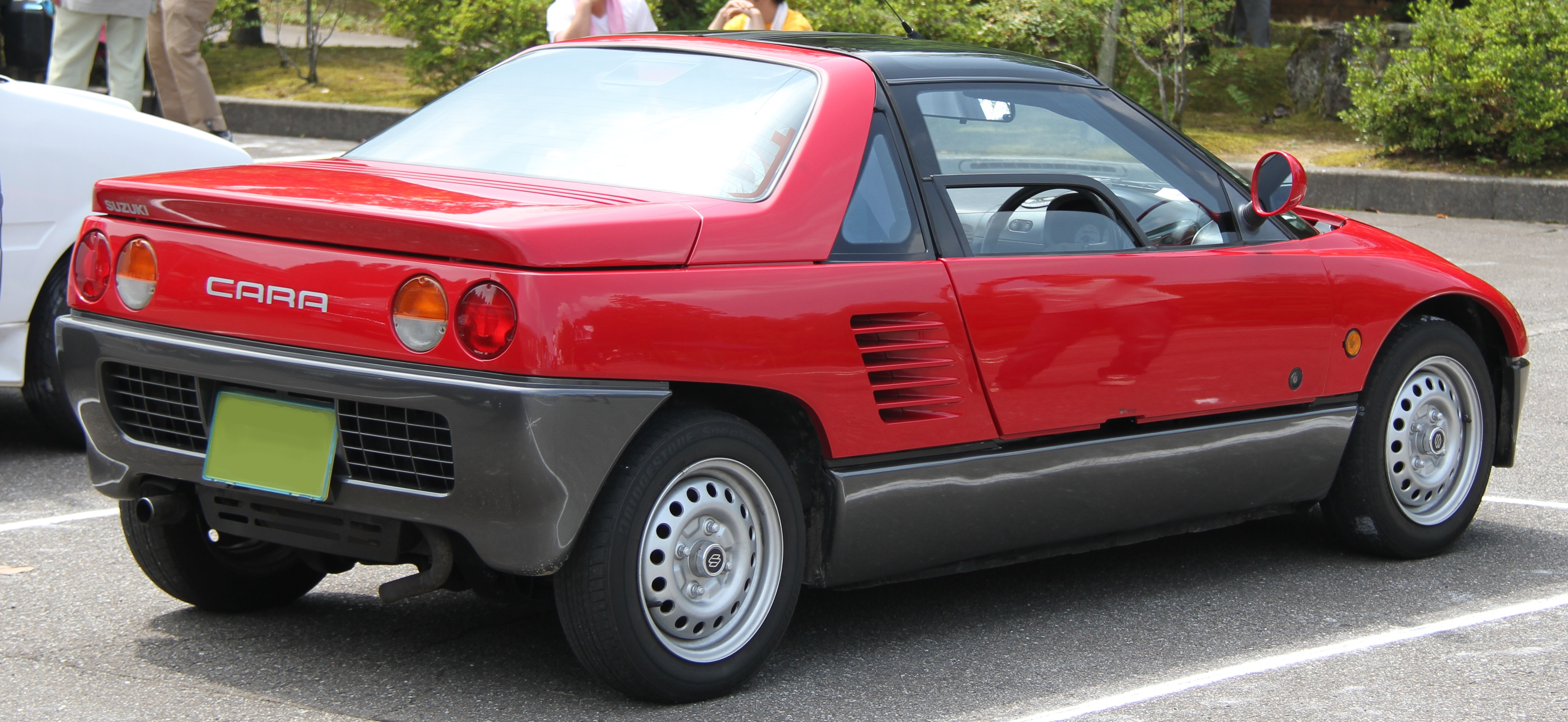
Suzuki Cara (rear)
