= Suzuki Cappuccino =

Lightweight Japanese sports car

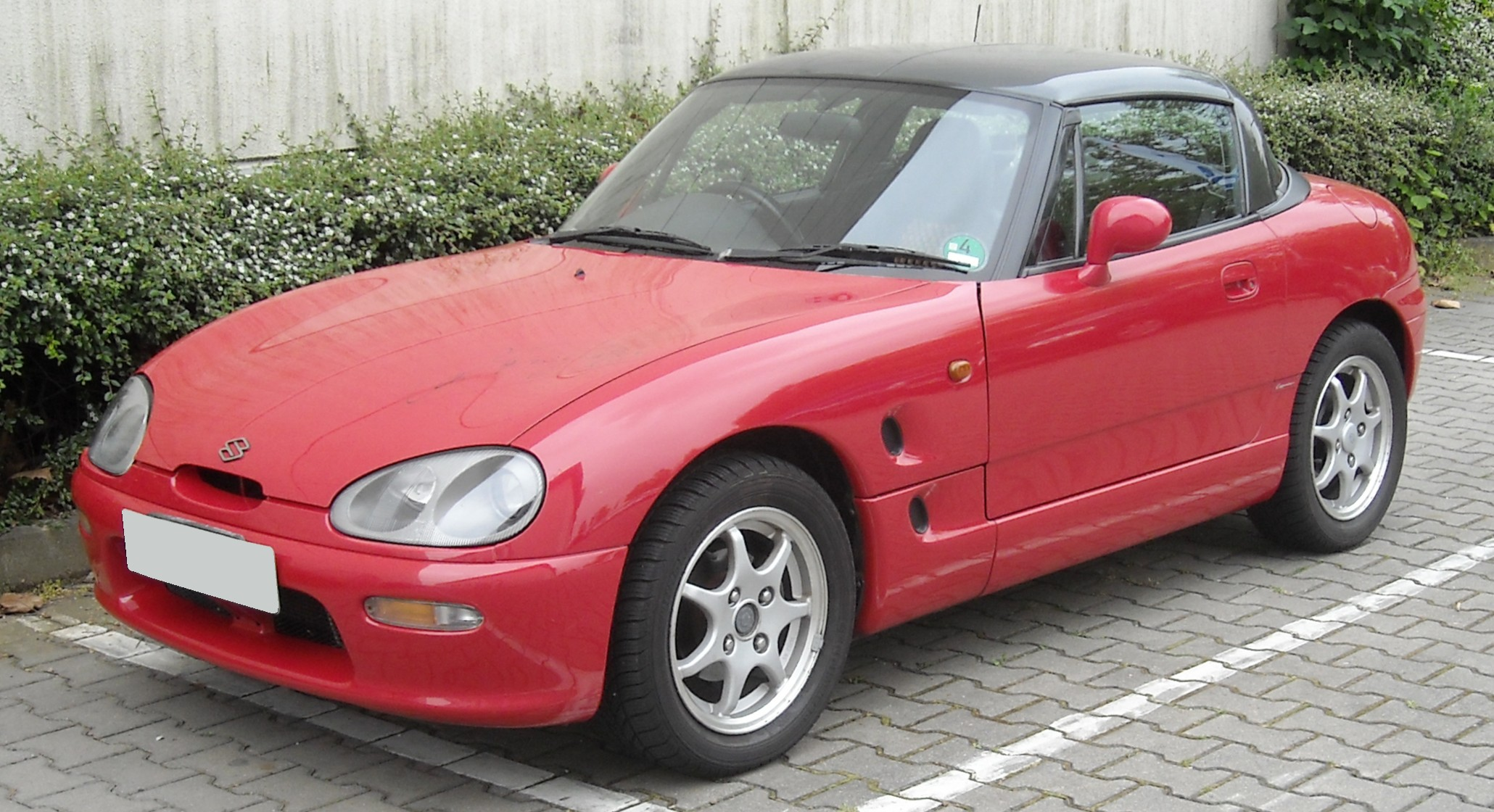

Overview
- Manufacturer: Suzuki
- Production: 1991–1998
- Assembly: Kosai, Shizuoka, Japan

Body and chassis
- Class: Kei car; Sports car
- Body style: 2-door roadster
- Layout: Front mid-engine, rear-wheel-drive

Powertrain
- Engine: 657 cc F6A DOHC turbo I3; 657 cc K6A DOHC turbo I3
- Transmission: 5-speed manual 3-speed automatic

Dimensions
- Wheelbase: 2,060 mm (81.1 in)
- Length: 3,295 mm (129.7 in)
- Width: 1,395 mm (54.9 in)
- Height: 1,185 mm (46.7 in)
- Curb weight: 725 kg (1,598 lb)

The Suzuki Cappuccino (Japanese: スズキ・カプチーノ, Suzuki Kapuchīno) is a sports car produced by the Japanese company Suzuki from 1991 to 1998. It is a two-seater roadster with a detachable hardtop that is designed to meet Japanese kei car regulations.

== Description ==
The vehicle was designed to meet Kei car specifications for lower tax and insurance in Japan. Weighing 725 kg (1,598 lb), the Cappuccino is powered by a turbocharged, three-cylinder, 657 cc DOHC engine (just under the 660 cc maximum displacement allowed for a Kei car). Its dimensions also conformed to Kei car regulations on length and width, being 3,295 mm (129.7 in) long and 1,395 mm (54.9 in) wide.

Front-rear weight distribution is claimed to be 50/50% when both seats are occupied. Layout is front mid-engined and rear-wheel drive. The hood, roof, roll bar and lower front guard panels are aluminium.

Three removable roof panels mean that the car can be used as a closed coupé; T-top; targa; or, on retraction of the rear window and roll bar, a full convertible. Roof panels stow in the trunk (taking almost all the luggage space), and the rear window/rollcage assembly retracts into the body behind the seats. Unlike many convertibles of the time, the rear window is glass and wraparound, with demisting elements. An unusual option was the Winter package (identified by a "W" suffix in the model code); this included a heavy duty battery and special "snow shovelling" windshield wipers.

It was originally equipped with the F6A engine: later models were fitted with a K6A engine which was lighter and had chain-driven, rather than belt-driven camshafts and more torque. Both are DOHC 12-valve, inline three-cylinder engines that were turbocharged and intercooled. Power output was a claimed 64 PS (47 kW; 63 hp) at 6500 rpm so as to not exceed the maximum power allowed for Kei cars.

The initial Cappuccino featured all-wheel disc brakes and rear-wheel drive. Later versions in Japan had an early production iteration of speed-sensing electric power-assisted steering and aluminium double wishbone suspension. Production began in 1991 and ceased in 1998. The Cappuccino's closest competitor of the time were the Autozam AZ-1, Honda Beat and the Daihatsu Leeza Spyder (the AZ-1, Beat, and Cappuccino were referred to as the Sporty Kei car ABC).

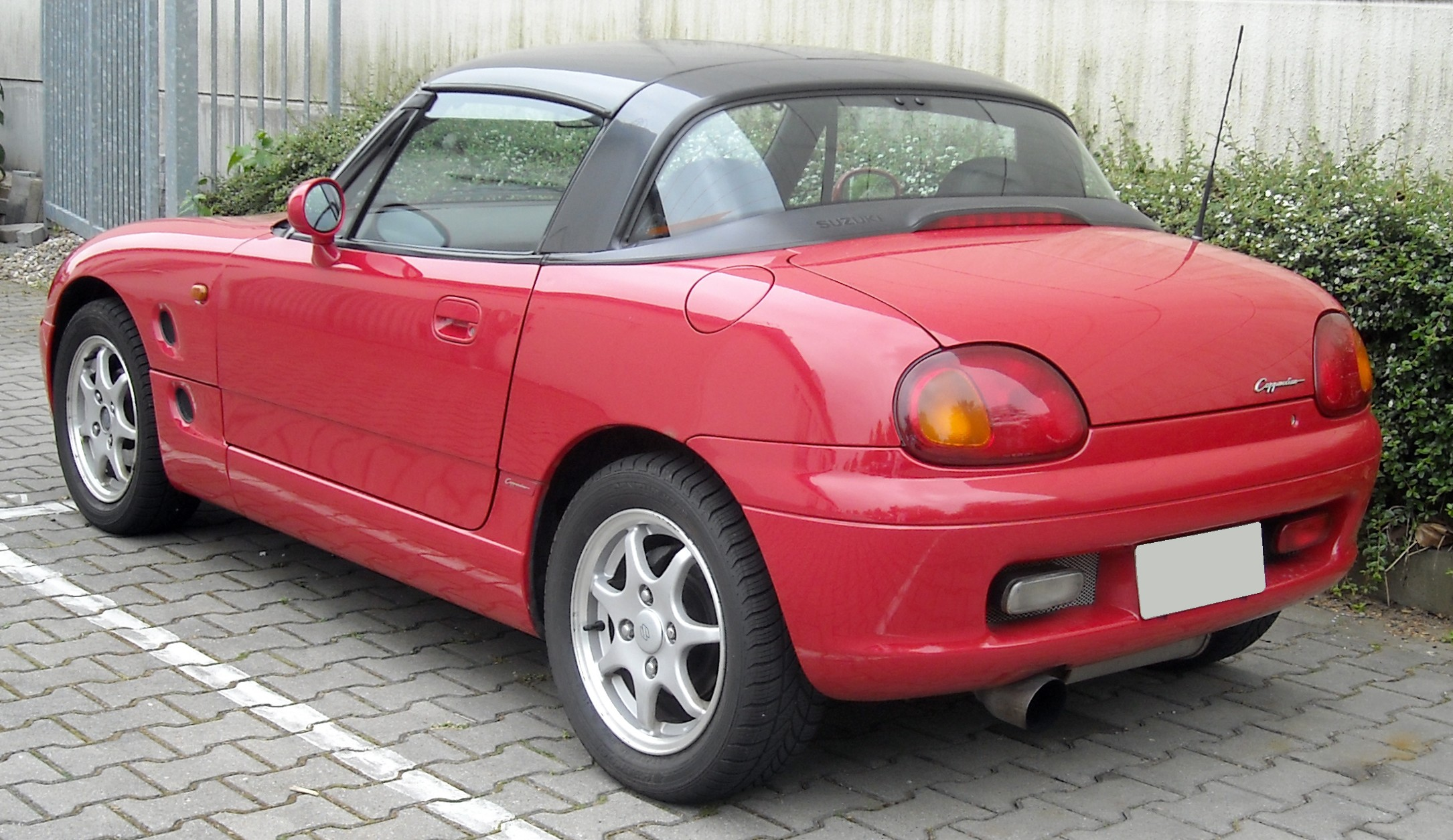
Rear view

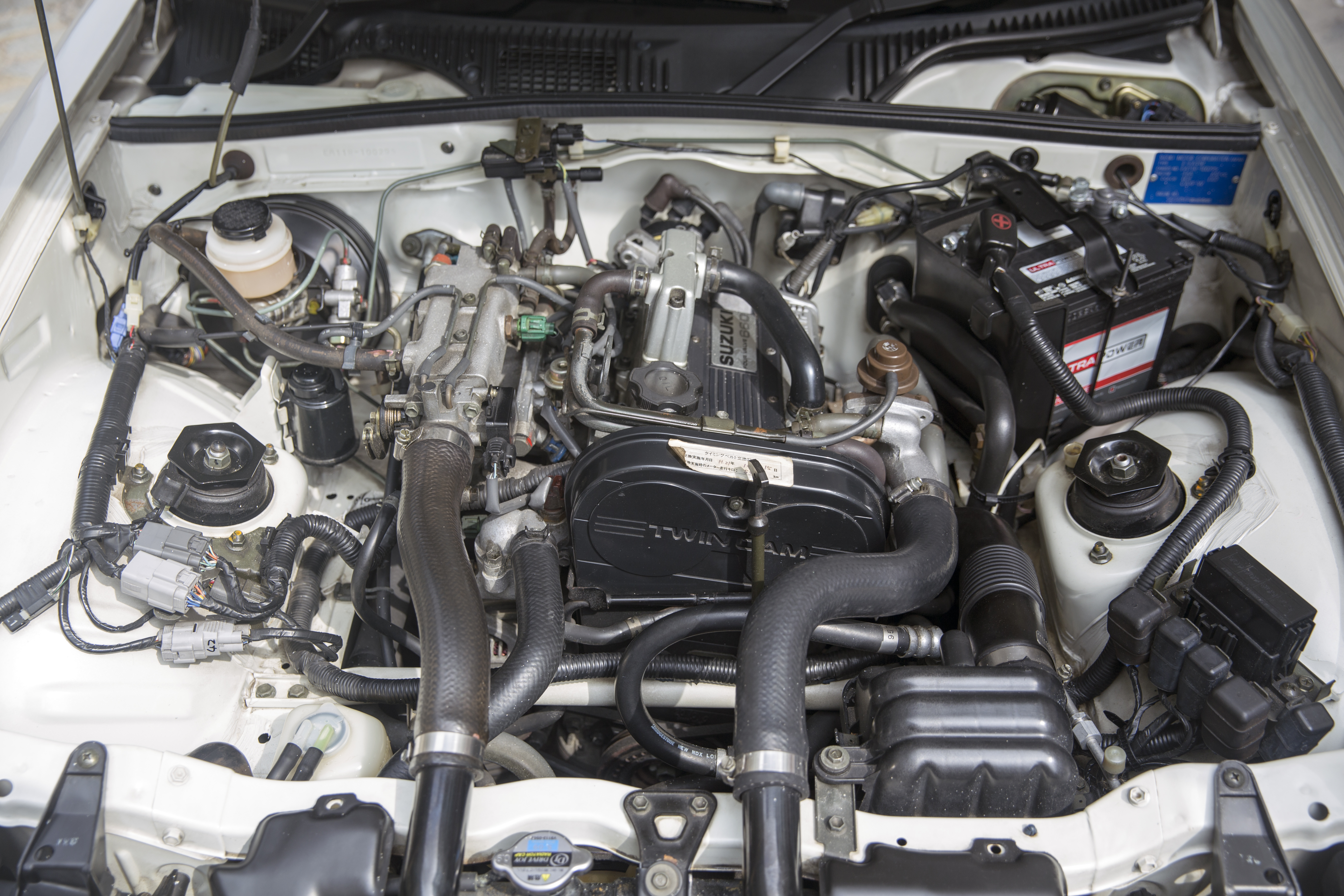
The F6A engine in an EA11R Cappuccino

== History ==
The dream of recreating a sporting image for Suzuki began in 1987 and within two years the "project car" was shown for the first time at the Tokyo Motor Show. Suzuki intentionally designed the Cappuccino just for the Japanese market, meeting the tax needs of the Kei-class: body length less than 3.3 m (10.8 ft), body width not exceeding 1.4 m (4.6 ft) and engine size less than 0.66 L. There was originally no intention to export the Cappuccino. Production of the Cappuccino started in October 1991 at the Kosai Plant.

The car had the internal designation SX306, and the model identification (incorporated in the VIN) EA11R. The sales launch of the Cappuccino was November 1991 in Japan, with the advertising theme: "fulfilling one's dream of owning a stylish and very affordable 2 seater sportscar". The first two years (1991–92) saw 15,113 cars produced with 13,318 (or 88% of production) sold in Japan. In addition to the European export model discussed below, the Cappuccino was regularly available in Hong Kong, and there was also a rare "General Export" market model.

=== UK/EU version ===
In 1991 Suzuki GB opened discussions with Suzuki Motor Corporation about launching the car in the United Kingdom and meeting the needs of British National Type Approval. After 18 months of negotiation and technical co-operation between SMC and SGB, the Suzuki Cappuccino type was approved and homologated, with 23 adaptations required for the vehicle to conform to British NTA. The work was performed at the Kosai Plant and at the Suzuki Import Centre.

In October 1992, the Cappuccino's first public viewing outside Japan occurred at the British International Motor Show, where it won two IBCAM Design awards: Best Sportscar Under £20,000 and Best Car of the Show. In October 1993, the Cappuccino was officially launched in the UK, priced at £11,995. Due to the car's initial success in Japan, and the tight import quota of Japanese products to the UK, the original allocation of 1,500 cars was cut to 1,182. Such limited quantities dictated a streamlined colour choice: red and silver in the ratio 4:1. Between 1993 and 1995, a total of 1,110 cars were registered in the UK, with the balance sold to other Suzuki distributors across Europe: Germany, France, the Netherlands, and Sweden.

=== Revised Cappuccino (EA21R) ===
In 1995 tougher emission controls were set by the European Commission, which led to the unsold cars being registered by 30 September 1995; any unregistered after that date would have had to be re-homologated. Discussions took place between SMC and Suzuki distributors in Europe to assess and "value" the necessary changes for the Cappuccino to meet these new emission levels. The corporate decision was made not to proceed with a revised European version due to the vast expense involved and lack of economy of scale due to the limited production run.

The later specification (EA21R), introduced in 1995, had new, lighter engine with chain-driven camshafts, slightly increased torque, lighter wheels and an optional 3-speed automatic transmission with power steering. Both EA11R and EA21R (MT only) versions had optional "high specification" BA variants, which came with an airbag for the driver, ABS on all four wheels, a limited-slip differential and (in some cases) power-operated door mirrors. There were three limited editions of the EA11R, offering variations of colour and trim; the later two had power steering.
