= The Wiz (disambiguation) =

The Wiz is a Broadway musical based on The Wonderful Wizard of Oz.

The Wiz may also refer to:

- The Wiz (film), the 1978 film adaptation of the Broadway musical
  - The Wiz (soundtrack), the soundtrack to the film
- The Wiz Live! An NBC 2015 live TV production of a new adaptation of the Broadway musical
- The Wiz (store), former chain of American electronics stores
- The Wiz, nickname of Jeff Farmer (footballer) (born 1977), Australian rules footballer
- The Wiz, nickname of Davey Whitney (1930–2015), American college basketball head coach
- The Wiz, a system by Da Vinci Systems, a digital cinema company
- Wiz (video game), a 1985 video game also released as The Wiz

== See also ==
- Wiz (disambiguation)
- WHIZ (disambiguation) (for WHIZ, Whiz and Whizz)
- WIZF, a Cincinnati radio station known as The Wiz
- Kansas City Wiz, now Sporting Kansas City
