= Wiz =

Wiz may refer to:

== Arts and entertainment ==
- Wizard (MUD), or wiz, a developer or administrator of Multi-User Dungeon game
- "Wiz" Zumwalt, the hero of a series of novels by Rick Cook
- Wiz (KonoSuba), a character in the light novel series KonoSuba
- Wiz, a character in the Wiz 'n' Liz video game
- Wiz, a character in the Eternally Confused and Eager for Love Netflix series
- Wiz, a character in the D.N.Angel manga series
- Wiz (video game), a 1985 arcade game

== People ==
- W.I.Z., Andrew Whiston (born 1964), an English director of films and music videos
- Marko Wiz, a 17th century politician in Slovenia
- Wiz, stage name of Darren Brown (musician) (1962–2006)
- Wiz, American rapper, member of Bravehearts
- Wiz Khalifa, Cameron Jibril Thomaz (born 1987), American rapper
- Jarkko Oikarinen, creator of IRC, known online as WiZ

== Technology ==
- WiZ, a compression program for Windows
- GP2X Wiz, an open-source handheld video game console

== Companies and organizations ==
- Wiz, Inc., an Israeli-American cybersecurity company part of Google Cloud
- Washington Wizards, a professional American basketball team
- Akihiro Yokoi of WiZ, co-creator of Tamagotchi

== See also ==
- The Wiz (disambiguation)
- Wizard (disambiguation)
- WHIZ (disambiguation) (for WHIZ, Whiz and Whizz)
- Wizz (disambiguation)
- WJZ (disambiguation)
- WZ (disambiguation)
- Kansas City Wiz, now Sporting Kansas City
