= Whiz Kids =

Whiz Kids, or variants, may refer to:

- Whiz kid, a child prodigy, a child who produces meaningful output in some domain to the level of an adult expert performer

== Film, television and games ==
- Wiz Kid (Taki Matsuya), a character in Marvel Comics
- Whiz Kid, a Marvel Comics character and member of the Liberteens
- Whiz Kids (TV series), American science fiction adventure television series 1983
- Wizkid: The Story of Wizball II, a 1992 video game developed by Sensible Software
- Whiz Kid (Entourage), an episode of the TV series Entourage

== Music ==
- Wizkid, Ayodeji Ibrahim Balogun (born 1990), a Nigerian singer and songwriter
- The Whizz Kids, a New Zealand pop/rock band
- Whiz Kids (album), by Gary Burton, 1986

== Sports ==
- Whiz Kids (baseball), the 1950 Philadelphia Phillies baseball team
- Whiz Kids, the 1942–43 Illinois Fighting Illini men's basketball team

== Other ==
- WizKids, collectible miniatures games developer and publisher
- Whiz Kids (Ford), a group of post-World War II Ford Motor Company executives
- Whiz Kids (Department of Defense), a group of experts for RAND Corporation
- WhizzKids United a South African youth HIV / AIDS prevention, care, treatment and support programme
- Whizzkid's Guide, books by magician Peter Eldin
- Suzuki Cervo, a motor vehicle known in England by the nickname "Whizzkid"

== See also ==
- WHIZ (disambiguation)
