= Maruti Suzuki Zen =

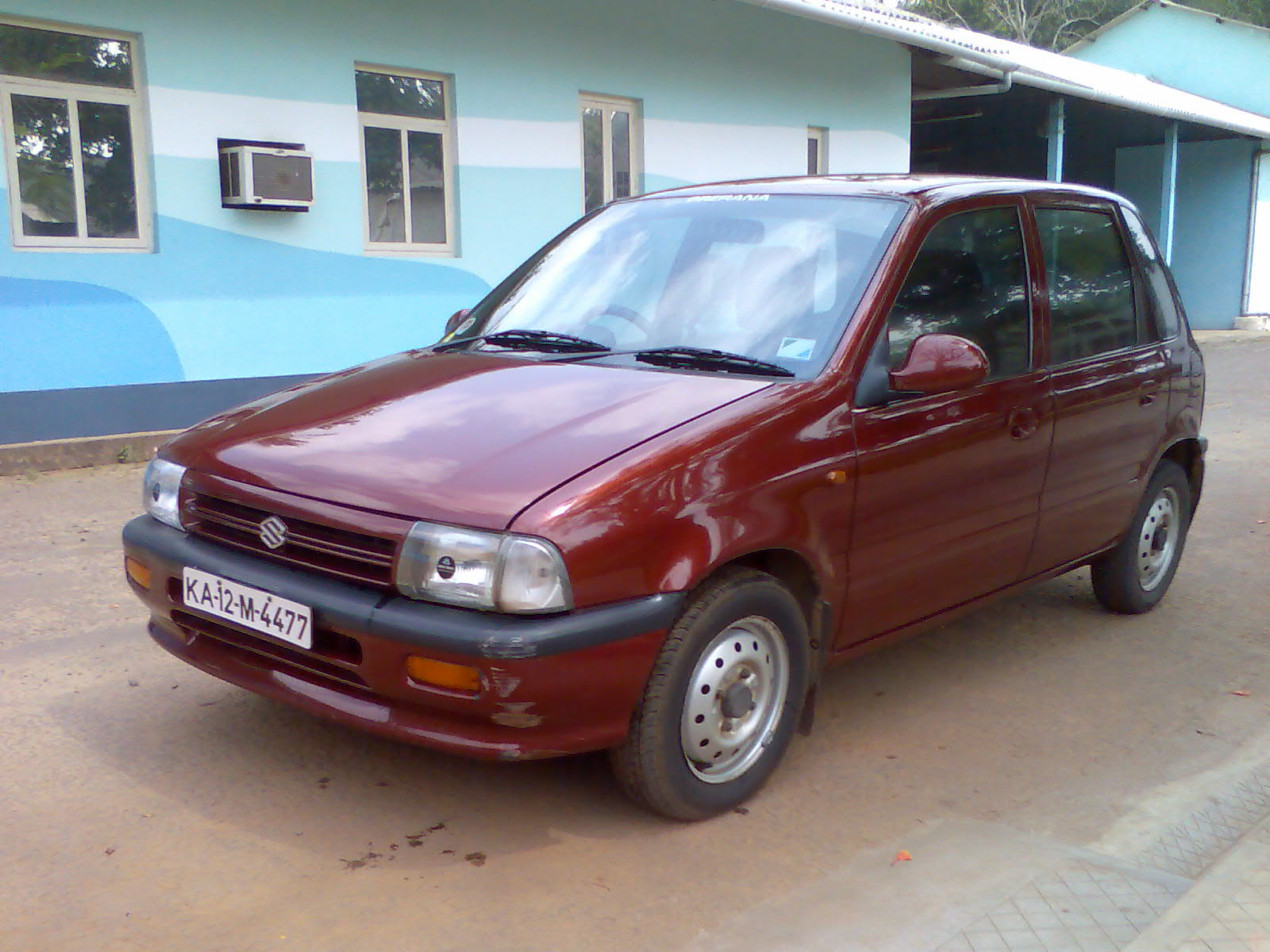

Overview
- Production: 1993–2006
- Assembly: Gurgaon, Haryana, India

Body and chassis
- Class: City car (A)
- Body style: 3-/5-door hatchback
- Layout: Front-engine, front-wheel-drive
- Related: Suzuki Cervo (JP)

Powertrain
- Engine: 993 cc G10B 8-valve Carb (1993-2003) I4; 993 cc G10BB 16 valve MPFI (2000-2006) I4; 1527 cc TUD5 diesel I4
- Transmission: 5-speed manual 3-speed automatic

Dimensions
- Wheelbase: 2,335 mm (91.9 in)
- Length: 3,495–3,535 mm (137.6–139.2 in)
- Width: 1,495 mm (58.9 in)
- Height: 1,405 mm (55.3 in)

Chronology
- Successor: Maruti Suzuki Estilo/Zen Estilo

The Maruti Suzuki Zen is a 5-door hatchback produced and sold in India by Suzuki's Indian subsidiary Maruti Suzuki from 1993 until 2006, a widened version of the Suzuki Cervo Mode. The word "ZEN" is an acronym standing for Zero Engine Noise. It also stands for the Japanese word "Zen" which means 'Complete'. The Indian-built Zen was also exported to other countries as the Suzuki Alto.

== First generation ==
Based on the Suzuki Cervo, the first generation Maruti Suzuki Zen was introduced on 21 May 1993 (MH410). While it looks very similar to the Cervo Mode, it has a lot of unique sheetmetal as it is twenty centimeters longer and ten wider. In Europe and many other export markets, the car sold as the Suzuki Alto. Zen used an all aluminium engine Suzuki G10B engine which produced 50 hp (37 kW) of power at around 6500 rpm. Also the Zen which was sold as Suzuki Alto 1.0 in Europe came with a G10B 8-valve engine which produces 54 hp (40 kW) at 6500 rpm and 74 N⋅m (55 lb⋅ft) of torque at 4500 rpm.

There was a minor facelift in 1997 with body coloured bumpers. In 1999, Zen Classic with retro looking front and rear was launched, but was soon discontinued due to lack of demand.

In 2000, Maruti introduced a 16 valve MPFI engine with 4 valves per cylinder. Power output went up by ten horsepower to 60 hp (44 kW). Its cost (of the Zen LX model) was around Rs 3,40,000 in India. A diesel version of Zen was launched in 1998 with the Peugeot's TUD5 (PSA TU engine) engine. This model did not sell well and was discontinued. In 2004 Zen underwent a facelift with new body which was called Zen Tiger.

The Zen underwent a facelift in 2003. A three-door version of the Zen in VXi segment was launched, priced at 5.0 Lakh (ex-showroom, New Delhi). It was only available in Black (Zen Carbon) 300 nos or Silver (Zen Steel) 300 nos, cars. In 2006 the second generation (Zen Tiger) was discontinued.

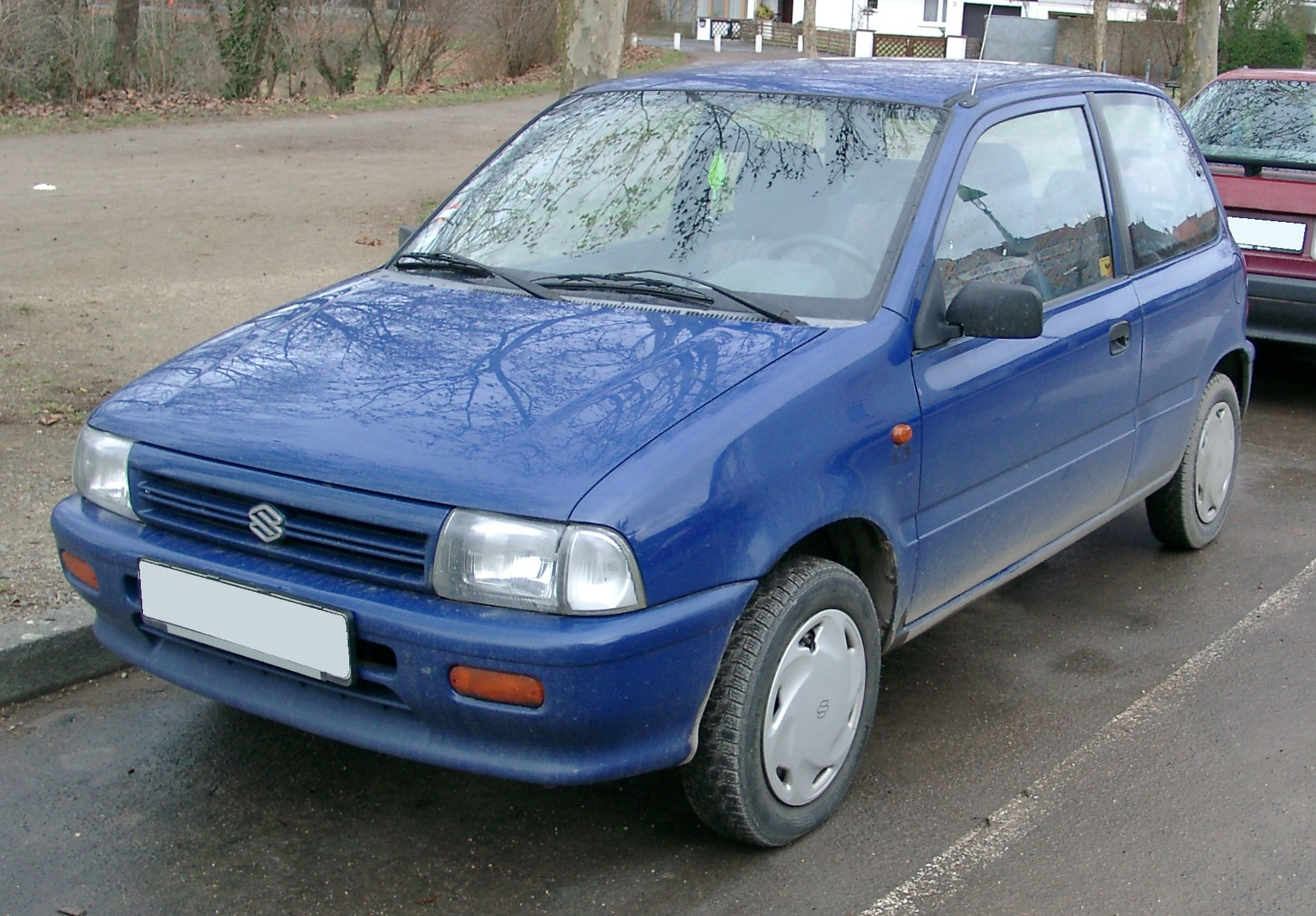
European export version with "Suzuki Alto" badging

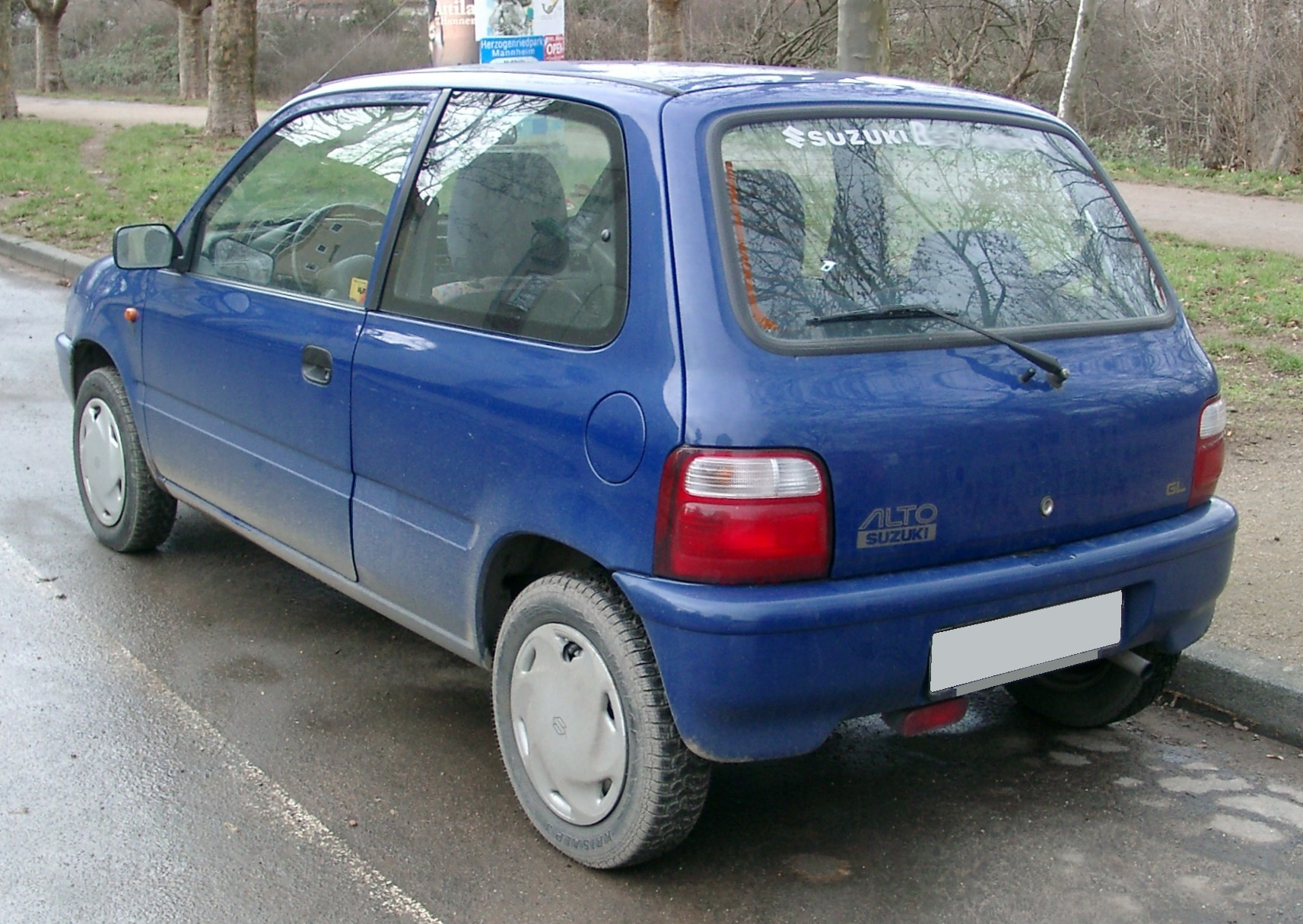
European export version with "Suzuki Alto" badging

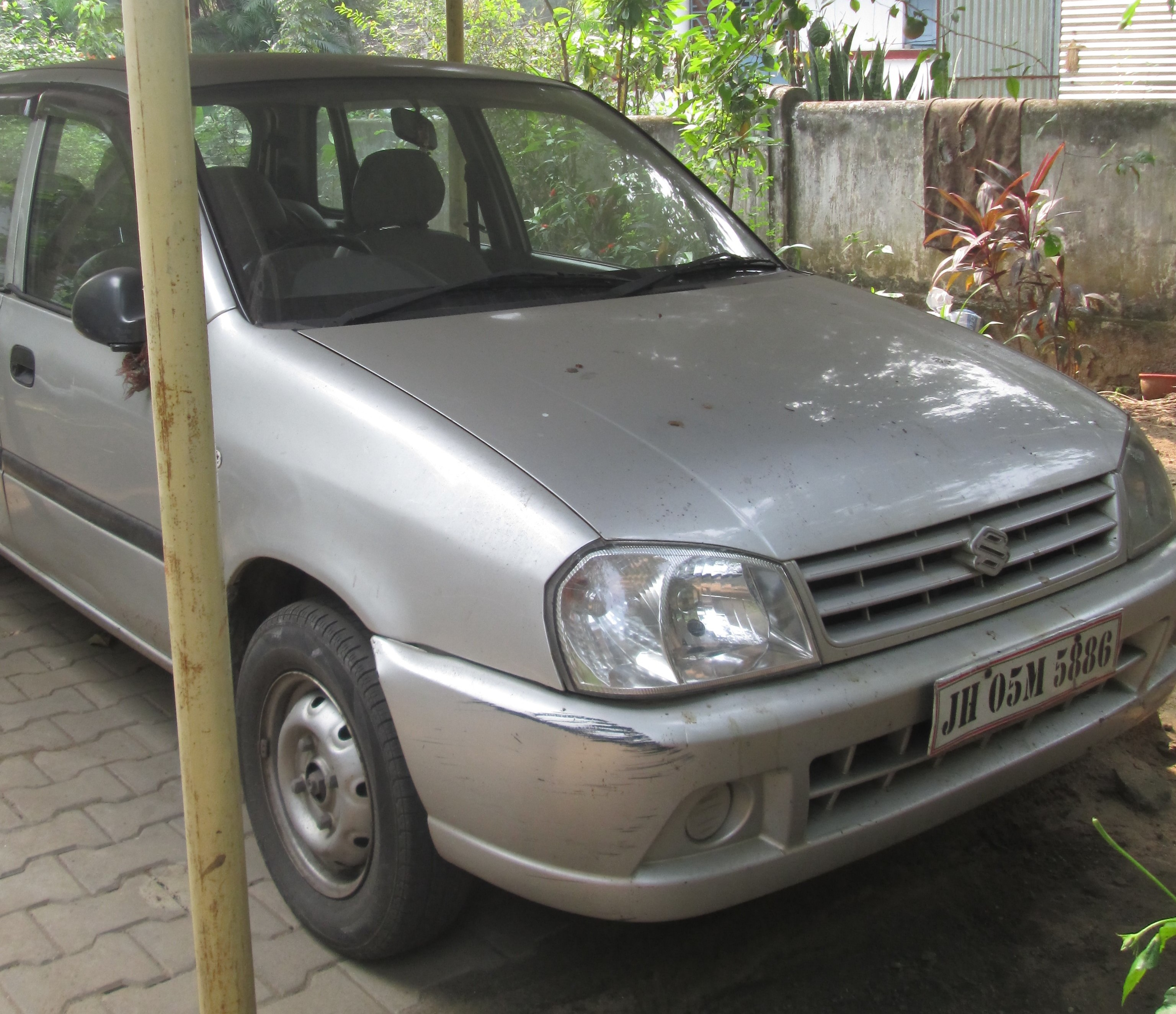
Maruti Suzuki Zen (2003 facelift)

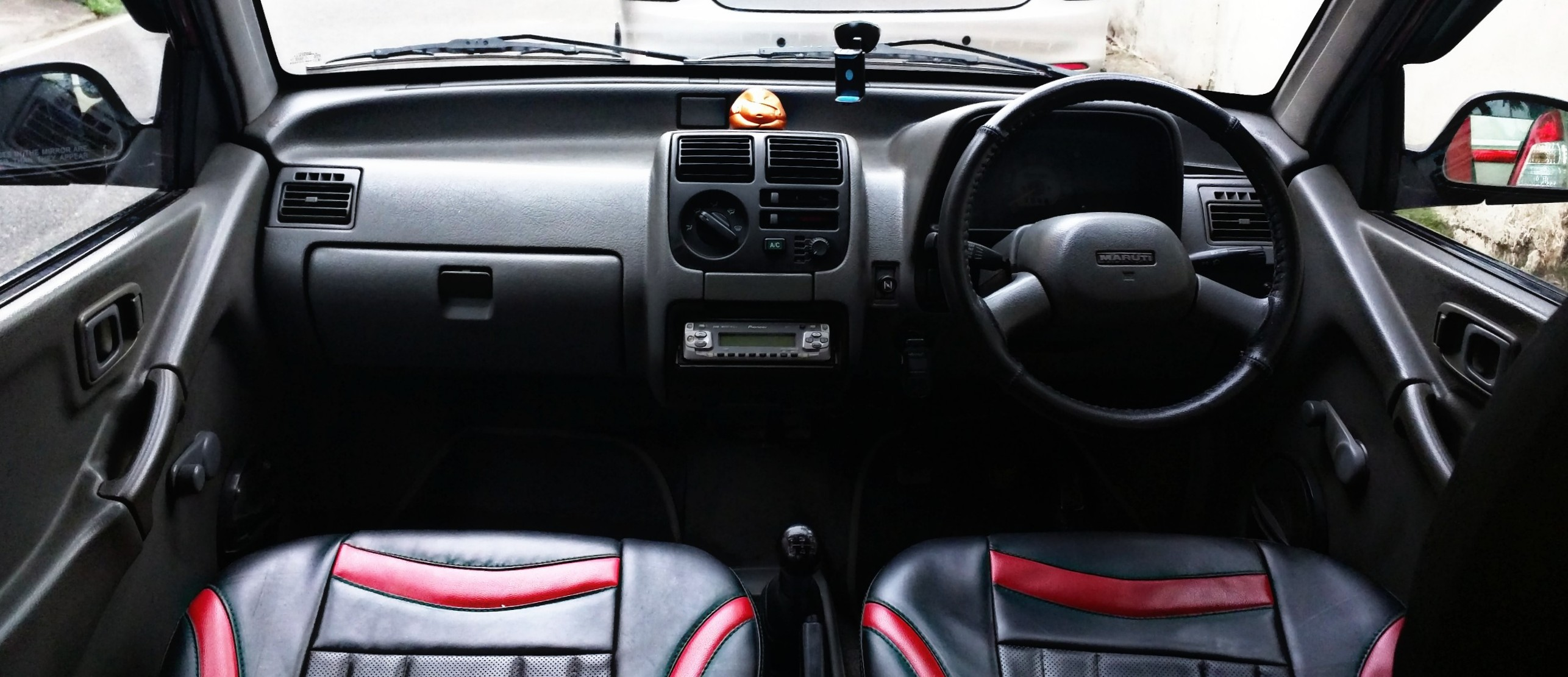
Maruti Suzuki Zen interior

== Second generation ==
The second generation Maruti Suzuki Zen, called the Zen Estilo was introduced in December 2006 as a part of Maruti Suzuki's Indian market strategy to launch a new car annually for the next five years. The Zen Estilo had the same engine and chassis as the Maruti Wagon R; both being based on the Suzuki MR Wagon (Nissan Moco). The pricing was also nearly the same as the Wagon R. The Maruti Suzuki Alto (model prior to Alto K10), Wagon R (till Aug 2010) and the new Zen Estilo all shared the same chassis. In 2009, along with a minor facelift, Maruti Suzuki dropped the Zen branding from the name.

== Reception ==
The Zen was a very successful model for Maruti Suzuki both in India and abroad. It was called India's first world car and was exported to Europe as early as 1994. Besides being exported to Europe from 1994 to 2004, it has also been exported to several other countries. The Zen quickly became a hit with the Indian Racing Scene with highly modified versions of the 993 cc G10B engine topping 100+ Bhp.

The Zen was the first fun to drive hatchback in the Indian market. It was a driver oriented car with low seating and go kart like handling. The car was very reliable and it is possible to find many good examples of Zen still in use. The Zen still commands a relatively high resale value on the used car market.

== Technical specifications ==
Trim levels at launch badged as MH410 later as LX, LXi, VXi and D, Di The Maruti Suzuki Zen has a four-cylinder in-line all aluminium engine mounted transverse and using Carburetor/MPFI Carburetor, Valvetrain is 2 Valves/Cylinder SOHC with displacement of 993 cc. Maximum power is 50 hp (37 kW) at 6500 rpm and maximum torque 7.2 kgm at 4500 rpm. Compression Ratio 8:8:1 MPFI valvetrain is 4 valves/cyl, SOHC with a displacement of 993 cc. Maximum power is 60 hp (44 kW) at 6000 rpm and maximum torque is 78.5 N⋅m (58 lb⋅ft) at 4500 rpm. It has a 5 speed manual transmission.

- Bore x Stroke: 72.0 mm (2.8 in) x 61.0 mm (2.4 in)
  Comp Ratio: 9.4 (+/- 0.2):1
  Drivetrain
- Front brakes: 182 mm (7.2 in) disc
  Rear: 180 mm (7.1 in) drum
  Type: Hydraulic, vacuum assisted
  Wheels F/R: 4Jx13,4.5Jx13 (carbon/steel) and 4Jx12”
  Tyres: 145/70/R13 (Earlier Petrol and Diesel variant) and 145/80/R12 (Petrol variant)
  In Zen 155/65/13, Measurements are best to upsize tyres in petrol and diesel variant too (not touches the body of car from top while there is load in car and sides while turning the steering and there is no need to make changes in suspension system) and not effects the mileage
- Steering: Rack and pinion, First EPS from Maruti appeared in Zen.Electric Power assist
  Turning circle dial: 3.9 m (13 ft)
  Turns lock-to-lock: 9.8
  Suspension:
  Front: Independent, MacPherson strut, coil springs
  Rear: 3 link rigid axle with isolated trailing arm, coil spring and gas filled shock absorbers

General data
Kerb weight: 765 kg (1,687 lb)
Wheelbase: 2,335 mm (91.9 in)
Track (F/R) 1335/1305 mm
L/W/H: 3465/1495/1405 mm
Ground clearance: 165 mm (6.5 in)
Accommodation
Seating capacity: 5
Head Room, F/R 952/930 mm
Leg room, F max/min 1170/990 mm
Leg room, R max/min 750/610 mm
Knee room, F max/min 750/610 mm
Knee room, R max/min 840/650 mm
Shoulder space 1,270 mm (50.0 in)

== See also ==
- Maruti Suzuki Zen Estilo
