= WHIZ =

WHIZ, Whiz or Whizz may refer to:

== Arts, entertainment and media ==
- WHIZ (AM), an American radio station
- WHIZ-FM, an American radio station
- WHIZ-TV, an American TV station
- Whiz Comics, a comic book anthology series 1940–1952 known for Captain Marvel
  - WHIZ (comics), a fictional radio station in Captain Marvel stories
- The Whiz, an Amalgam Comics character
- Billy Whizz, a fictional character in The Beano
- Whizz (video game)

== Other uses ==
- Whiz, a slang term for urination
- a slang term for genius
- Cheez Whiz, a processed cheese sauce
- Whiz, a candy bar sold by the Paul F. Beich Company

== See also ==
- Whiz Kids (disambiguation)
- Wiz (disambiguation)
- Wizz (disambiguation)
- Viz (disambiguation)
- Gee Whiz (disambiguation)
