= Wizz =

Wizz may refer to:

- Wizz Air, a Hungarian low-cost airline
  - Wizz Air Abu Dhabi, a subsidiary
  - Wizz Air UK, a subsidiary
  - Wizz Air Malta, a subsidiary
  - Wizz Air Ukraine, a former subsidiary
  - Wizz Air Bulgaria, a former subsidiary
- WIZZ, an American radio station in Massachusetts

== See also ==
- Wizz Jones, a British musician
- Wizz Fizz, an Australian sherbert brand
- WHIZ (disambiguation)
- Wiz (disambiguation)
- Wizzard
