= Suzuki Mighty Boy =

Mighty Boy (SS40T)
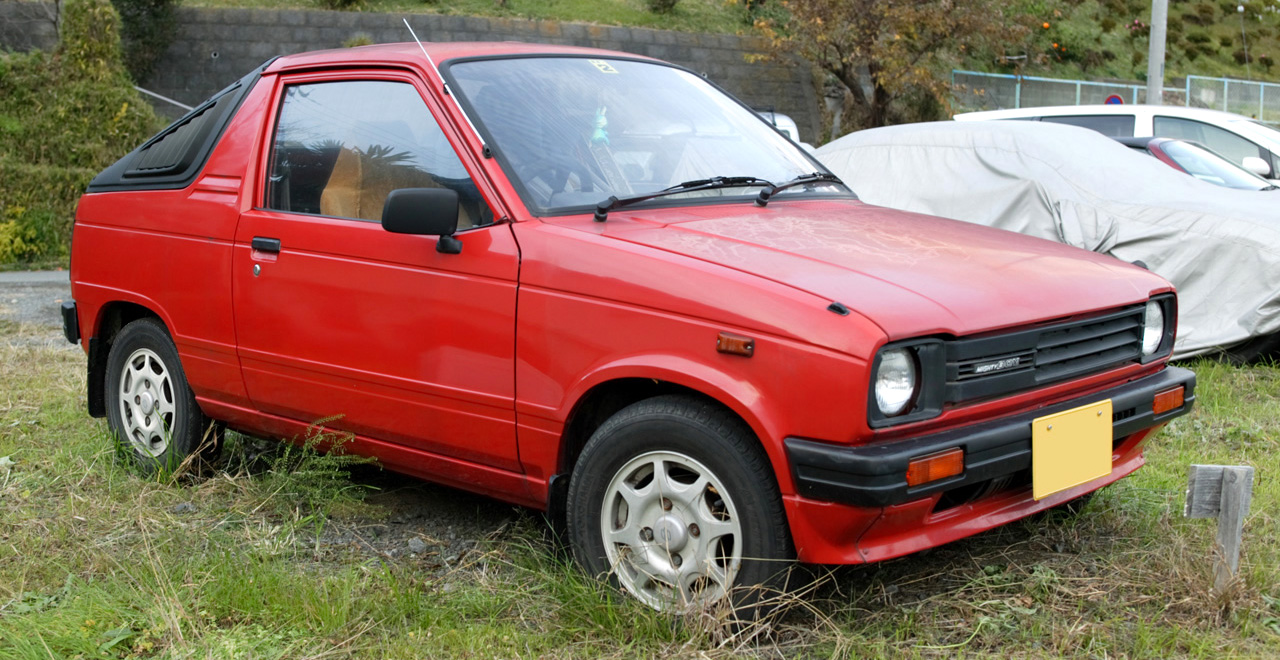
- Pre-facelift Mighty Boy

Overview
- Production: February 1983 – January 1988
- Assembly: Kosai Assembly Plant, Hamana-gun, Shizuoka, Japan

Body and chassis
- Body style: 2-seater, 2 door coupé utility
- Layout: FF, transversely mounted

Powertrain
- Engine: 543 cc Suzuki F5A I3
- Transmission: 4-speed manual 5-speed manual 2-speed automatic

Dimensions
- Wheelbase: 2,150 mm (84.6 in)
- Length: 3,195 mm (125.8 in)
- Width: 1,395 mm (54.9 in)
- Height: 1,290 mm (50.8 in)
- Curb weight: 530–550 kg (1,168–1,213 lb)

The Suzuki Mighty Boy is an automobile produced by Japanese automaker Suzuki from 1983 to 1988. It was the only three-box pickup truck (or coupé utility) ever sold in the 550 cc era of the kei car class; most other kei trucks use a cab-over design. It was classified as a commercial vehicle in Japan and Australia so as to benefit from lower taxes for such vehicles, but its utility was restricted by its unconventional design.

While the Mighty Boy was not a runaway success and was never replaced in the Suzuki lineup, the car still has a dedicated following in Japan.

== History ==
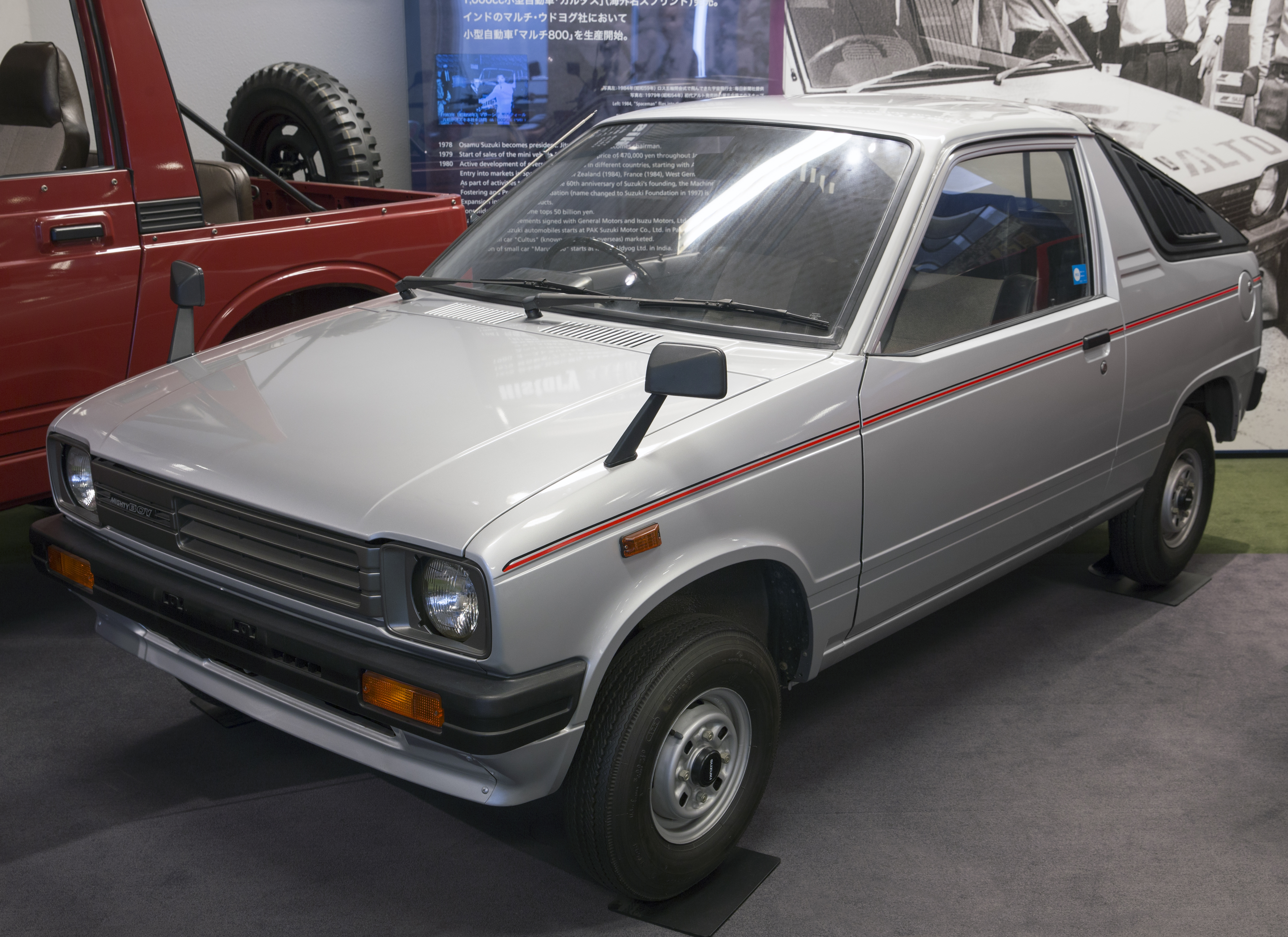
Pre-facelift Mighty Boy PS-QL

The rear-engine, rear-drive Suzuki Cervo (SS20), a kei-class sports coupé (or "personal car"), was replaced by a new front-engine, front-drive version based on the recently updated Alto and Fronte in June 1982. Suzuki then surprised everybody by developing a kei coupé utility based on the Cervo.

The Mighty Boy, model designation SS40T, was released in February 1983. While retaining the look of the Cervo with its wide B-pillars, the Mighty Boy had its own rear design. A small bed of no more than 600 mm (24 in) in length was of comparatively limited utility, but the truck's low-slung driving position was both more comfortable and completely unlike that of a cab-over kei truck. The relatively spacious cabin also offered sliding and reclining seats, and a reasonably large luggage area behind them.

The Mighty Boy was equipped with a transversely mounted 543 cc SOHC inline-3 engine (the F5A), fed by a single carburetor and with a compression ratio of 8.5:1. However, unlike its cousin, the Cervo, no turbo was available for the Mighty Boy. Driving the front wheels through a four-speed manual or optional two-speed automatic gearbox, the F5A delivered 28 PS JIS (21 kW) at 6,000 rpm at the flywheel, with 40 N⋅m (30 lb⋅ft) of torque at 4,000 rpm.

Pre-facelift Mighty Boys were fitted with 10" wheels, and sported a horizontally finned grille identical to the Cervo's. While the Cervo used rectangular headlights, the Mighty Boy, as befitting the cheapest car available in Japan, used cheaper round sealed beam units on most versions. The dashboard, seats, and steering wheel were not from the Cervo, but instead from the Alto Van (SS40V). Facelift PS-L models received unique seats, which, although still similar to those featured in the Cervo CS/G, featured a customised embossed "Mighty Boy" logo.

The range consisted of two variants, largely corresponding to the Cervo CS and CS-D/CS-QD:

- PS-A - This 'base' model carried over the 10" wheels from the initial Mighty Boy and was only available with a four-speed manual transmission.
- PS-L/PS-QL - These models were equipped with bucket seats, chrome roof tie-down rails, a coupé-style rear deck cover, a tachometer, and, in the PS-QL, a two-speed automatic gearbox.

=== Facelift ===
In early 1985, the facelifted Mighty Boy received minor cosmetic upgrades, including a restyled front grille and mirrors. The costlier PS-L variant also benefitted from a five-speed manual gearbox, new seats, larger 12" wheels, and rectangular headlights. A new carburetor increased power and torque somewhat, to 31 PS (23 kW) at 6,000 rpm and 43 N⋅m (32 lb⋅ft) at 3,500 rpm. Australian cars were all of the facelifted type and claimed 22.7 kW (30.9 PS; 30.4 hp) and 43.1 Nm at 3,500 rpm - more or less identical to the Japanese specifications.

By January 1988, a new Cervo had been presented and the SS40C was discontinued, bringing with it the end of the Mighty Boy.

== Export markets ==
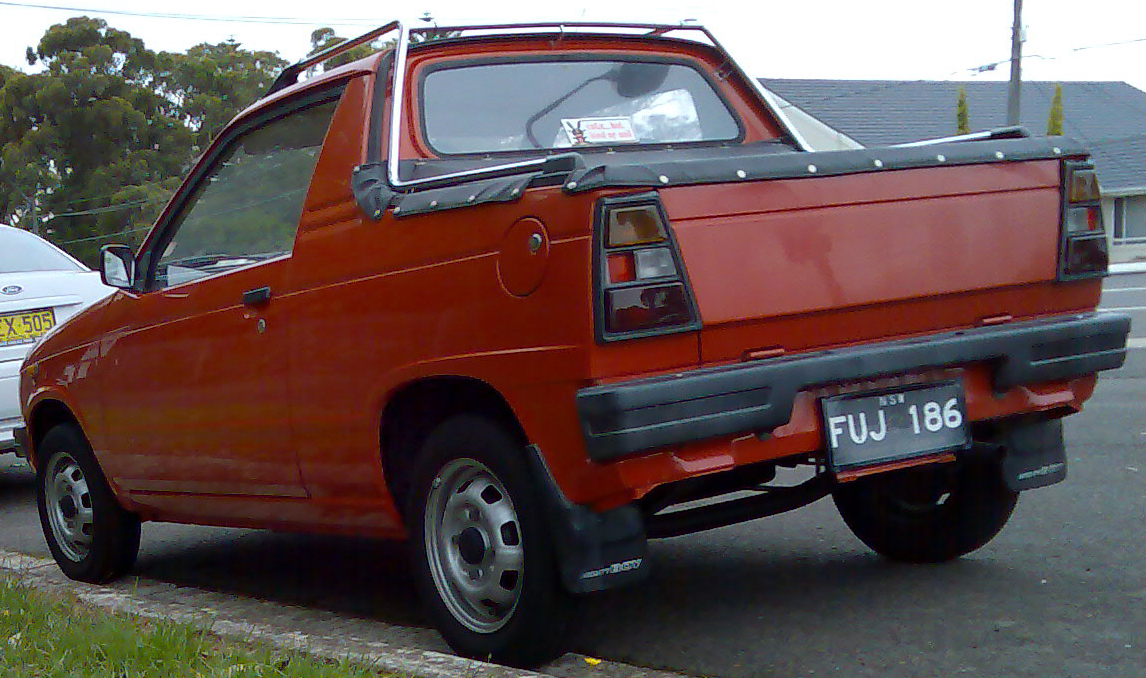
Australian-market Mighty Boy with luggage rails

The only regular export markets for the Suzuki Mighty Boy were Australia and Cyprus between 1985 and 1988. Imported through Suzuki and Ateco, Australia received a hybrid of the Japanese PS-A and PS-QL second generation Mighty Boy that included chrome roof rails, bucket seats and 12" wheels. Specifications did not include such items as a tachometer or a five-speed manual gearbox, but the two-speed automatic was an available option. The manual version sold for AU$5,495 when introduced to Australia, making it the cheapest automobile available there at the time. The low price and cheeky advertising campaign meant initial sales were very strong, leading the importer to joke that they would "have to consider limiting sales to one Mighty Boy per person."

About 2,800 were imported, but only 300 to 400 remain.
