= WJZ =

WJZ may currently refer to:

- WJZ (AM), a radio station (1300 AM) licensed to Baltimore, Maryland, United States
- WJZ-TV, a television station (virtual channel 13, digital channel 11) licensed to Baltimore, Maryland, United States
- WJZ-FM, a radio station (105.7 FM) licensed to Catonsville, Maryland, United States

WJZ previously referred to:

- WABC (AM), a radio station (770 AM) licensed to New York, New York, United States, which used the call sign WJZ from 1921 to 1953
- WABC-TV, a television station (channel 7 analog/digital) licensed to New York, New York, United States, which used the call sign WJZ-TV from 1948 to 1953
- WPLJ, a radio station (95.5 FM) licensed to New York, New York, United States, which used the call sign WJZ-FM from 1948 to 1953
