= Suzuki Cervo =

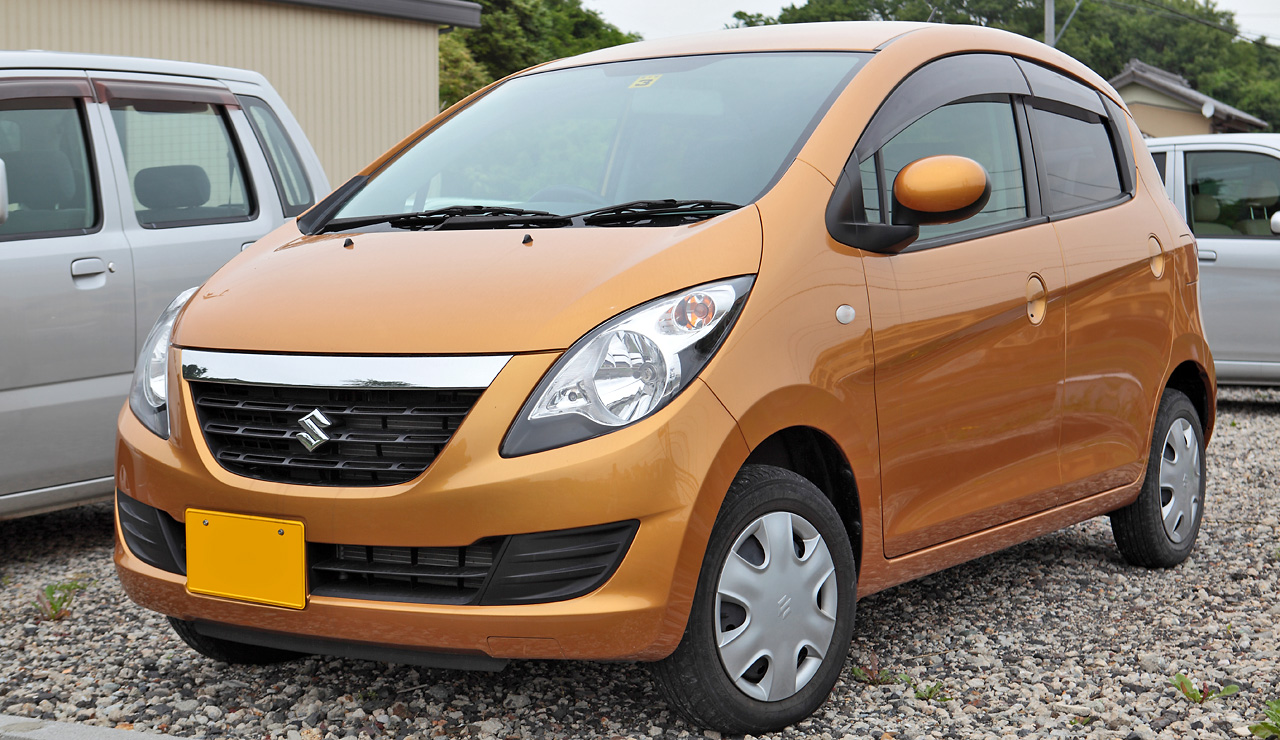
- Fifth generation Cervo

Overview
- Manufacturer: Suzuki
- Production: 1977–1998; 2006–2009

Body and chassis
- Class: Kei car
- Body style: 3/5-door hatchback; 2-door fastback (1977–1990)
- Related: Suzuki Fronte/Alto

Chronology
- Predecessor: Suzuki Fronte Coupe
- Successor: Suzuki Alto (fifth generation); Suzuki MR Wagon (for 2006 launch)

The Suzuki Cervo (Japanese: スズキ・セルボ, Hepburn: Suzuki Serubo) is a kei car manufactured by Suzuki Motor Corporation. Introduced in 1976 as the successor to the Suzuki Fronte Coupé, the Cervo name was originally affixed to a kei sports coupe, and then to models derived from the Suzuki Alto. The nameplate was retired between 1998 and 2006, and again in December 2009.

== Cervo SS20 (first generation) ==
SS20 Cervo
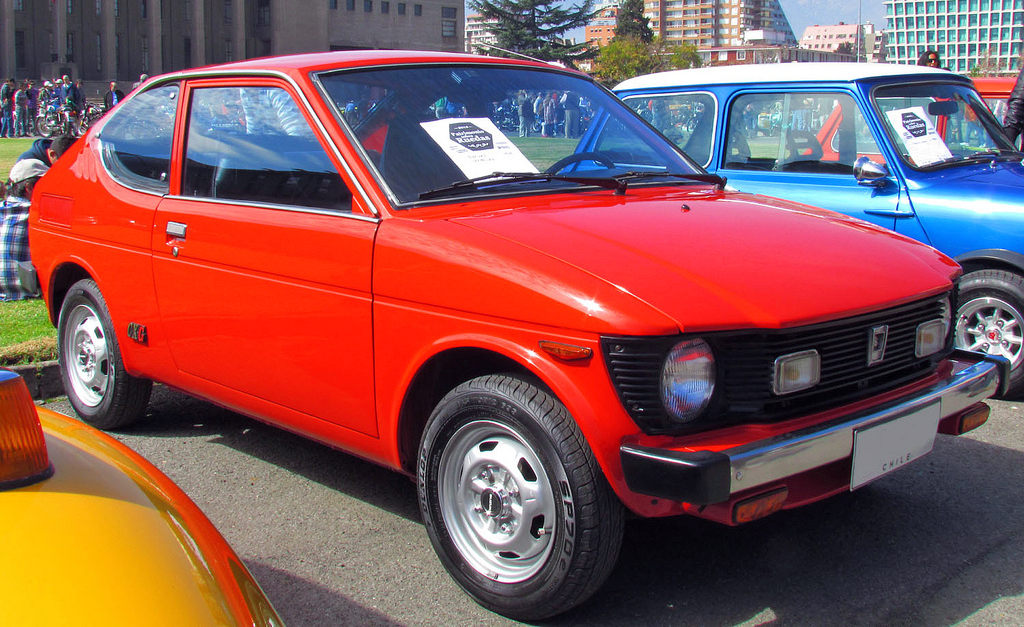
- 1979 Cervo CX-G

Overview
- Also called: Suzuki SC100
- Production: October 1977–June 1982
- Assembly: Kosai Assembly Plant, Hamana-gun, Shizuoka, Japan
- Designer: Giorgetto Giugiaro at Italdesign

Body and chassis
- Body style: 2+2, 2-door coupé hatchback
- Layout: RR layout
- Related: Suzuki Fronte 7-S

Powertrain
- Engine: 539 cc T5A two-stroke I3; 797 cc F8A OHC I4; 970 cc F10A OHC I4
- Transmission: 4-speed manual

Dimensions
- Length: 3,190 mm (125.6 in)
- Width: 1,395 mm (54.9 in)
- Height: 1,210–1,230 mm (48–48 in)
- Curb weight: 535–625 kg (1,179–1,378 lb)

Chronology
- Predecessor: Suzuki Fronte Coupé

Suzuki was the first company to offer a kei car in 1955. One interesting departure from other Kei cars was the Fronte Coupé introduced in September 1971. It was a 2+2 (or a strict 2-seater) Giugiaro-designed mini GT based on the rear-engine Suzuki Fronte, measuring a mere 2995 mm. It used a 359 cc two-stroke engine developing 31, 34 or 37 PS (35 in later models) depending on equipment level. The Fronte Coupé was discontinued in June, 1976, as it didn't suit the new Kei Jidosha limits, nor the stricter emissions regulations.

After a hiatus of over a year, Suzuki returned to the sports minicar market with the new Cervo in October 1977. The SS20 Cervo was mainly a JDM model (although it was also sold as a LHD in Chile) with a 539 cc three-cylinder, two-stroke engine. The SS20 used the chassis from the 1976 Fronte 7-S, but was equipped with the larger T5A engine (this was the rear-mounted version of the LJ50 used in the Jimny and Fronte Hatch, also known as the T5B in the FF Alto/Fronte). The body was based on the Giugiaro designed Fronte Coupé, but with a bulge in the front and bigger bumpers which led to the loss of some of the original's grace. The Fronte Coupé's side panels, doors, and side glass were retained, with the car made wider and extended somewhat in the front and rear. Instead of square headlights, the Cervo received round items. The new rear glass hatch added convenience, allowing access to the rear cargo area. With the rear seats folded, one could fit 6.9 cu ft (195 L) of luggage there, with an additional 1 cu ft (30 L) available in the front compartment.

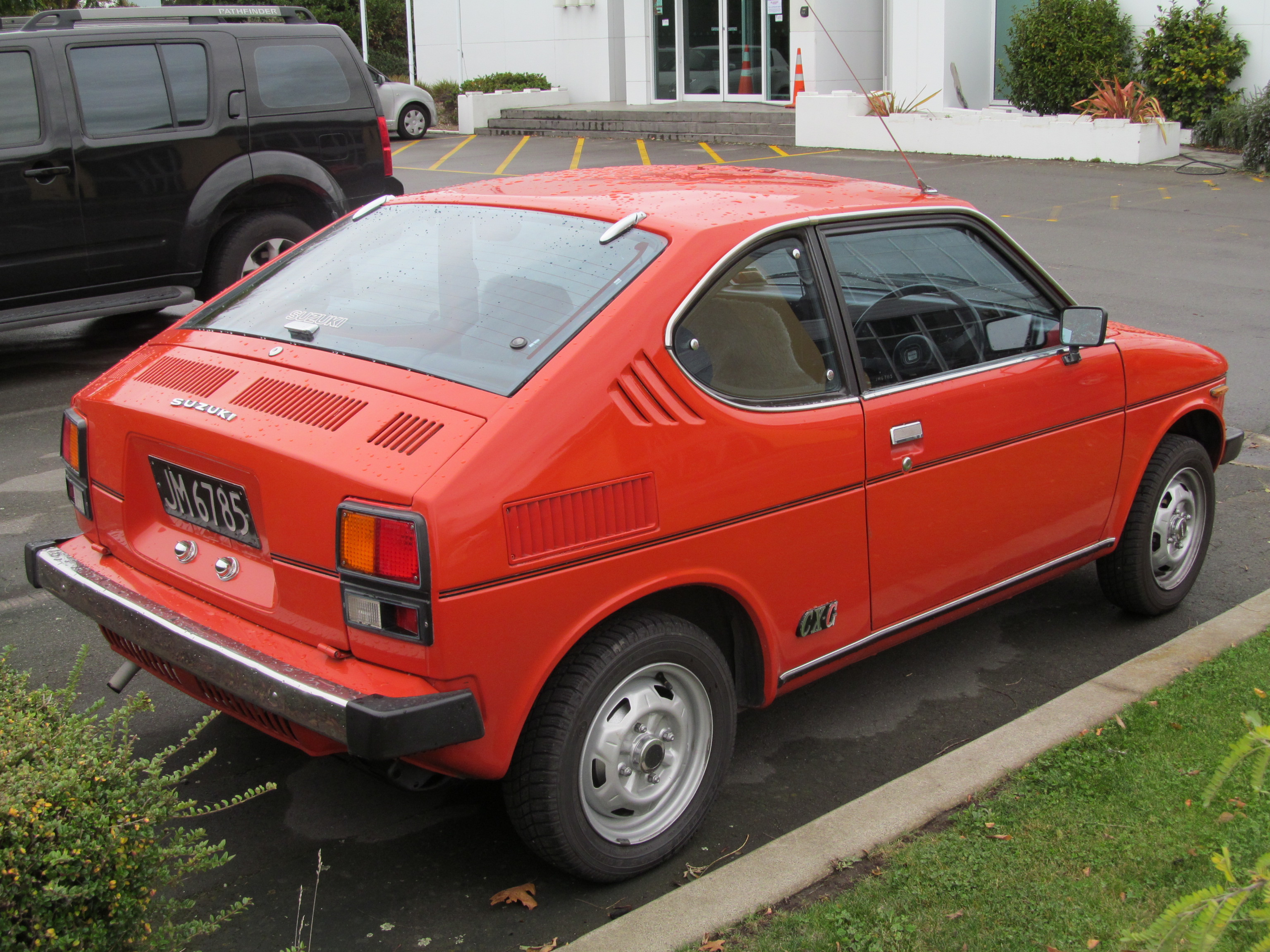
1980 Suzuki CX-G (New Zealand)

Worse was that the new 539 cc engine was strangled by emissions requirements. Whereas the most powerful 360 cc version had offered 37 PS (27 kW) at 6000 rpm, the new T5A only provided 28 PS (21 kW) at 5000 rpm; it also had an additional 55–80 kg (121–176 lb) to drag around. To keep acceleration acceptable, gearing was rather low, keeping claimed top speed to 120 km/h (75 mph). This was ten more than the Fronte 7-S sedan version could achieve, thanks to lower wind resistance, but Car Graphic was only able to reach 111.80 km/h (69 mph) when testing the car in 1977, with the 0–400 m sprint taking 23 seconds. The engine ran out of breath past 7000 rpm. Suzuki was aware that the Cervo, unlike its predecessor, was no longer a mini GT car. The advertising also reflected this, generally targeting the female demographic (except for the sporty CX-G version).

Equipment levels ranged from the entry-level CX (円608,000 in 1977), via the "ladies' version" CX-L to the top-of-the-line CX-G (円698,000). The lowest priced CX model received microscopic hubcaps, painted black, as were the bumpers (chromed on better equipped versions). The CX-L was added in September 1978 and had brighter trim, to specifically target feminine customers. Only the CX-G had front disc brakes; the others had to make do with drums all around. As implied by the weight distribution, the rear-engine lead to a somewhat twitchy front end. In the SC100s, the heavier four-cylinder engine was countered by a balancing weight in the front bumper.

The SS20 Cervo received a very minor facelift in 1978, consisting mainly of interior upgrades. In June 1982, the rear-engined Cervo was discontinued in favor of a more conventionally laid out replacement, the SS40. In Chile the Cervo was originally only sold with the 970 cc F10A engine; a May 1979 drastic lowering on tariffs on cars of less than 850 cc meant that the 797 cc F8A inline-four became available in that market. The chassis code of this model is SC80. This was sold alongside a better equipped model with the 1 litre F10A as used in the SC100.

=== SC100 ===
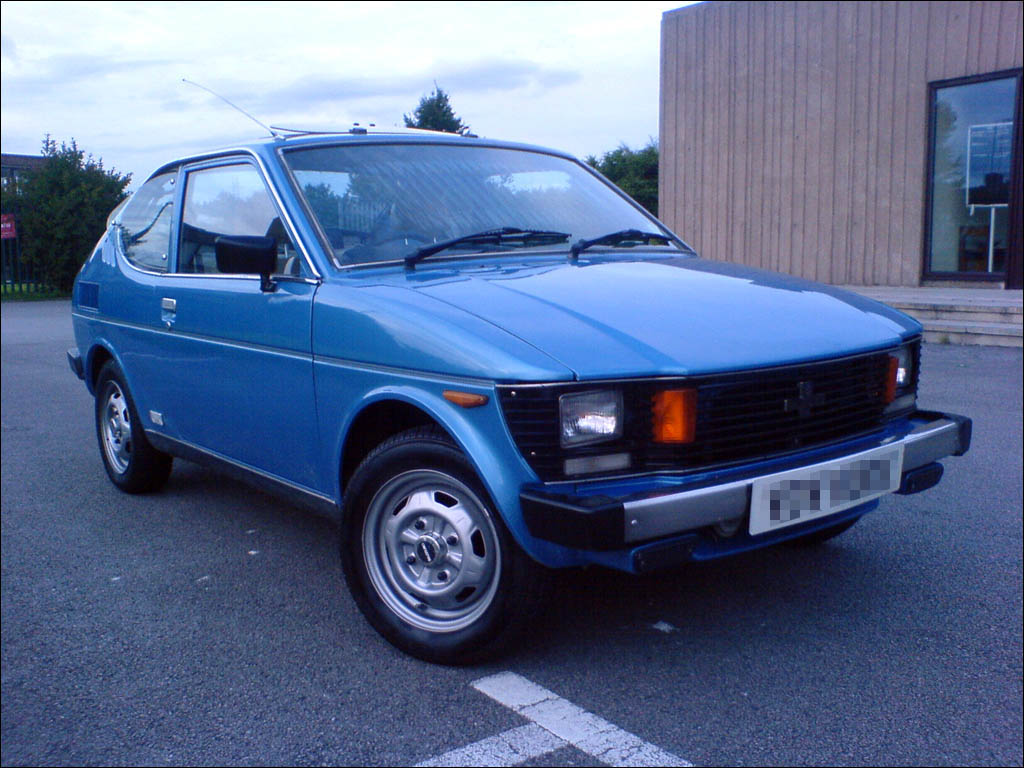
Suzuki SC100 "Whizzkid" GX in Iceland Blue Metallic (09R)

For export, Suzuki transformed the Cervo into the SC100, first introduced in April 1978. It had its European premiere in February 1979, at Amsterdam's AutoRAI. The SC100 was known in the UK by the nickname "Whizzkid". The three-cylinder engine was replaced by a rear-mounted 970 cc four-cylinder F10A engine (later used in the SJ410) developing 47 PS (35 kW). The top speed was 142.8 km/h (89 mph) in a contemporary test. The body differed from the Cervo's in that the windshield was not as steeply raked, necessitating a different doorframe and side window as well. Square headlights were used in European markets, with either round or square ones used elsewhere. In European markets the grille incorporated the chunky indicator lenses, which were normally positioned in a space underneath the bumper – these openings were blanked with plastic grilles.

In the UK it was only available as the lavishly equipped SC100 GX, while in other countries it was also offered as a CX or the more luxurious CX-G. The GX, with a cigar lighter, reclining front seats, and independent all-round suspension, sold for £2,400 upon introduction (the slightly larger Alto of the same period sold for £3375). The marketing campaign was further helped by an enthusiastic owner, the late LJK Setright, long-time CAR magazine columnist. Other markets included the Netherlands, Hong Kong, South Africa, New Zealand and several Latin American countries.

It was sold in Europe from 1979 to 1982, when production ended. There was only one model change, when dashboard and column switches were modified in January 1980. With demand always outstripping supply, British importer Heron Suzuki sold 4696 SC100s in Britain, where the car has since then gained minor classic status. Nimag sold 3290 SC100s in the Netherlands, while the 1299 remaining cars were delivered to New Zealand, South Africa, and Latin America. This production includes the Chilean SS80 version. As of mid 2014, there were 96 "Whizzkids" registered with the Driver and Vehicle Licensing Agency (DVLA) in the UK.

| engine | F10A, 970 cc OHC I4 |
| power | 47–50 hp (35–37 kW) at 5000 rpm |
| torque | 83 N⋅m (61 lb⋅ft) at 2500 (or 3000) rpm |
| transmission | 4-speed manual |
| length × width × height | 3,190 mm × 1,395 mm × 1,230 mm (125.6 in × 54.9 in × 48.4 in) |
| weight | 625–660 kg (1,378–1,455 lb) |

== Cervo SS40 (2nd generation) ==
SS40 Cervo
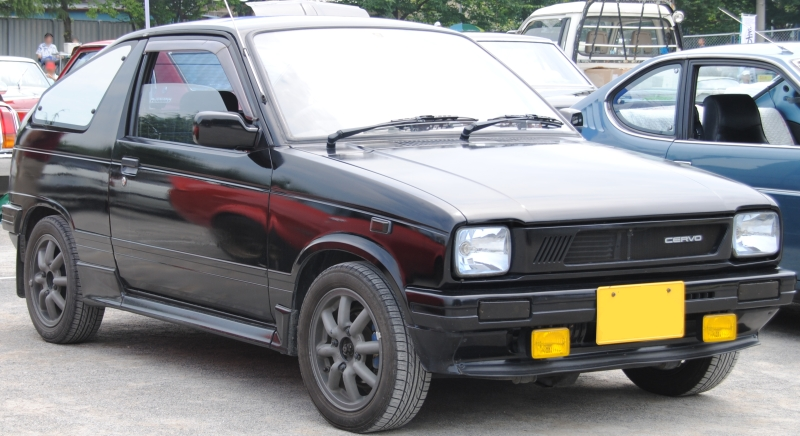

Overview
- Production: June 1982–February 1988
- Assembly: Kosai, Shizuoka, Japan

Body and chassis
- Body style: 4-seat, 2-door coupé hatchback
- Layout: Transverse engine, FF
- Related: Suzuki Alto; Suzuki Fronte; Suzuki Mighty Boy

Powertrain
- Engine: 543 cc F5A I3: 29 PS (21 kW) at 6,000 rpm, 41 Nm at 4,000 rpm (SOHC 6V carburetor); 31 PS (23 kW) at 6,000 rpm, 44 Nm at 4,000 rpm (SOHC 6V carburetor); 40 PS (29 kW) at 6,000 rpm, 54 Nm at 4,000 rpm (SOHC 6V carburetor turbo)
- Transmission: 4/5-speed manual 2-speed automatic

Dimensions
- Wheelbase: 2,150 mm (84.6 in)
- Length: 3,195 mm (125.8 in)
- Width: 1,395 mm (54.9 in)
- Height: 1,290 mm (50.8 in)
- Curb weight: 530–550 kg (1,170–1,210 lb)

In June 1982, an all-new Cervo was presented. Based on the underpinnings of the recently changed Alto/Fronte, the Cervo now sported front-wheel drive with a transversally mounted four-stroke engine. The F5A engine was the same as used in the SS40 Fronte. A twin-choke carb meant a whopping 29 PS (21 kW) was available, rather than the 28 PS (21 kW) in the everyday Alto/Mighty Boy. The Cervo offered a lower, much more sporty driving position than its Alto/Fronte sister cars. Anyone over 172 cm (5 ft 8 in) would certainly hit their head on the ceiling. Strangely, considering its supposedly sporty character, the Cervo was higher geared than its Fronte sister car. Top speed, however, either remained the same as the 110 km/h (68 mph) of the Fronte (according to one source), or a little bit higher, at 115 km/h (71 mph), according to another. To distinguish the Cervo from the other SS40 versions, its model code was SS40C (Alto: SS40V, Fronte: SS40S, Mighty Boy: SS40T).

The new more aerodynamic body looked a bit more plain than its sharp predecessor, but the fastback shape echoed Giugiaro's original design. The headlights were square, there was more glass than on the SS20 (but with a broad B-pillar) and the larger rear glass hatch (still not a proper hatch) now offered better access to a much more usable luggage space. The rear seat folded; some versions even offered a remote opening mechanism and heated rear window. The SS40 was also the first Cervo to offer automatic transmission, a two-speed. This all reflected a steady move away from the original "mini Gran Turismo" concept towards a much softer "Personal Car".

When introduced, only a CS (4MT) or CS-Q (2AT) were offered (円580,000/620,000). In late September the more upscale CS-L (5MT) and CS-QL (2AT) were added to the lineup, offering (partially) fabric covered seats and a number of other conveniences at a starting price of 円687,000. All had 10-inch steel wheels. The automatic transmission was never too popular, offering only two gear ratios and considerably worse acceleration and gas mileage (down 20 percent), along with a higher price.

In May 1983, less than a year after introduction, the Cervo received a light facelift. In light of new regulations, wing mirrors were moved to the doors and the screw holes on the fenders were covered up. The mechanical changes were light: a slightly adjusted cam profile, the compression rate was upped to 9.7:1 (previously 9.5), the EGR and catalytic converter were improved and the engine received an automatic choke and transistor ignition. Power remained 29 PS (21 kW). There were also radial tired versions introduced, and disc brakes for the top-of-the-line CS-G. The lineup also received an overhaul, now looking as follows:

| CS / CS-Q | Base versions, 4MT / 2AT. No radio. Single speed wipers. | 円580,000 / 円620,000 |
| CS-D / CS-QD | Slightly upscale, 4MT/2AT. AM radio. Intermittent wipers. | 円650,000 / 円690,000 |
| CS-F | 5MT, fuel efficient version which helped replace the CS-L. Radial tires. | 円719,000 |
| CS-G | Sporty version, 5MT. Rev counter, 12-inch wheels, optional alloys. Front disc brakes. | 円730,000 |

There was also a CS-M / CS-QM special edition (based on the CS-D) in either an all-white or an all-red paint scheme with a black-and-red interior (円633,000 / 円673,000). The CS-G was aimed at a more masculine clientele, and was the first SS40 Cervo to use male models in the advertising. The CS-F had a very high 5th gear and offered a 5% gas mileage improvement over other Cervos.

An even sportier version appeared in November 1983, when the turbocharged CT and CT-G versions were offered. The F5A Turbo was Suzuki's first forced induction car engine and produced 40 PS (29 kW) and a useful 54 N⋅m (40 lb⋅ft). It received an electronic carburetor and a lower compression rate of 8,6:1. Only a five-speed manual transmission was available, and front disc brakes were standard. The CT weighed in at 560 kg (1,235 lb), prices were 円748,000 and 円898,000 respectively. A two-tone red-and-black interior and dummy hood scoop added to the Turbo's sporty looks, while the CT-G also received a rev counter. Top speed has been quoted at 135 km/h (84 mph).

In January 1985 another minor facelift occurred, with new, more comfortable seats and a new front grille. The interior also sported more fabric, an improved manual shifter and a half-leather steering wheel on the CT-G. The side mirrors were now mounted in the corner between the door and A-pillar, rather than on the door itself. The CT-G received body colored bumpers and mirrors, which was optional on lesser versions. Power output was up to 31 PS (23 kW), due to a new carburetor. Top speed according to German Auto Katalog was up by five, to 120 km/h (75 mph). The lineup consisted of the CT-G (sporty Turbo), CS-G (sporty NA), CS-D / CS-QD ("deluxe" versions - with a vinyl rear seat nonetheless) and CS / CS-Q (standard version).

With Kei car sales shrinking overall and the Cervo losing market share, sales were dropping precipitously. In February 1987 the second-generation Cervo received its third and final update. The Turbo was discontinued and the lineup rationalized to two versions, the sporty CS-G with a 5-speed manual and the lower grade CS-D with either a 4-speed manual or the 2-speed automatic. As further rationalization, all models now had roll-type safety belts (hitherto, CS and CS-D versions had come with fixed belts), front disc brakes and air conditioning.

By January 1988, a new Cervo had been presented and the SS40C was discontinued shortly thereafter. Due to its lesser sales, the SS40C never received as many technical improvements as its Alto sister model. The Alto Turbo gained fuel injection and other technologies, but the ostensibly sporty Cervo had to make do with a carburetted 40 PS (29 kW). These days, many Cervo owners modify their cars by bolting on parts from later Altos, making the Cervo live up to its sporty appearance.

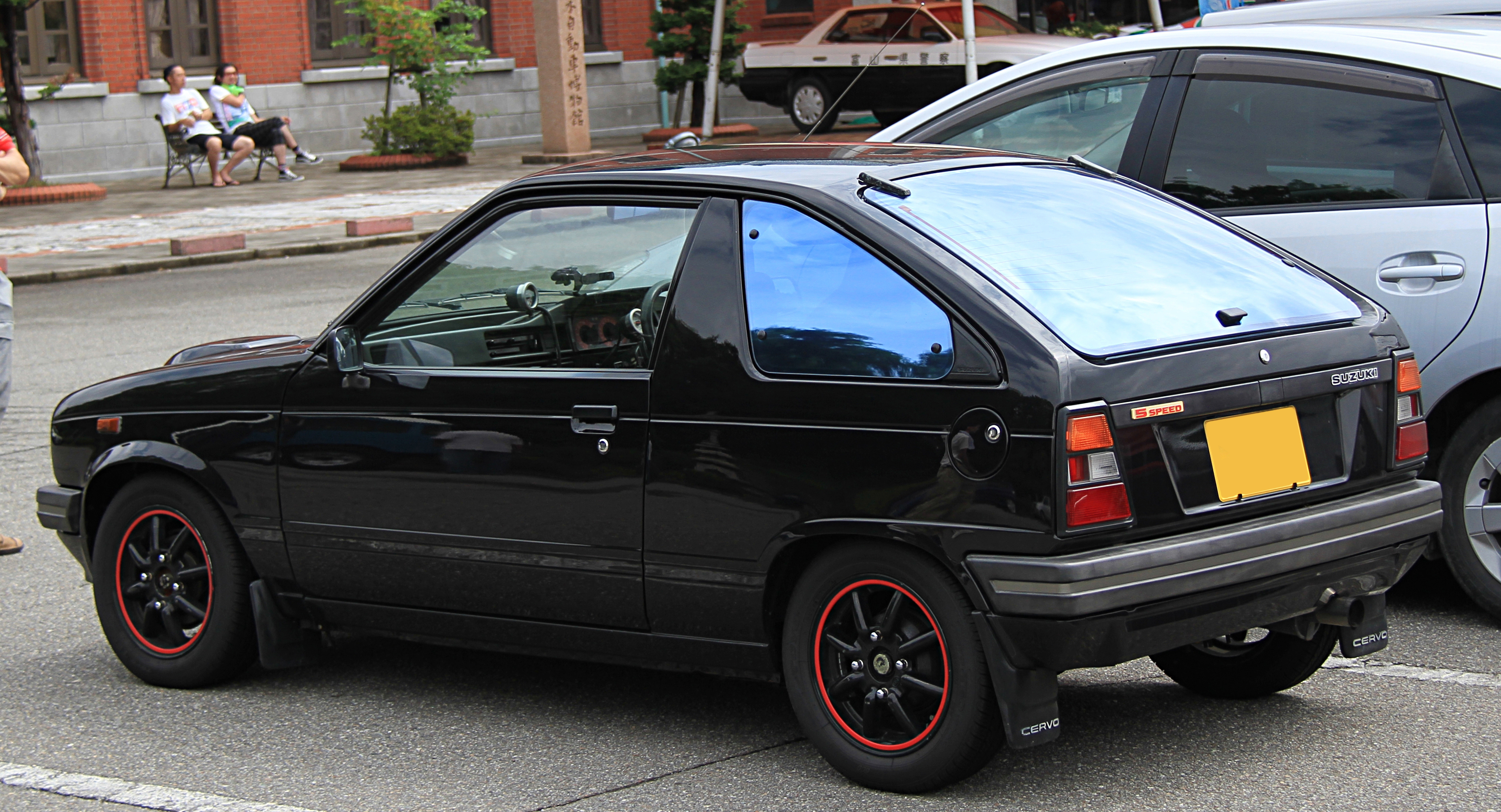
Suzuki Cervo CT-G (rear)

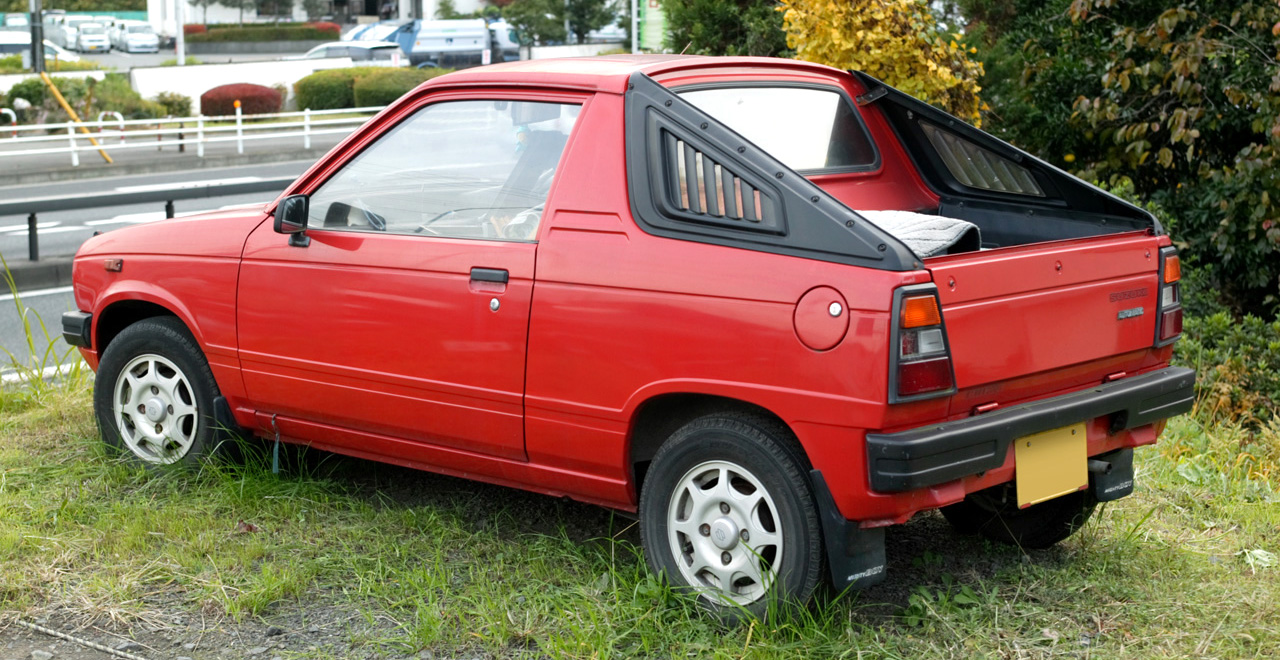
The Cervo-based Mighty Boy was an interesting offshoot, the one and only coupé utility in the 550 cc class

== Cervo CG72V/CH72V (3rd generation) ==
Cervo CG72V/CH72V
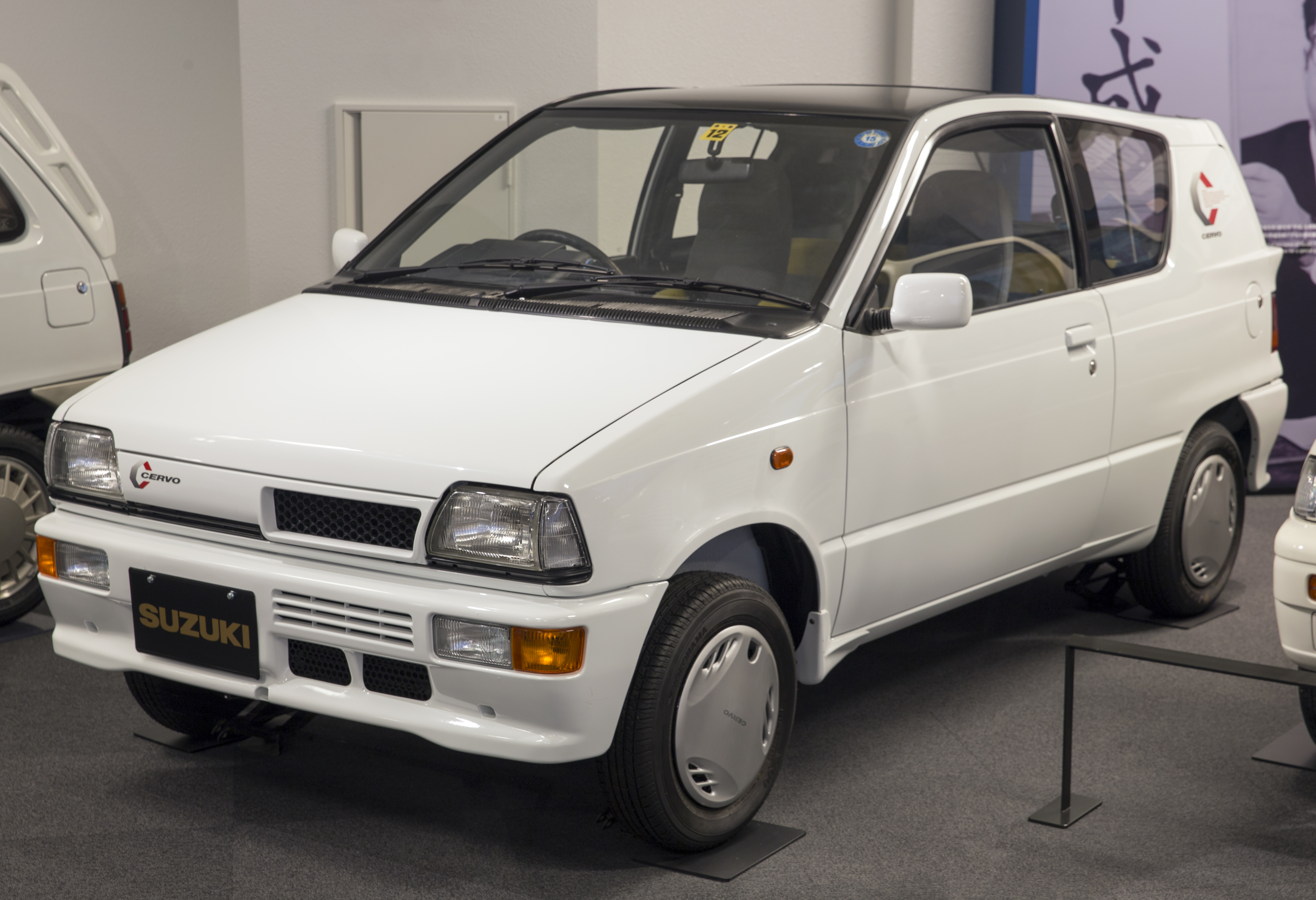

Overview
- Production: February 1988–May 1990
- Assembly: Kosai, Shizuoka, Japan

Body and chassis
- Body style: 4-seat, 3-door hatchback
- Layout: FF/4WD layout
- Related: Suzuki Alto; Suzuki Fronte

Powertrain
- Engine: 547 cc F5B SOHC 12V I3

Dimensions
- Wheelbase: 2,175 mm (85.6 in)
- Length: 3,195 mm (125.8 in)
- Width: 1,395 mm (54.9 in)
- Height: 1,330–1,350 mm (52.4–53.1 in)
- Curb weight: 590–640 kg (1,300–1,410 lb)

On January 22, 1988, the next Cervo was introduced. Suzuki were accentuating the Cervo's van capabilities this time around, with a squat, boxy rear end which gave the car an exceedingly bizarre appearance in combination with the front clip and door skins of the Alto/Fronte. The C-pillar was very wide, the front part of the roof was made of glass, there was a small wraparound rear spoiler and a more prominent one at the top of the hatchback lid. One nickname in Japan was "Airbrick", while others referred to it as the "Side Alley Beauty" (横丁小町, Yokocho Komachi) - hinting at the Cervo's continued popularity with stylish young females. The interior was no less unusual than the outside: a large gray and bright yellow diagonal pattern covered the seats while white gauges added a touch of sportiness. Storage compartments abounded, in the thick C-pillars as well as in a central console.

The new Cervo benefited from various technical improvements made to the Alto/Fronte, fitting the new F5B SOHC 12-valve three-cylinder (carbureted). 40 PS (29 kW) at a peaky 7,500 rpm was available from 547 cc. Torque is 4.2 kg⋅m (41 N⋅m; 30 lb⋅ft) at 4,500 rpm. Three well-equipped models were available:

- CGXF front-wheel drive, 5MT. 円698,000 (CG72V)
- CGXL front-wheel drive, 3AT. 円750,000 (CG72V)
- CGXJ four-wheel drive, 5MT. 円770,000 (CH72V)
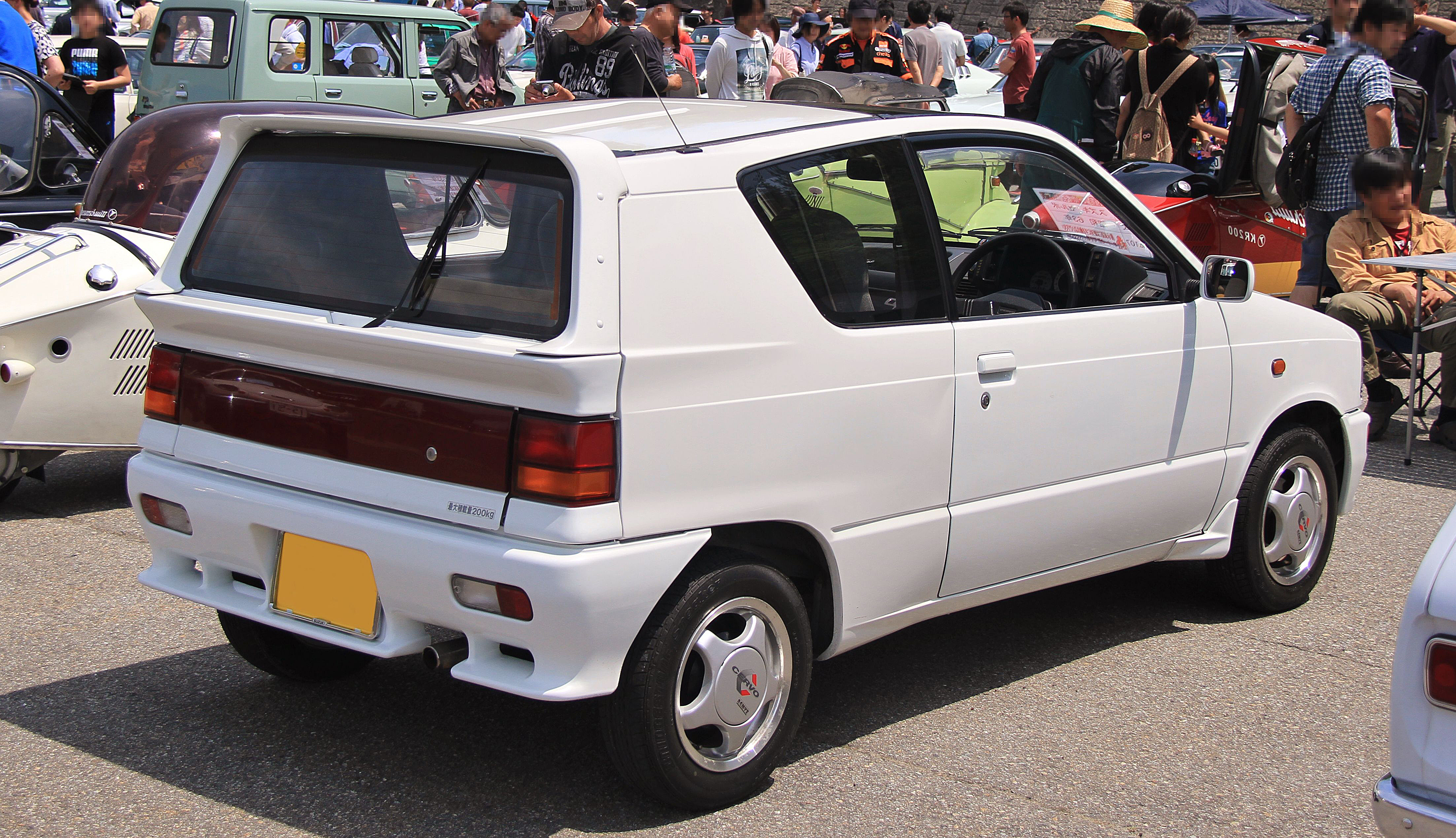
Rear view

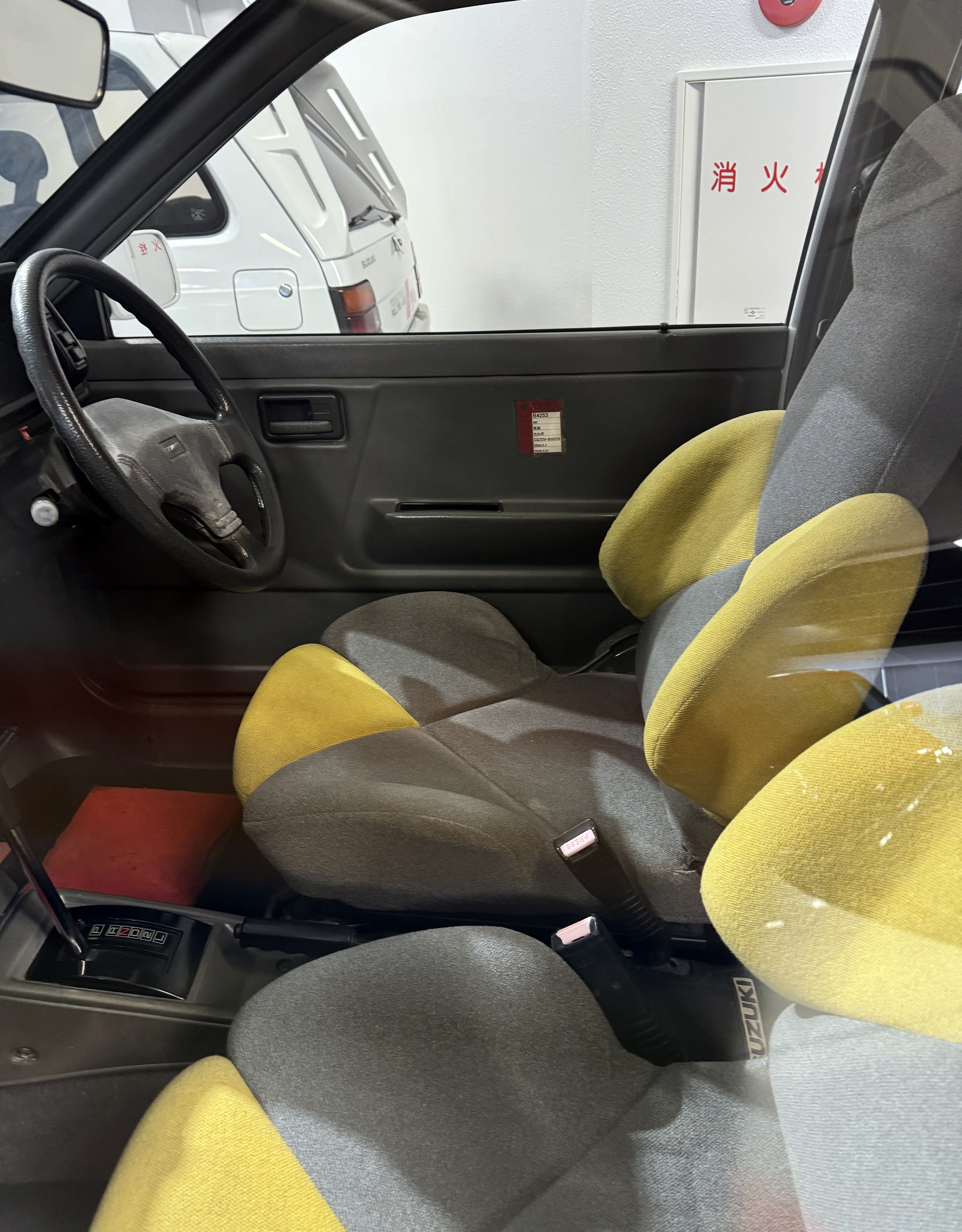
Interior (CGPL)

In March, three models with the world's first electric power steering (CGPF/CGPL/CGPJ) were added to the lineup, at a juicy 円150,000 surcharge. Called the Gokigen Pack (ごきげん; "good mood"), the price also included air conditioning and a high-powered Mitsubishi Diatone stereo using the C-pillars for a speaker installation instead of providing cubbyholes as on the regular version. Actress and pop idol Yuka Ōnishi (大西結花) was the spokesperson for the Cervo's ad campaign, while an all female motorcycle racing team (Team Angela) raced a turbocharged Cervo in the 1988 Rallye des Pharaons.

However, it was all to no avail: The rivals, Daihatsu's new Leeza and Mazda's Autozam Carol both sold much better. Combined with the removal of certain tax breaks for small cargo vehicles, this meant that the Cervo's already narrow slot in the market had essentially disappeared. When the new 660 cc Kei regulations were introduced, Suzuki decided to call it quits rather than spend a lot of money to update such a slow-selling vehicle and Cervo production ended in May 1990.

== Cervo Mode (4th generation) ==
(CN21-22S / CP21-22S / CN31-32S / CP31-32S)

Cervo Mode CN21S/22S/31S/32S
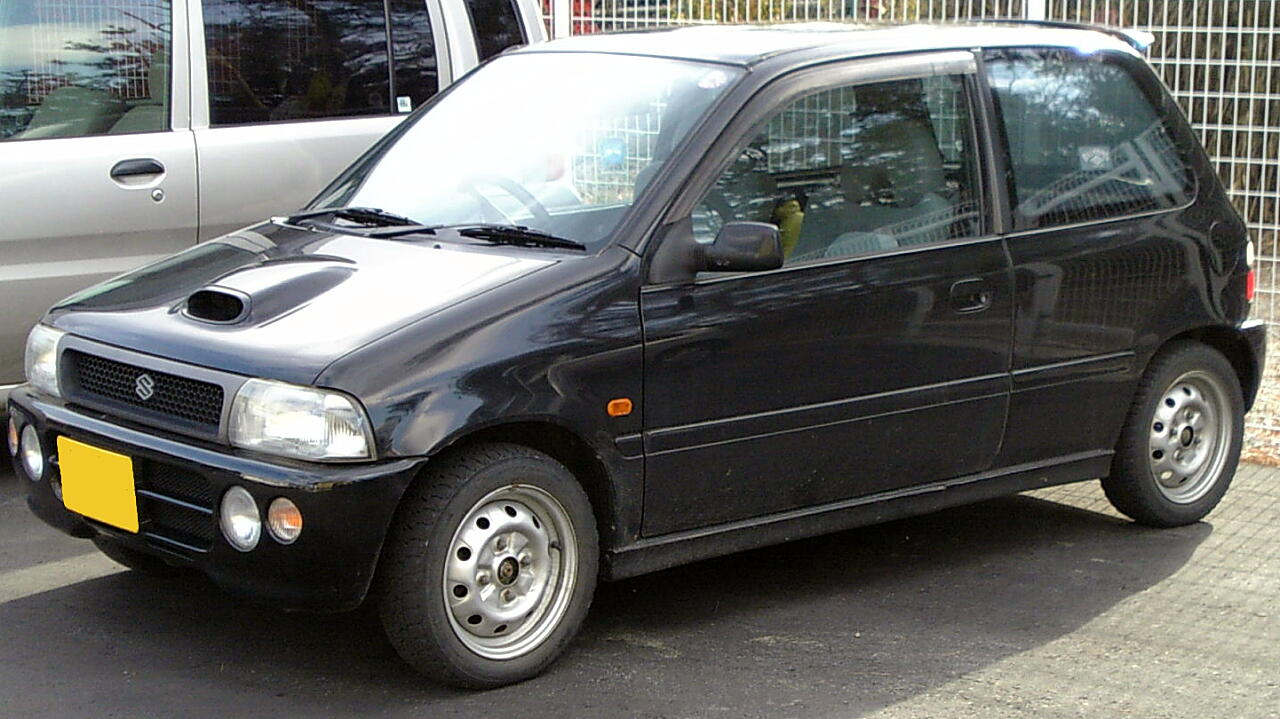

Overview
- Production: July 1990–October 1998

Body and chassis
- Body style: 3-/5-door hatchback
- Layout: FF / 4WD layout
- Related: Suzuki Alto; Maruti Zen

Powertrain
- Engine: 657 cc F6A I3; 657 cc F6A turbo I3; 658 cc F6B DOHC turbo I4

Dimensions
- Length: 3,295 mm (129.7 in)
- Width: 1,395 mm (54.9 in)
- Height: 1,370–1,410 mm (54–56 in)
- Curb weight: 620–750 kg (1,370–1,650 lb)

Again targeting the female demographic, the Cervo nameplate made a return in July 1990. Now, however, reflecting the new Kei Jidosha standards, the engine had grown by 110 cc and it was 100 mm (3.9 in) longer. More shockingly, the car was of a traditional two-box design, sold initially only as a 3-door hatchback. Eventually, the Cervo Mode developed into a full range of cars, coinciding with the discontinuation of the Fronte which had left a niche above the "regular" Alto. Reflecting the desired clientele, heartthrob Yūji Oda (織田裕二) appeared in the marketing campaign.

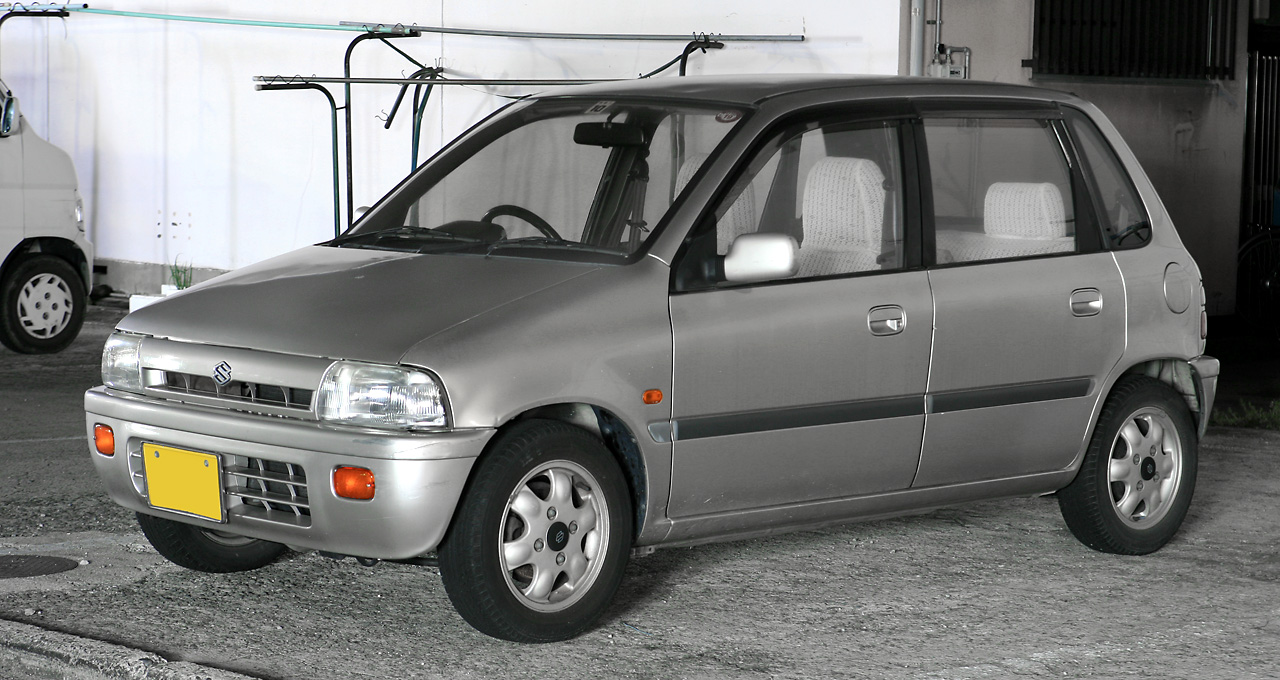
Cervo Mode five-door

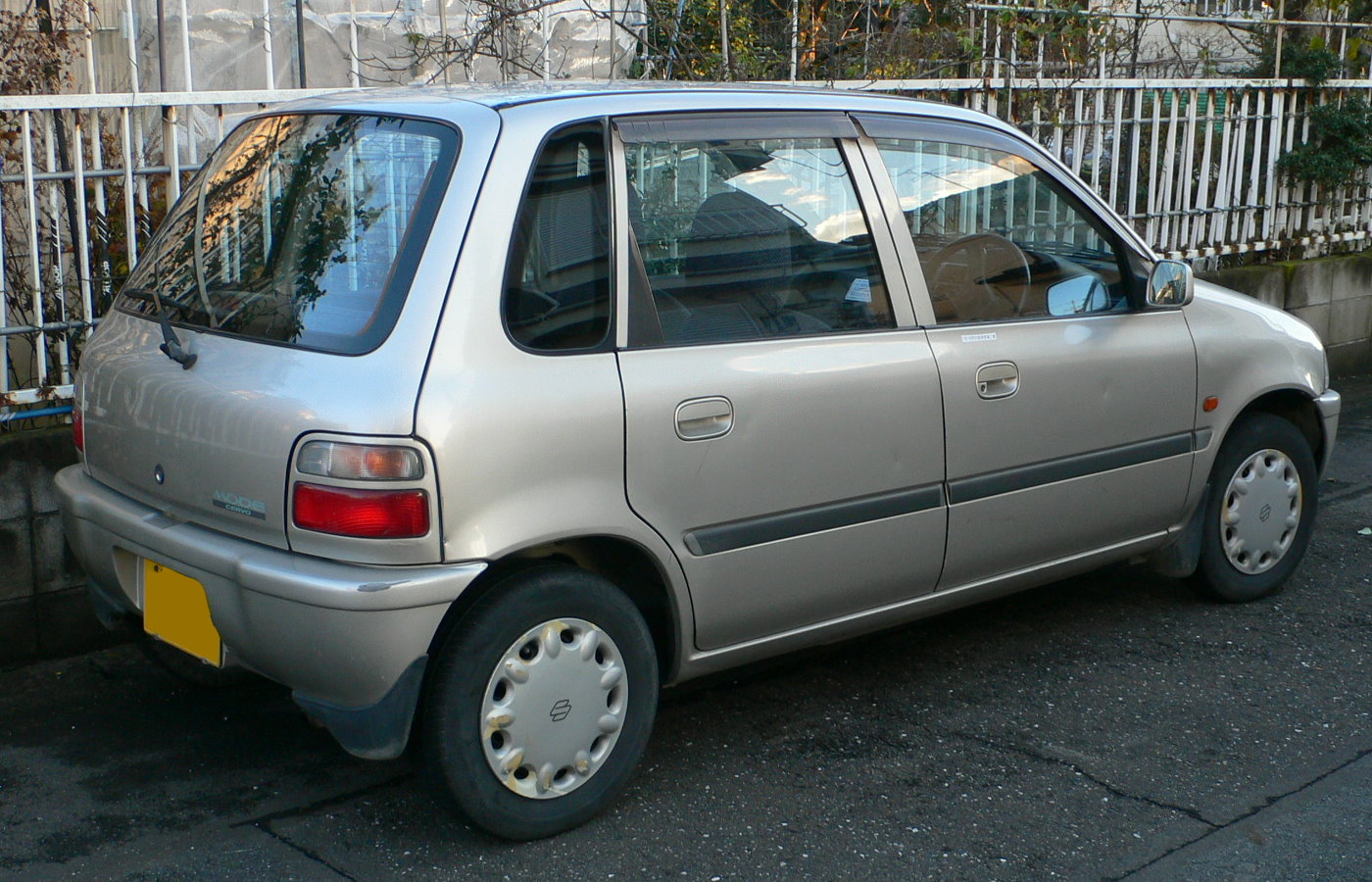
Rear view

The Cervo Mode was initially only available with turbocharged 660 cc engines of either 3- or 4-cylinder configurations. In November 1990 a 5-door version followed, along with lesser engines. These non-turbocharged versions were called "sedans" while the original versions were called the "sports" series. The Mode looked more pedestrian than previous Cervos, with the Maruti built version (the "Zen") in fact being marketed as the Alto in Europe and Australia. The Zen/Alto looks similar but is actually twenty cm longer and ten wider, as well as fitted with a one-liter engine.

The Cervo was a bit sportier than it appeared at first sight, however. The hottest version (the SR-Four) was the second Kei car to have a four-cylinder (after the 550 cc Subaru Rex and its EN05 engine), but the first to have a 16-valve DOHC Turbo Intercooler engine (F6B), and was also the first to be equipped with Pirelli P700 tires as standard. ABS was optional, as was Full-time 4WD.

Specifications

1990 Suzuki Cervo Mode
| model | | gears | engine | power | weight | (lbs) |
|---|---|---|---|---|---|---|
| S-Turbo FF | CN21S | 5MT (3AT) | F6A, 657 cc 3-cyl | 61 PS (45 kW) at 6,000 rpm | 650 (670) kg | 1,433 (1,477) |
| S-Turbo 4WD | CP21S | 5MT | F6A, 657 cc 3-cyl | 61 PS (45 kW) at 6,000 rpm | 710 kg | 1,565 |
| SR-Turbo FF | CN21S | 5MT (3AT) | F6A, 657 cc 3-cyl | 61 PS (45 kW) at 6,000 rpm | 650 (670) kg | 1,433 (1,477) |
| SR-Turbo 4WD | CP21S | 5MT | F6A, 657 cc 3-cyl | 61 PS (45 kW) at 6,000 rpm | 710 kg | 1,565 |
| SR-Four FF | CN31S | 5MT | F6B, 658 cc 4-cyl | 64 PS (47 kW) at 7,000 rpm | 670 kg | 1,477 |
| SR-Four 4WD | CP31S | 5MT | F6B, 658 cc 4-cyl | 64 PS (47 kW) at 7,000 rpm | 730 kg | 1,609 |

By November 1990 the 52/55 PS (carbureted/EPI) non-turbo F6A SOHC 4-valve engine became available, available in a whole range of versions: M as three- or five-door (later only five), with manual or automatic transmissions and FWD or 4WD, a sportier S only as a three-door, and the luxurious L only as a five-door with the more powerful EPI engine - which also appeared in 4WDs equipped with automatics. In September 1991 the range was revised, receiving side impact protection and a high mounted brakelight. Since these were considered structural changes the car received a new set of model codes, becoming the CN22S/CP22S/CN32S/CP32S. The SR-Four now came with all-around disc brakes while the S-Turbo was discontinued. An FWD automatic MC version joined the range at the lower end, equipped with a column-mounted shifter. Other special versions abounded, with the luxurious F-Limited EPI 3-door joining in December 1991 and the somewhat cheaper, carbureted M Selection in April 1992. In July of that year, the 3-door, automatic only S Selection managed to find a slot in a pricelist now comprising a faintly ridiculous 27 variants. This didn't hinder Suzuki from adding more versions, the well-equipped LoFt (sic), in June 1994 and the A in April of that year.

In October, 1995, the lineup received a facelift and some minor technical changes. A 2-valve base version (the B, C and E), developing 42 PS (31 kW) joined. The carbureted 12-valve engine equipped the M Selection, the LoFt, FF versions of the S Selection, the X and the F-Limited. The 55 PS (40 kW) EPI version was also available in the 4WD M Selection. The SR-Turbo lost two valves per cylinder but gained an intercooler in the process, bringing claimed power up to the same 64 PS (47 kW) as in the more expensive SR-Four. Kei cars just so happen to be limited to 64 PS, but it was a badly kept secret that the four-cylinder F6B developed considerably more than that. The X was alone in being offered with a 4-speed automatic.

By May 1997, as the Wagon R (itself based on the Cervo Mode) was stealing ever more of the Cervo's sales, the turbocharged versions were discontinued as the lineup was shrunk to the S-Limited (42, 52 or 55 PS) and the M Selection (52/55 PS). The 52 PS (55 in the AT 4WD version) 3-door SR joined in January 1998, attempting to fill the gap left by the Turbocharged models. By October 1998, with new regulations looming, the Cervo was once again discontinued.

=== Cervo C (Classic) ===
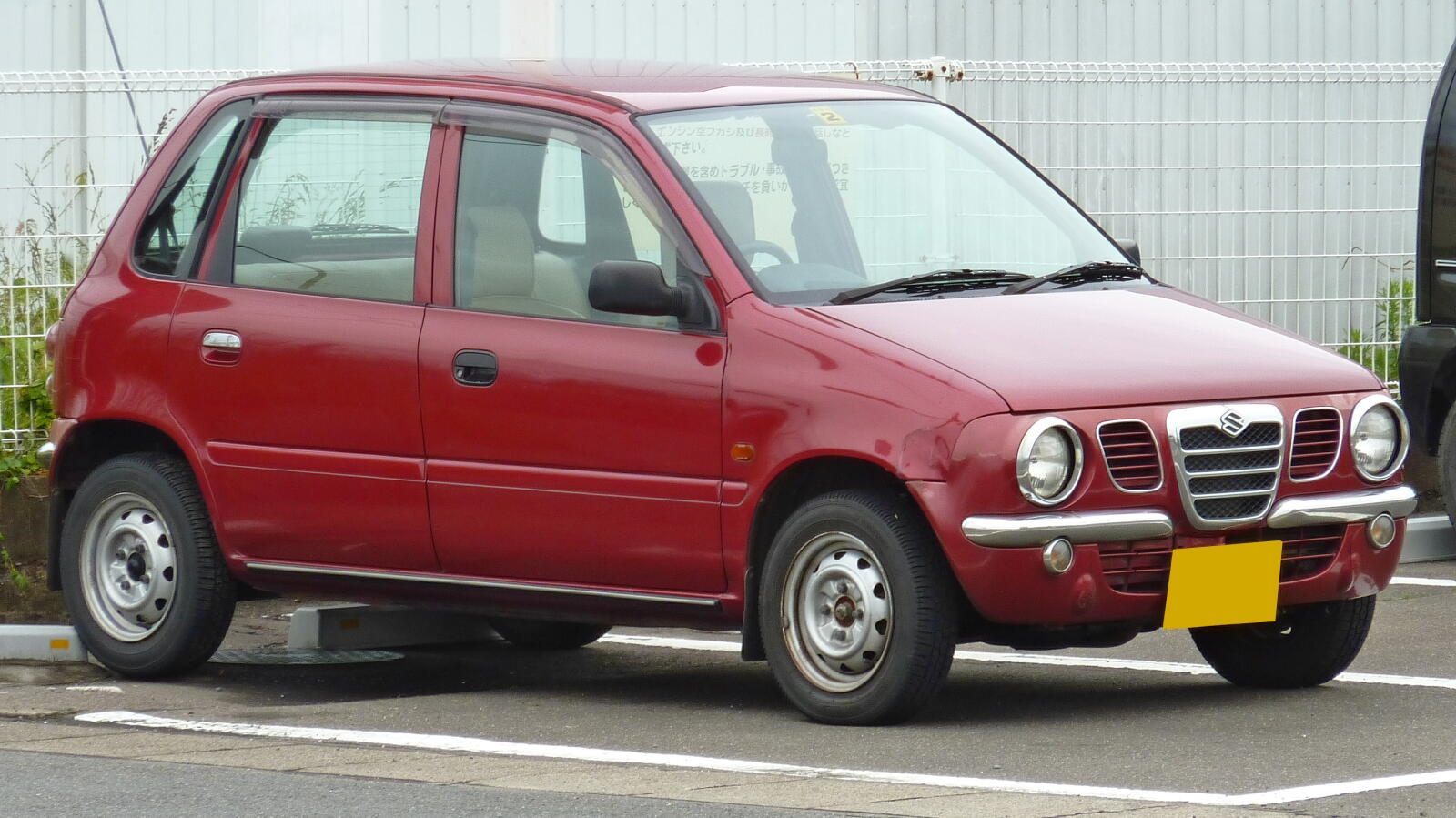
The retro Suzuki Cervo C

In August 1996 the retro-look Cervo C (for "Classic") appeared, following the success of Subaru's Vivio Bistro and Mitsuoka's original Viewt. The Cervo C came as a well-equipped five-door with the 52 PS (38 kW) F6A engine (55 PS in the automatic 4WD version). A high-powered AM/FM cassette stereo was standard, as were power windows and locks as well as wooden details on the dash and steering wheel. Automatic transmission and/or four-wheel drive were optional. The metal bodywork was the same as on the Cervo Mode, but the front assembly was entirely different and chromed bumpers, mirrors and doorhandles added to the classic look. In May 1997 a three-door version joined the lineup. Production ended in October 1998, when the Cervo Mode sister model was discontinued. A version was launched in India as the "Zen Classic." It was not well received, becoming a huge flop in the Indian market.

== Cervo HG21S (5th generation) ==
Fifth generation (HG11S)
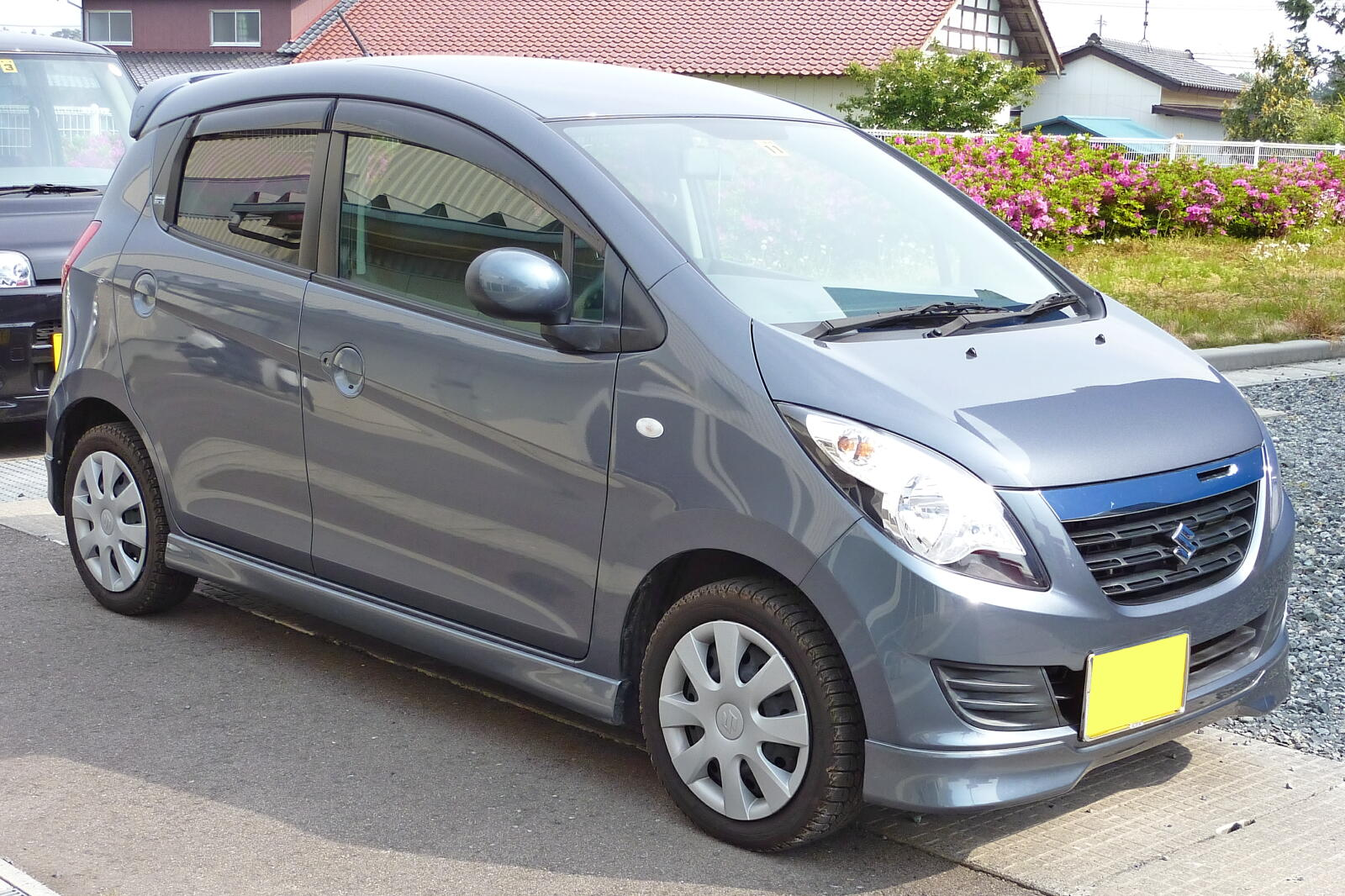

Overview
- Production: 2006–2009
- Assembly: Japan: Kosai, Shizuoka

Body and chassis
- Body style: 5-door hatchback
- Layout: Front-engine, front-wheel-drive or four-wheel-drive
- Related: Suzuki Alto

Powertrain
- Engine: 658 cc K6A I3; 658 cc K6A turbo I3
- Transmission: 4-speed automatic CVT

Dimensions
- Wheelbase: 2,360 mm (93 in)
- Length: 3,395 mm (133.7 in)
- Width: 1,475 mm (58.1 in)
- Height: 1,535–1,545 mm (60.4–60.8 in)
- Curb weight: 790–870 kg (1,742–1,918 lb)

In November 2006 Suzuki reintroduced the Cervo name. The modern, Alto-based Cervo is still a kei car but is more luxurious than its predecessor. It was introduced with the 658 cc K6A engine (54 hp in the normally aspirated VVT G version, 60 PS in the turbo T and TX version). It was only available as a five-door with a four-speed automatic (with a manual mode in the turbo cars), and was marketed as a more masculine alternative to the MR Wagon. The higher specification Cervos had keyless entry and Bluetooth. In June 2007 a G Limited normally aspirated model was added, with the fourteen-inch alloy wheels and rear spoiler of the TX.

In October 2007 the Cervo received the Japanese Good Design Award, and the SR version was introduced. This had a new, 64 hp direct injection turbo engine and a Jatco-made seven-step CVT transmission, the first time such a combination was available in a Japanese car. It had front-wheel drive and achieved 23.0 km/L (54 mpg) fuel consumption on the test cycle. The Cervo also received minor updates across the line, with liquid seal engine mounts and suspension changes. In May 2008 the range received more minor updates, with new colors being added and a new limited edition model, the G Limited II, which featured alcantara interior and a sporty exterior. Other models received new aero parts and other equipment, gas-discharge headlights were now available on the SR.

In May 2009 the T model was discontinued and the TX received the "aero" front dam of the SR. The fuel consumption of the naturally aspirated front-wheel-drive versions was improved to better the 2010 Japanese fuel consumption standards by 15 percent, thus qualifying for a tax break. The SR is the only turbocharged Kei car to qualify for the lower tax grades for especially environmentally friendly vehicles, combining this with being the most powerful version.

Sales targets were 60,000 per year when introduced; this goal had shrunk to 12,000 for 2009. The Cervo was discontinued by Suzuki during December 2009.

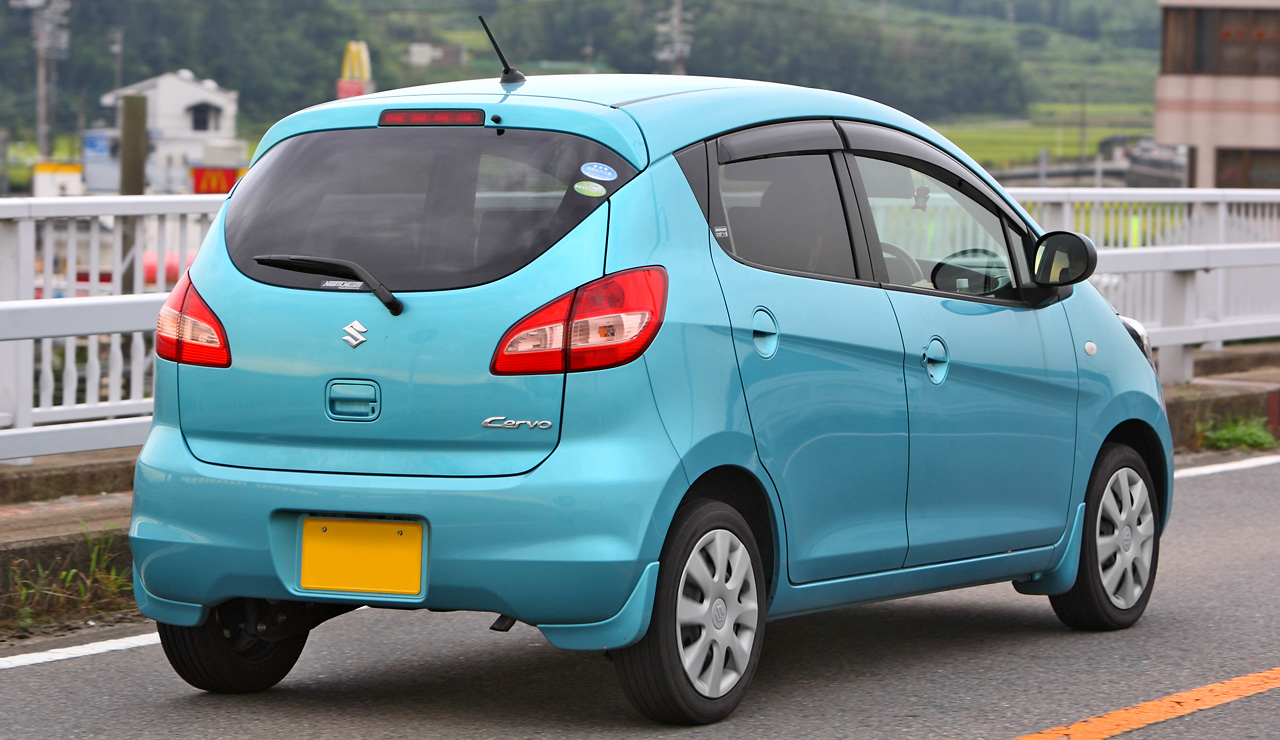
Rear view

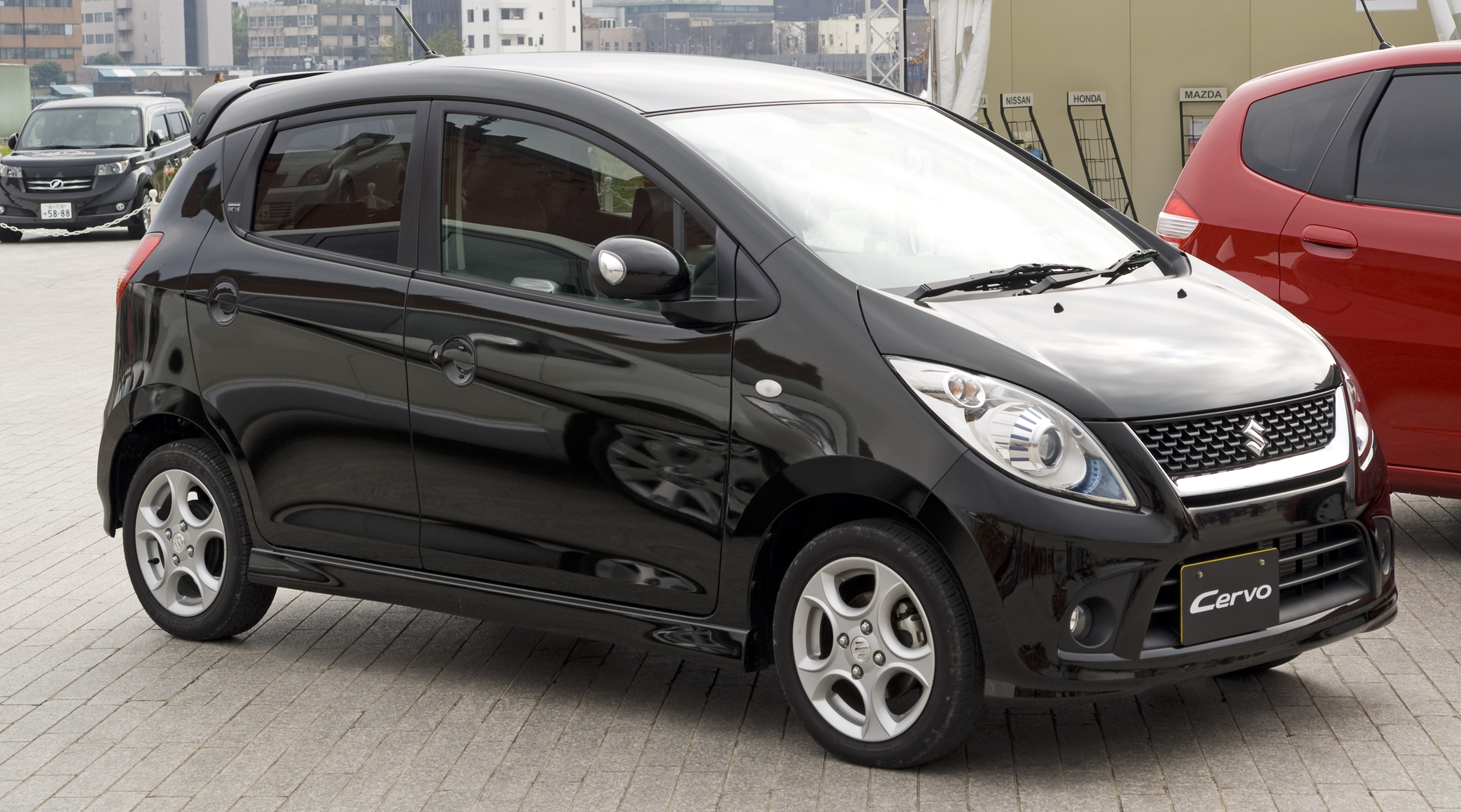
Suzuki Cervo SR

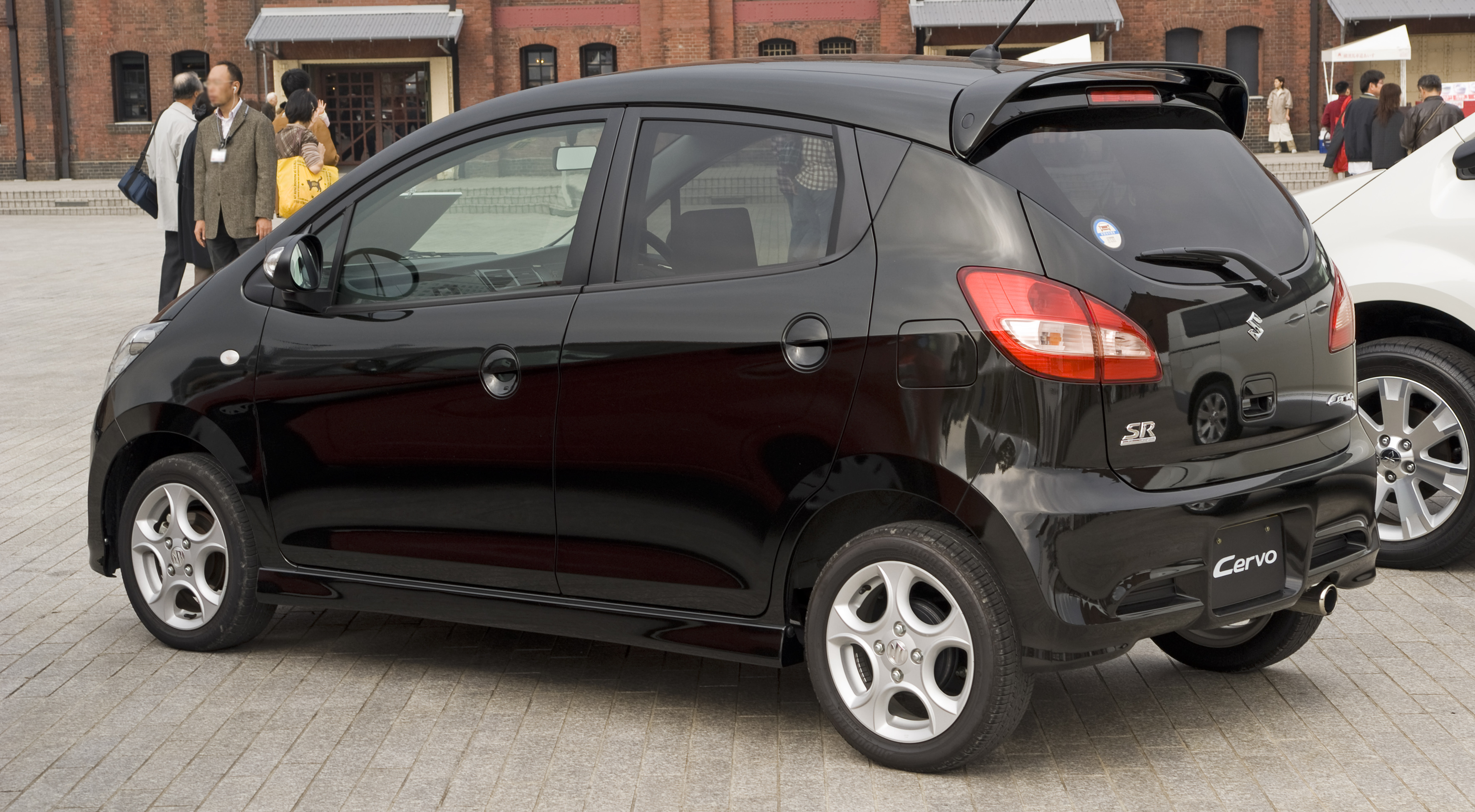
Suzuki Cervo SR

Cervo TX

Cervo TX rear
