= Gee Whiz =

Gee Whiz or variations may refer to:

- "Gee Whiz (Look at His Eyes)", a song performed by Carla Thomas (1960) and Bernadette Peters (1980)
- "Gee Whiz", an episode of Aqua Teen Hunger Force (season 3) TV series
- Gee Whiz-z-z-z-z-z-z, a 1956 Warner Bros. cartoon in the Looney Tunes series
- Gee-whiz graph, a misleading graph in statistics
- REVAi, known as REVA G-Wiz in the UK, an electric car
- Gary G-Wiz, Gary Rinaldo (born 1969), American record producer
- George W. Dick (born 1964), known as G-Wiz, American musician
- G-Wizz, an ITV Granada online platform

== See also ==
- GW-BASIC, is a dialect of the BASIC programming language
