= Wiz (video game) =

1985 video game

- North American arcade flyer
- Developer: Seibu Kaihatsu
- Publishers: JP: Taito; NA: Magic Electronics
- Platforms: Arcade, MSX
- Release: JP: January 1985; NA: October 1985
- Genre: Run and gun
- Modes: Single-player, multiplayer

Wiz (Note: Japanese: ウィズ, Hepburn: Wizu), also released as The Wiz, is a 1985 run and gun video game developed by Seibu Kaihatsu and published by Taito for arcades. It was released in Japan in January 1985 and North America in October 1985 by Magic Electronics. Sony released a port for the MSX only in Japan in 1986 as Magical Kid Wiz. Hamster Corporation released the game as part of their Arcade Archives series for the Nintendo Switch and PlayStation 4 in June 2020, as well as the Arcade Archives 2 series for the Nintendo Switch 2, PlayStation 5, Xbox Series X/S and Windows in September 2026.

== Gameplay ==
The player controls the titular wizard, who must traverse treacherous terrain in the Depths, the Land Realm and the Sky Realm in order to defeat a dragon at the Sky Realm. He can switch between 8 different types of magic, including basic magical projectiles, an enhanced projectile, a melee attack, bombs, fire, freezing time, a protective barrier and a monster who helps with defeating enemies. All magic except for the former are limited use and require power-ups to be used. The wizard can jump over holes and enemies to navigate all while defeating enemies with his magic, in order to reach the end of each level.
